= Susanna and the Elders in art =

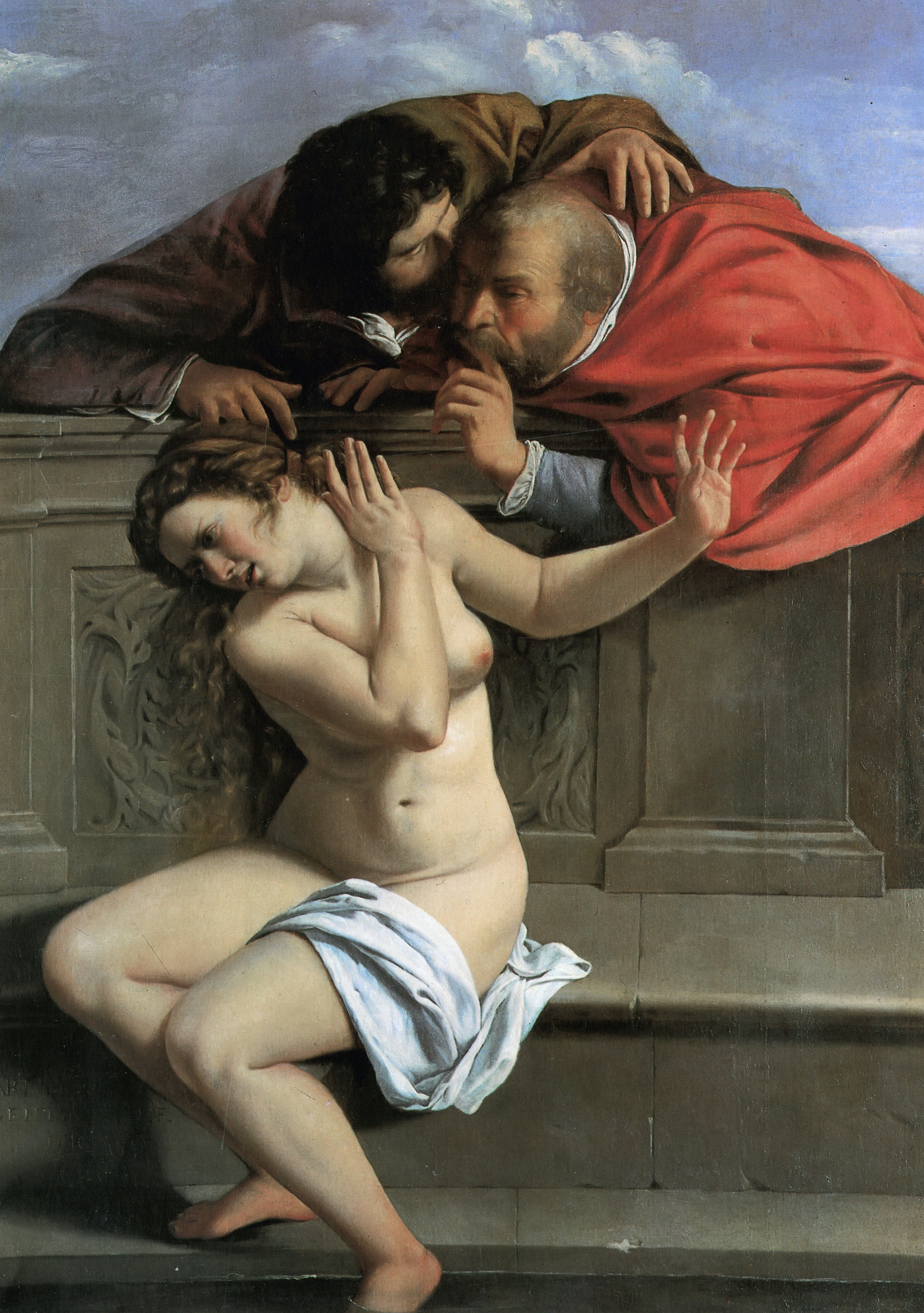
Susanna and the Elders (1610) by Artemisia Gentileschi

Susanna and the Elders is an Old Testament story of a woman falsely accused of adultery after she refuses two men who, after discovering one another in the act of spying on her while she bathes, conspire to blackmail her for sex. Depictions of the story date back to the late 3rd/early 4th centuries and are still being created.

The story has been portrayed by many artists, particularly in the early Christian and late Renaissance and Baroque periods. The bathing Susanna was first shown fully clothed and served as a symbol of faith and marital chastity; in the 15th century more images depicted her nude in her bath and became increasingly lascivious. Modern scholars explain this by pointing out the appeal to male artists and patrons of a portrayal of a naked woman watched by sexually aroused fully-clothed men. The portrayals by Artemisia Gentileschi were among the earliest to depart from the traditional portrayals of Susanna as not being distressed during the encounter.

== Story ==
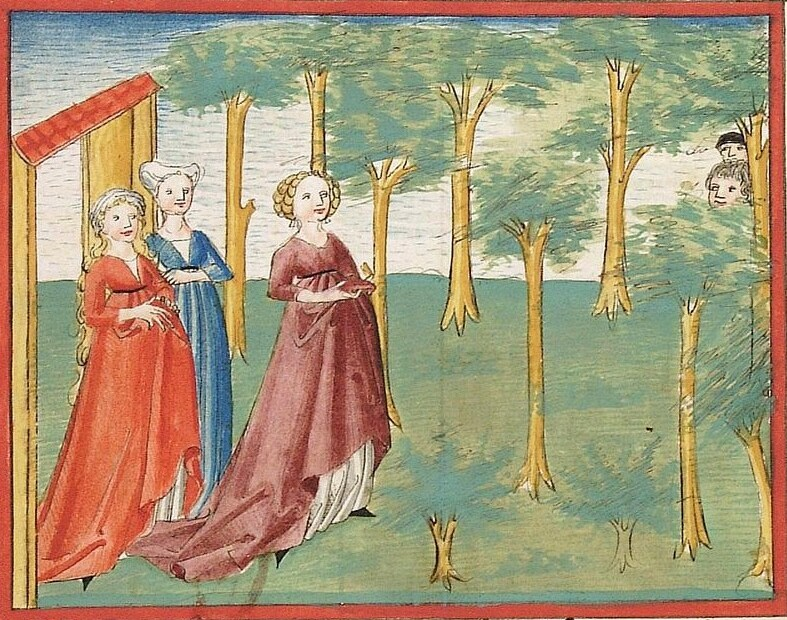
German Bible illustration, 1477

In the thirteenth chapter of the Book of Daniel (or the Book of Susanna in the Old Testament Apocrypha), Susanna, a young and beautiful married woman, is lusted after by two well-respected men. One day they catch one another spying on her as she bathes. Together they hatch a plot to blackmail her into having sex with them by telling her they will testify they caught her committing adultery, which is punishable by death, if she does not comply. She refuses, and they accuse her in front of the community, testifying that they saw her having sex with a young man under a tree in her husband's garden. Susanna is condemned to be executed and casts her eyes to heaven in a prayer for help. Appearing suddenly, the young Daniel objects to the verdict and insists on cross-examining the two men separately, asking them under what kind of tree the adulterers were having sex. The first man says a mastic, the second an oak, and the two men are caught in their lies and put to death themselves.

== Early Christian and medieval depictions ==
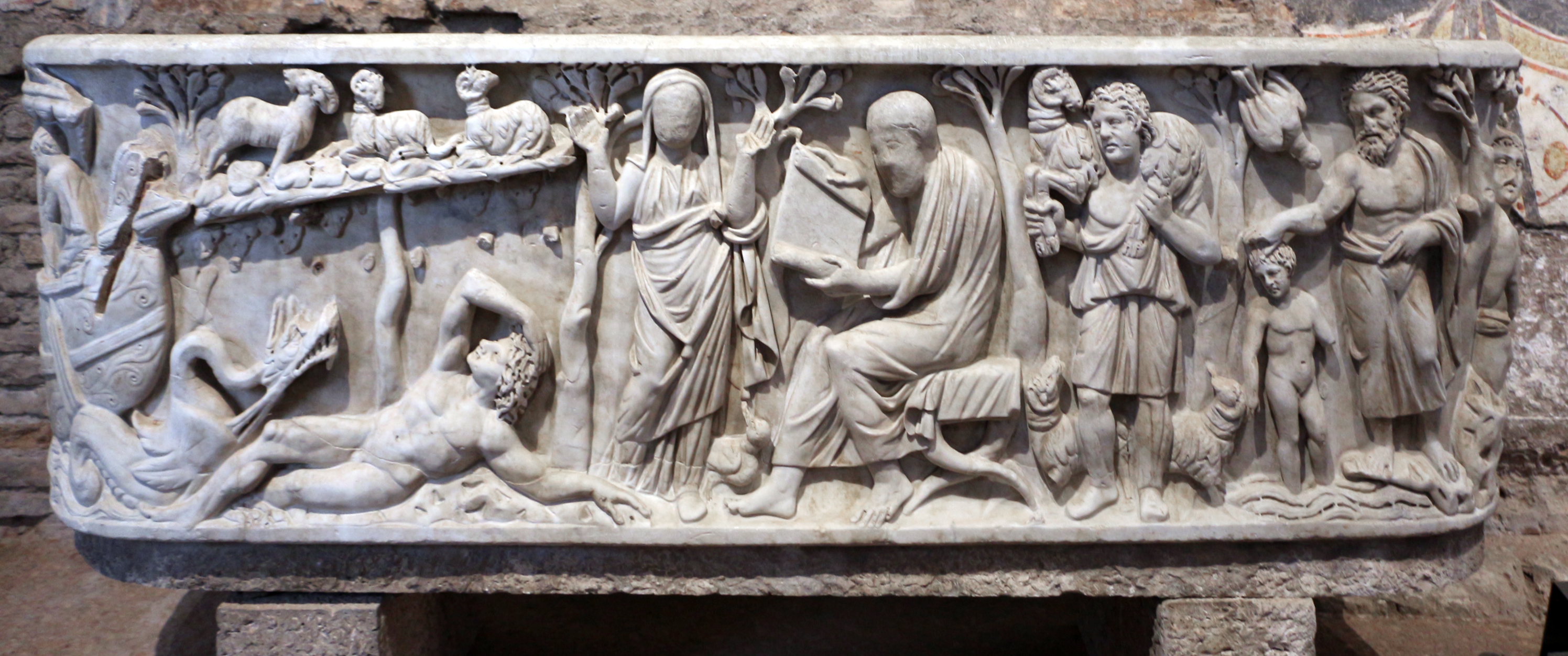
Marble sarcophagus with scenes from the Old and New Testaments, late 3rd century, Santa Maria Antiqua, Rome. The woman at center is flanked by two trees and is a conflation of Susanna and the deceased woman buried in the sarcophagus.

Susanna is among the earliest identifiable biblical women to appear in Christian art. She is one of a group of individuals from the Old Testament – along with Noah, Abraham and Isaac, Moses, Daniel and the Three Hebrew Children, and Jonah – invoked in the Christian commendatio animae (commendation of souls), a third-century prayer said over the dying, which is still incorporated in the Roman Catholic liturgy. These same figures appear on catacomb walls and marble sarcophagi from the late third century onward, with their hands lifted in prayer (orant) because they are in peril so great that only the intervention of God can save them. To early Christians, images of Susanna and the others represented the personal salvation available through God’s grace and Jesus’ sacrifice.

Among the earliest images of Susanna and the Elders are those in the catacombs of Priscilla in Rome, one of the oldest and largest catacomb systems in Rome, possibly used for Christian burials as early as 200. The paintings, from the late third/early fourth century, are in an underground room that has come to be known as the cappella greca (Greek Chapel), after two Greek memorial inscriptions found there. Three scenes from Susanna’s story are the largest and most prominent in the room and include her accusation by the Elders. An unusual allegorical example of the image of Susanna and the Elders from the same period is found in the Roman catacomb of Praetextatus: a sheep labeled “SUSANNA” stands between two wolves, one of whom is captioned “SENIORIS” (elder). This representation may also be an allusion to attacks by heretics on orthodox believers (faithful sheep). Even more significant, this is an early example of an image in which a woman can be read as a symbol of Jesus, in this case the Agnus Dei, Lamb of God. Early theologians as prominent as Augustine, Ambrose, and Jerome associated Susanna with Jesus in their writings.

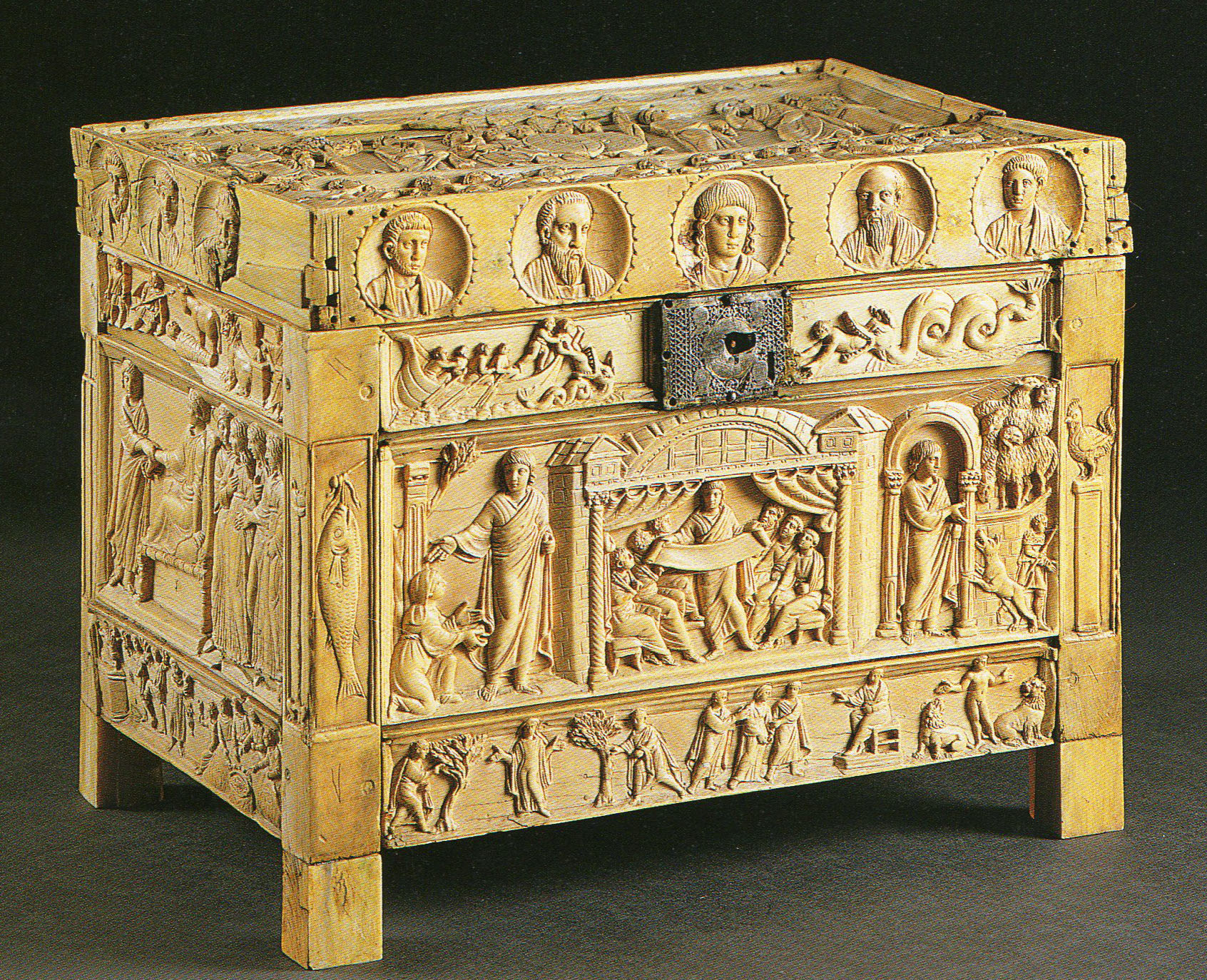
The Brescia Casket, an ivory reliquary box, northern Italy, late 4th century. On the lowest plaque, at left, Susanna is flanked by two trees and the Elders, and, in the center, the Elders bring her to judgment before the enthroned Daniel.

Many other images on catacomb walls or marble sarcophagi depict Susanna standing between the two Elders or between the two trees that represent their duplicity. A woman between two trees might also be a conflation of Susanna and a deceased Christian woman in the garden of Paradise: Susanna was praised by the early Church as an embodiment of modesty, innocence, and marital virtue, and she could have appropriately decorated the tomb of any Christian woman of good character.

Besides many early images on catacomb walls and sarcophagi, Susanna’s story was depicted on objects of glass and ivory, like the Brescia Casket, an important ivory reliquary box from fourth-century Italy.

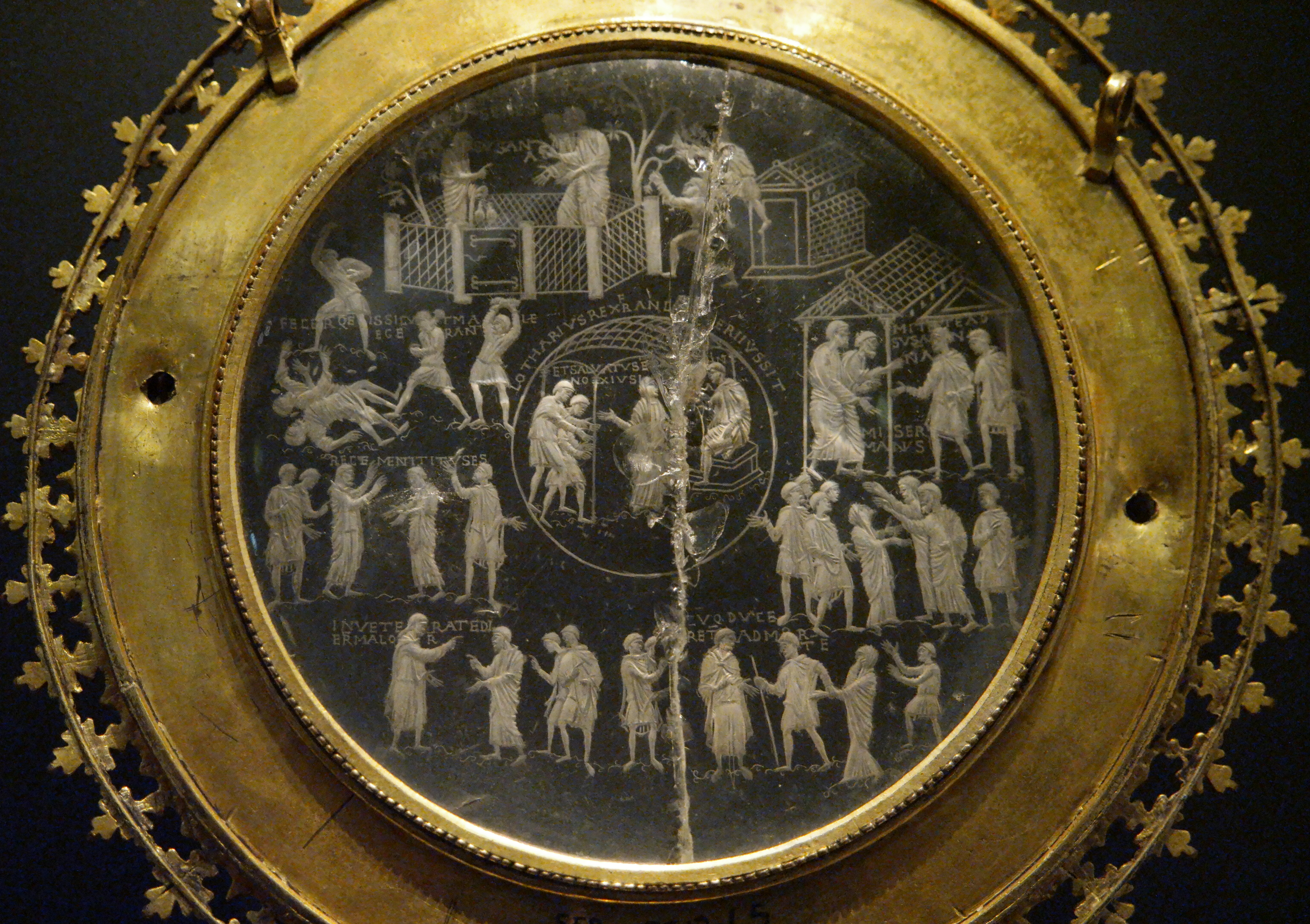
The Susanna, or Lothair, Crystal, c. 860, diameter 4-1/2 inches, depicting eight scenes from Susanna's story.

The Susanna Crystal, also known as the Lothair Crystal, is a mid–9th-century engraved rock crystal in a gilded copper frame made in the Lotharingia region of northwest Europe. Despite its small size (4½ inches in diameter), it is carved with eight vignettes of the story of Susanna, with inscriptions from the Latin Vulgate Bible accompanying each scene. The figures are in the School of Reims style found in works commissioned by Bishop Ebbo of that city, such as the famous Utrecht Psalter. An inscription on the back of the crystal names Lothair II, King of Lotharingia, as the commissioner. The crystal was possibly a gift from Lothair around 865 to placate his queen, Theutberga, who had suffered through a Susanna-like ordeal: in an attempt to put her aside for his mistress, Lothair had two archbishops falsely accuse her of incest, but she was exonerated at the demand of Pope Nicholas I. Thereafter, royal women invoked her when they were being mistreated.

== History of later portrayals ==
Aside from a very few exceptions, Susanna is always shown fully clothed in the bathing scene in early Christian and medieval art. In the fifteenth century, however, although some artists continued to depict her in modest attire, an increasing number of images portray her with her dress pulled above her knees or completely naked. Beginning about 1470, the nude Susanna is the subject of paintings by many artists, including artists who depicted the scene multiple times. The story has been portrayed especially often from the 1500s, when nudes came back into fashion. In practice it allowed artists the opportunity to display their skill in the depiction of the female nude, often for the pleasure of their male patrons.

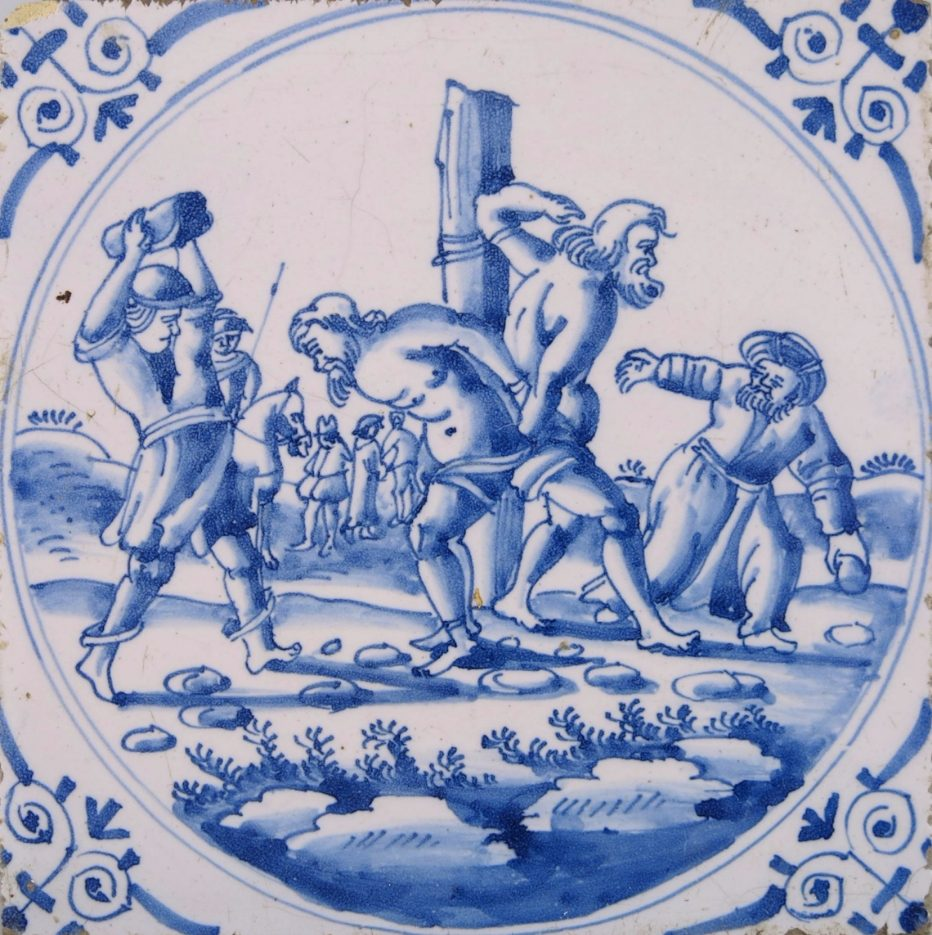
Stoning of the Elders on an 18th-century Delftware tile

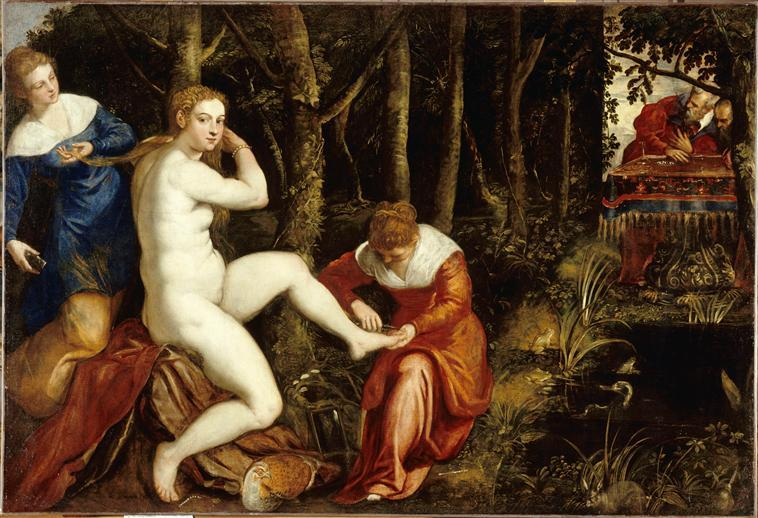
Tintoretto's Susanna and the Elders; Susanna is looking directly at the viewer of the painting, showing she is aware of being watched.

According to Mary Garrard, the scene has been unusually attractive to male artists and male art patrons as "an opportunity for legitimized voyeurism", an appeal heightened by the fact the naked woman in the story was being watched by lechers, allowing both the artist and the viewer of the painting a point of view character in the scene. Garrard points out that it is significant that portrayals of The Judgement of Daniel and The Stoning of the Elders, the other two major vignettes from this story, are comparatively rare in art. Instead of focusing on truth discovered or justice meted out, nearly all portrayals focus on the naked or partially-naked woman being watched or importuned by sexually aroused fully-clothed men.

Garard argues that the possession of a woman who has clearly said "no" is in fact rape, and that the depictions of Susanna and the Elders as being from the point of view of the elders are depictions from the point of view of attempted rapists. Susanna's dilemma is most often painted as not her desire to avoid being victimized but instead whether or not to give in to her presumed natural desire to have sex with two elderly blackmailers.

=== Depictions ===
Portrayals in paintings through the end of the 18th century, with few departures, tend to portray Susanna as making little protest and sometimes seeming to appear acquiescent.

During the Renaissance period there was an increased interest in and production of nudes, which had fallen out of interest during the Middle Ages. Production of paintings featuring naked women increased. Typical representations show Susanna protesting being watched mildly or not at all. Portrayals of the scene during this period typically emphasized the elders' point of view—the voyeurism they enjoyed, their anticipation of sex—and did not address Susanna's distress except to occasionally picture her with her eyes cast to heaven in a plea for help. Norma Broude called these and the similar depictions in Renaissance art blatant distortions of the biblical Susanna.

=== Goitrous neck motif ===
A 2026 review by Joselv Albano and Janelle Lara Mirhan argued that a number of depictions from the Renaissance, Mannerist, and Baroque periods of Susanna and the Elders present Susanna with an enlarged or "goitrous" neck (see goitre). In their review of 27 paintings, the authors suggested that this feature may reflect a combination of endemic iodine deficiency in some artists' regions, the spread of stylistic conventions across schools in Europe, and period ideals linking a rounded neck with feminine beauty and virtue. They further argued that the motif may have helped artists visually reinforce Susanna's beauty and righteousness.

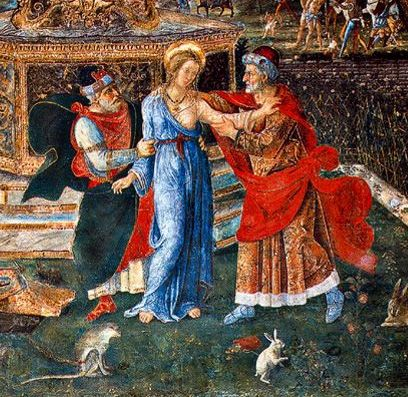
1492–1494 Pinturicchio

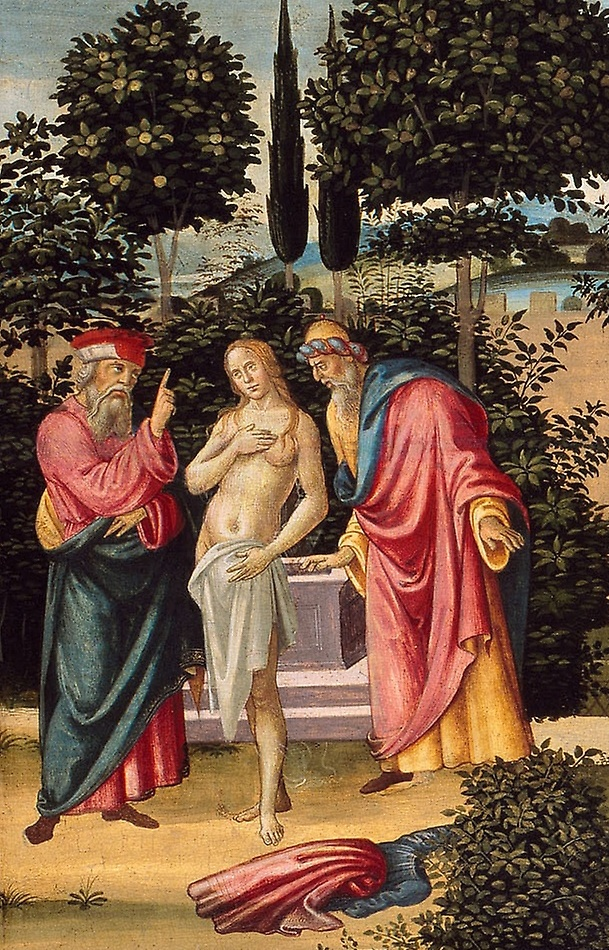
c.1500 Master of Apollo and Daphne

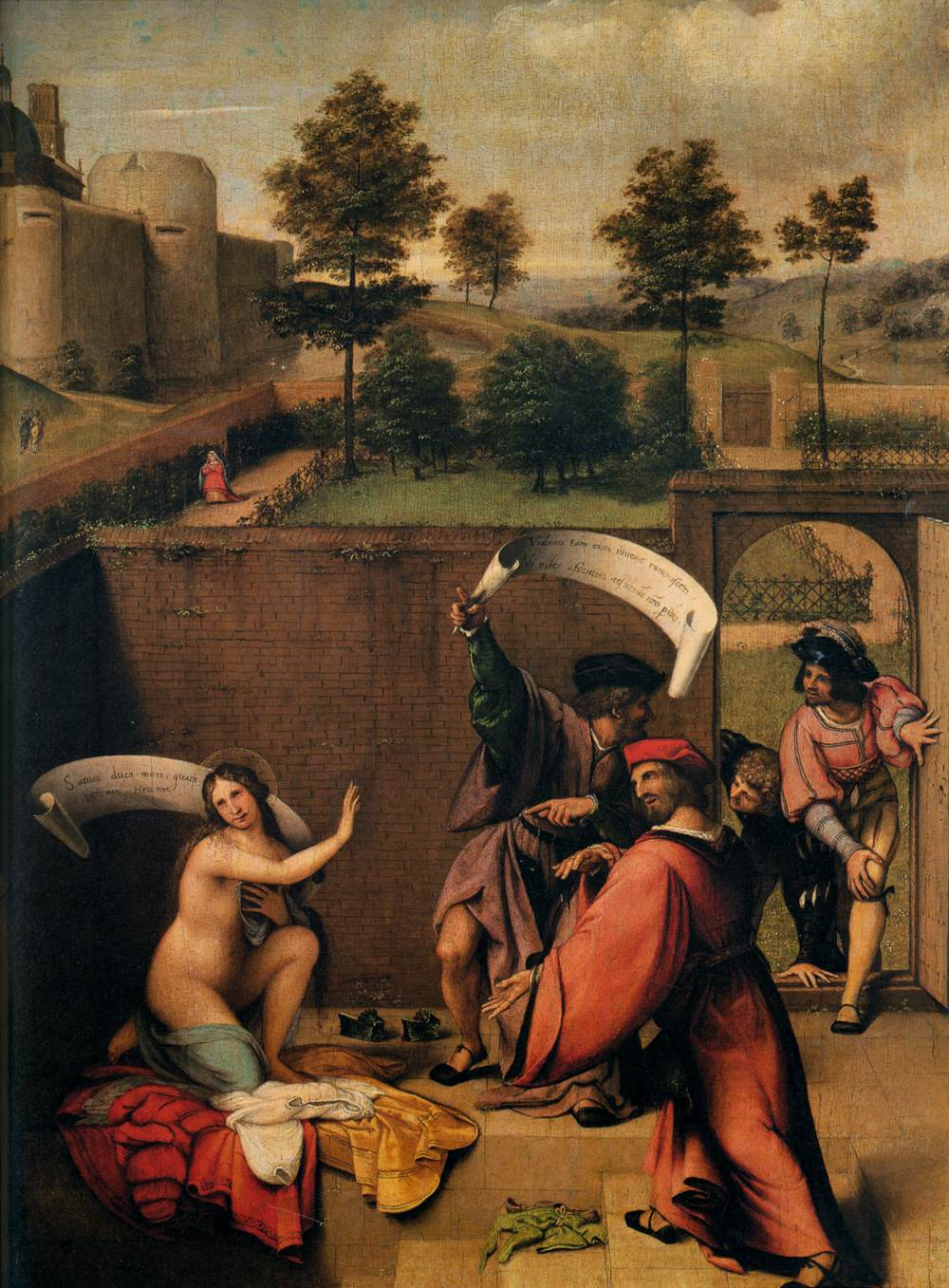
1517 Lorenzo Lotto

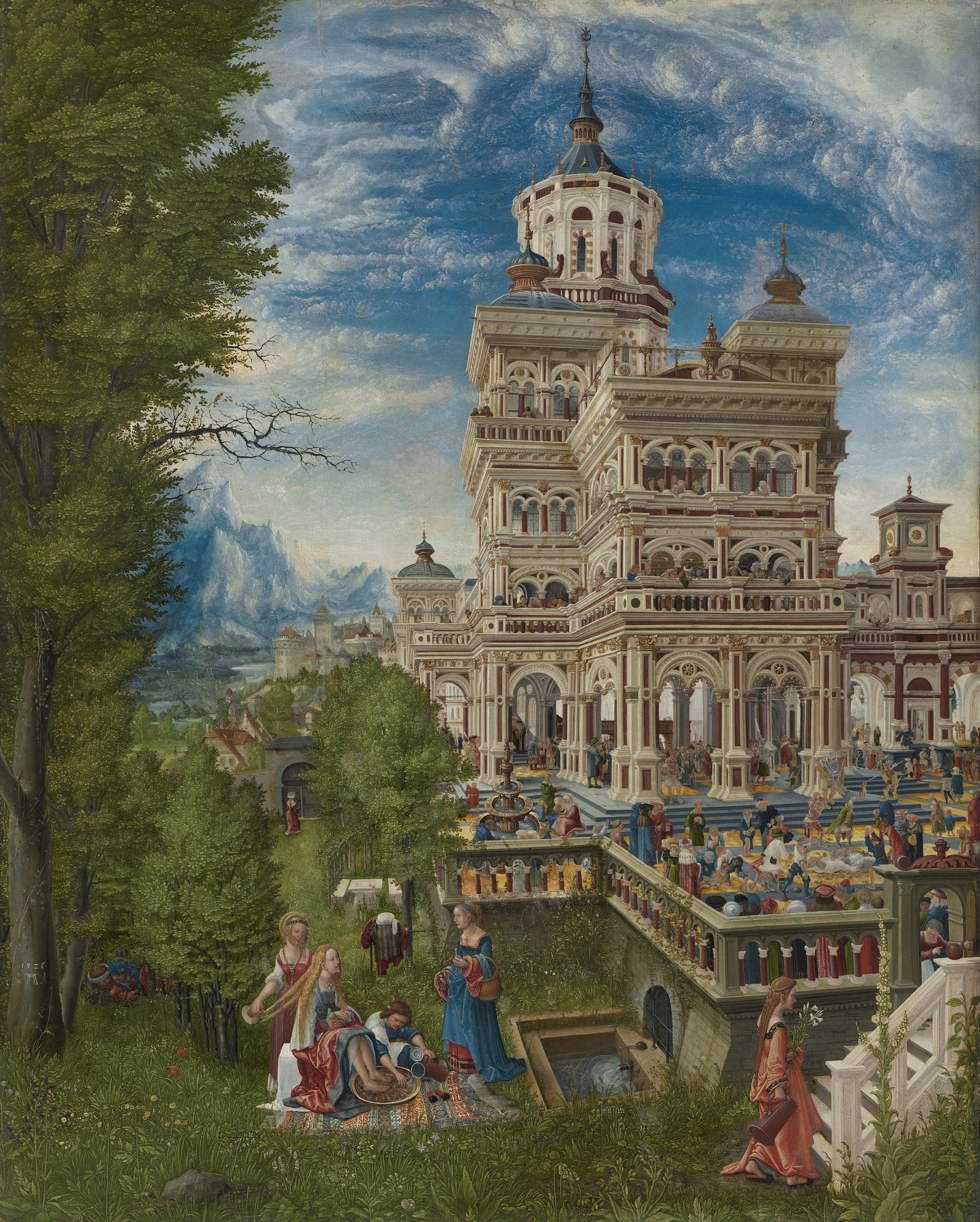
1526 Albrecht Altdorfer

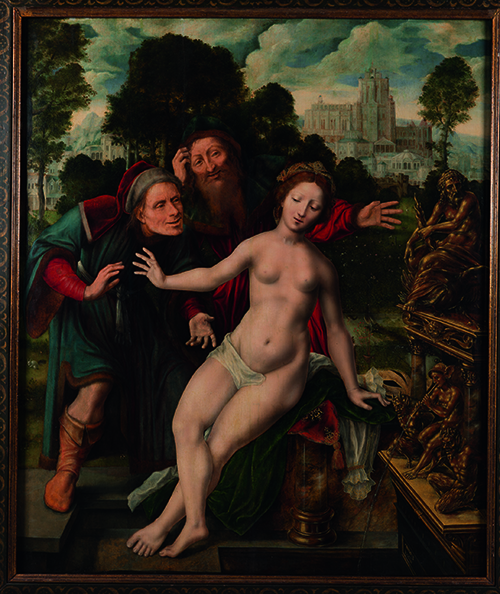
c.1540–1560 Jan Matsys

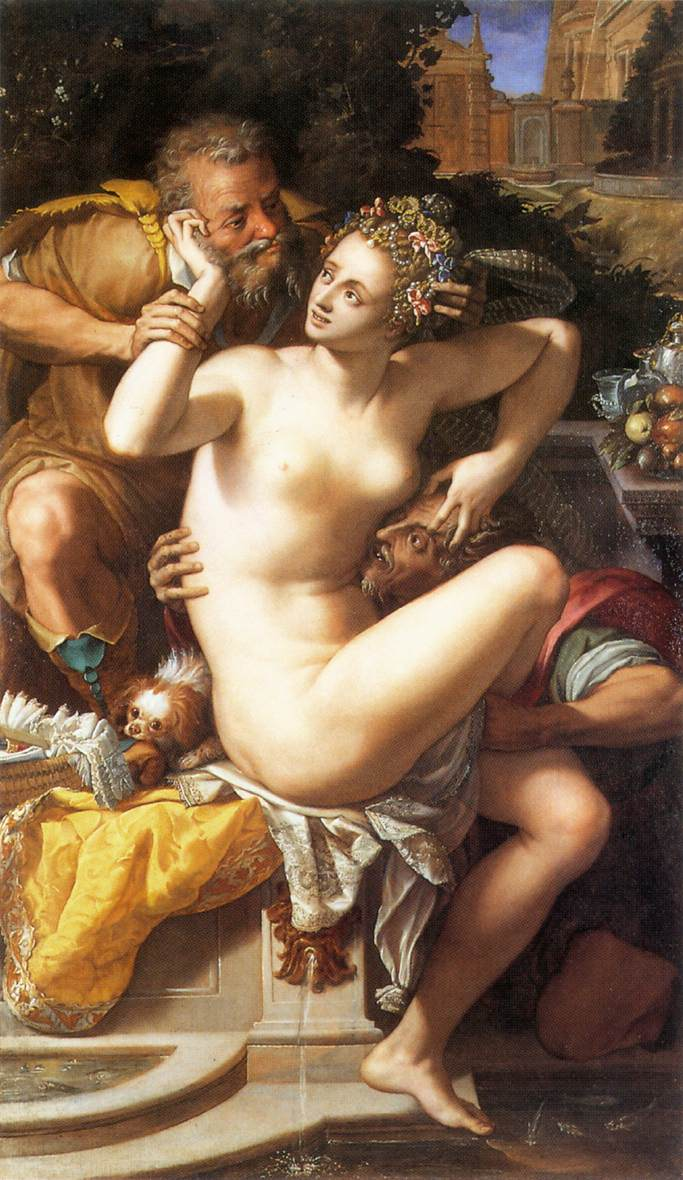
1561 Alessandro Allori

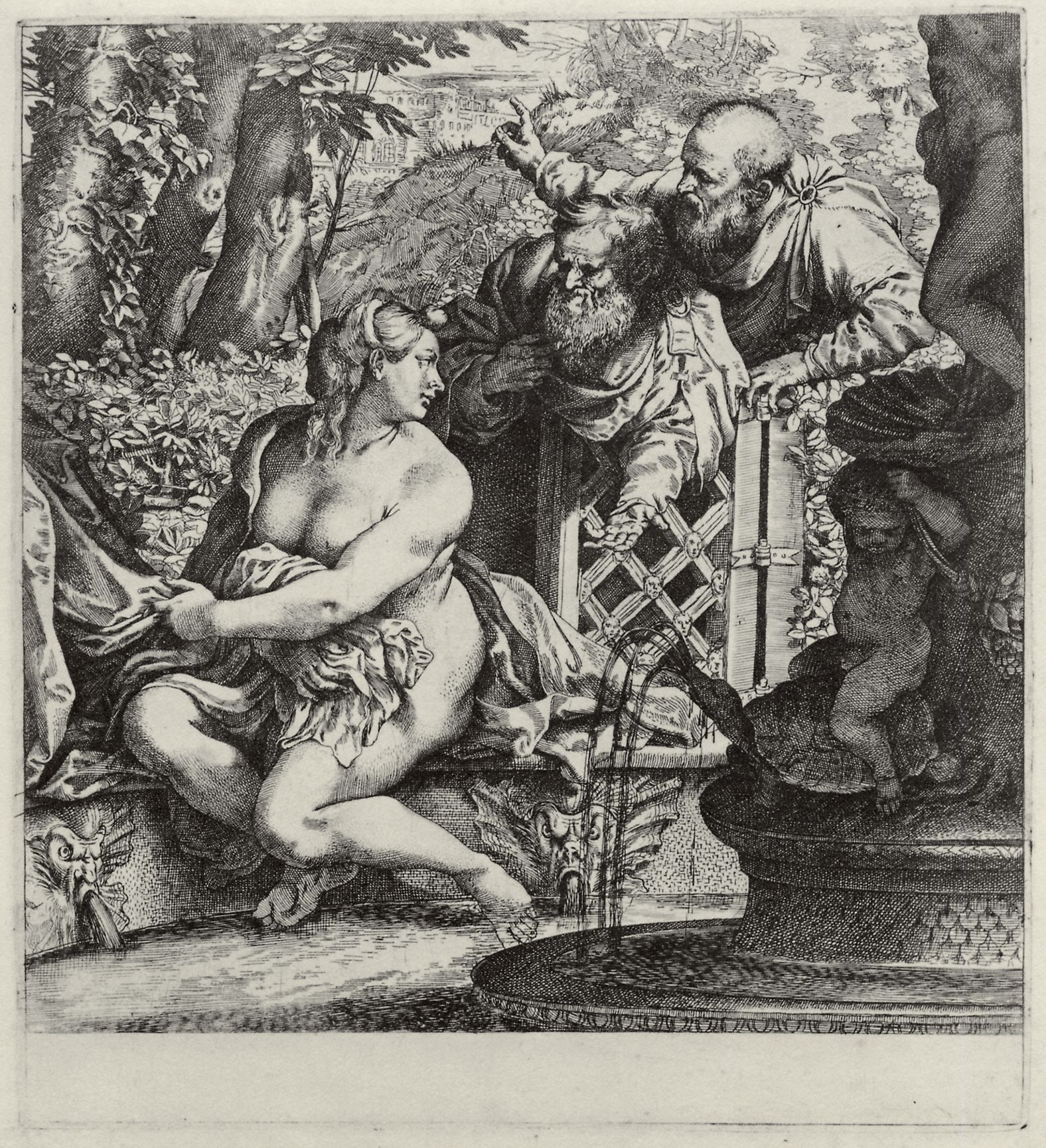
1590 Annibale Carracci

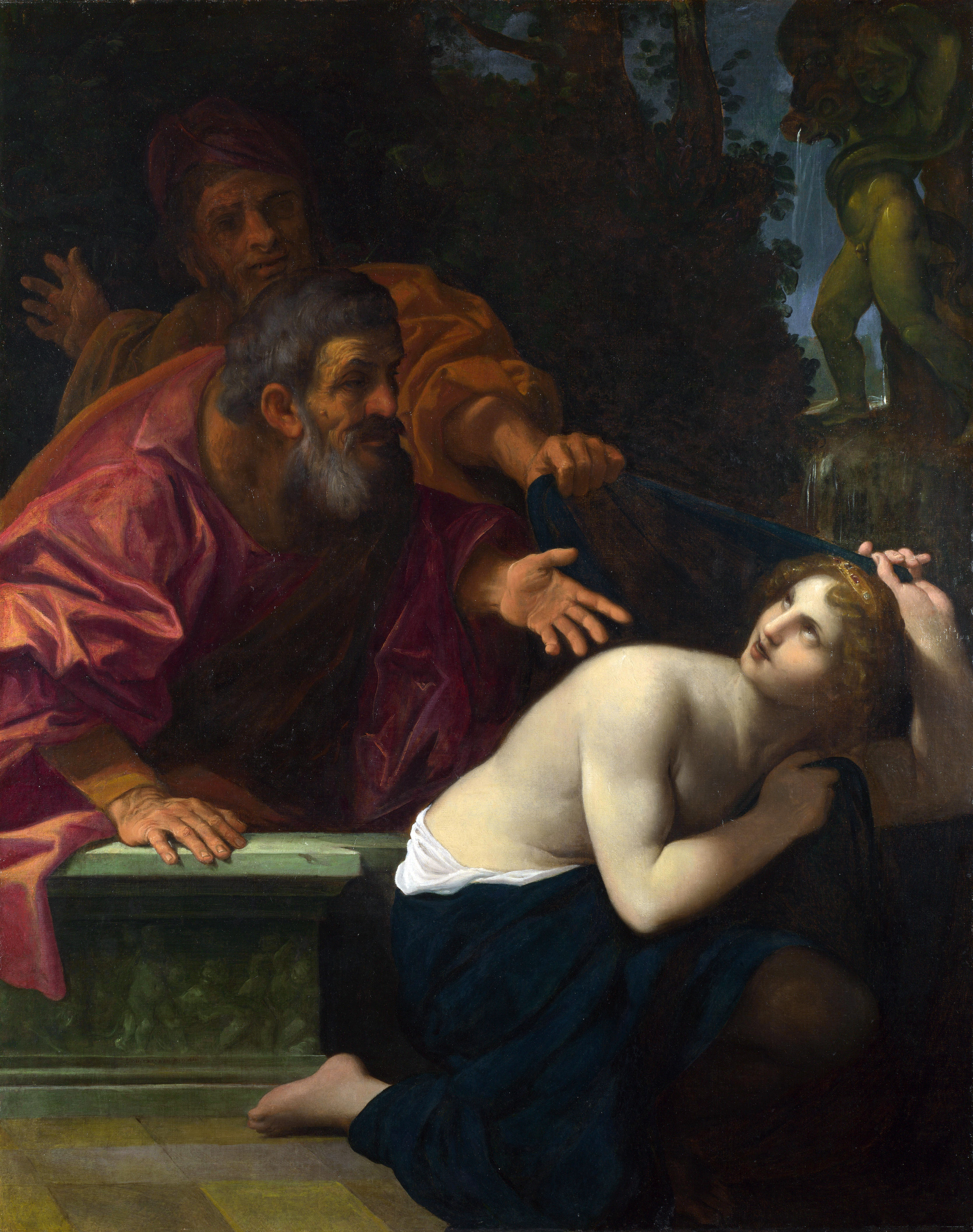
1598 Ludovico Carracci

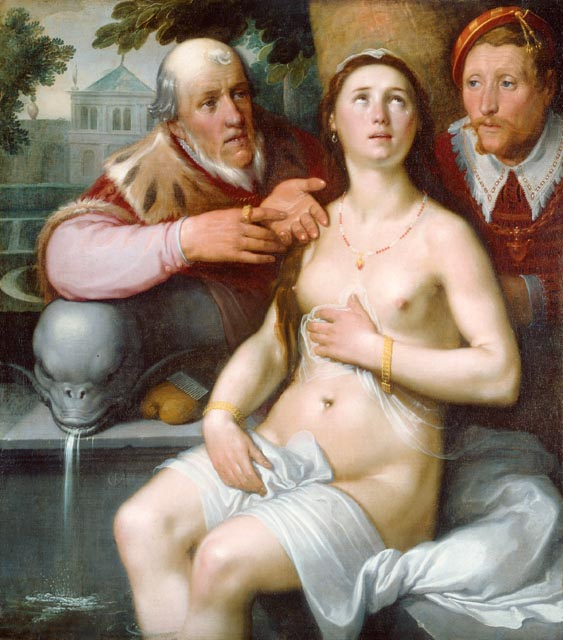
1599 Cornelis van Haarlem

Treatments in the Baroque period were more likely to emphasize the point of view of Susanna, who is uncomfortable with or objects to being watched, while others continued to concentrate on the male gaze. In 17th-century portrayals, combining Susanna's rejection of the men's advances while gazing toward heaven became common, although in the biblical passage, she does not cast her eyes to heaven until after they have publicly accused her of adultery.

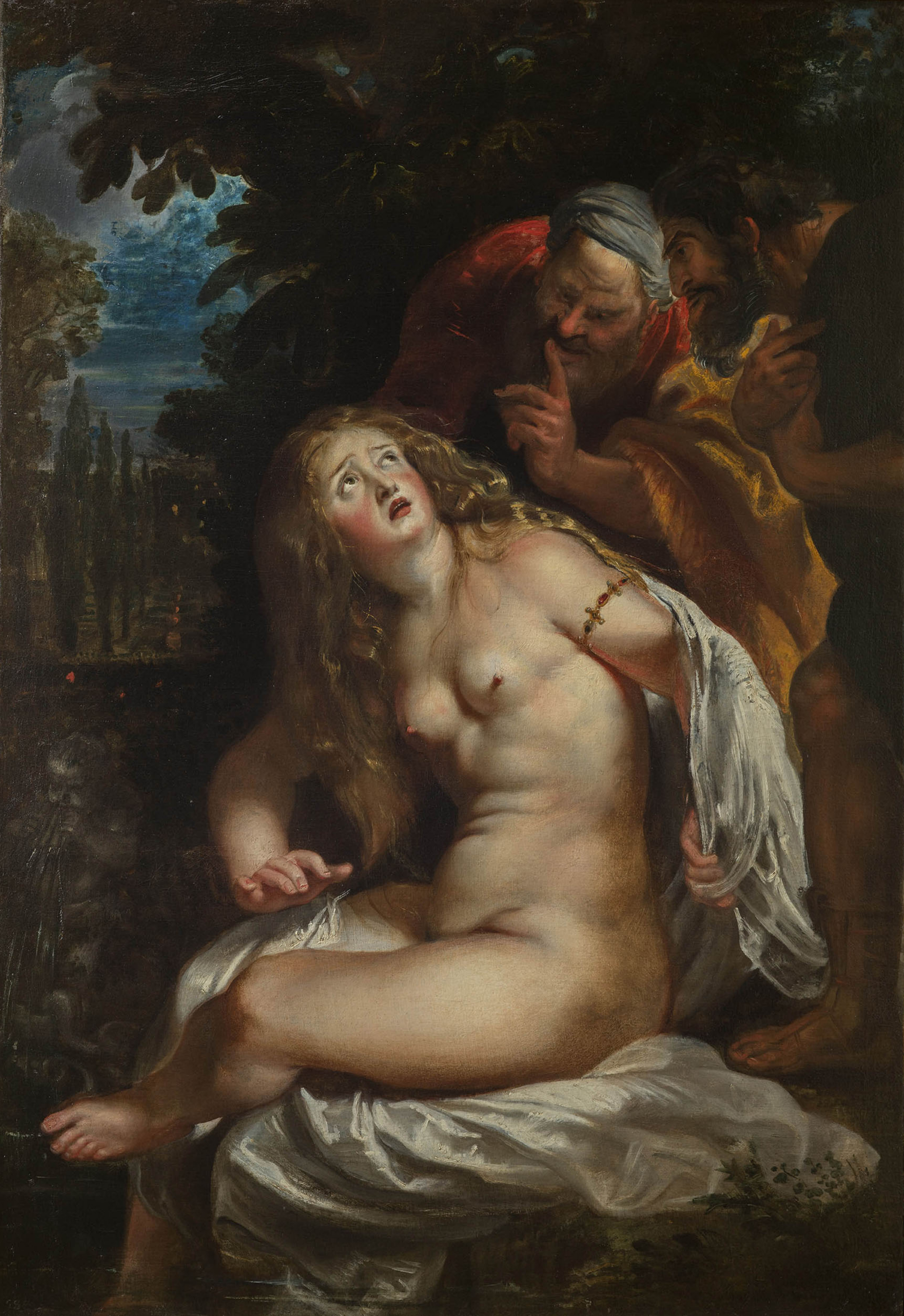
1607 Rubens

1621/1622 Anthony van Dyck

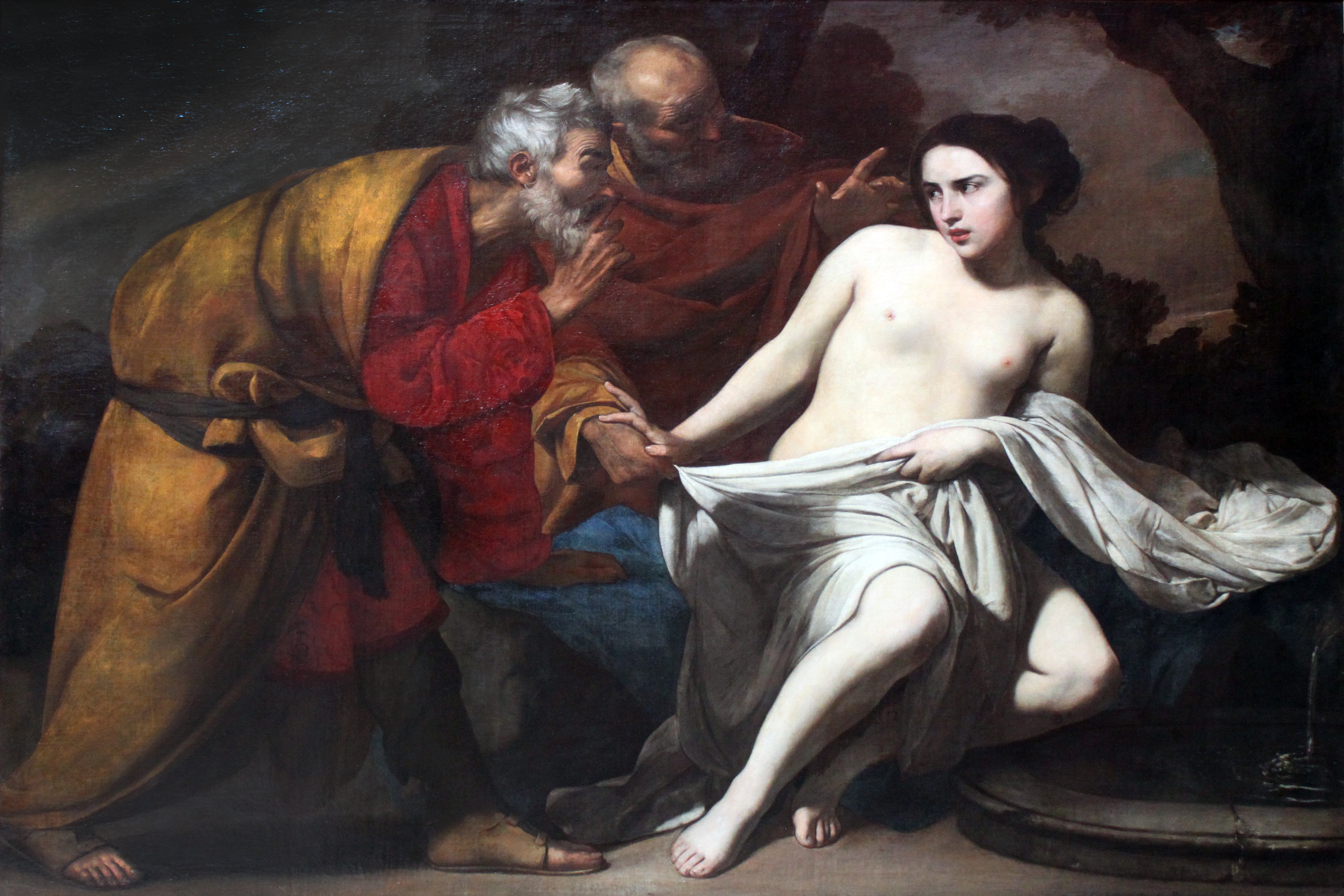
1643 Massimo Stanzione

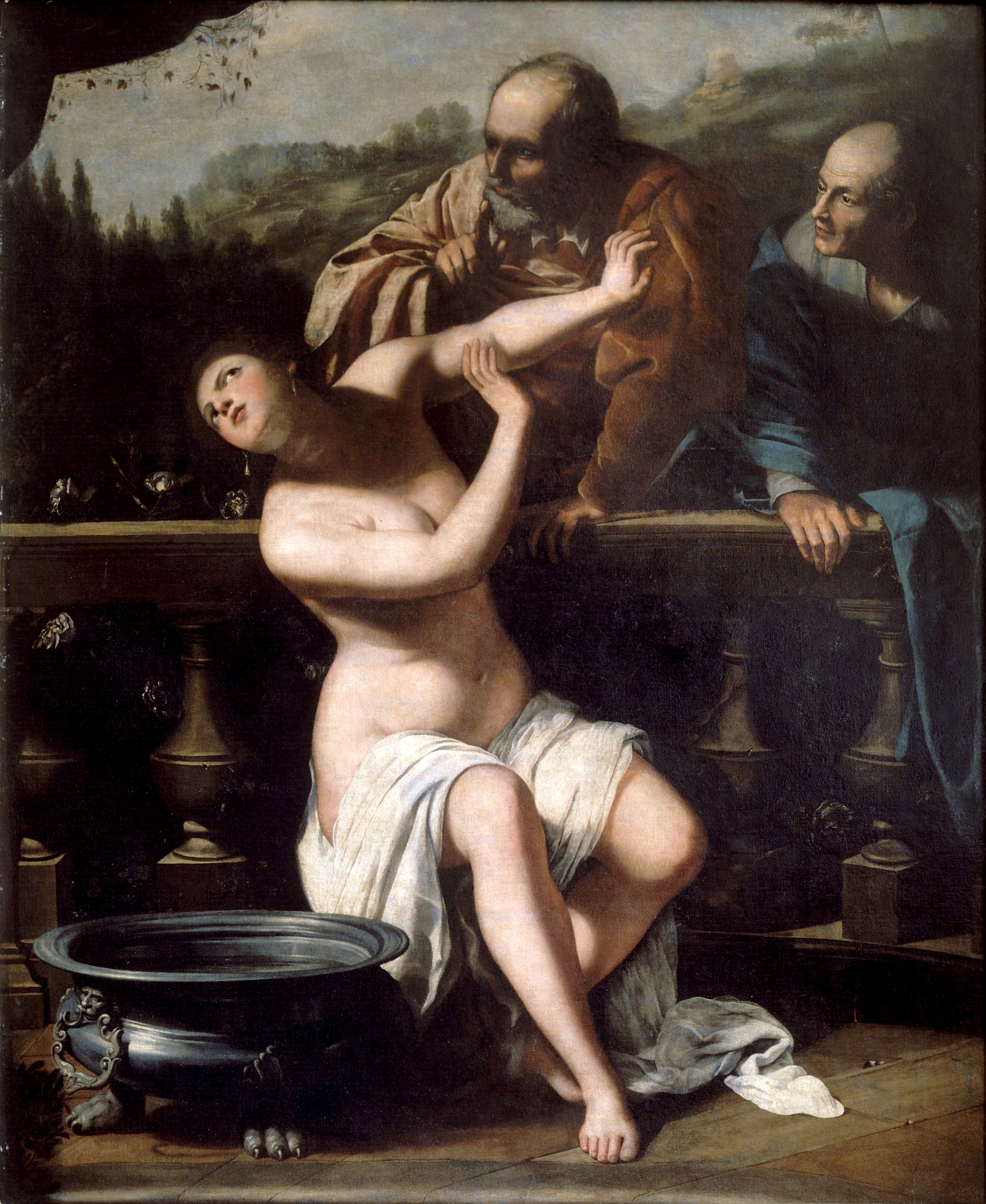
1649 Artemisia Gentileschi

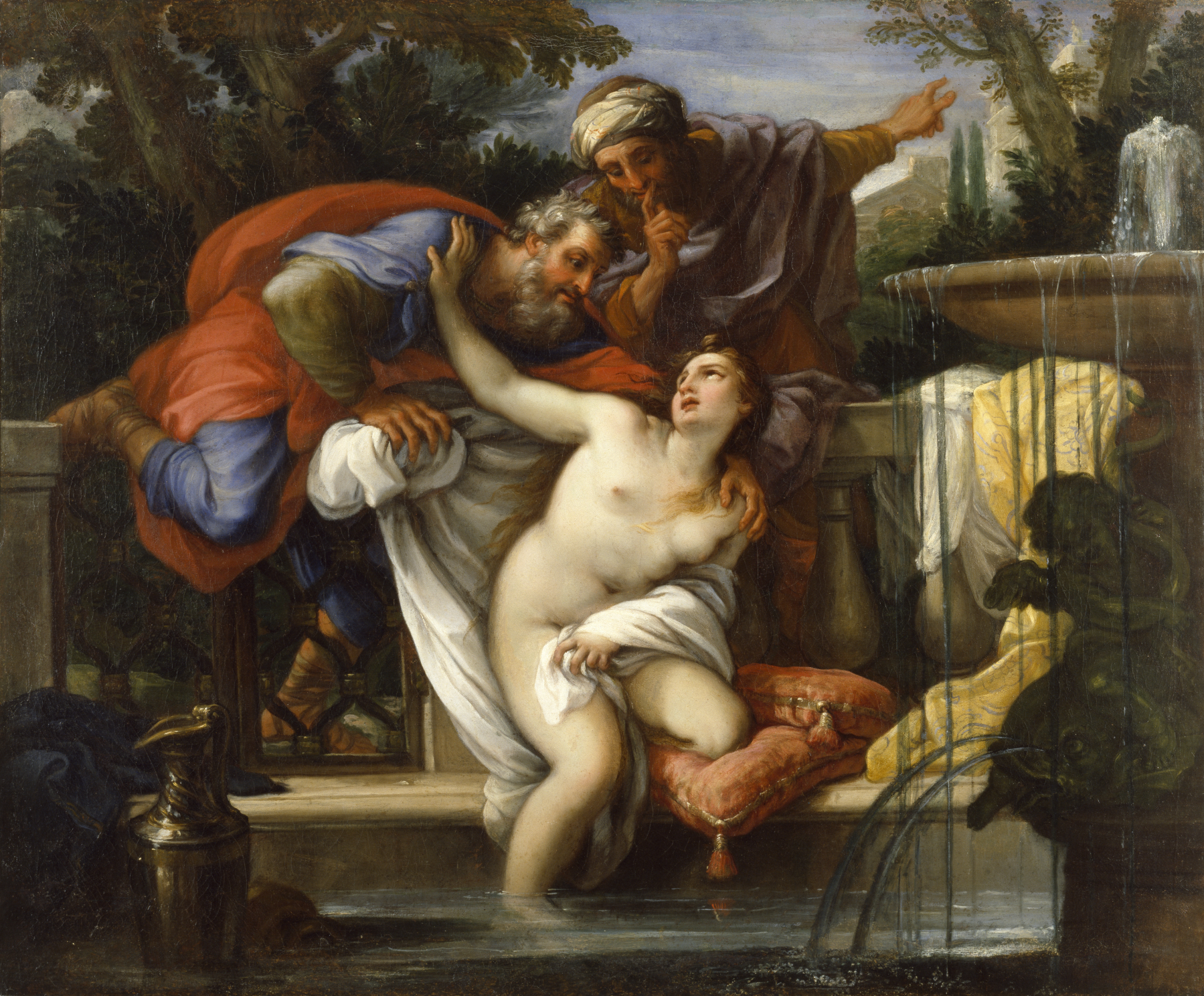
c.1700–1727 Giuseppe Bartolomeo Chiari

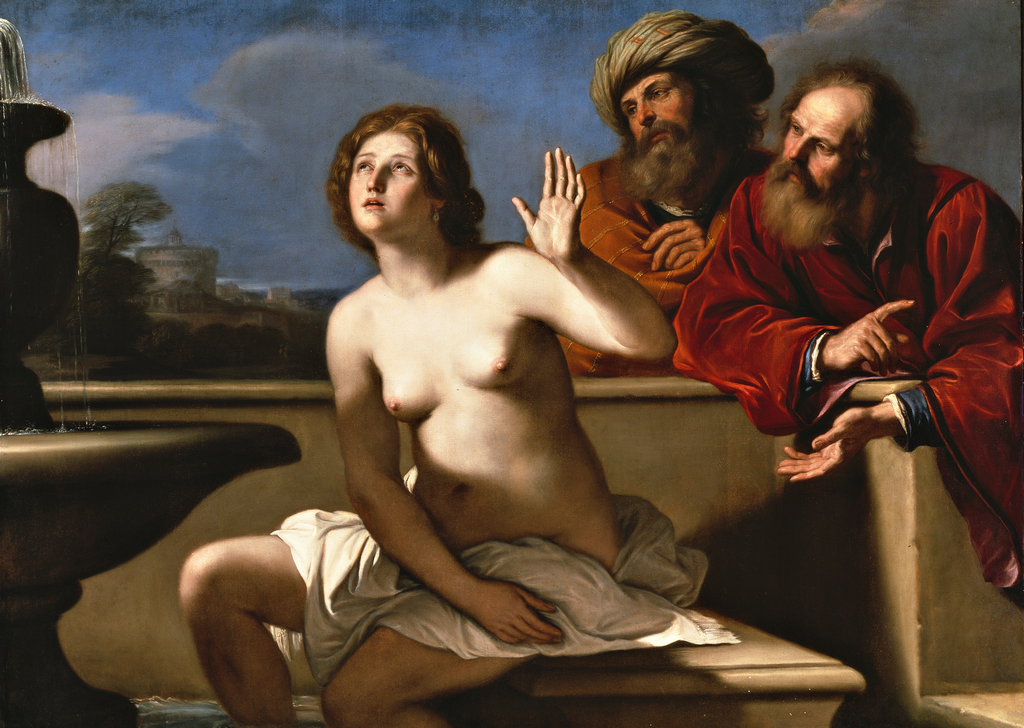
1650 Guercino

Modern representations depict Susanna as either alone, unaware of being watched, or uncomfortable with it. By the mid 19th century, portrayals often did not include the elders, and the only spectator was the viewer of the painting.

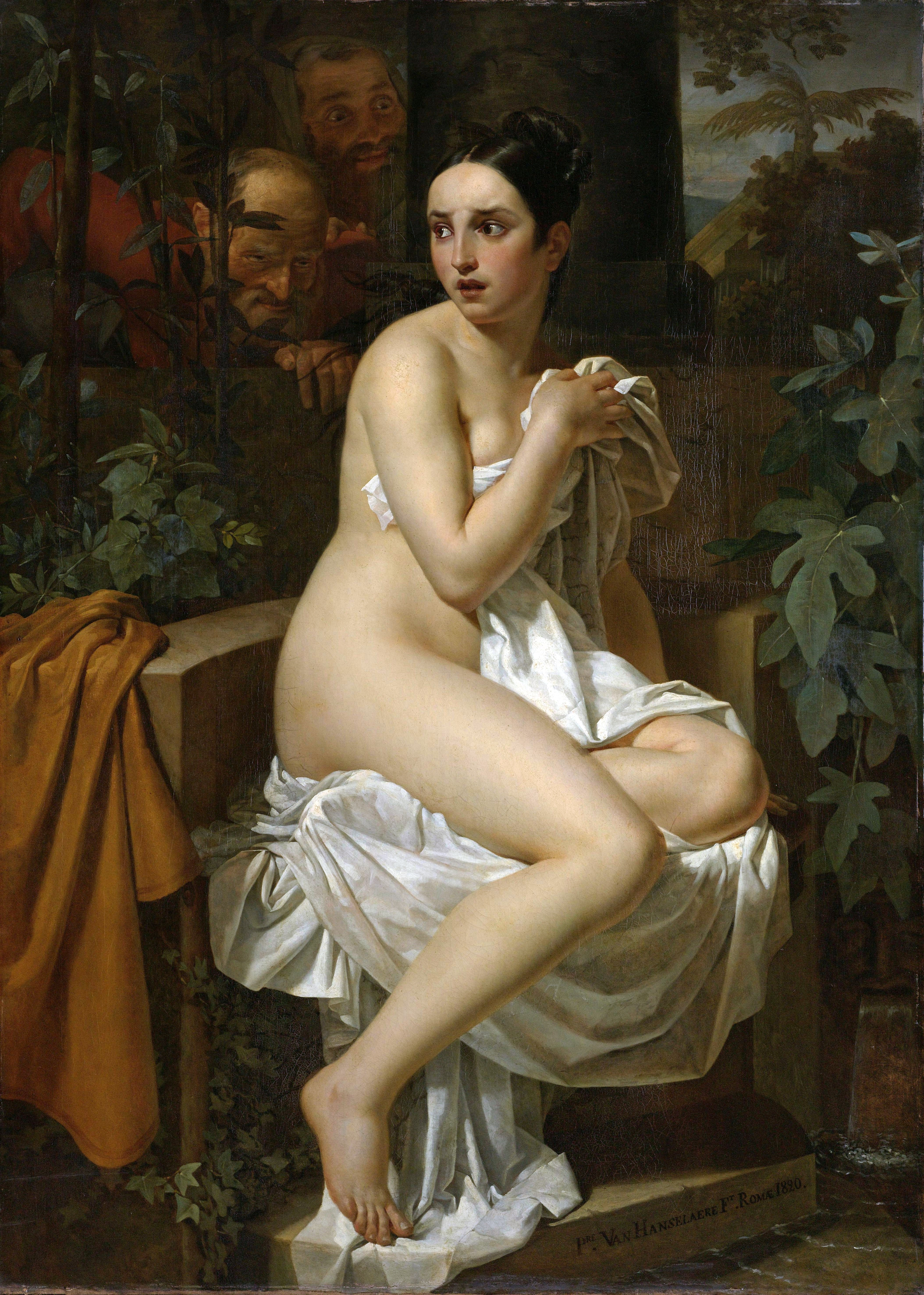
1810 Pierre Van Hanselaere

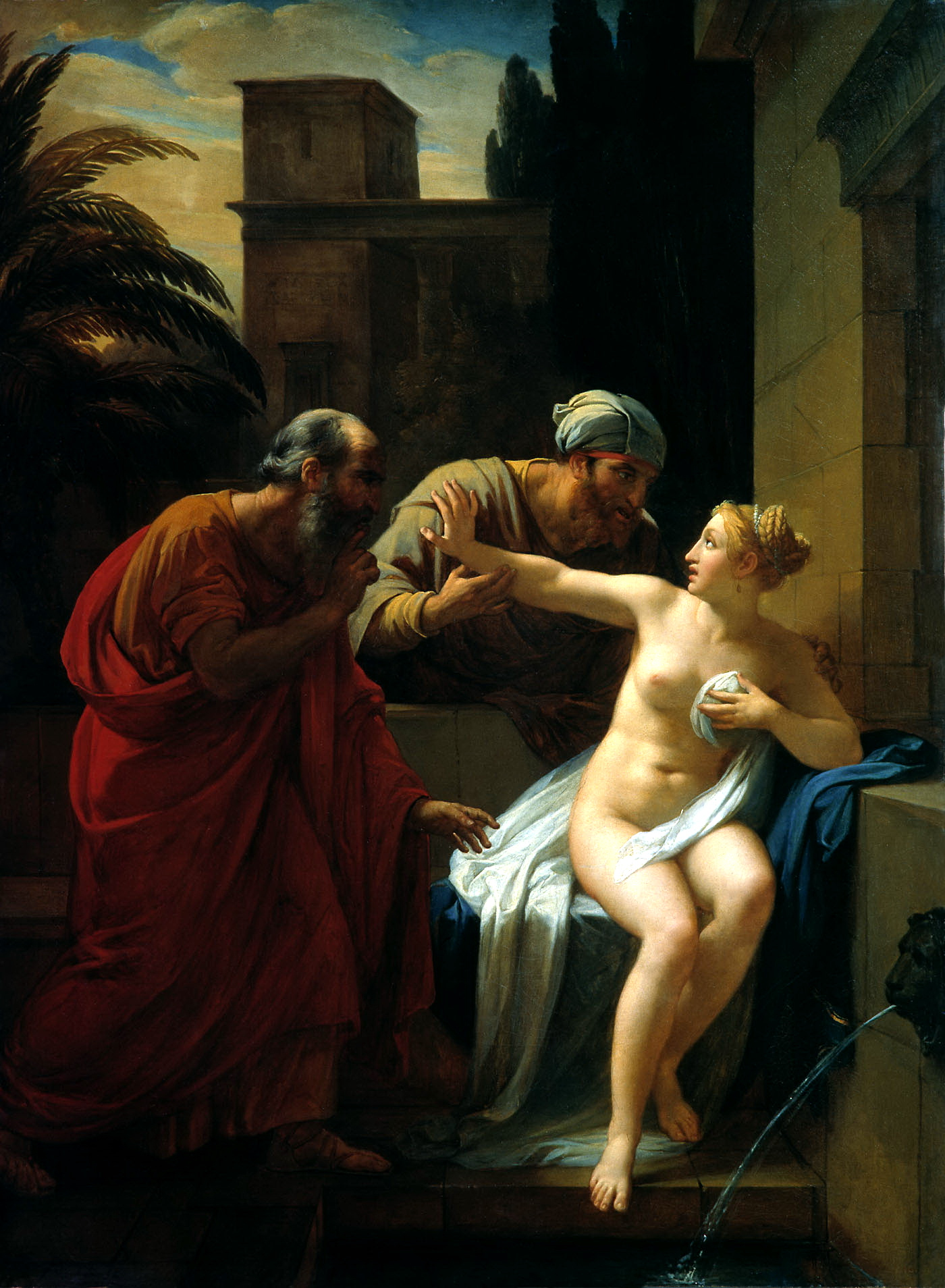
1822 Pyotr Basin

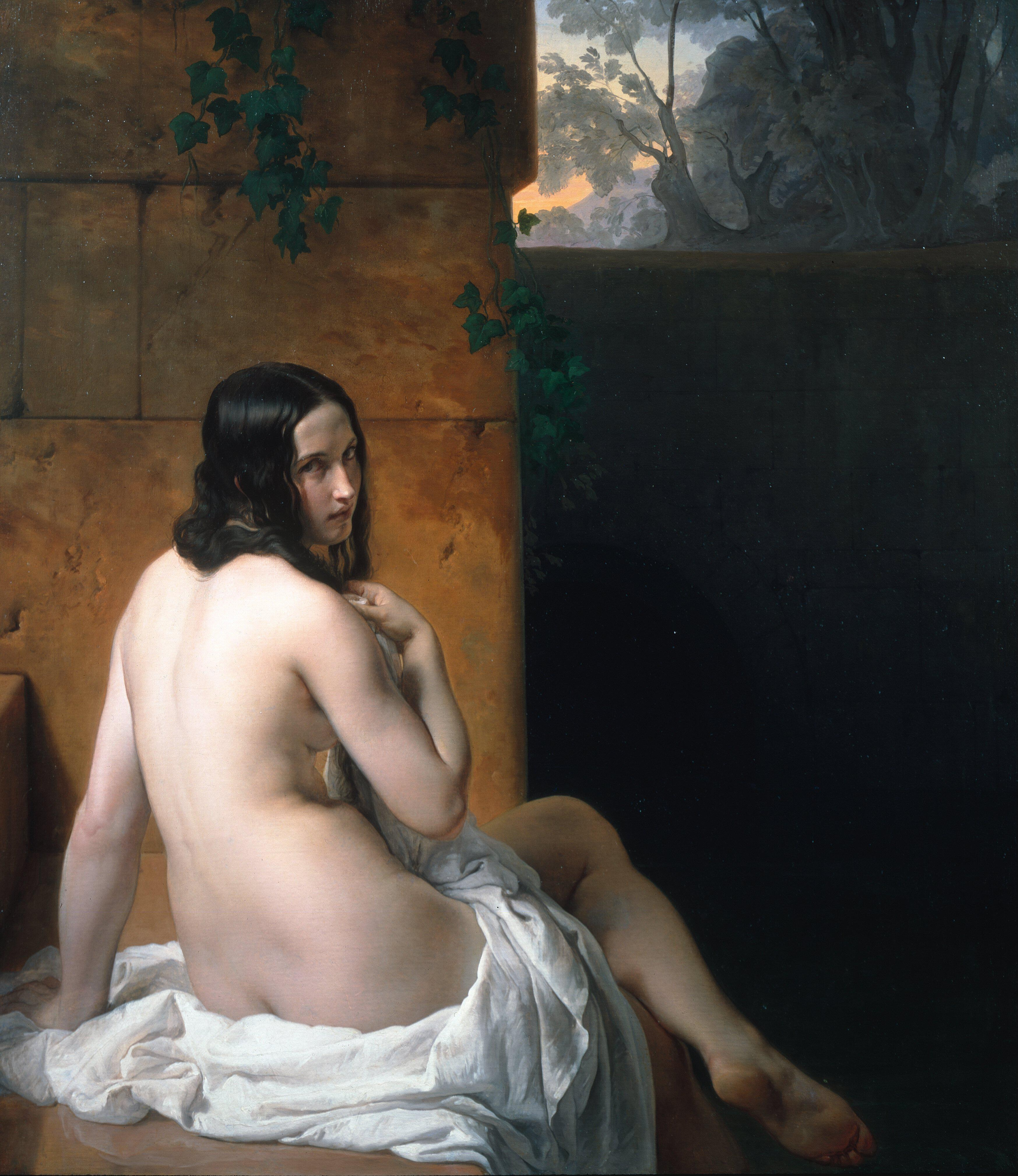
1850 Francesco Hayez

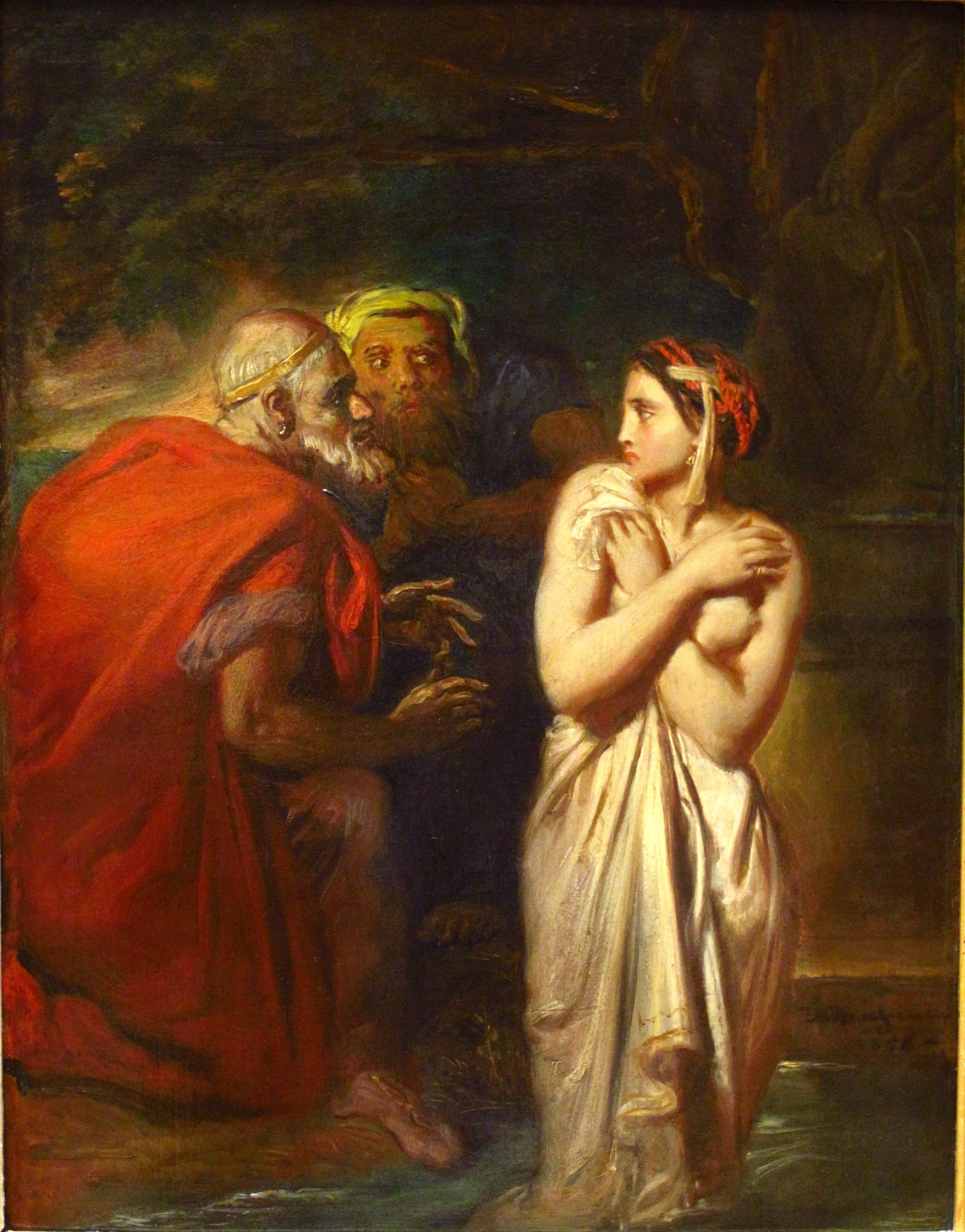
1856 Théodore Chassériau

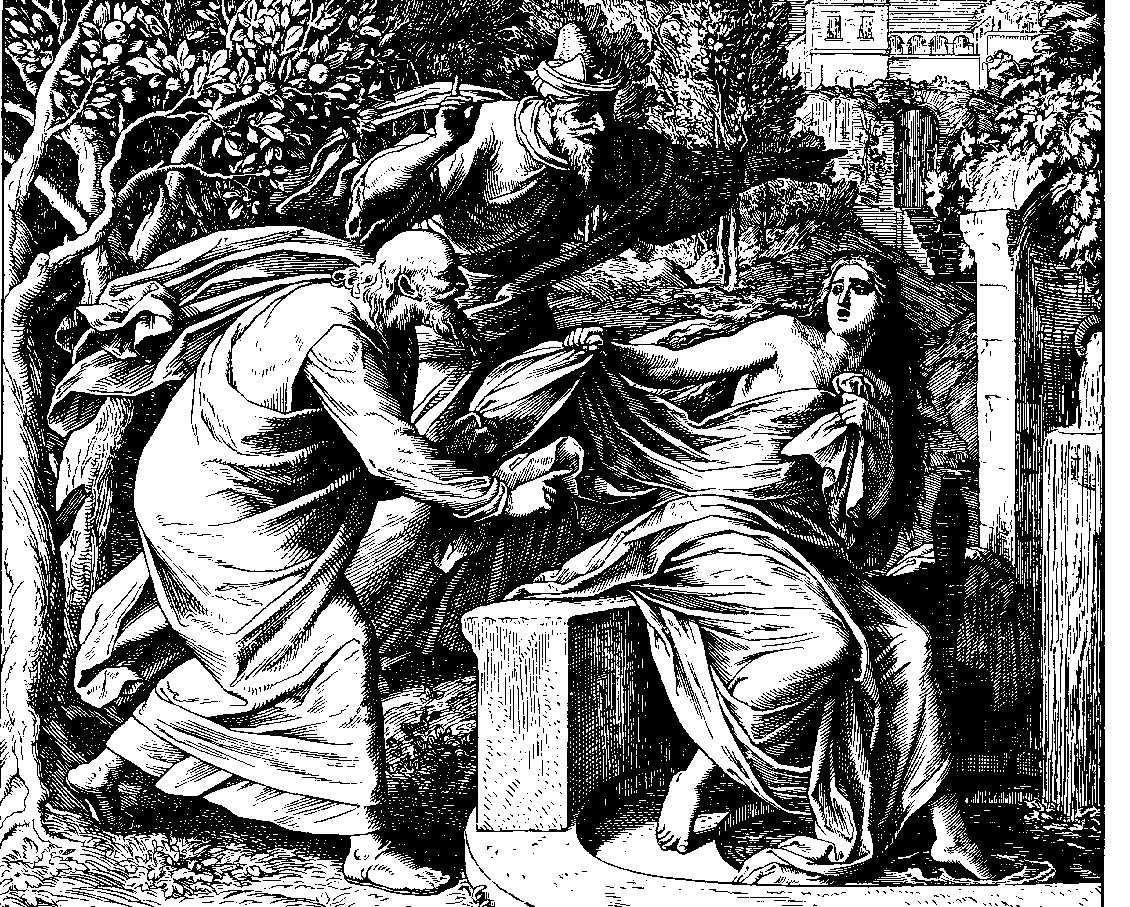
1860 Julius Schnorr von Karolsfeld

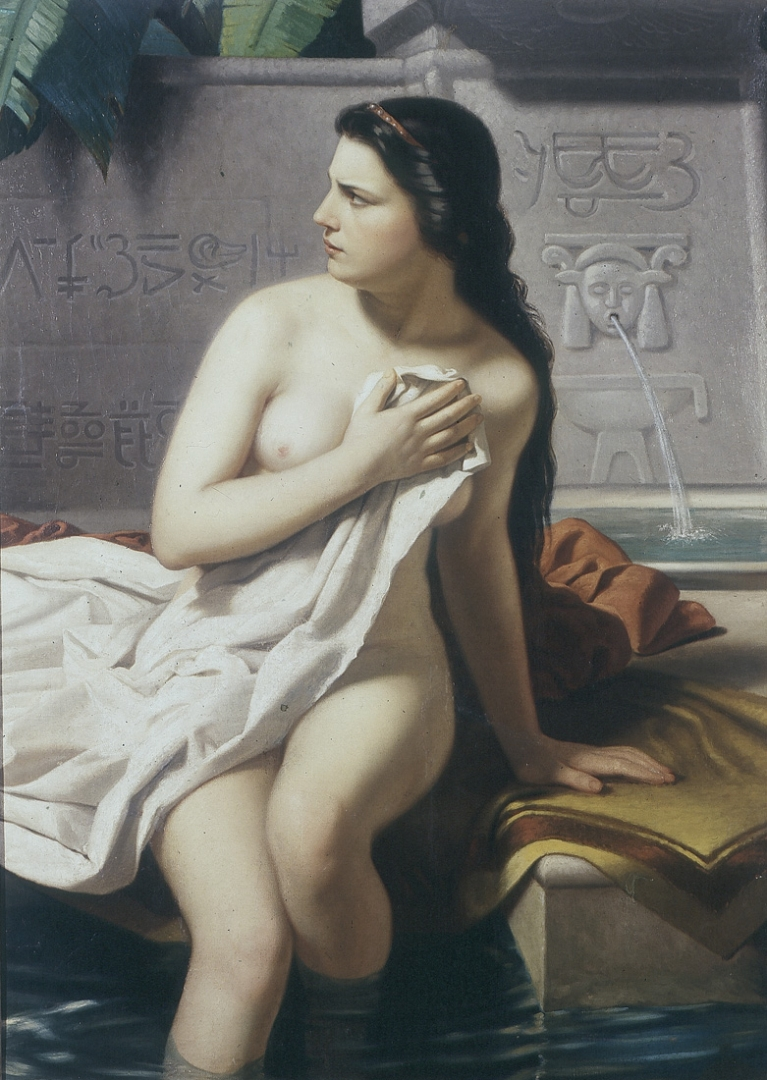
1862 Juan Manuel Blanes

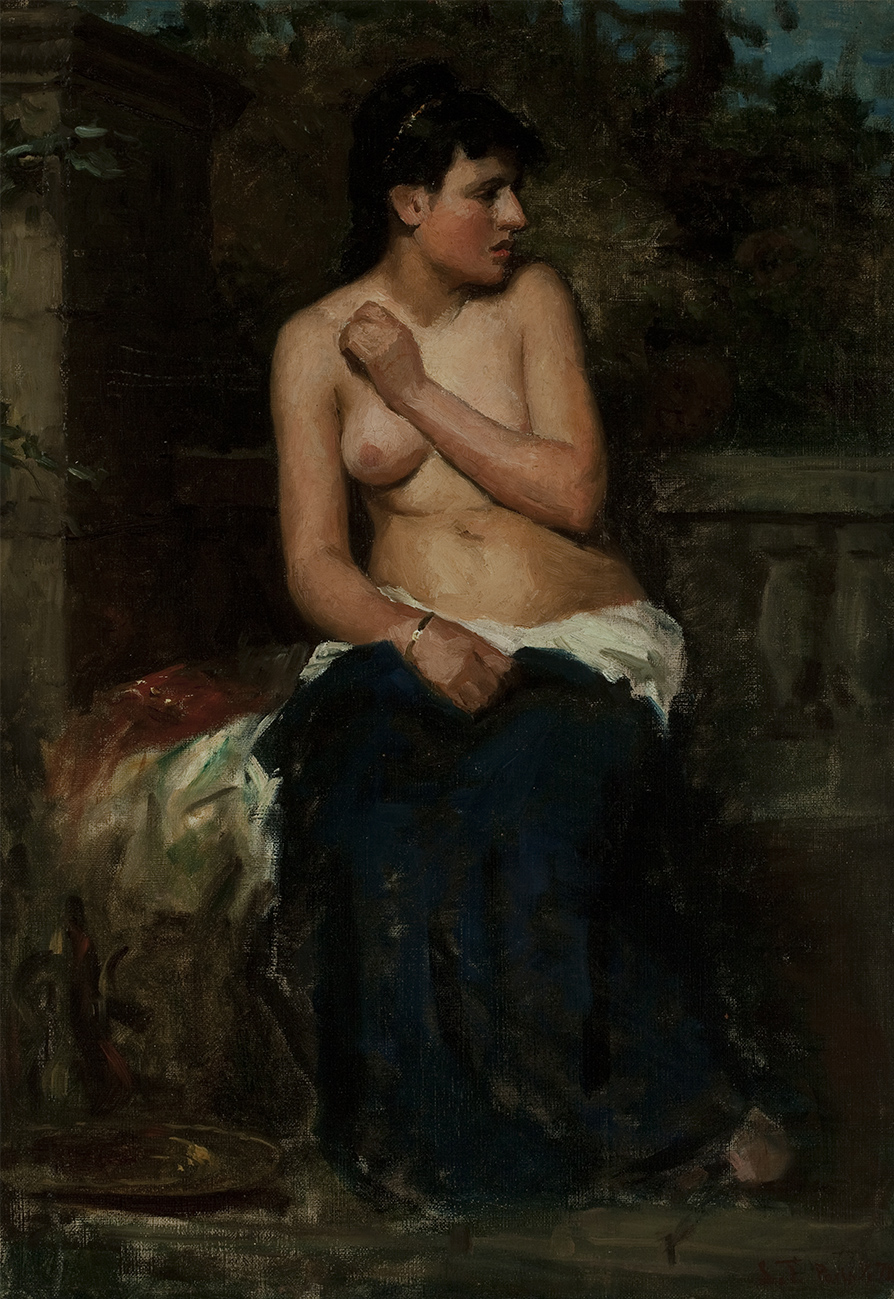
1878 Laurits Tuxen

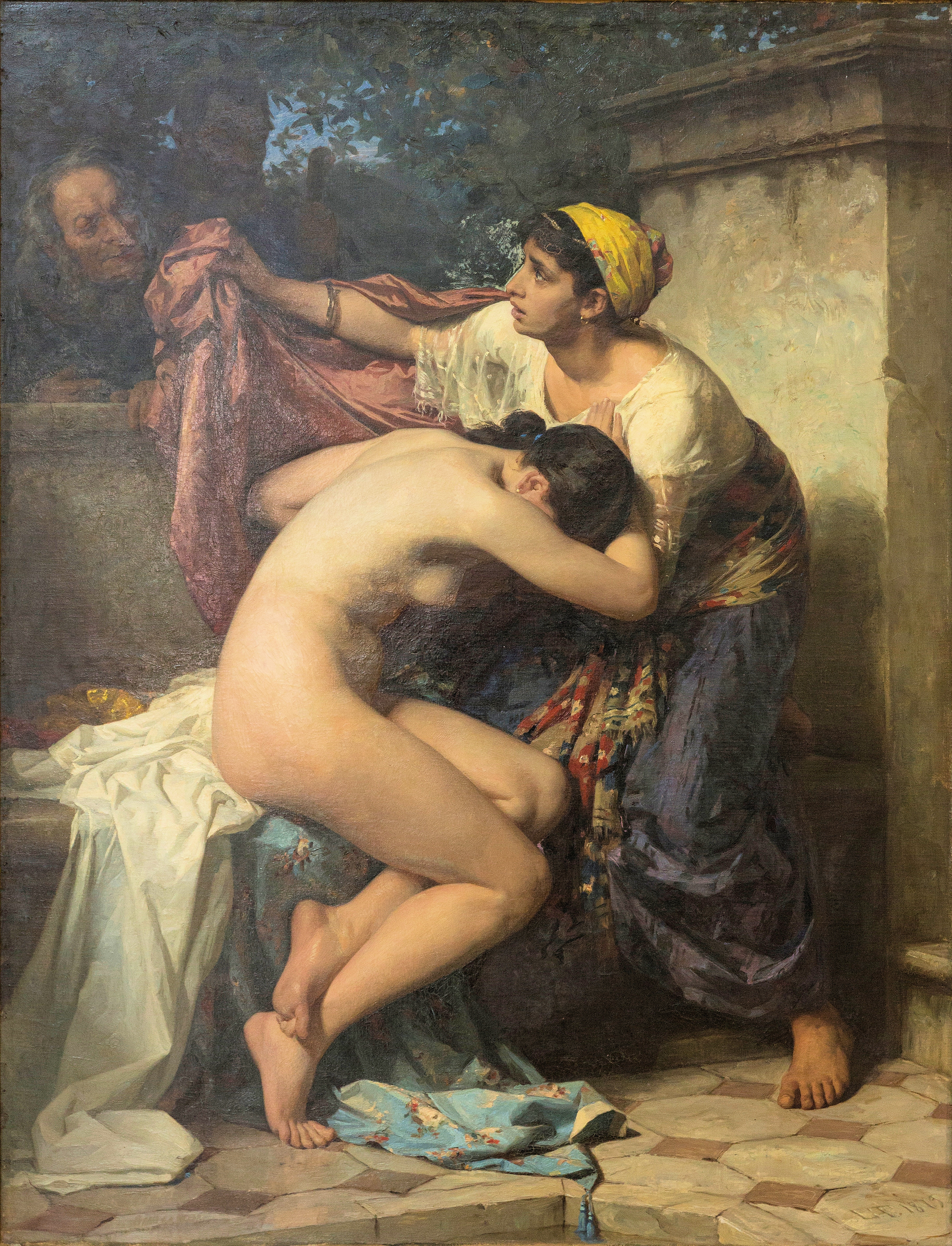
1879 Laurits Tuxen

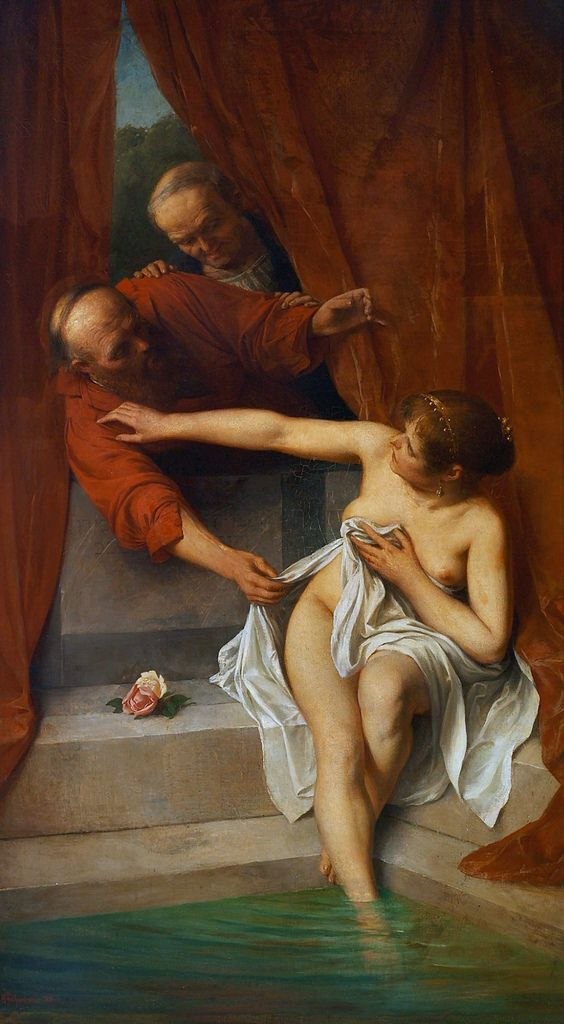
c.1908 Max Fuhrmann der Ältere

== Artists creating multiple images ==
Susanna and the Elders, like many scenes featuring naked women and clothed men, was a popular subject, and many artists created multiple paintings during their careers.

=== Tintoretto 1550–1580s ===
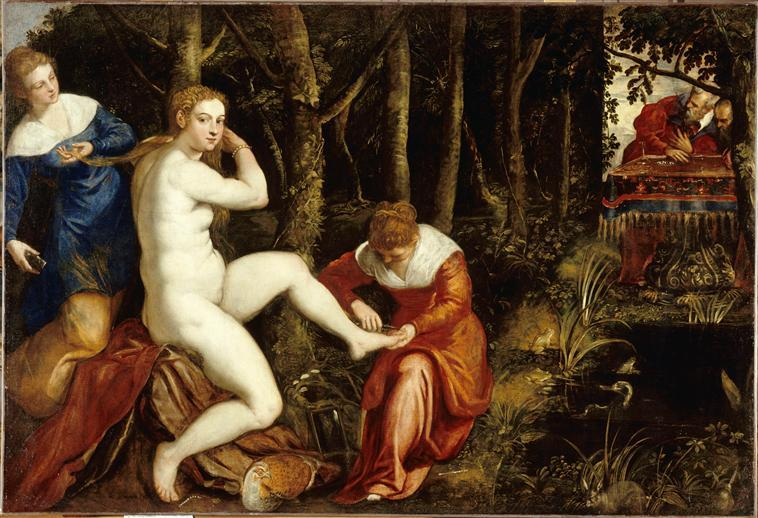
c. 1550–1560

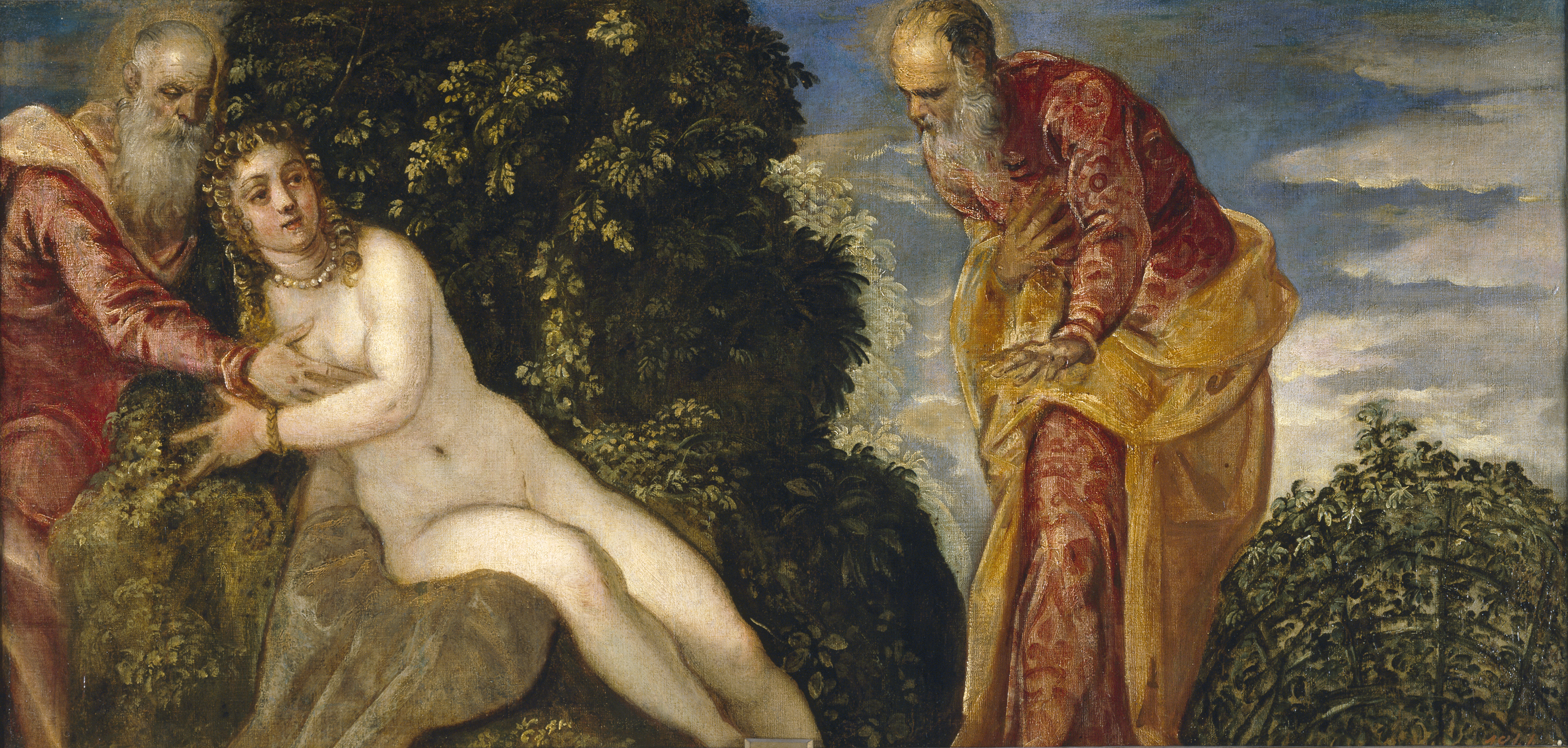
c.1552–1555

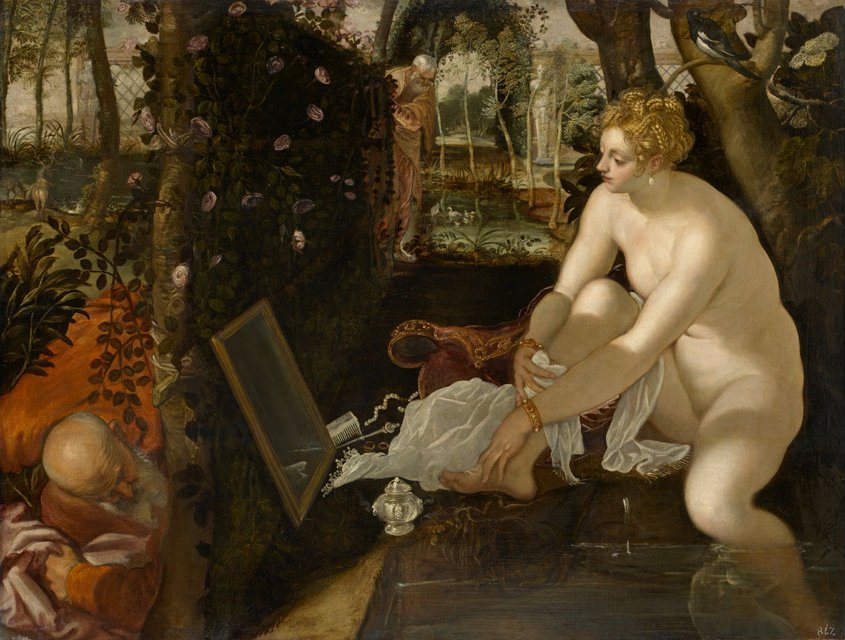
c. 1555

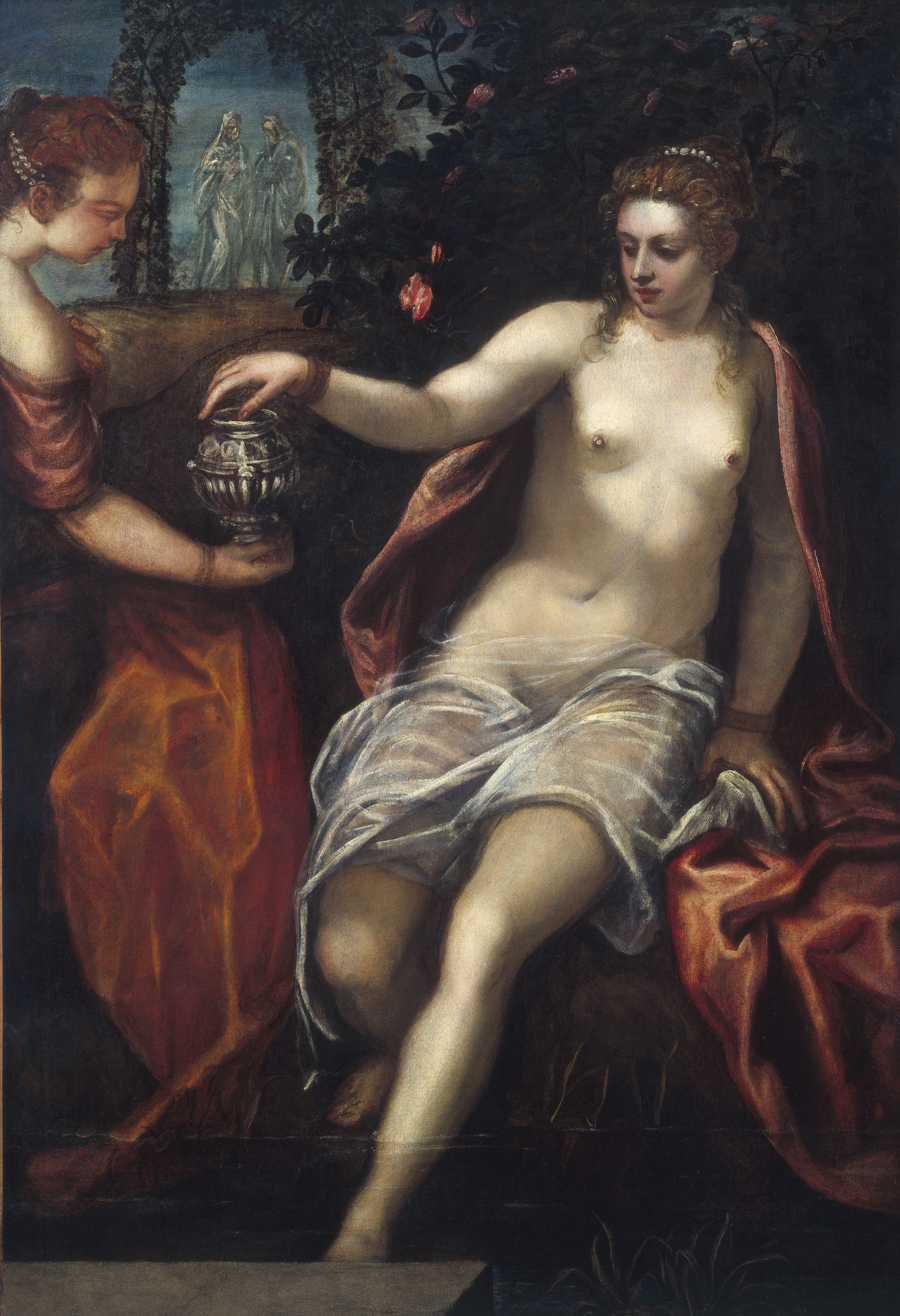
c.1580s

=== Rubens 1607–? ===
Rubens in his late 1630s portrayal places Susanna under an apple tree rather than a mastic or oak, a nod to Eve, the garden of Eden, and resisting, according to Mark Leach, "supreme temptation"; according to Garrard, the implication by both Leach and Rubens is that Susanna had to be very strong-willed indeed to resist the overwhelming attraction of being coerced into sex by two elderly lechers. In 1886 Max Rooses called the Rubens depictions a "gallant enterprise mounted by two bold adventurers", which Garard called an example of a "remarkable testament to the indomitable male ego."

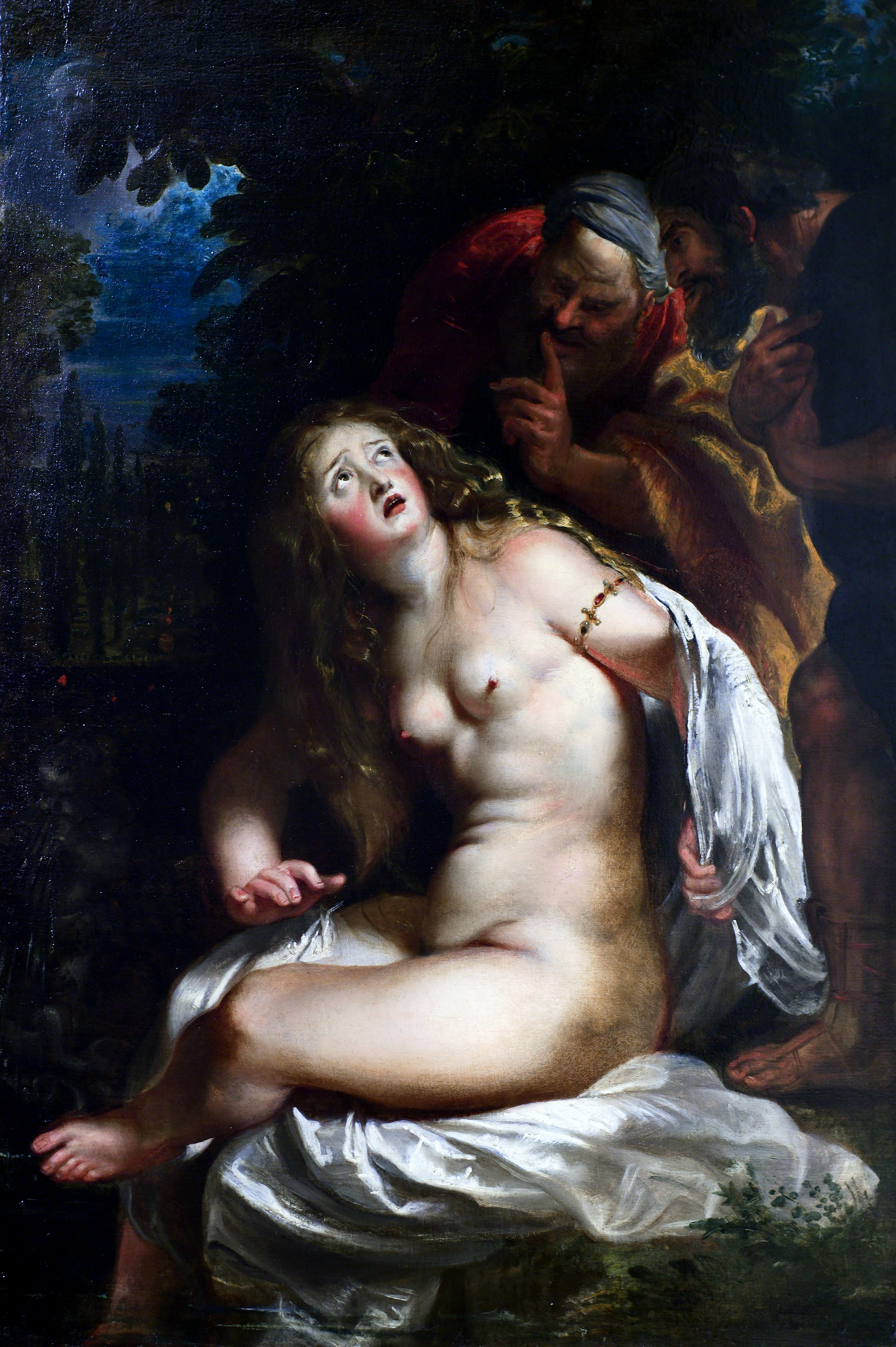
1607

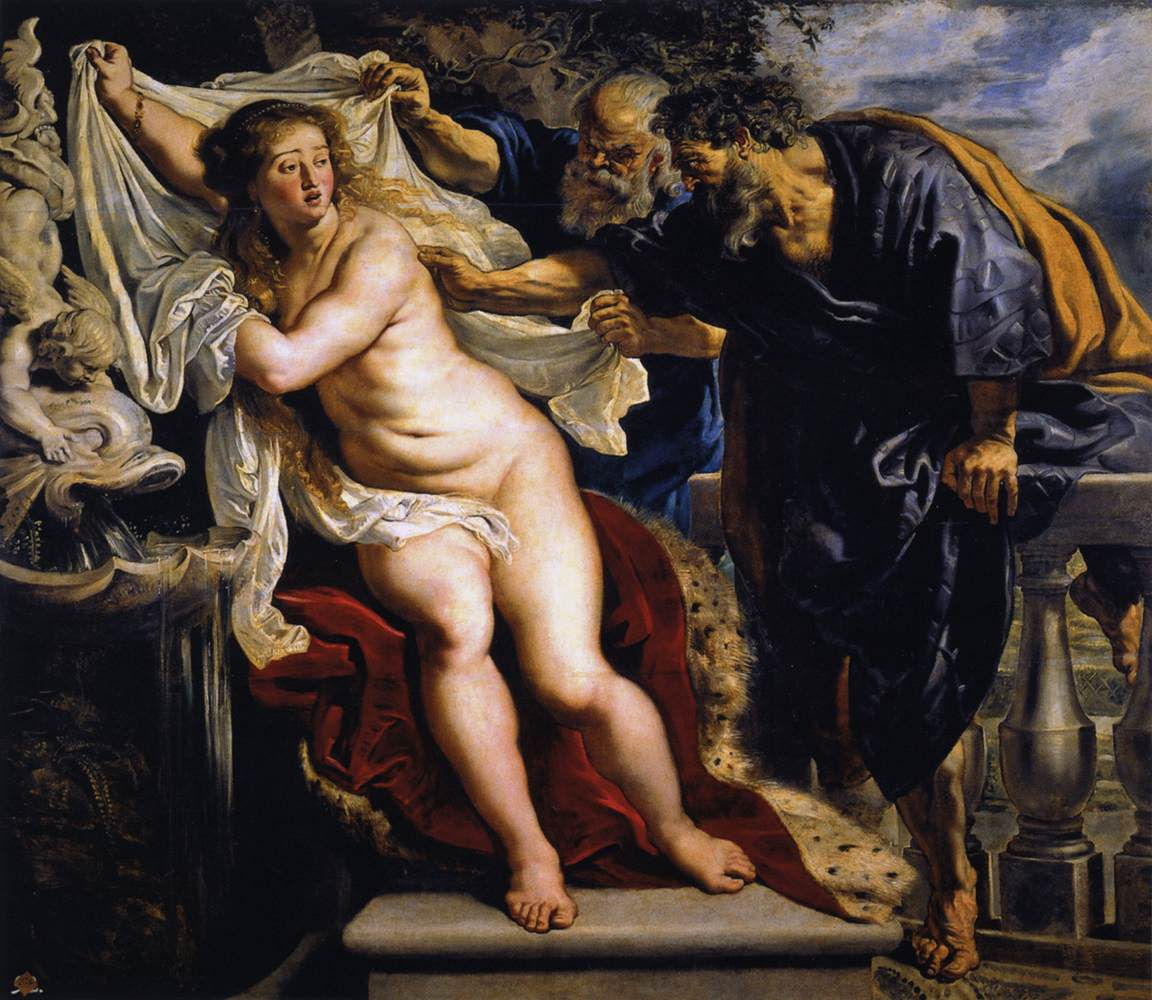
c.1609–1610

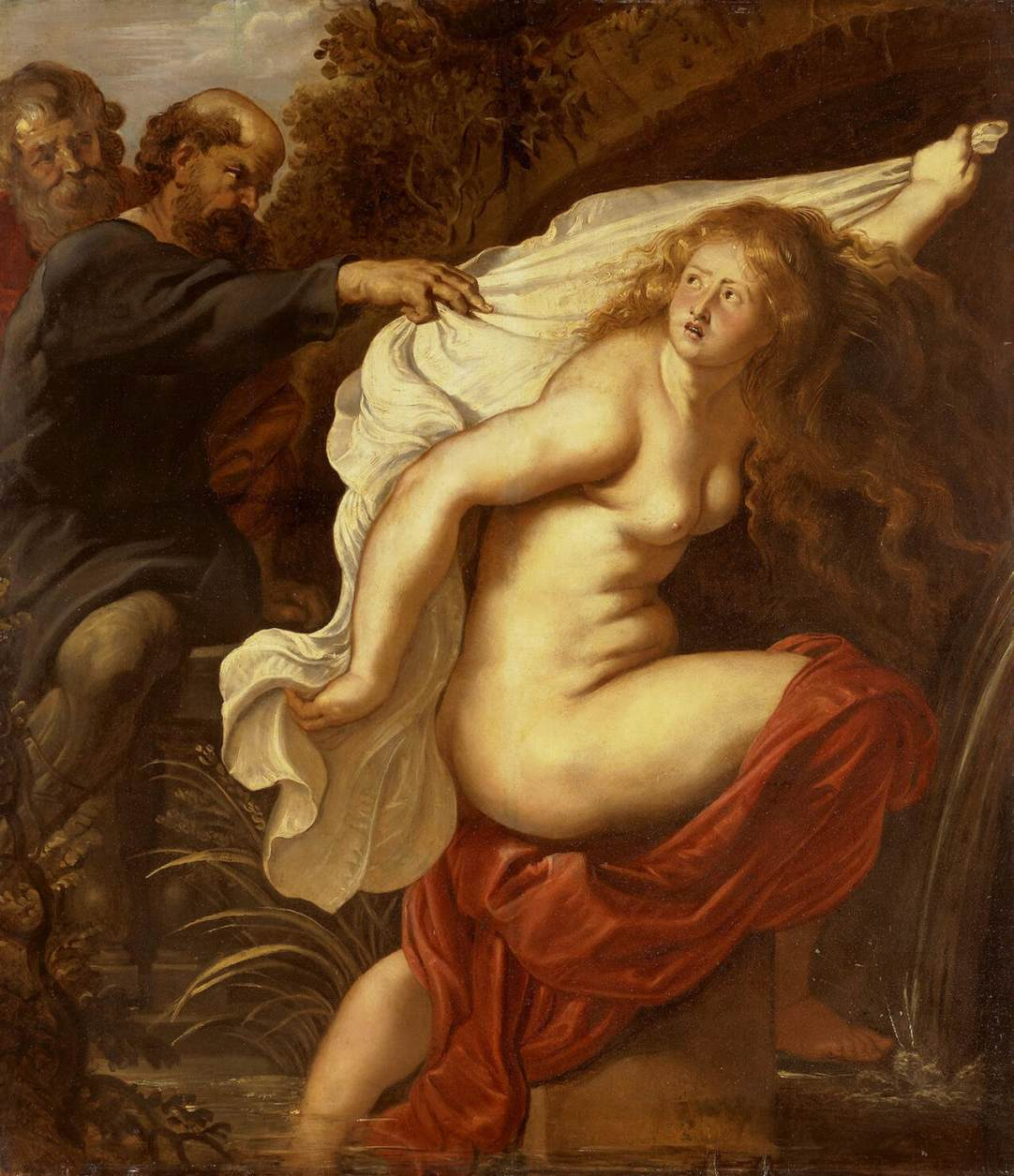
1611

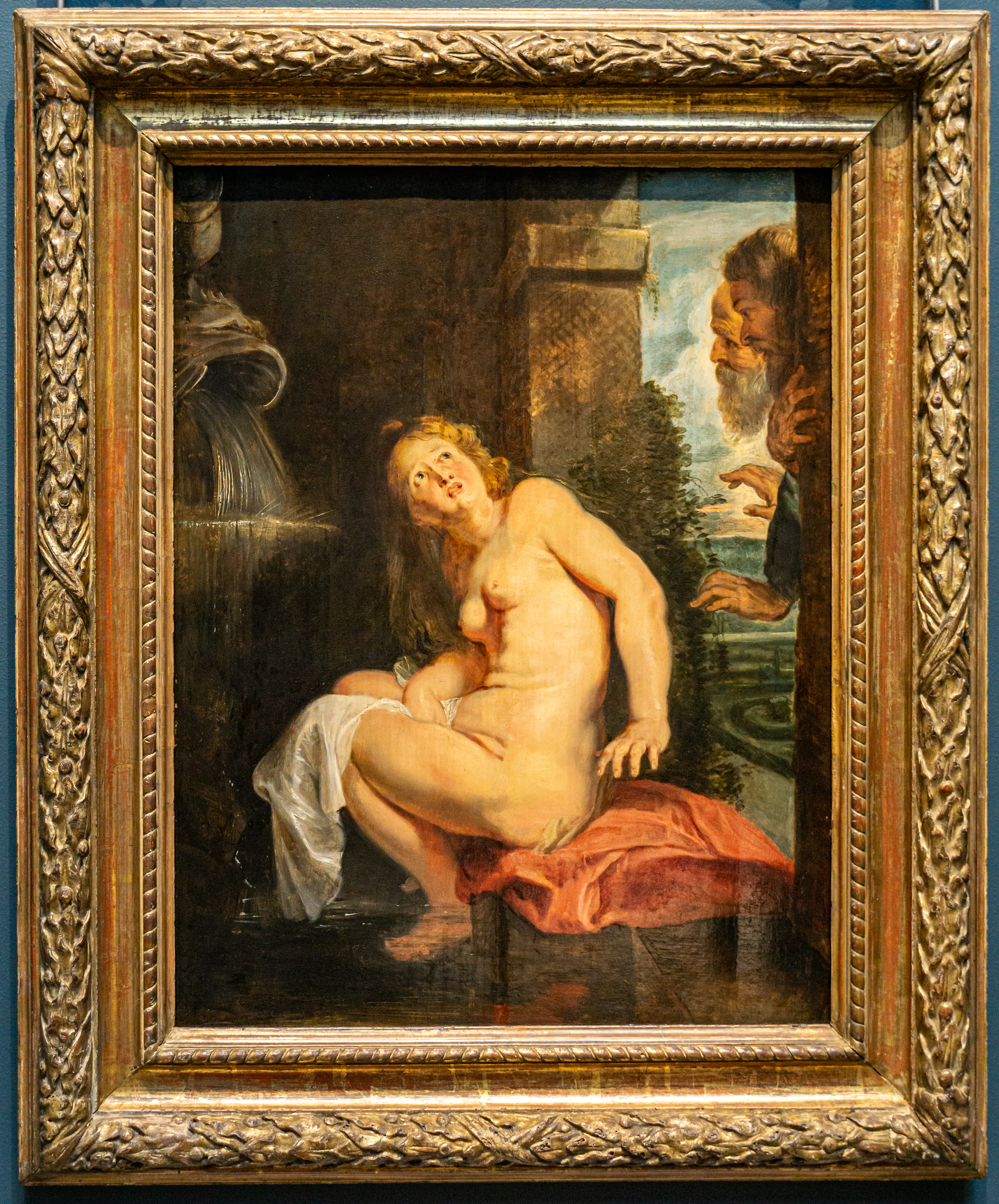
1614

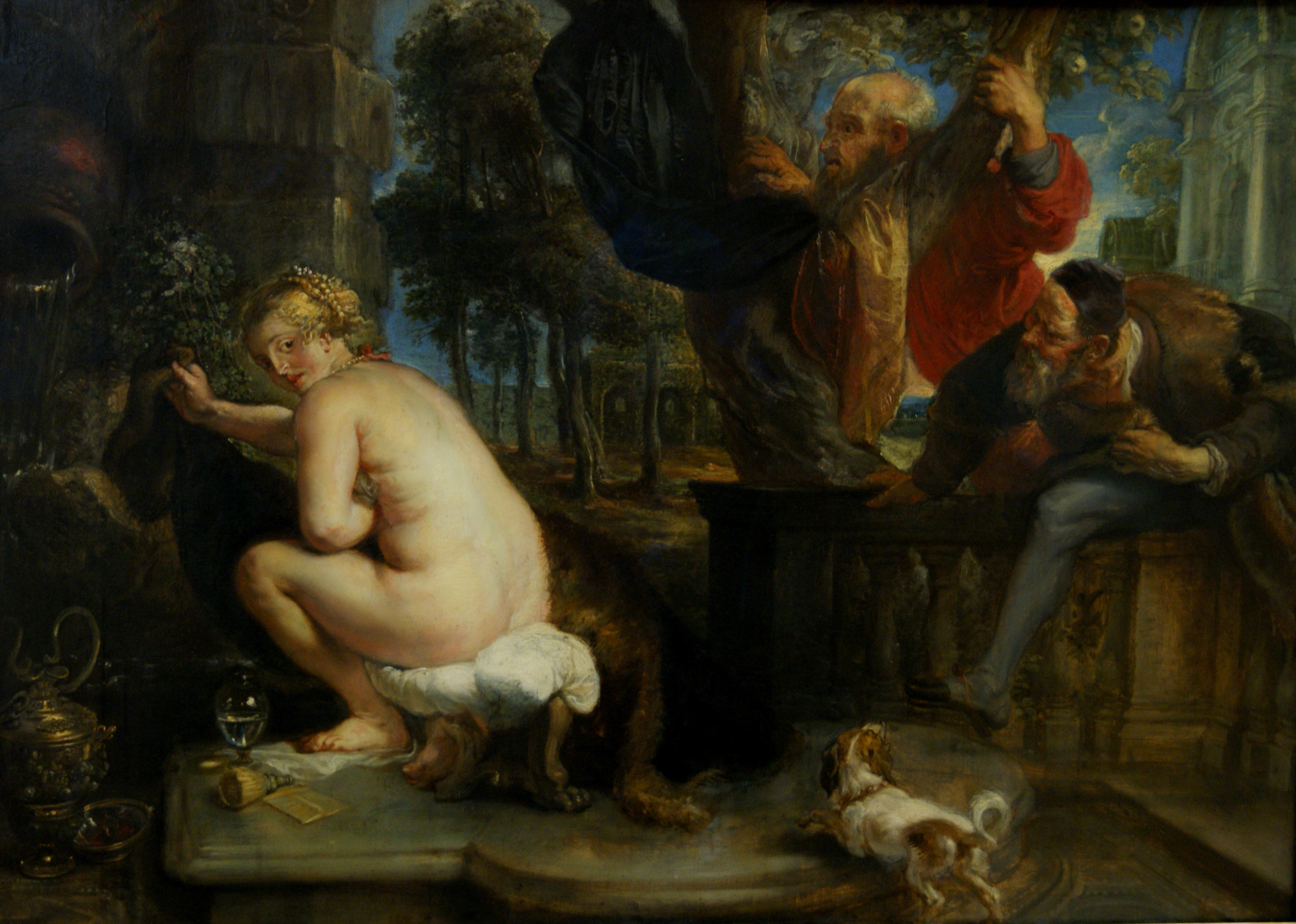
c. 1636–1639

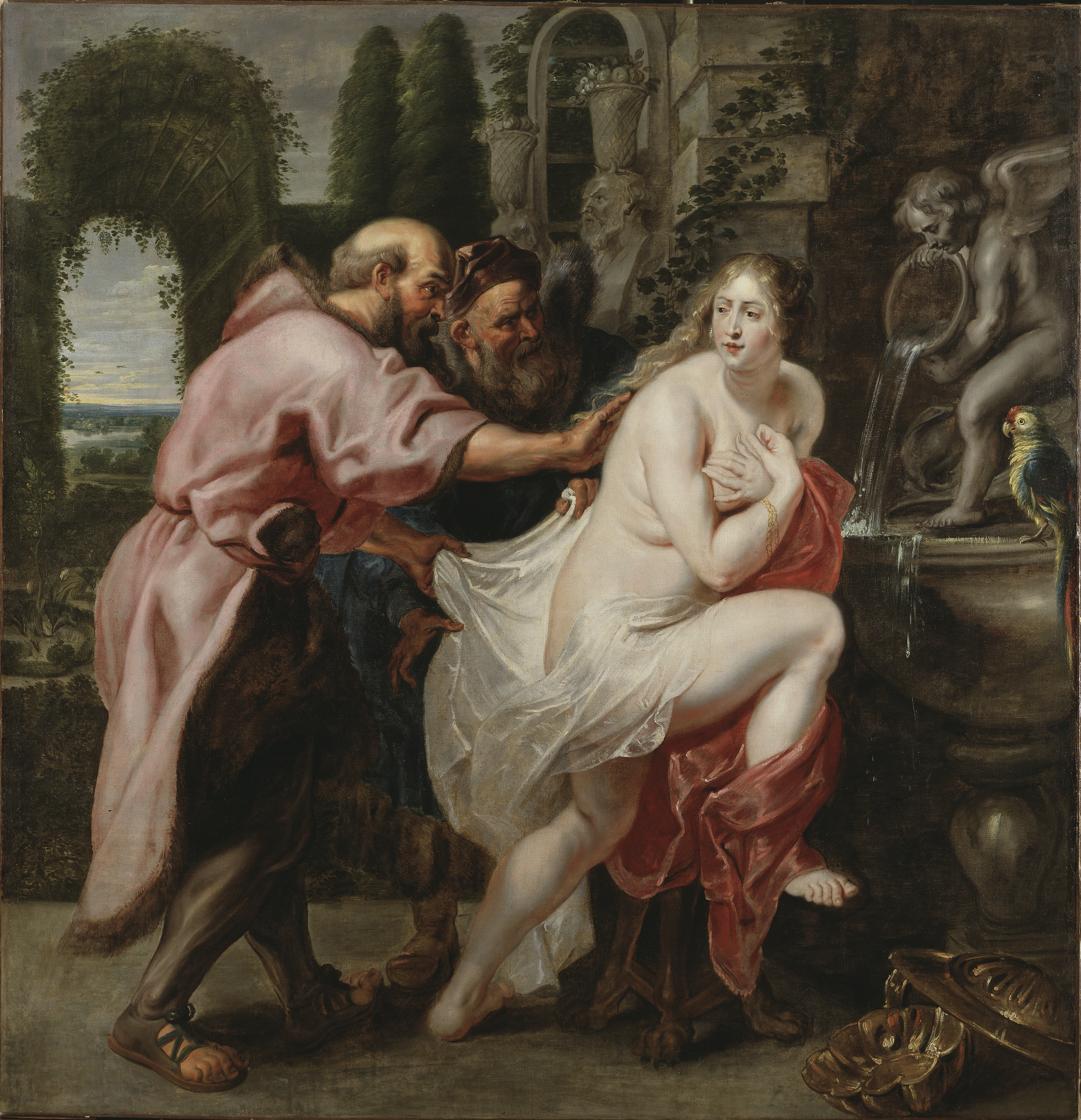
(unknown date)

=== Artemisia Gentileschi 1610–1652 ===
Artemisia Gentileschi produced her first portrayal in 1610 when she was seventeen years old. The painting is considered one of the earliest to portray Susanna as clearly distressed at being watched; according to Christiansen and Mann, "no other artist had interpreted the psychological dimension" of the story. According to Mary Garrard, the painting used an explicitly feminine point of view and provided an "unorthodox interpretation" of the scene, calling out Garrard's surprise that until she did so in 1982, no attention had been paid by art scholars to that unorthodoxy. Garrard notes the similarity in composition to that of the 1590 Annibale Carracci but points out the vastly different feeling; Carracci's Susanna appears to be "sexually available and responsive" while Gentileschi's is clearly distressed. Carracci's lushly planted garden is replaced by a stark stone bench and balustrade. The painting communicates Susanna's unhappiness rather than focussing on the sexual pleasure the elders are coercing her for. It is unique in that the two elders are shown whispering to one another, emphasizing the plot between them. Garrard wrote that "in no other version of the subject known to me are the Elders shown whispering to one another".

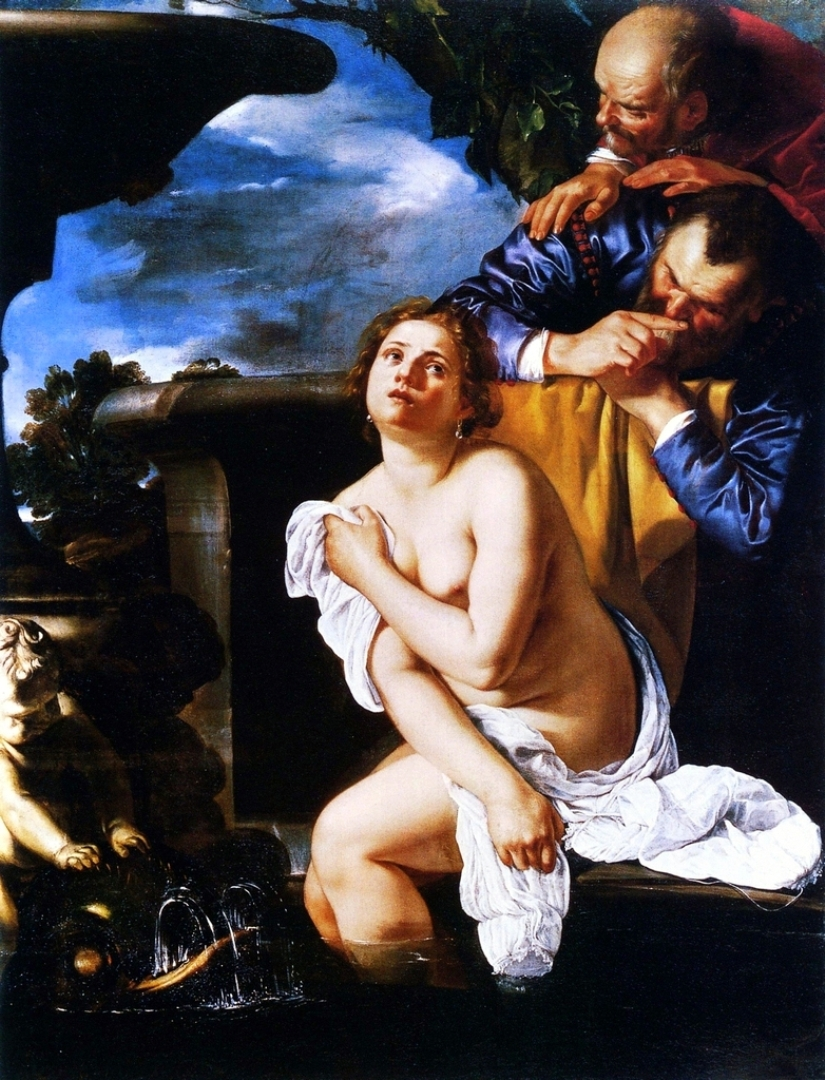
Artemisia Gentileschi,1622

In early 1611, Gentileschi was raped by Agostino Tassi, whom her father, Orazio Gentileschi, had hired to teach Artemisia, and a second man, Cosimo Quorli. In Tassi's ensuing trial, Artemisia was subjected to thumbscrew, Tassi was convicted but his conviction later overturned, and Gentileschi's reputation was ruined. During the trial she testified that Tassi and Quorli pressured her for sex, accusing her of already having had sex with a servant, a further similarity to Susanna's story. Garrard has speculated that Gentileschi may have already been receiving unwanted attention from Tassi during the period she painted the 1610 portrayal. She points out that the painting is not about rape but about the threat of rape. According to Christiansen and Mann, Gianni Papi identified the elders as having been modeled after Tassi and Orazio. Garrard points out that the Elder on the left in her painting is a "thick-haired younger man", which was "highly unusual in Susanna pictures"; Tassi was in his thirties at the time of the rape. Gina Siciliano points out that the elders "bore the dark curls of Agostino Tassi and the balding sleaziness of Cosimo Quorli." In 1612 Gentileschi completed Judith Slaying Holofernes which some scholars and commenters have interpreted as visual revenge.

The attribution of the painting and its date have both been challenged, but Garrard's 1982 attribution and dating have since been accepted by most scholars. Some believe Orazio must have at least provided guidance.

Gentileschi eventually produced at least three more paintings depicting the incident, typically also showing Susanna as clearly distressed, along with one other possibility which has since been lost and may be the work of Gianfranco Loredan. Her second painting, which does not conform to the dramatic style of her other depictions of Susanna, was in the eighteenth century attributed to Gentileschi, in the nineteenth century to Caravaggio, but in 1968 reattributed to Gentileschi, although Garrard has questioned this as recently as 2001 due to the unusual format of the signature and because Susana's expression is "sharply out of character for the artist". Christiansen and Mann argue that this may simply be evidence of Gentileschi's adaptability. Susana in this portrayal is as described in Apocrypha, which says that "through her tears she looked up toward Heaven"; Christiansen and Mann speculate that the differences in the depiction may have been at the direction of a patron.

Gentileschi's 1649 painting combines two moments in the story, which was common in 17th century portrayals: Susanna's rejection of the men's advances as in the 1610 painting, and the casting of her eyes to heaven as in the 1622. Christiansen and Mann wrote that Gentileschi took "a far more traditional interpretation" of the story than her similarly composed but very different in style and feel 1610 painting.

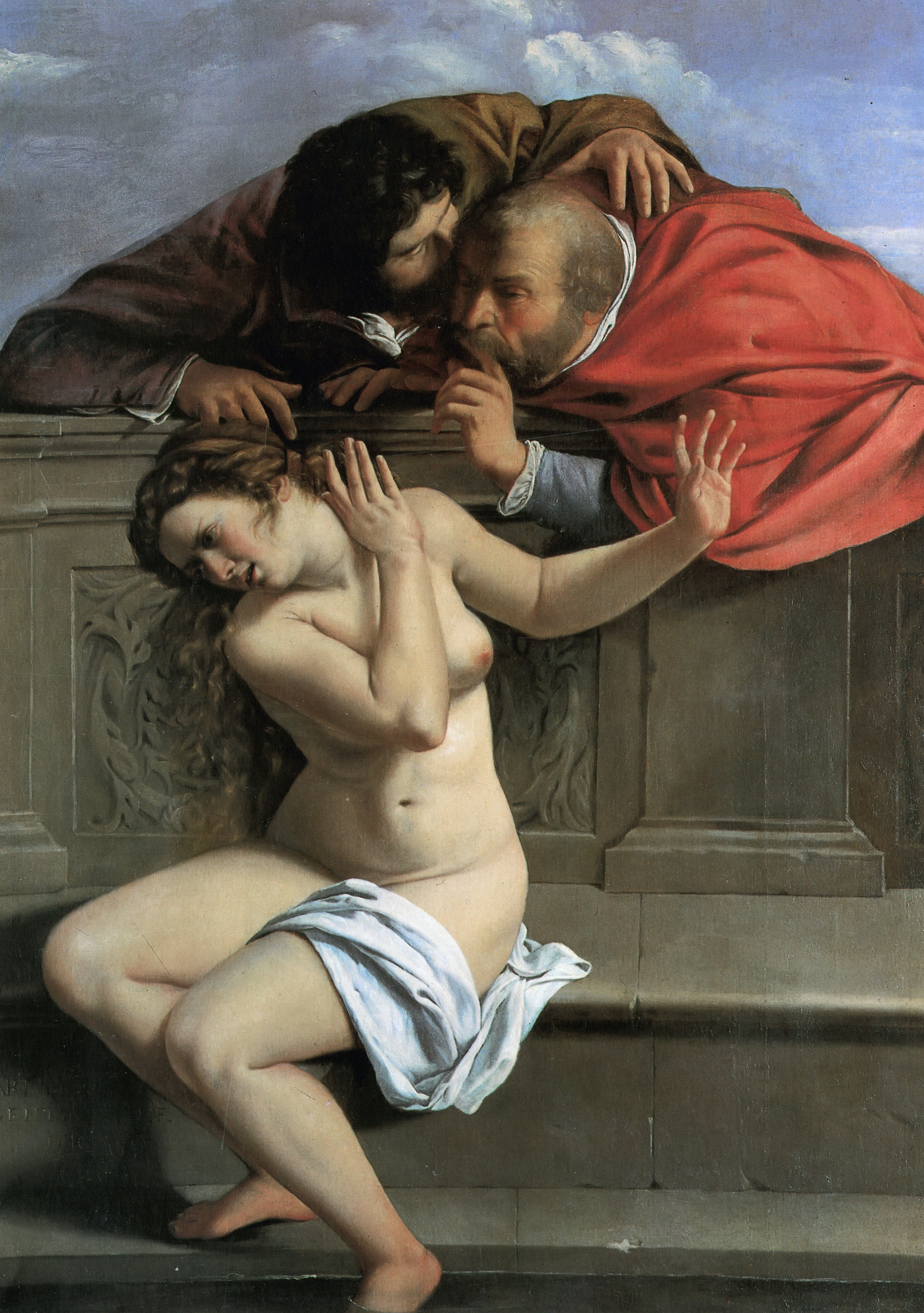
1610

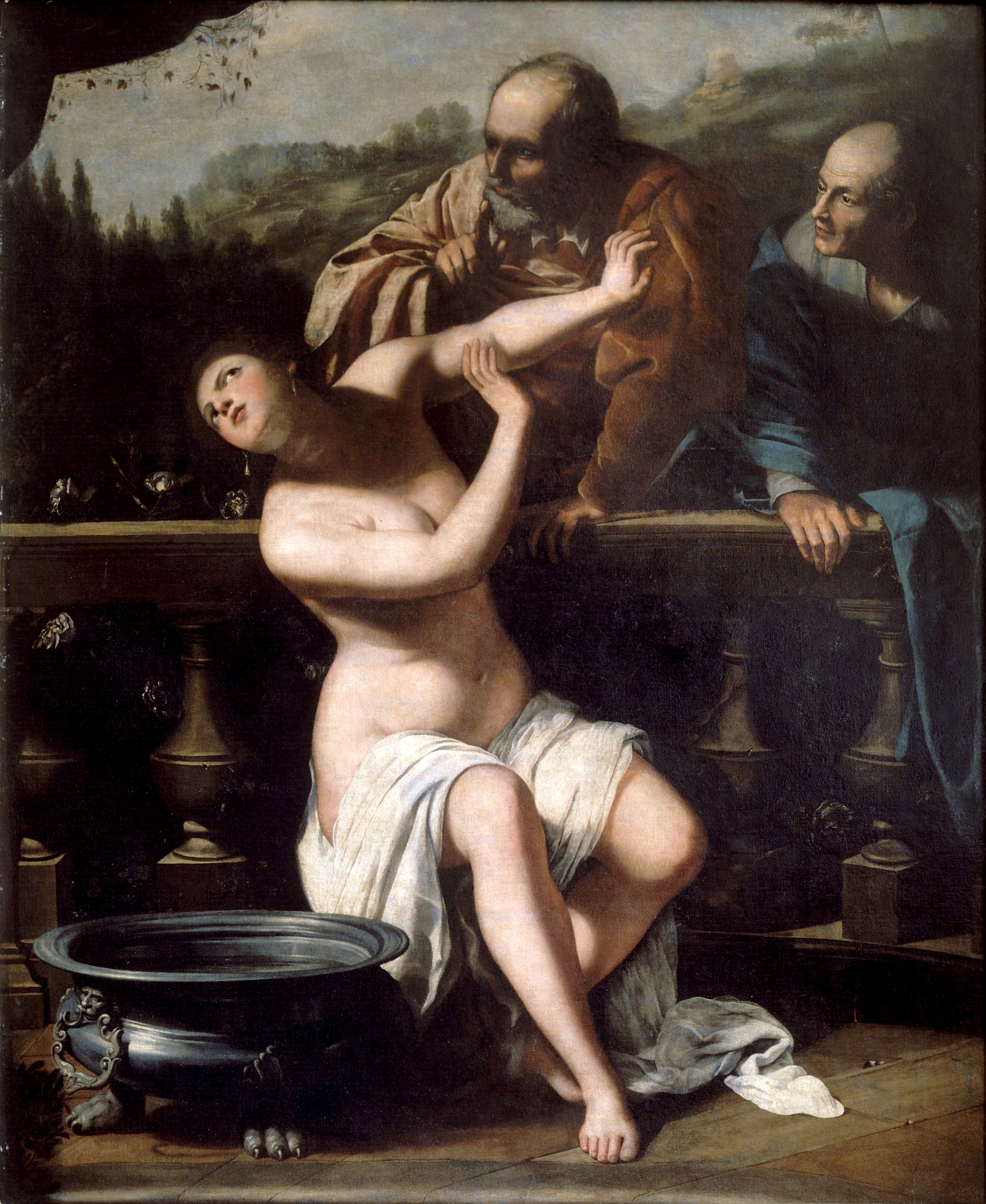
1649

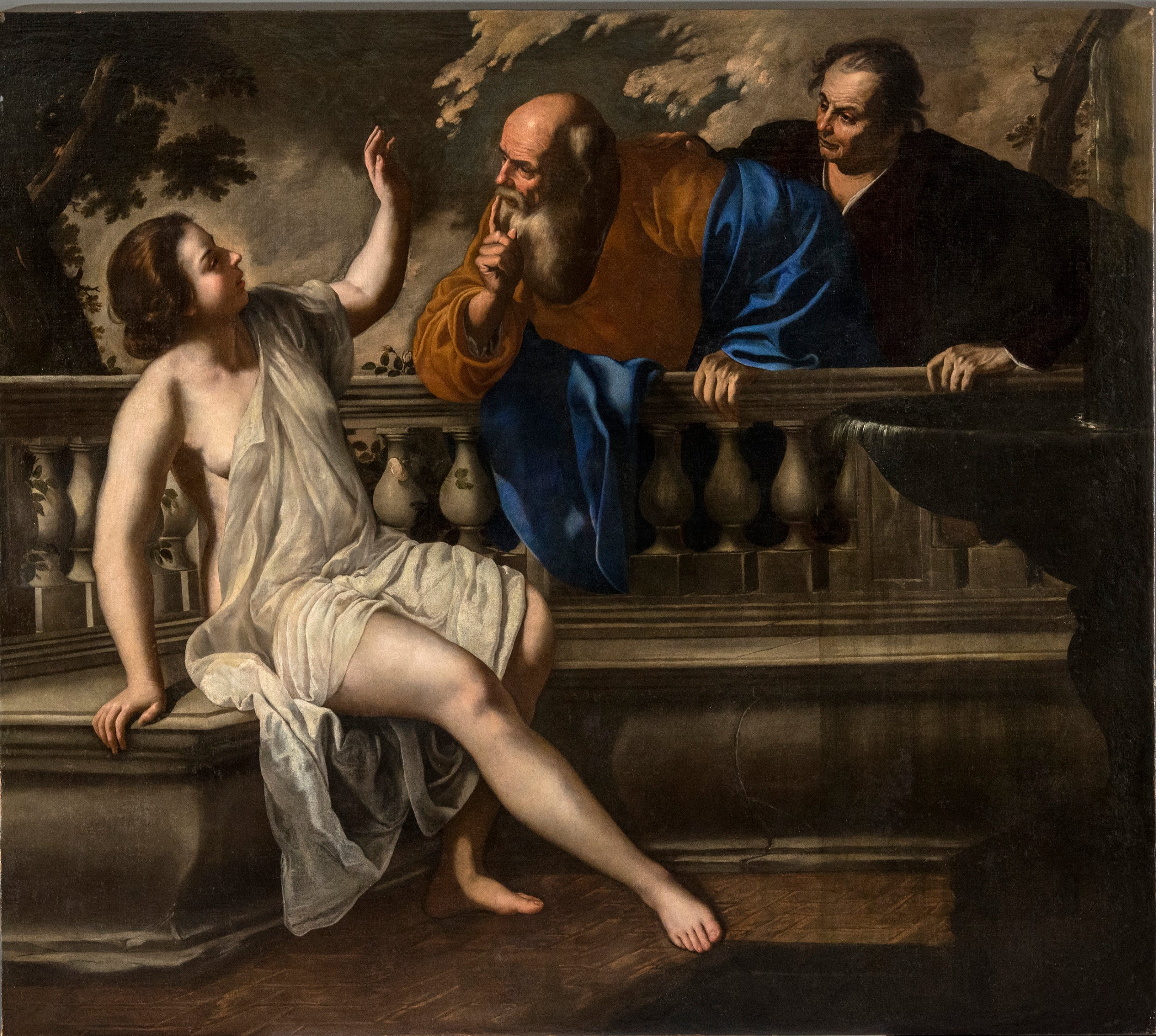
1652

=== Rembrandt 1636–1647 ===
Garrard calls Rembrandt's 1647 portrayal one of the more sympathetic to Susanna, portraying her as very young and innocent, but she points out the resemblance to the Venus de Medici, a work considered very sexual in nature because the figure, in attempting to conceal herself, draws attention to herself.

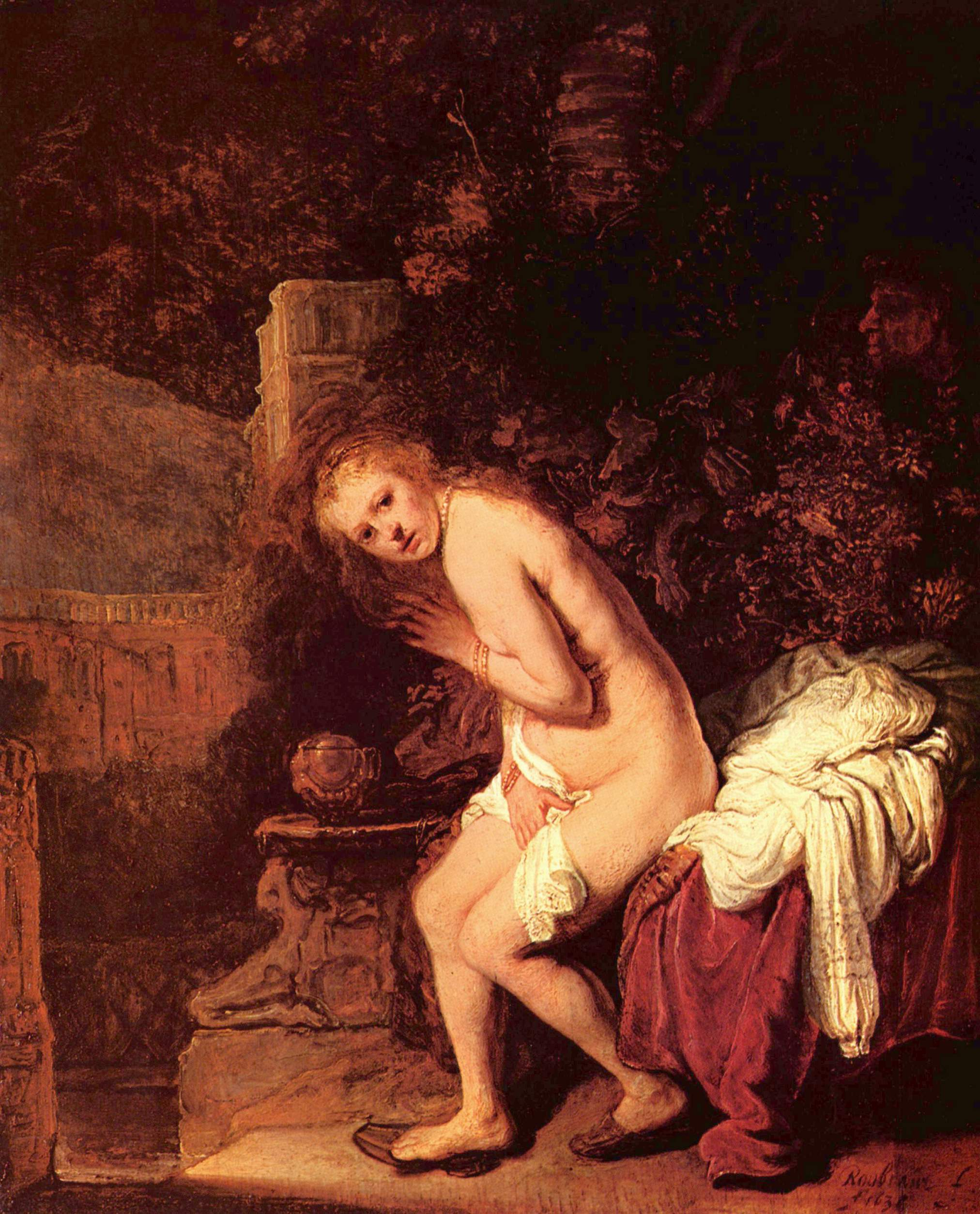
1636

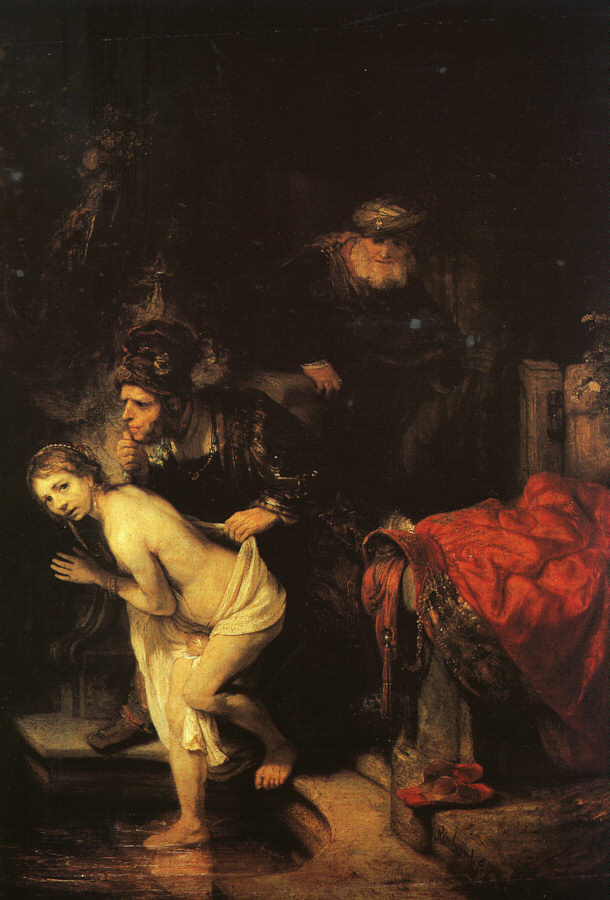
1647

=== Franz Stuck 1904–1913 ===
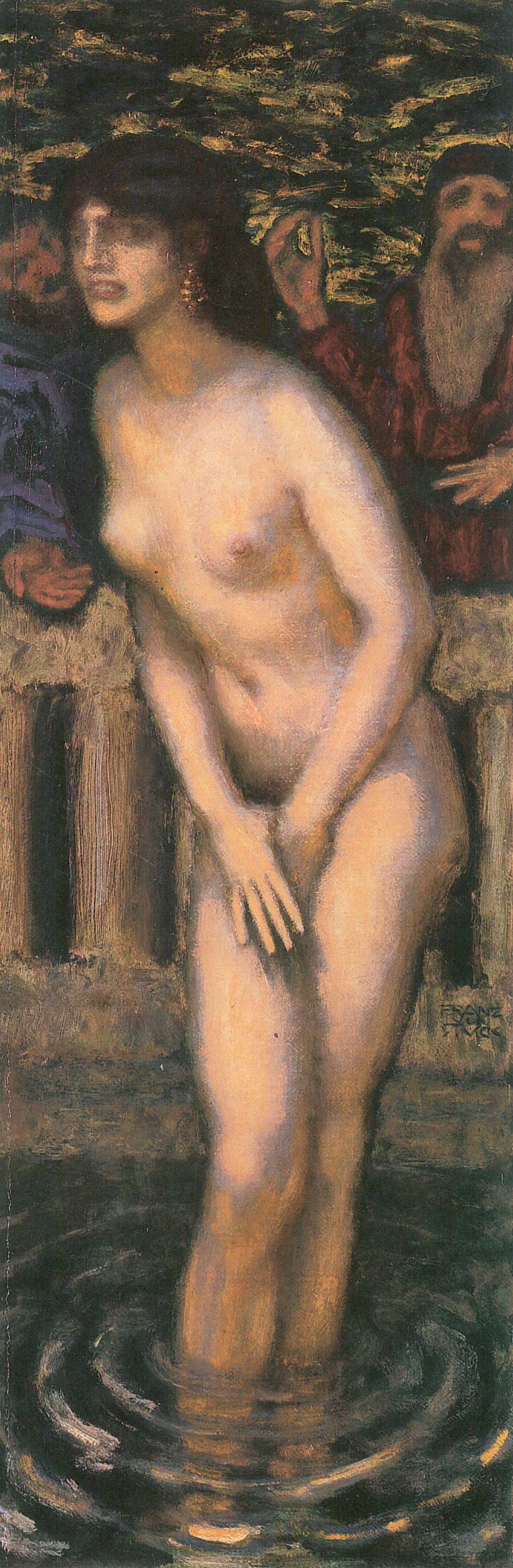
1904

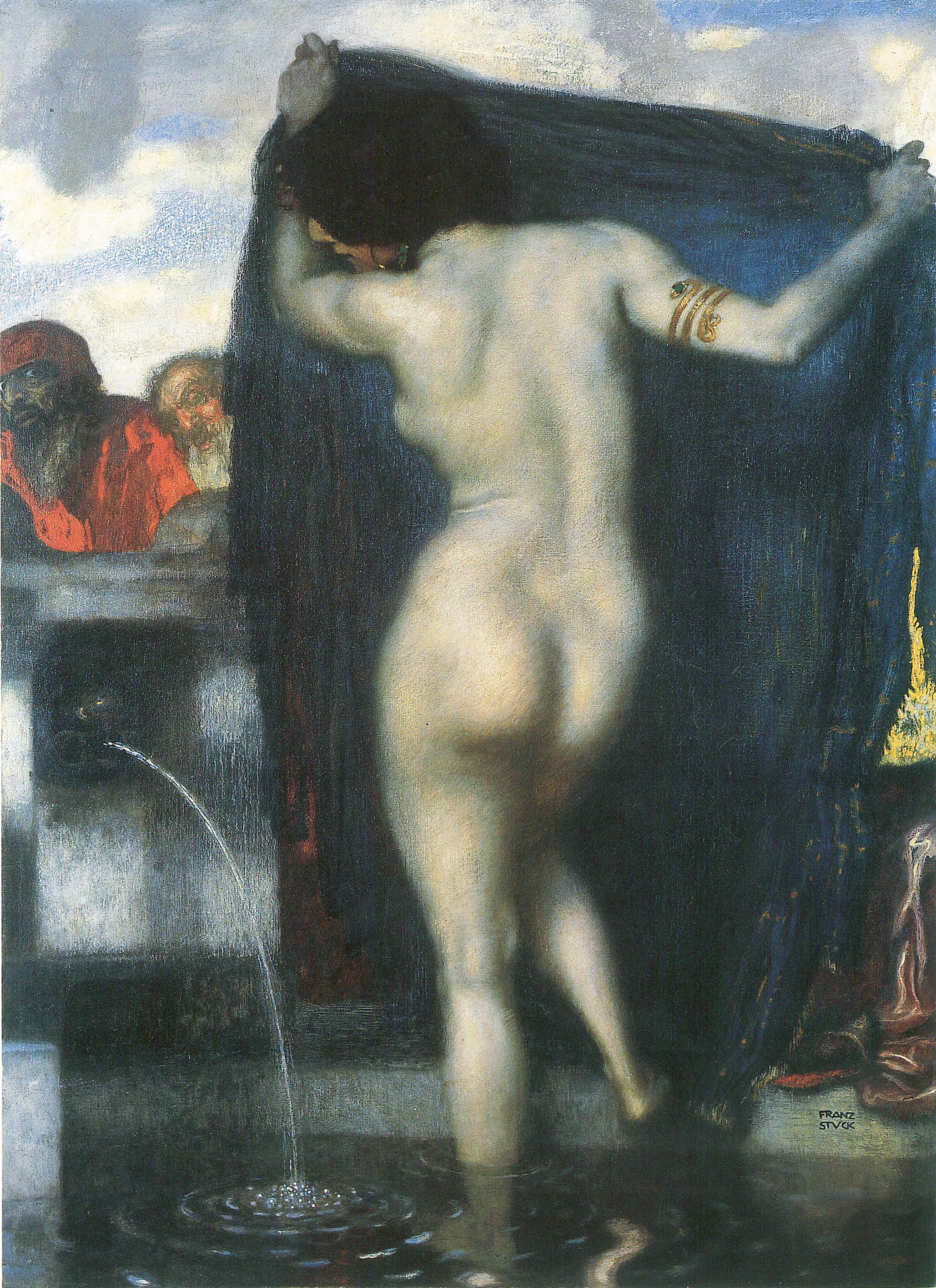
1913

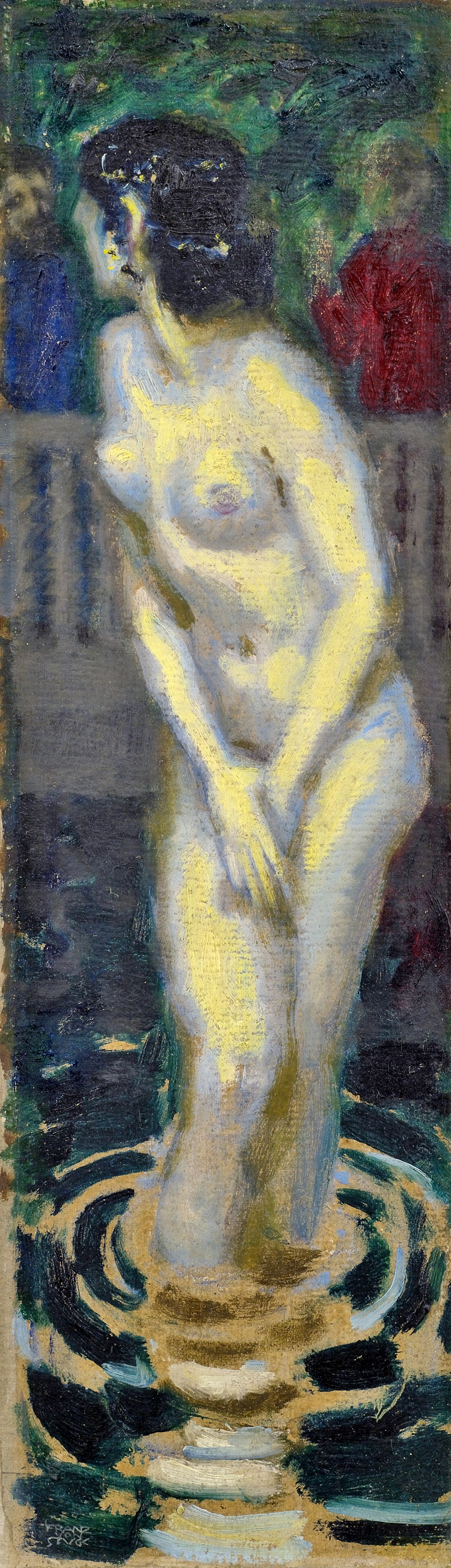
c.1913

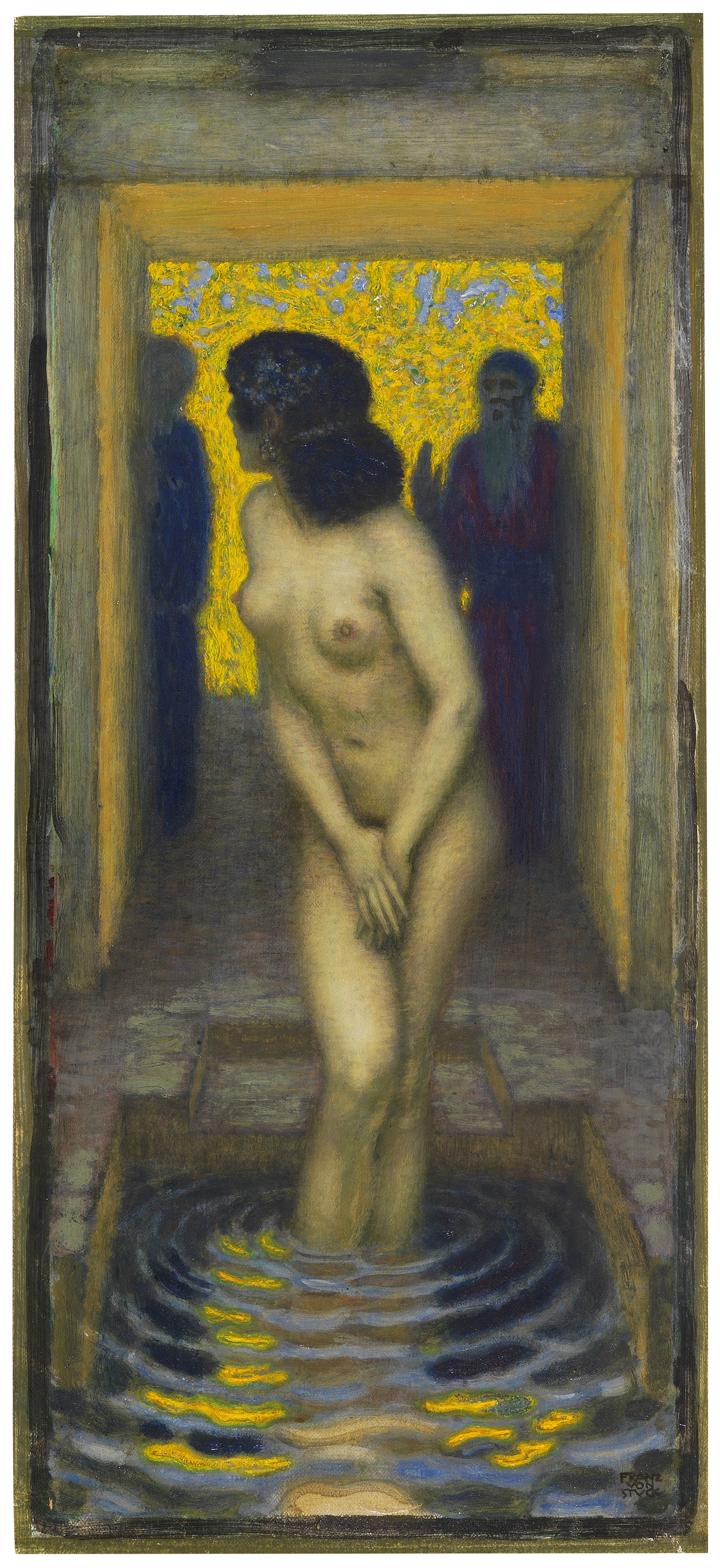
1913

== Male gaze ==
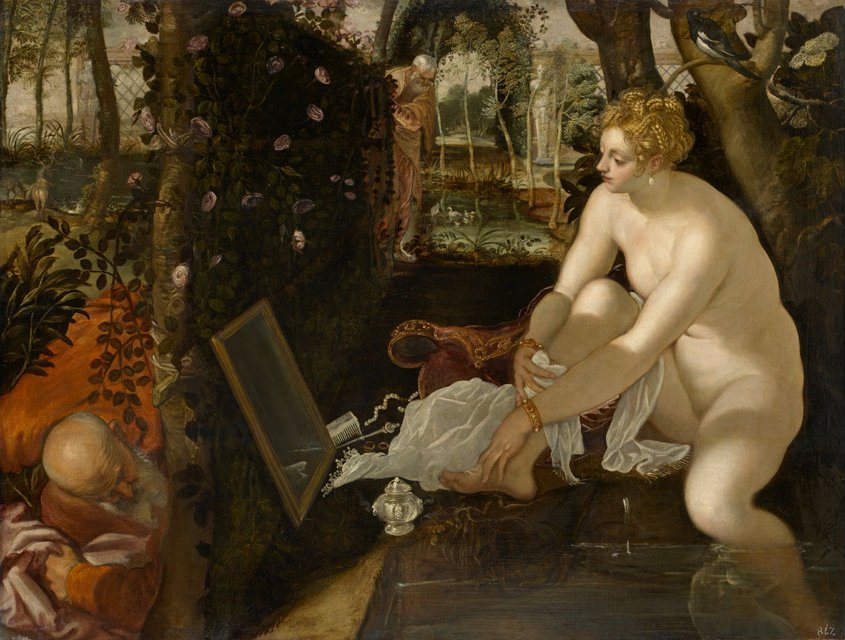
Another of Tintoretto's Susanna and the Elders; "Susannah is looking at herself in the mirror. Thus she joins the spectators of herself", according to Berger.

In the production of art, the conventions of artistic representation connect the objectification of a woman, by the male gaze, to the Lacanian theory of social alienation — the psychological splitting that occurs from seeing one's self as one is, and seeing one's self as an idealized representation. In Italian Renaissance painting, especially in the nude-woman genre, that perceptual split arises from being both the viewer and the viewed, and from seeing one's self through the gaze of other people. Susanna and the Elders, like many biblical or mythological stories of women who for whatever reason were at some point naked, was a frequent subject of paintings of nudes.

In the television series and book Ways of Seeing (1972), the art critic John Berger used portrayals of the scene to address male gaze and the sexual objectification of women in the arts and advertising by emphasizing that men look and women are looked-at as the subjects of images. For the purposes of art-as-spectacle, men act and women are acted-upon according to the social conditions of spectatorship, which are determined by the artistic and aesthetic conventions of objectification, which artists have not transcended.

In the genre of the Renaissance nude, the woman who is the subject of the painting often is aware of being looked at, either by others in the painting or by the spectator who is gazing at the painting in which she is the subject. Berger analyzes two of Tintoretto's paintings of Susanna. In the first, Susanna "looks back at us looking at her". In the second she is looking at herself in a mirror and thus joining the artist, the viewer, and the elders as a spectator of herself. Susanna's lack of distress and even nonchalance at being observed naked in both paintings and others as depicted by male artists has been contrasted to the clear distress shown in the depiction of the same scene by Artemisia Gentileschi, a female artist, whose Susanna shows she is clearly in distress at being watched by the two men.
