= 1646 =

1646 in various calendars
- Gregorian calendar: 1646; MDCXLVI
- Ab urbe condita: 2399
- Armenian calendar: 1095; ԹՎ ՌՂԵ
- Assyrian calendar: 6396
- Balinese saka calendar: 1567–1568
- Bengali calendar: 1052–1053
- Berber calendar: 2596
- English Regnal year: 21 Cha. 1 – 22 Cha. 1
- Buddhist calendar: 2190
- Burmese calendar: 1008
- Byzantine calendar: 7154–7155
- Chinese calendar: 乙酉年 (Wood Rooster); 4343 or 4136 — to — 丙戌年 (Fire Dog); 4344 or 4137
- Coptic calendar: 1362–1363
- Discordian calendar: 2812
- Ethiopian calendar: 1638–1639
- Hebrew calendar: 5406–5407
- Hindu calendars
- Vikram Samvat: 1702–1703
- Shaka Samvat: 1567–1568
- Kali Yuga: 4746–4747
- Holocene calendar: 11646
- Igbo calendar: 646–647
- Iranian calendar: 1024–1025
- Islamic calendar: 1055–1056
- Japanese calendar: Shōhō 3 (正保３年)
- Javanese calendar: 1567–1568
- Julian calendar: Gregorian minus 10 days
- Korean calendar: 3979
- Minguo calendar: 266 before ROC 民前266年
- Nanakshahi calendar: 178
- Thai solar calendar: 2188–2189
- Tibetan calendar: ཤིང་མོ་བྱ་ལོ་ (female Wood-Bird); 1772 or 1391 or 619 — to — མེ་ཕོ་ཁྱི་ལོ་ (male Fire-Dog); 1773 or 1392 or 620

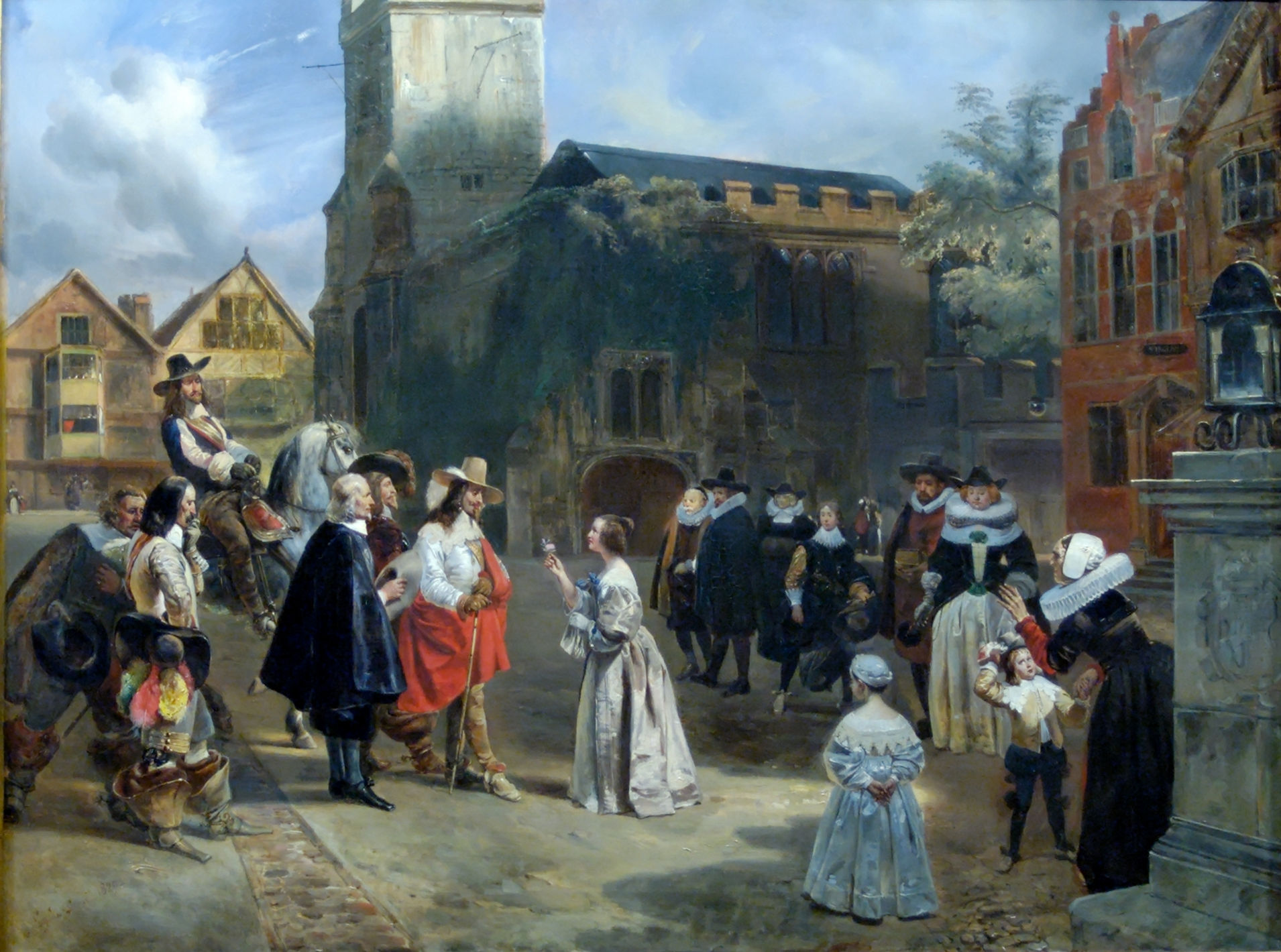
December 23: Charles I Receiving a Rose by Eugène Lami. Deposed King Charles I of England is imprisoned at Carisbrooke Castle after being turned over to the forces of General Oliver Cromwell.

1646 (MDCXLVI) was a common year starting on Monday of the Gregorian calendar and a common year starting on Thursday of the Julian calendar, the 1646th year of the Common Era (CE) and Anno Domini (AD) designations, the 646th year of the 2nd millennium, the 46th year of the 17th century, and the 7th year of the 1640s decade. As of the start of 1646, the Gregorian calendar was 10 days ahead of the Julian calendar, which remained in localized use until 1923.

It is one of eight years (CE) to contain each Roman numeral once (1000(M)+500(D)+100(C)+(-10(X)+50(L))+5(V)+1(I) = 1646).

== Events ==
=== January–March ===
- January 5 – The English House of Commons approves a bill to provide for Ireland to be governed by a single Englishman.
- January 9 – Battle of Bovey Heath in Devonshire: Oliver Cromwell's New Model Army surprises and routs the Royalist camp of Lord Wentworth.
- January 19 – Sir Richard Grenville, 1st Baronet, a Royalist fighting for Prince Charles against Oliver Cromwell's Commonwealth, is imprisoned for insubordination after proposing to make Cornwall self-governing in order to win Cornish support for the Royalists. After being incarcerated at the tidal island of St Michael's Mount off of the coast of Cornwall, he is allowed to escape in March to avoid capture by Cromwell's troops.
- January 20 – Francesco Molin is elected as the 99th Doge of Venice after 23 ballots, and governs the Venetian Republic for nine years until his death in 1655.
- January 21 – Philip Sidney, 3rd Earl of Leicester is approved by England's House of Commons as the Lord Lieutenant of Ireland.
- February 16 – First English Civil War – Battle of Torrington: A decisive Parliamentary victory is gained over the Royalists.
- February 28 – Roger Scott is tried in Massachusetts for sleeping in church.
- March 2 – The future Charles II of England escapes from Cornwall into exile across the English Channel.
- March 6 – Joseph Jenkes obtains the first colonial machine patent, in Massachusetts.
- March 15 – Start of the Battles of La Naval de Manila, a series of five naval battles fought between the Dutch Republic and Spain in the waters of the Philippines.

=== April–June ===
- April 24 – The Union of Uzhorod brings the Ruthenian Greek Orthodox Church into the fold of the Catholic Church while allowing it to retain its Eastern and Rusyn character.
- April 27 – King Charles I of England flees from Oxford (where he has been overwintering) in disguise and begins his journey to the Scottish army camp near Newark.
- May 5 – King Charles I of England surrenders his forces to a Scottish army at Southwell, Nottinghamshire.
- May 6 – American colonial poet Anne Bradstreet becomes a founding mother of Andover Parish (modern-day North Andover), Massachusetts.
- May 30 – Eighty Years' War: Habsburg Spain and the Dutch Republic sign a temporary cease-fire.
- June 20 – Third Siege of Oxford concludes with signing of the surrender of the Royalist garrison at Oxford to General Thomas Fairfax's Parliamentary New Model Army; on the 24th of June the main force marches out, ending the First English Civil War.

=== July–September ===
- July 7 – The populist political movement called the Levellers appears in England with the publication of the Levellers manifesto, A Remonstrance of Many Thousand Citizens by Richard Overton and William Walwyn.
- July 12 – Lightning strikes the gunpowder tower of the castle of Bredevoort in the Netherlands, causing an explosion that destroys parts of the castle and the town, killing Lord Haersolte of Bredevoort and his family, as well as others. Only one son, Anthonie, who is not home that day, survives.
- July 30 – Commissioners of the Parliament of England and Scottish Covenanters meeting in Newcastle upon Tyne set out the Heads of Proposals ("Newcastle Propositions") demanding that King Charles I gives up control of the army and place restrictions on Catholics, as the basis for a constitutional settlement.
- August 19
  - The Westminster Assembly of Divines, meeting in London, approves a resolution to begin the drawing up of the Westminster Confession of Faith, declaring that "These heads of Faith, Repentance, and Good Works shall be referred to the three Committees in their order to prepare something upon them for the Confession of Faith."; the draft is printed and sent to the Parliament of England in December.
  - First English Civil War: Raglan Castle in Wales surrenders to General Fairfax after a 2-month siege; it is later destroyed.
- September 16 – The new Orange College of Breda opens at Breda in the Dutch Republic.

=== October–December ===
- October 10 – France takes Dunkirk from the Spanish Netherlands for the first time.
- October 28 – The first Protestant church assembly for Native Americans (specifically, the Waban people) is held in Massachusetts.
- October 9 – The Anglican episcopacy is formally abolished by an act of England's Parliament.
- November 4 – Massachusetts Bay Colony enacts the death penalty as punishment for denying Biblical inspiration.
- November 16 – Following up on the abolition of the episcopacy, Parliament passes an act to sell the bishops' lands across the Commonwealth.
- December 7 – Countess Louise Henriette of Nassau marries Frederick William, Elector of Brandenburg, on her 19th birthday at The Hague.
- December 23 – The Covenanters hand over King Charles I of England to the Parliamentarians.

== Births ==
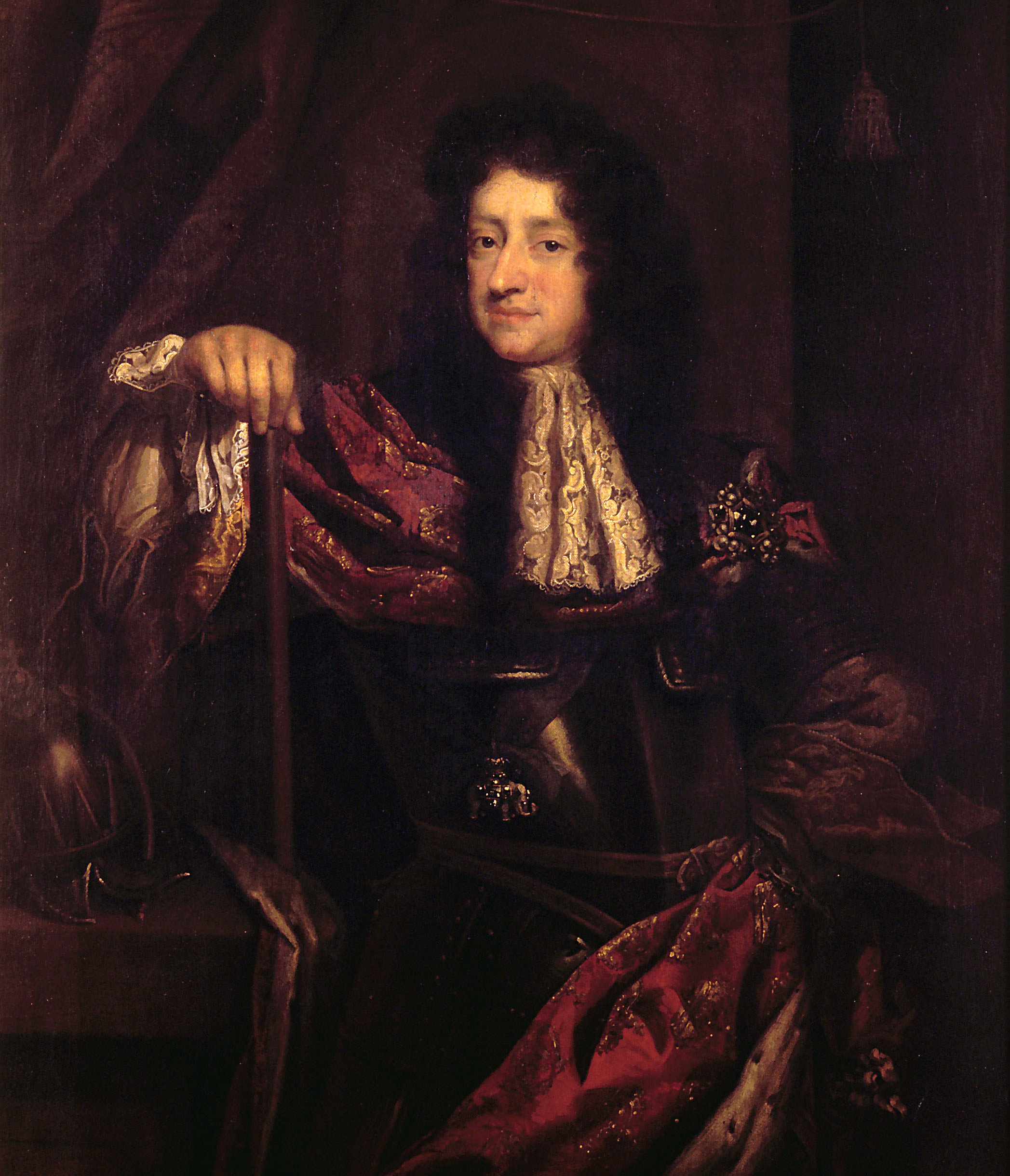
Christian V of Denmark

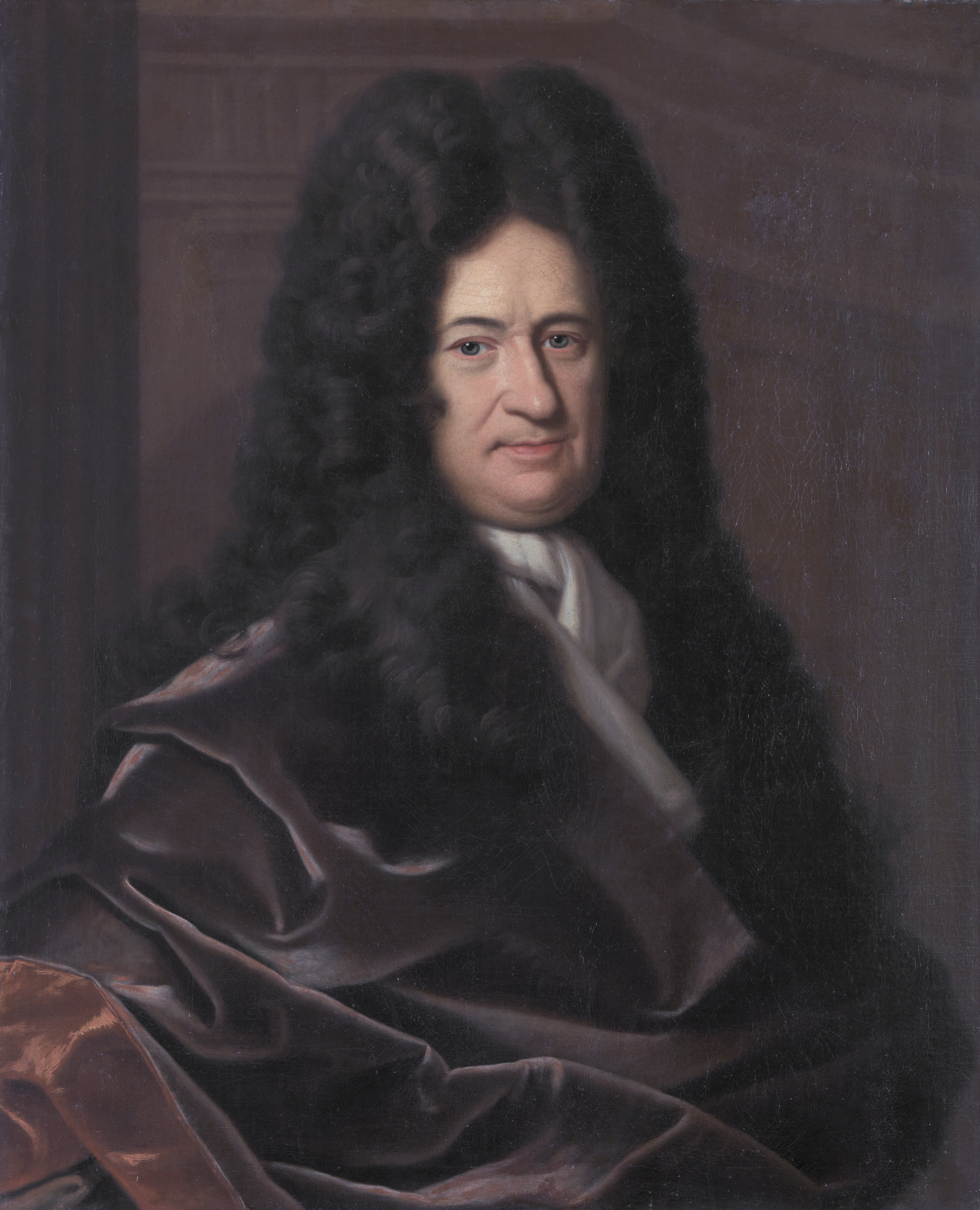
Gottfried Wilhelm Leibniz

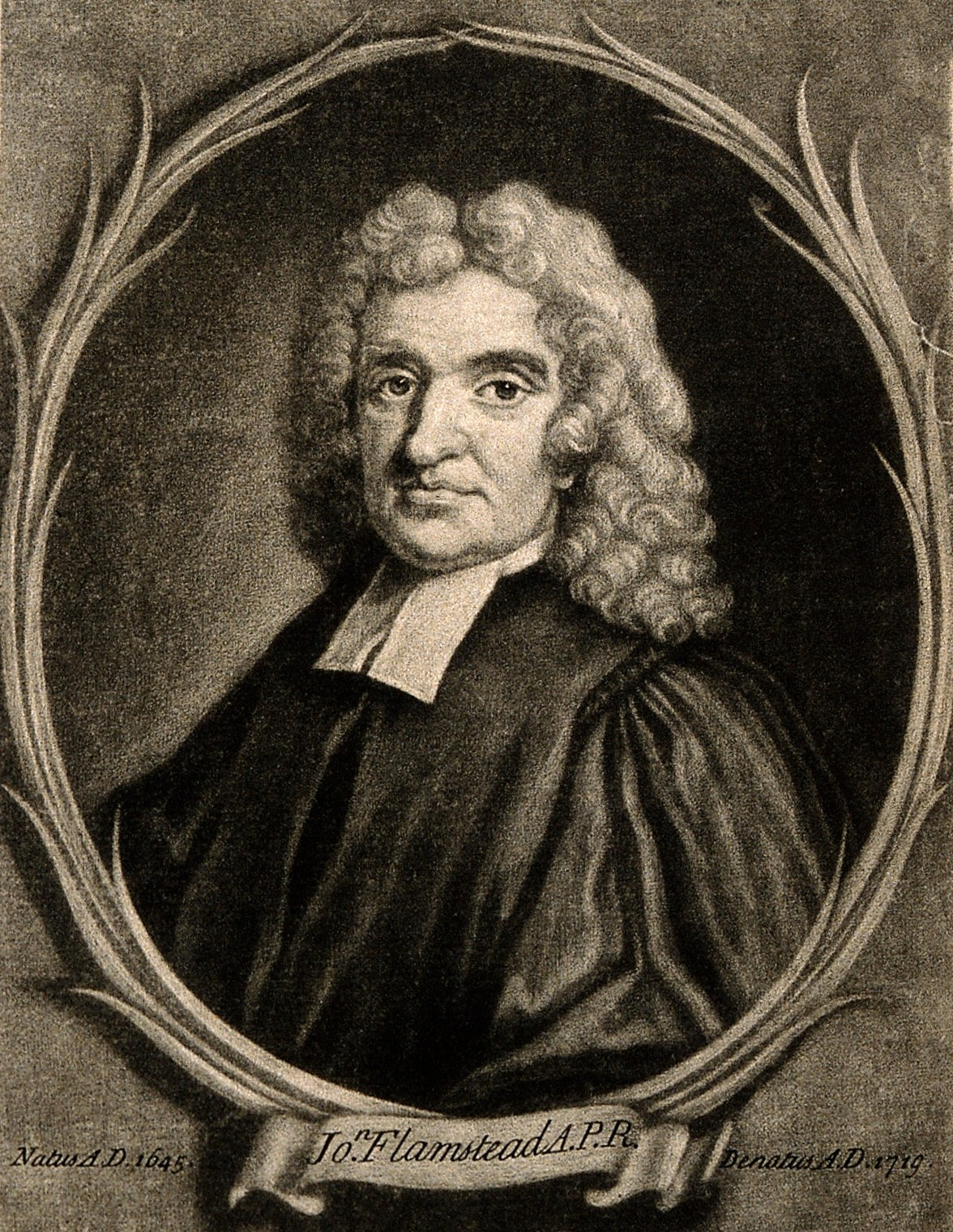
John Flamsteed

=== January–March ===
- January 1 – David Makeléer, Swedish politician (d. 1708)
- January 6 – Jan Van Cleef, Flemish painter (d. 1716)
- February 4 – Hans Erasmus Aßmann, German statesman and poet from the second Silesian school (d. 1699)
- February 10 – Hans Adam Weissenkircher, Austrian painter (d. 1695)
- February 17 – Pierre Le Pesant, sieur de Boisguilbert, French economist (d. 1714)
- February 23 – Tokugawa Tsunayoshi, Japanese shōgun (d. 1709)
- March 19 – Michael Kongehl, German poet and hymnwriter (d. 1710)
- March 25 – Niels Jonsson Stromberg af Clastorp, Swedish noble (d. 1723)

=== April–June ===
- April 1 – Hermann Otto II of Limburg Stirum, German army commander (d. 1704)
- April 4 – Antoine Galland, French orientalist and archaeologist (d. 1715)
- April 6 – Henry Goring, English politician (d. 1685)
- April 12 – Pietro Dandini, Italian painter (d. 1712)
- April 15 – King Christian V of Denmark (d. 1699)
- April 16 – Jules Hardouin-Mansart, French Baroque architect (d. 1708)
- April 20
  - Giacinto Calandrucci, Italian painter (d. 1707)
  - Charles Plumier, French botanist (d. 1704)
- May 12 – George IV, Count of Erbach-Fürstenau (1672–1678) (d. 1678)
- May 29 – Isaac Johannes Lamotius, Dutch Governor of Mauritius (d. 1718)
- June 5 – Elena Cornaro Piscopia, Venetian philosopher of noble descent (d. 1684)
- June 6 – Hortense Mancini, favourite Italian niece of Cardinal Mazarin (d. 1699)
- June 21 – Maria Francisca of Savoy (d. 1683)
- June 30 – Paul Hermann, German botanist (d. 1695)

=== July–September ===
- July 1 – Gottfried Wilhelm Leibniz, German philosopher, scientist, and mathematician (d. 1716)
- July 9 – Zeger Bernhard van Espen, Belgian jurist (d. 1728)
- July 15 – Frederick I, Duke of Saxe-Gotha-Altenburg (1675–1691) (d. 1691)
- July 20
  - François Vaillant de Gueslis, Jesuit missionary (d. 1718)
  - Eusèbe Renaudot, French theologian and orientalist (d. 1720)
- July 24 – Madeleine Boullogne, French painter (d. 1710)
- July 29 – Johann Theile, German composer and organist (d. 1724)
- August 2
  - Jean-Baptiste du Casse, French admiral and buccaneer (d. 1715)
  - John Lauder, Lord Fountainhall, Scottish jurist (d. 1722)
- August 8
  - Godfrey Kneller, German-born painter (d. 1723)
  - Eleonore Charlotte of Saxe-Lauenburg-Franzhagen, Duchess of Schleswig-Holstein-Sonderburg-Franzhagen (d. 1709)
- August 12 – Louise Elisabeth of Courland, Landgrave of Hesse-Homburg (d. 1690)
- August 16 – Juan Francisco de Padilla y San Martín, Spanish Catholic prelate, Bishop of Santa Cruz de la Sierra and Bishop of Puerto Rico (d. 1700)
- August 19 – John Flamsteed, British astronomer (d. 1719)
- August 24 – Roger Boyle, 2nd Earl of Orrery, Member of the Irish House of Commons (d. 1682)
- August 28 – Tsugaru Nobumasa, Japanese daimyō (d. 1710)
- September 16 – Juan Romero de Figueroa, Spanish priest (d. 1720)

=== October–December ===
- October 3 – Joseph Parrocel, French Baroque painter (d. 1704)
- October 7 – Charles Honoré d'Albert, duc de Luynes, French noble (d. 1712)
- October 10 – Françoise-Marguerite de Sévigné, French countess (d. 1705)
- November 8 – Cresheld Draper, English politician (d. 1694)
- November 9 – John Egerton, 3rd Earl of Bridgewater, English politician (d. 1701)
- November 27 – Edward Howard, 2nd Earl of Carlisle, English politician (d. 1692)
- December 4 – Alain Emmanuel de Coëtlogon, Marshal of France in the reign of Louis XIV and Louis XV (d. 1730)
- December 26
  - Robert Bolling, wealthy early American settler, planter and merchant (d. 1709)
  - Élisabeth Marguerite d'Orléans, French noble (d. 1696)

== Deaths ==
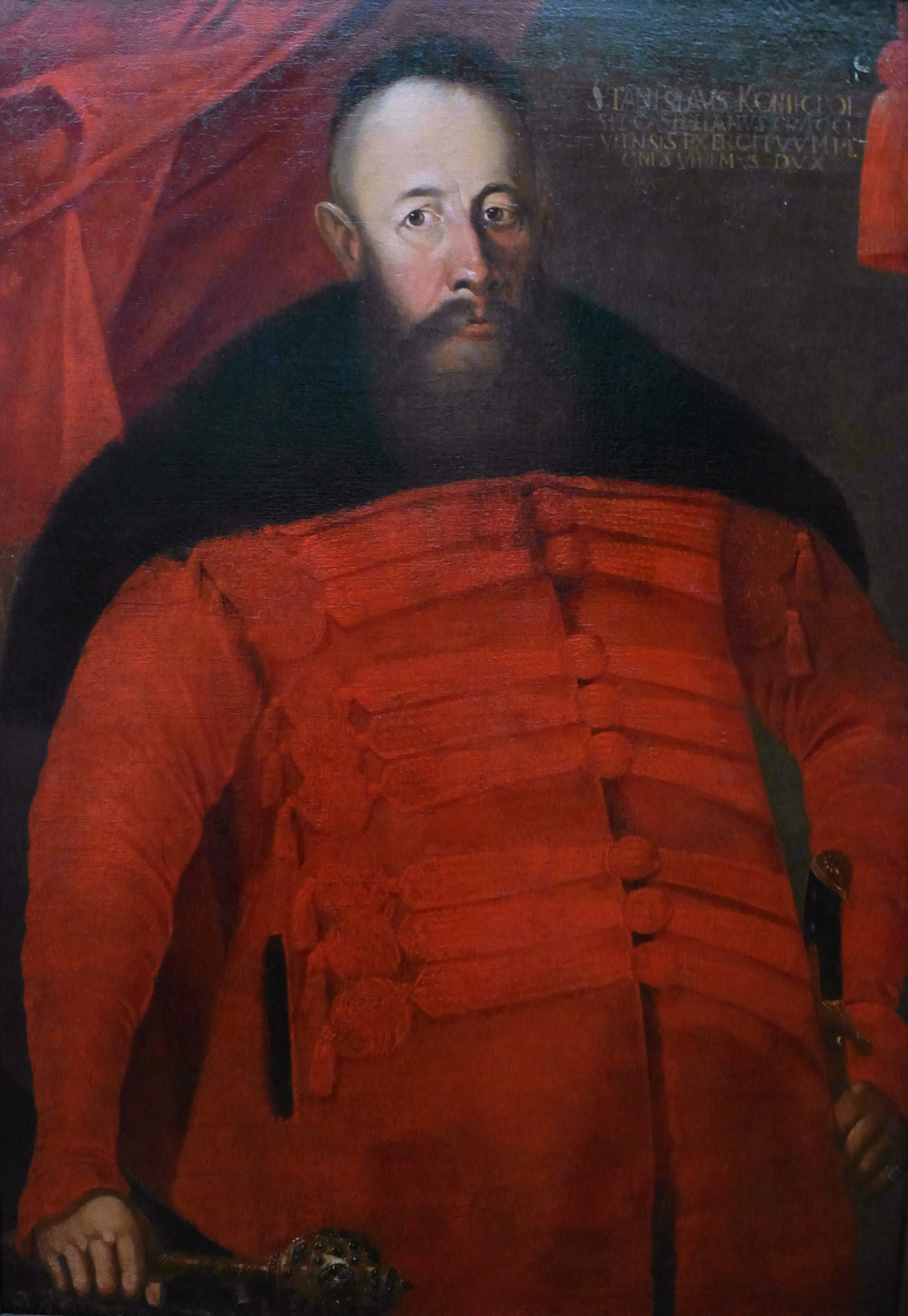
Stanisław Koniecpolski

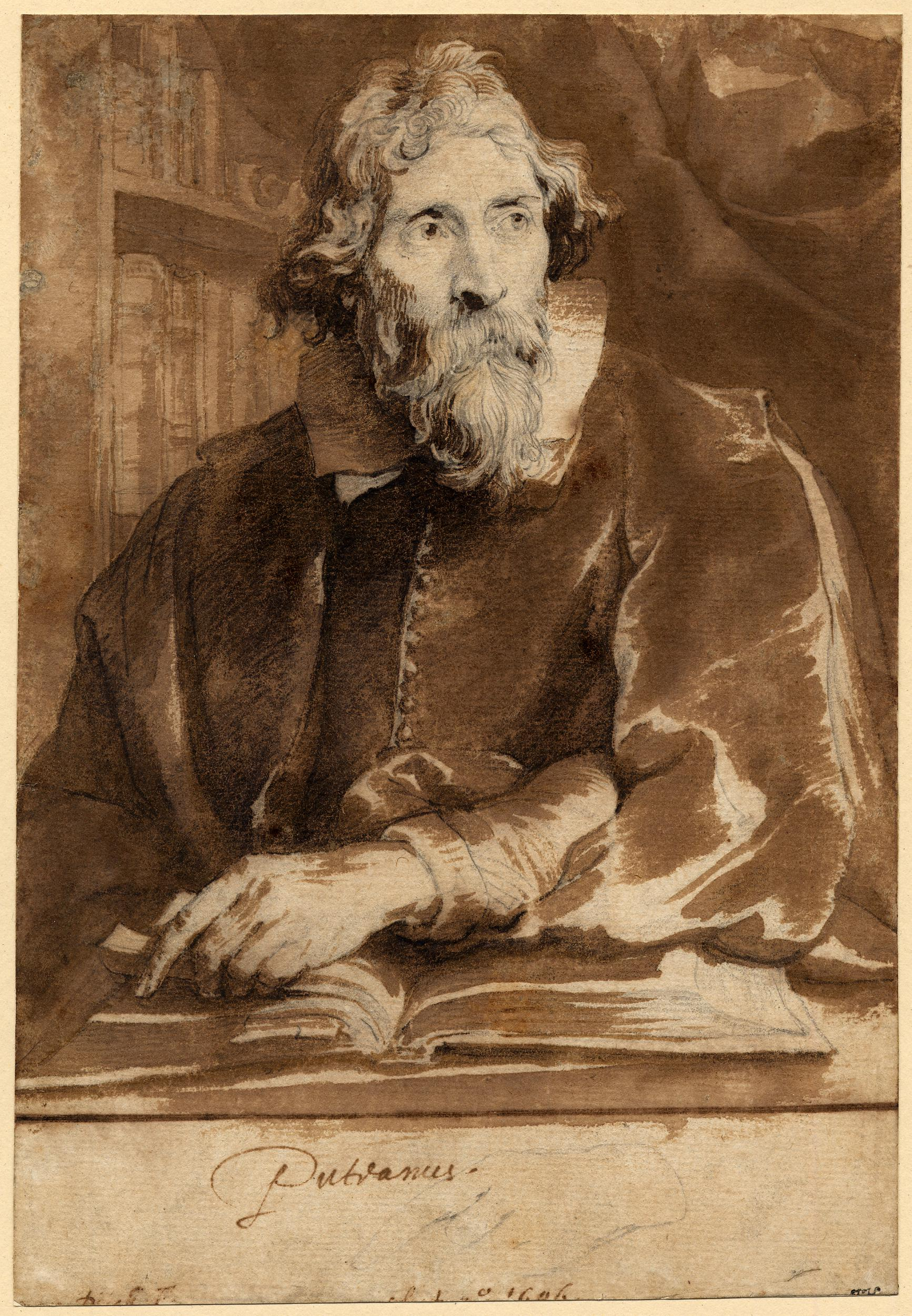
Erycius Puteanus

- January 3 – Francesco Erizzo, Doge of Venice (b. 1566)
- January 4 – Gaspard III de Coligny, Marshal of France (b. 1584)
- January 6 – Elias Holl, German architect (b. 1573)
- January 18 – Hosokawa Tadaoki, Japanese daimyō (b. 1563)
- February 4 – Johannes Polyander, Dutch theologian (b. 1568)
- March 11 – Stanisław Koniecpolski, Polish soldier and statesman (b. c. 1592)
- April 10 – Santino Solari, Swiss architect and sculptor (b. 1576)
- May 13 – Maria Anna of Spain (b. 1606)
- June 14 – Jean Armand de Maillé-Brézé, French admiral (b. 1619)
- June 23 – Jakub Sobieski, Polish noble (b. 1590)
- June 27 – Achille d'Étampes de Valençay, Knight of Malta (b. 1593)
- June 29
  - Laughlin Ó Cellaigh, Gaelic-Irish Lord
  - Jan Reynst, Dutch art collector (b. 1601)
- June 30 – Philip Powell, Welsh martyr (b. 1594)
- July 13 – Roger de Saint-Lary de Termes, French noble (b. 1562)
- July 25 – Maria Caterina Farnese, Duchess of Modena and Reggio (b. 1615)
- August 9 – Margherita Aldobrandini, Parmesan regent (b. 1588)
- August 19 – Alexander Henderson, Scottish theologian (b. c. 1583)
- September 1 – Francis Windebank, English statesman (b. 1582)
- September 9 – Mu Zeng, Chinese politician (b. 1587)
- September 11
  - Antonio Marcello Barberini, Italian cardinal and the younger brother of Maffeo Barberini (b. 1569)
  - Odoardo Farnese, Duke of Parma and Piacenza (b. 1612)
- September 14 – Robert Devereux, 3rd Earl of Essex, English Civil War general (b. 1591)
- September 17 – Erycius Puteanus, Dutch humanist and philologist (b. 1574)
- September 24 – Duarte Lobo, Portuguese composer (b. c. 1565)
- October 3 – Virgilio Mazzocchi, Italian Baroque composer (b. 1597)
- October 4 – Thomas Howard, 21st Earl of Arundel, English statesman (b. 1586)
- October 9 – Balthasar Charles, Prince of Asturias (b. 1629)
- October 12 – François de Bassompierre, Marshal of France (b. 1579)
- October 18 – Isaac Jogues, French Jesuit missionary (b. 1607)
- October 28 – William Dobson, English painter (b. 1610)
- November 4 – Louis Günther I of Schwarzburg-Rudolstadt (b. 1581)
- November 29 – Laurentius Paulinus Gothus, Swedish theologian and astronomer (b. 1565)
- December 22 – Peter Mohyla, Moldavian Orthodox Metropolitan of Kiev and Galicia (b. 1596)
- December 26 – Henri, Prince of Condé (b. 1588)
- December 28 – François Maynard, French poet (b. 1582)
- date unknown – Lady Ann Cunningham, Scottish noble and army leader (b. c. 1580)
