= Waban (disambiguation) =

Waban (c. 1604 – c. 1685) was the first Native American to convert to Christianity in Massachusetts. Waban may also refer to:

- Waban, Massachusetts, a village of Newton, Massachusetts
- Waban (MBTA station), a transit station in the Waban section of Newton, Massachusetts
- USS Waban (1880), a United States Navy steamer in commission from 1898 to 1919
- SS Waban, a Design 1015 ship built for the United States Shipping Board in 1919
- Lake Waban, a lake overlooked by Wellesley College in Massachusetts
