= Battle of the Alma =

1854 battle of the Crimean War

- Part of the Crimean War
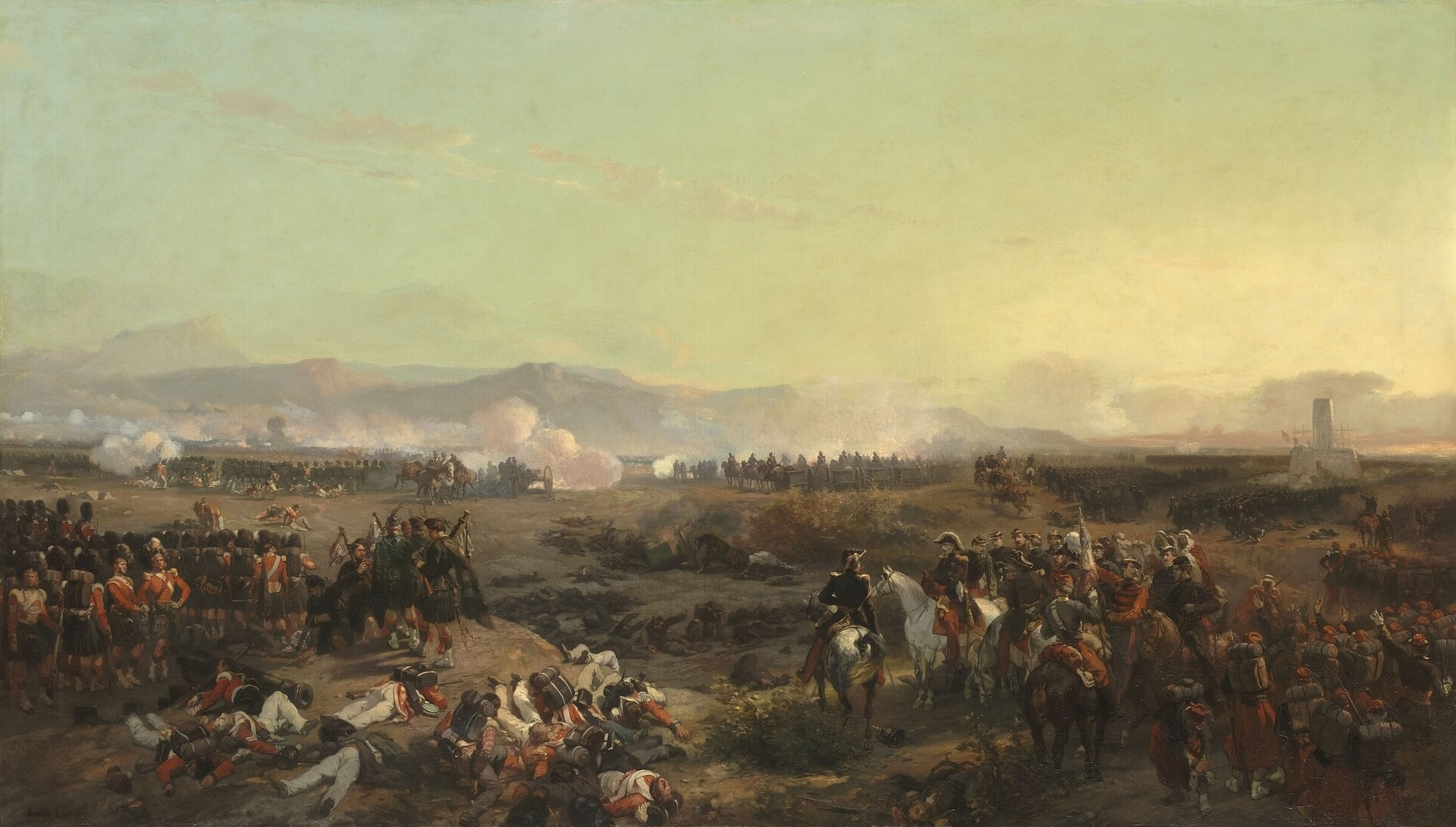
- The Battle of the Alma; Eugene Lami, 1855
Date	20 September 1854
Location	Alma River, Russian Empire 44.831036°N 33.668879°E
Result	Allied victory

Belligerents
(United Kingdom of Great Britain and Ireland) United Kingdom (Second French Empire) France; Ottoman Empire	(Russian Empire) Russia

Commanders and leaders
Lord Raglan; Jacques Arnaud (Ottoman Empire) Suleiman Pasha	Alexander Menshikov

Strength
56,500–58,000 (Note: British: 27,000 men; French: 25,000; Turkish: 6,000 men.)	37,500

Casualties and losses
4,103 killed and wounded	~5,700 killed and wounded

The Battle of the Alma (short for Battle of the Alma River) took place during the Crimean War between an allied expeditionary force (made up of French, British, and Ottoman forces) and Russian forces defending the Crimean Peninsula on 20 September 1854. The allies had made a surprise landing in Crimea on 14 September. The allied commanders, Maréchal Jacques Leroy de Saint-Arnaud and Lord Raglan, then marched toward the strategically important port city of Sevastopol, 45 km (28 miles) away. Russian commander Prince Alexander Sergeyevich Menshikov rushed his available forces to the last natural defensive position before the city, the Alma Heights, south of the Alma River.

The allies made a series of disjointed attacks. The French turned the Russian left flank with an attack up cliffs that the Russians had considered unscalable. The British initially waited to see the outcome of the French attack, then twice unsuccessfully assaulted the Russians' main position on their right. Eventually, superior British rifle fire forced the Russians to retreat. With both flanks turned, the Russian position collapsed and they fled. The lack of cavalry meant that little pursuit occurred.

The battle cost the French roughly 1,600 casualties, the British 2,000, the Ottomans 503, and the Russians some 5,000.

== Background ==
The allied fleet of 400 ships left the Ottoman port of Varna on 7 September 1854 with no clear objective or specified landing point. The allies had been planning to capture Sevastopol in a coup de main, but decided instead to sail to Evpatoria, which a landing party captured on 13 September. Prince Alexander Sergeyevich Menshikov, commander of Russian forces in the Crimea, was taken by surprise. He had not thought the allies would attack so close to the onset of winter, and had failed to mobilize sufficient troops to defend Crimea. He had only 38,000 soldiers and 18,000 sailors along the southwestern coast, and 12,000 more around Kerch and Theodosia.

Allied forces reached Kalamita Bay on the western coast of the Crimea, 45 km (28 miles) north of Sevastopol, and started disembarking on 14 September. The French disembarked first, and by nightfall, Général François Canrobert's 1st Division, Général Pierre François Bosquet's 2nd Division and Prince Napoleon's 3rd Division were ashore with their artillery. The British landing took much longer to complete compared to the French, as the infantry was landed first, when the sea was calm, but by the time the British tried to get their cavalry ashore, the wind was up and the horses struggled in the heavy surf.

The Ottoman forces sent to Alma consisted of the 3rd Brigade commanded by Major General (Amirliwa) Suleiman Pasha Al Arnauti, the 3rd Brigade was made up of the 13th Infantry Regiment (commanded by Brigadier Mustafa Bek) and 14th Infantry Regiment (commanded by Brigadier Ali Bek)

The British troops and cavalry took five days to disembark. Many of the men were sick with cholera and had to be carried off the boats. No facilities for moving equipment overland existed, so parties had to be sent out to steal carts and wagons from the local Tatar farms. The only food or water for the men was the three days' rations they had been given at Varna. No tents or kitbags were offloaded from the ships, so the soldiers spent their first nights without shelter, unprotected from the heavy rain or the blistering heat.

The British force comprised 26,000 infantry: the 1st Infantry Division under the Duke of Cambridge; the 2nd Infantry Division under Sir George de Lacy Evans; the 3rd Infantry Division under Sir Richard England; the 4th Infantry Division under Sir George Cathcart; and the Light Division under Sir George Brown. The British also had a 1,000-strong Cavalry Division under Lord Lucan); four batteries of Royal Artillery; and one troop of Royal Horse Artillery).

Despite the plans for a surprise attack on Sevastopol being undermined by the delays, six days later on 19 September, the army finally started to head south, with its fleets supporting them. The French were on the right of the allied line near the shore, with the Turks following them, and the British were on the left further inland. The march involved crossing five rivers: the Bulganak, the Alma, Kacha, Belbek, and Chernaya. (Note: See the map on top of page XXVII in Orlando Figes, The Crimean War: A History) By midday, the allied army reached the Bulganak and had its first sight of the Russians when a Cossack vanguard opened fire on the 13th Light Dragoons' scouting party. As the Light Brigade prepared to charge the Cossacks, Lord Raglan sent an order for it to retreat when a large Russian infantry force was discovered in a dip in the terrain ahead. The next morning, the allied army marched down the valley to engage the Russians, whose forces were on the other side of the river, on the Alma heights.

At the Alma, Prince Menshikov, commander-in-chief of Russian forces in the Crimea, decided to make his stand on the high ground south of the river. Although the Russian Army was numerically inferior to the combined Franco-British force (35,000 Russian troops as opposed to 60,000 Anglo-French-Ottoman troops), the heights they occupied were a natural defensive position, indeed, the last natural barrier to the allied armies on their approach to Sevastopol. Furthermore, the Russians had more than one hundred field guns on the heights they could employ with devastating effect from the elevated position; however, none were on the cliffs facing the sea, which were considered too steep for the enemy to climb.

The allies bivouacked on the northern bank of the Bulganak, next day marching the 6 km (4 miles) to the north bank of the Alma, where the ground sloped gently down to the river. (Note: See the map on the bottom of page XXVII of Orlando Figes, The Crimean War: A History) The precipitous cliffs running along the southern bank of the river were 107 m (350 ft) high and continued inland from the river's mouth for almost two mi (3 km), where they met a less steep, but equally high hill known as Telegraph Hill across the river from the village of Bourliouk. (Note: See the map on the bottom of page XXVII of Orlando Figes, The Crimean War: A History) To its east lay Kourgane Hill, a natural strongpoint with fields of fire covering most approaches, and the key to the whole position. Two redoubts had been constructed to protect Kourgane Hill from infantry assault; the lesser redoubt on the eastern slope and the greater redoubt on the west. The road to Sevastopol ran between Telegraph and Kourgane Hills, covered by Russian batteries located on the hills and in the narrow valley between them. (Note: See the map on the bottom of page XXVII of Orlando Figes, The Crimean War: A History)

== Battle ==
=== The French attack on the Russian left flank ===
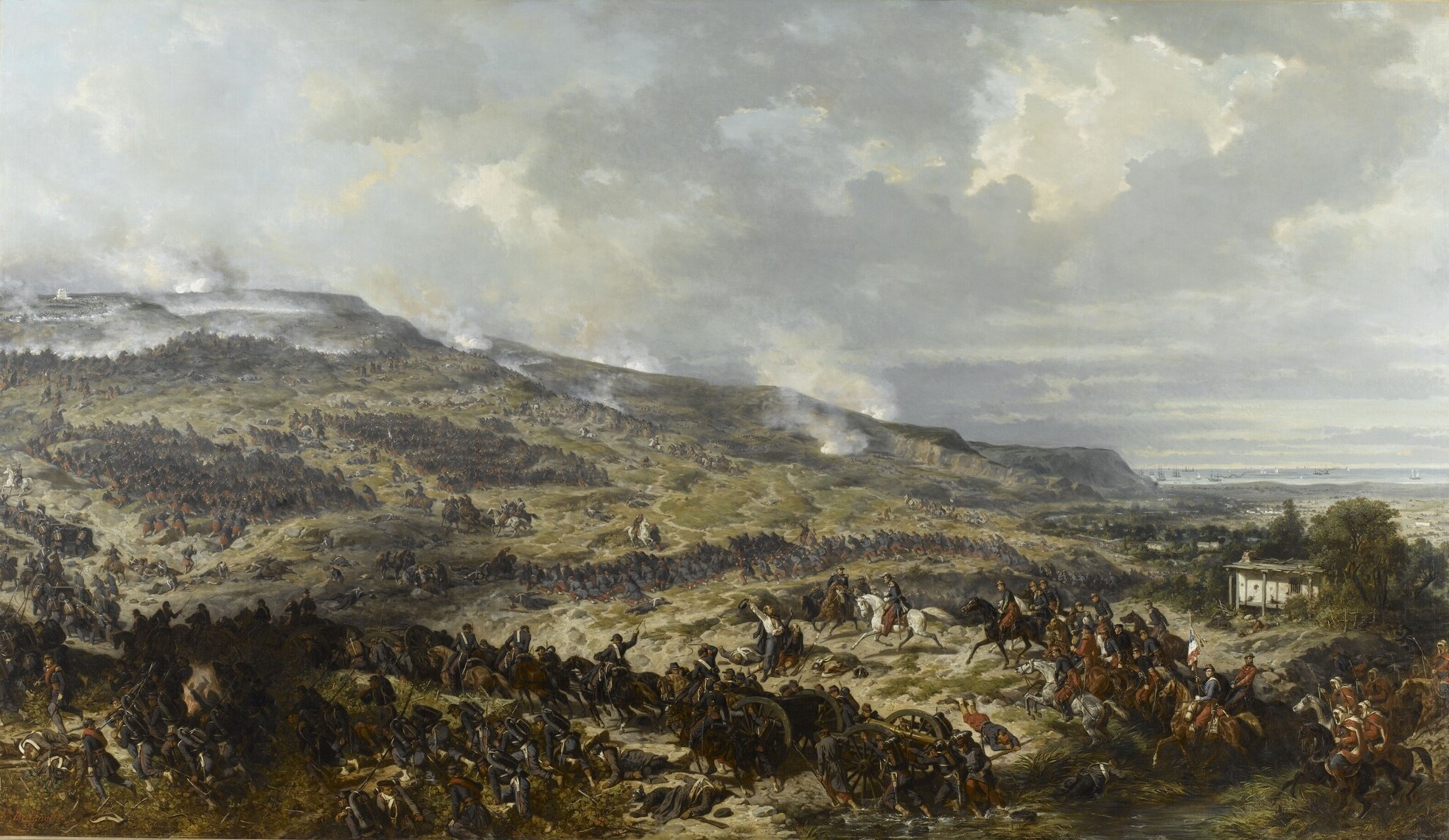
French troops at the Battle of the Alma

By mid-morning, the allied army was assembling on the plain, the British on the left of the Sevastopol Road, the French and the Turks on the right, stretching out towards the coast. According to the plan that the allies had agreed upon the day before, the two armies were to advance simultaneously on a broad front and try to turn the enemy's flank on the left further inland. At the final moment, Raglan decided to delay the British advance until the French had broken through on the right; the troops were ordered to lie on the ground, within range of the Russian guns, in a position from which they could scramble to the river when the time was right. They lay there from 13:15 to 14:45, losing men as the Russian gunners found their range.

While the British were holding their advance, on the far right, Bosquet's 2nd Division arrived at the river's mouth and encountered steep cliffs rising 50 m above the river. The Russians considered the cliffs so steep that they deemed it unnecessary to defend the position with artillery. Leaving their kitbags on the riverbank, the Zouaves at the division's head started to swim across the river and rapidly climbed the cliffs using the trees to scale it. Once they had reached the plateau, they hid behind rocks and bushes to engage the defending forces of the Moscow Regiment and held the position until reinforcements could arrive. Following the Zouaves, more soldiers scaled the cliffs and carried 12 guns up a ravine. They arrived just in time to meet the extra infantry and artillery that Menshikov had transferred from the center in an attempt to organize the resistance and prevent the Russian Army from being outflanked on its left.

The Russian situation became hopeless. Before a counterattack could be made, the whole of Bosquet's division and many of the Turks had reached the plateau. The Russians had more guns – 28 to the French 12 – , but the French guns were of larger caliber and longer range, and Bosquet's riflemen kept the Russian gunners at a distance where only the heavier French guns could take effect. The guns of the allied fleet also started pounding the Russian positions on the cliffs, undermining the morale of their troops. By the time the first Russian battery of artillery arrived, it found the remnants of the Moscow Regiment already in retreat. Under heavy fire from the Zouaves, the Minsk Regiment also began to retreat.

=== Attack at the greater redoubt ===
In the meantime on Bousquet's left, Canrobert's 1st Division and to Canrobert's left Prince Napoleon's 3rd Division were unable to cross the river in the face of heavy fire coming from Telegraph Hill, and their advance stalled. Prince Napoleon sent word to Lieutenant-General George de Lacy Evans, 2nd Division's commander on his left, calling on the British to advance and take some pressure off the French. Raglan was still waiting for the French attack to succeed before committing British troops, and at first told Evans not to take orders from the French, but under pressure from Evans, he relented. At 14:45, he commanded the British Light, 1st and 2nd Divisions to advance, although without further orders. The British army was arrayed in two lines; the first consisted of the Light Division on the left led by Sir George Brown and Lacy Evans' 2nd Division on the right. Behind them was a second line - the 1st Division under Duke of Cambridge, consisting of the Highland and the Guards Brigades, which were deployed to support the first line's advance. The remaining British troops were held in reserve.

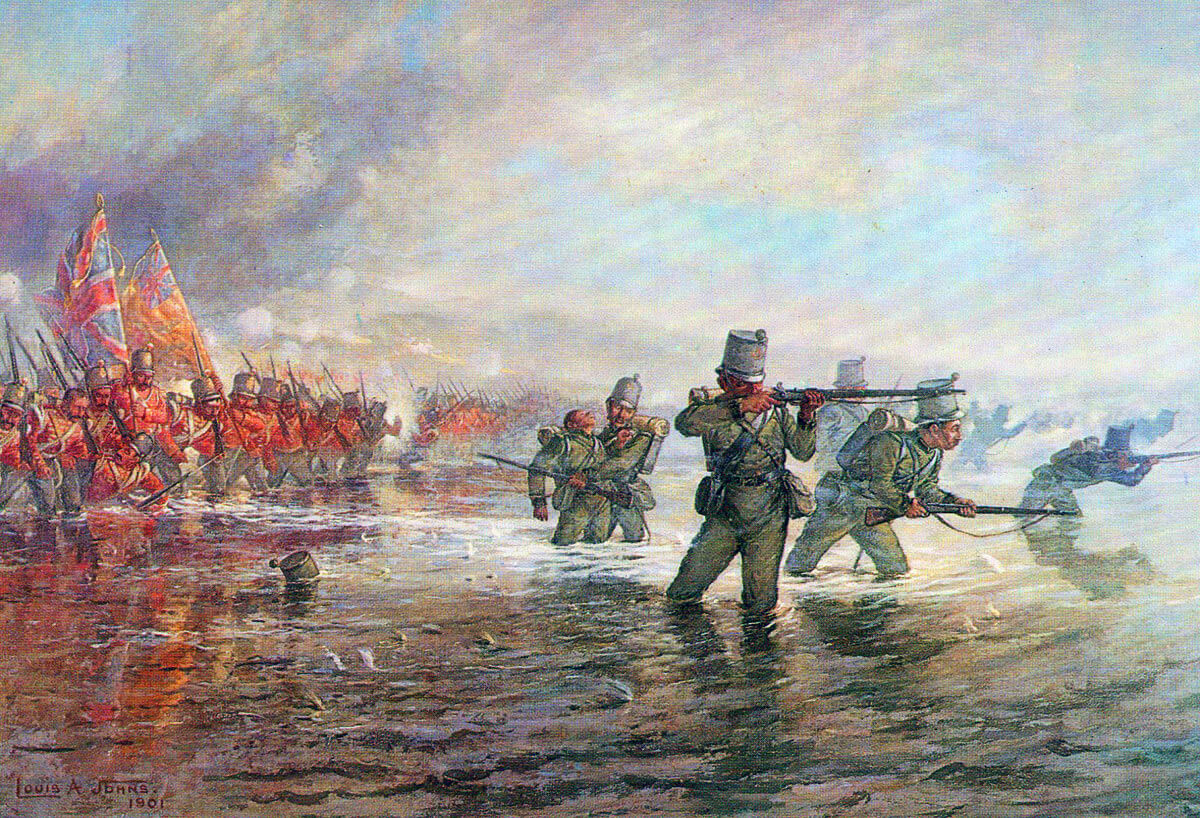
2nd Rifle Brigade at the Battle of Alma

The Light Division had not extended itself far enough left and advanced at an angle. Soon, the troops on the right of the Light Division and the left of the 2nd Division began merging. The strategic formation of the British line was lost. Once they had crossed the river, all order was also lost. Companies and regiments became jumbled together, and where the lines had been two men deep, now just a crowd resulted. The Russians, seeing this, began to advance down the hill from either side of the great redoubt, firing on the British below. Mounted British officers galloped round their men, urging them to reform their lines, but were unsuccessful in persuading them to move from the shelter of the riverbank. Some sat down and took out their water cans; others began to eat. Aware of the danger of the situation and unable to reorganize, Major-general William John Codrington, commander of the Light Division's 1st Brigade, ordered his troops to fix bayonets and advance.

The densely packed Codrington's Brigade started to advance uphill in a thick crowd. Without time and unable to put the soldiers in formation, the officers gave up and urged them to charge toward the Russian guns in the redoubt. As Russian artillery opened fire, the British continued scrambling upward until some of the Light Division's advanced guard tumbled over the walls of the greater redoubt. As the Russians were trying to redeploy their cannons, soldiers clambered over the parapets and through the embrasures, capturing two guns in the confusion. However, realizing their lack of reinforcements, and as the Vladimirsky Regiment poured into the redoubt from the open higher ground, British buglers sounded the withdraw order. Russian infantry charged with fixed bayonets, driving out the British and firing at them as they retreated down the hill.

=== Retreat and second attack ===
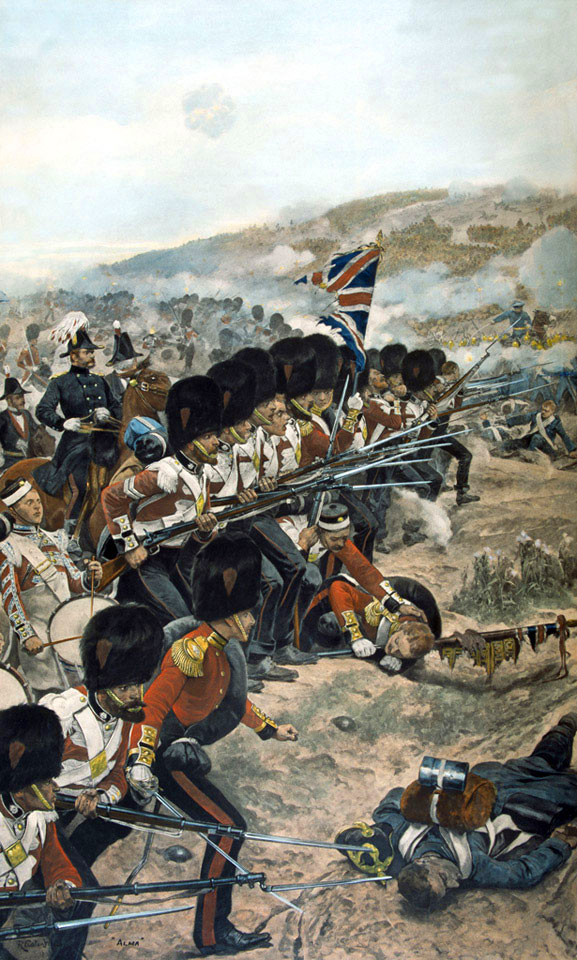
The Coldstream Guards at the Alma, by Richard Caton Woodville 1896

By now, the 1st Division had finally crossed the river and the Russians in the greater redoubt saw approaching them the Guards' Brigade, with the Grenadier Guards on the right, the Scots Fusilier Guards in the centre, and the Coldstream Guards on the left. Out of sight on the far left was the Highland Brigade, commanded by Sir Colin Campbell. Campbell was irritated by the Guards' delay and ordered an immediate advance. A firm believer in the charge with bayonets, Campbell told his men not to fire their rifles until they were "within a yard of the Russians".

The Scots Fusiliers, by then ahead of the rest of the division, started to move uphill immediately, repeating the Light Division's mistake, which at that moment was running down from the redoubt, pursued by Russian infantry. The Light Division crashed into the advancing Scots Fusiliers with such force that the line was broken in many places. The Scots faltered, but emerged on the other side with only half their numbers and continued towards the great redoubt in a chaotic state. When they were 37 m (40 yd) from the redoubt, the Russians mounted a massive volley. The Scots Fusiliers were forced to retreat, stopping only when they reached the river; they remained in the riverbank shelter for the rest of the battle, ignoring repeated orders to advance.

The two other guards regiments filled the gap left by the Scots Fusiliers, but refused orders to charge with bayonets up the hill. Instead, the Grenadiers and the Coldstream formed into lines and started firing Minié volleys into the Russian advance parties. This stopped the Russians, and the Grenadiers and the Coldstream were soon able to close the gap between them; the Russians were again forced back into the redoubt.

=== Final stage ===
Without entrenchments to protect its infantry and artillery, the Russian Army was unable to defend its position on the heights against the deadly Minié rifles. Soon, the fire of the Guards was joined by the 2nd Division under Evans, on the British right. Its 30th Regiment of Foot could clearly see the gunners of three Russian batteries from the riverbank and take them out with their Minié rifles before they could redeploy the guns. As the Russian infantry and artillery withdrew, the British slowly advanced uphill. By 16:00, the allies were converging on the Russian positions from all directions, with the Guards on the left overcoming the last Russian reserves on the Kurgan Hill, Codrington's men and the other Guards closing in on the great redoubt, and the 2nd Division pushing up the Sevastopol Road. With the French in command of the cliffs above the Alma, the battle clearly had been decided.

The Russians fled in all directions, running down into the valley and away from the enemy. Mounted officers tried in vain to stop the panicked flight, but the men had decided they had had enough. Most of the Russian soldiers retreated towards the Kacha River in small groups, without officers or any clear idea of what to do or where to go. Many were not reunited with their regiments for several days. At the top of Telegraph Hill, the French captured the abandoned carriage of Menshikov. In it they found a field kitchen, letters from the Tsar, 50,000 francs, pornographic French novels, the general's boots, and some ladies' underwear. On the hill were abandoned picnics, parasols and field glasses, left behind by the spectators from Sevastopol.

== Aftermath ==
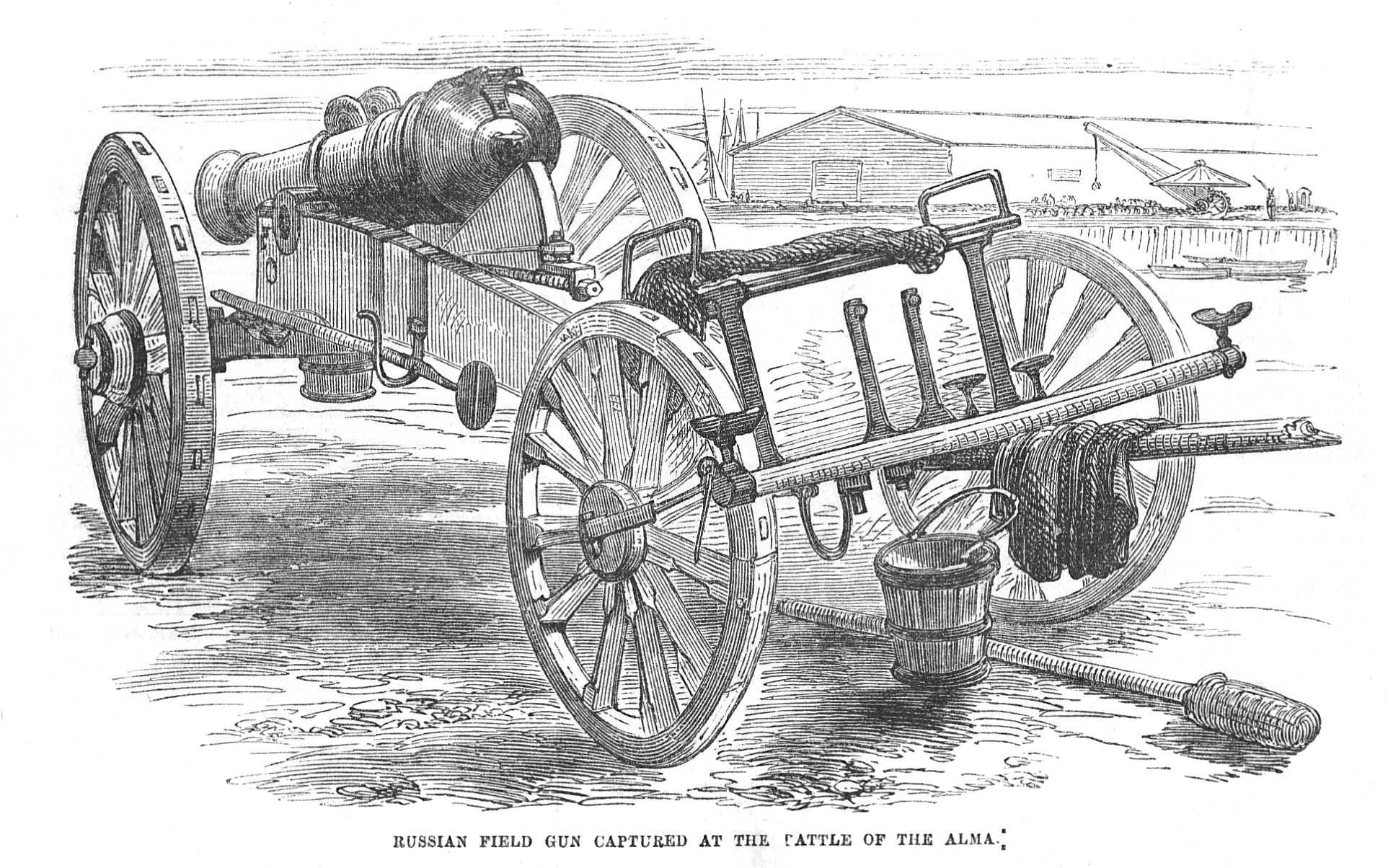
Engraving of a piece of Russian artillery captured by British forces following the conclusion of the battle probably from a contemporary newspaper

The battle cost the French 1,600 casualties, the British 2,000, the Ottomans 503, and the Russians some 5,000. The British took two days to clear the battlefield of their wounded. Without any medical supplies, they had to requisition the commissariat carts to remove the wounded from the battlefield. As the Russian army had to abandon its wounded on the battlefield, many of the injured limped back to Sevastopol over the course of the next days. Some 1600 wounded had to wait several days before they could sail to the Scutari hospital in Constantinople. The allied commanders had no idea of the heavy losses on the Russian side. The necessity of collecting equipment scattered through the battlefield delayed the pursuit, and the lack of cavalry ruled out any possibility of an immediate chase of the Russians.

The French commemorated the battle with the naming of the Pont de l'Alma in Paris, this bridge would become infamous in 1997 as the site of Diana’s car crash that would kill her . The British gave the name Alma to a small settlement in North Otago and to a river in Marlborough, both in New Zealand. In North America, the parish of Alma was created surrounding the village of Alma, New Brunswick in 1856, commemorating the then-recent Battle of Alma. The communities of Alma, Michigan; Alma, Nova Scotia; Alma, Ontario; Alma, Quebec; and Alma, Wisconsin, are named after the battle.

Many British pubs are named "Alma" after the battle.
