= The Battle of the Alma (painting) =

Painting by Eugène Lami

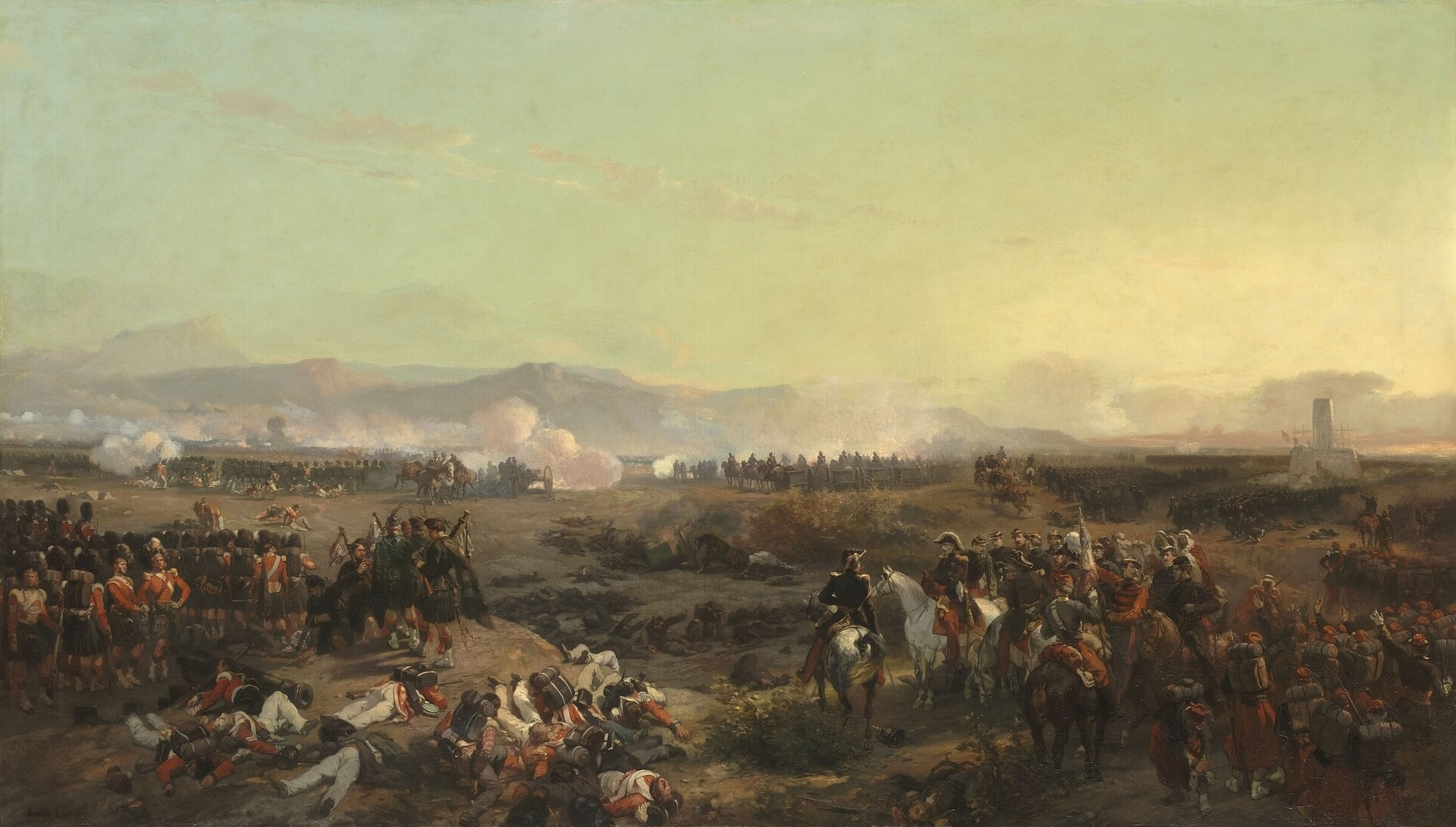
- Artist: Eugène Lami
- Year: 1855
- Medium: Oil on canvas
- Dimensions: 130 cm × 227.5 cm (51 in × 89.6 in)
- Location: Palace of Versailles, Versailles

The Battle of the Alma (French: La bataille de l'Alma) is an oil painting on canvas by the French artist Eugène Lami, from 1855.

== History and description ==
It depicts a battle scene from the Crimean War. The Battle of the Alma was fought on 20 September 1854 when an Allied force of British, French and Ottoman troops advancing on Sevastopol defeated a Russian attempt to block them at the River Alma. The French commander Marshal Saint-Arnaud can be seen with his staff. Highland Soldiers of the British Army are on the left of the painting with Zouaves of the French Army on the right. The work was produced while the war was still being fought and was considered the only unambiguous French victory during the campaign so far which meant the regime of Napoleon III placed great emphasis on it. Other prominent French artists Horace Vernet and Hippolyte Bellangé also received commissions to paint the battle.

The painting featured at the Salon of 1855, held that year as part of the Exposition Universelle and was acquired by the French government for five thousand francs. It is now in the collection of the Palace of Versailles, having previously been at the Musée du Luxembourg and the Louvre.

== Bibliography ==
- Lemoisne, Paul-André. Eugène Lami: 1800–1890, Volume 1. Manzi, Joyant et Cie, 1912.
- Thoma, Julia. The Final Spectacle: Military Painting under the Second Empire, 1855–1867. Walter de Gruyter, 2019.
- Reff, Theodore. World's Fair of 1855. Routledge, 2019.
