= Pine Ridge Road–Plainfield Street Historic District =

Historic district in Massachusetts, United States

- U.S. National Register of Historic Places
- U.S. Historic district
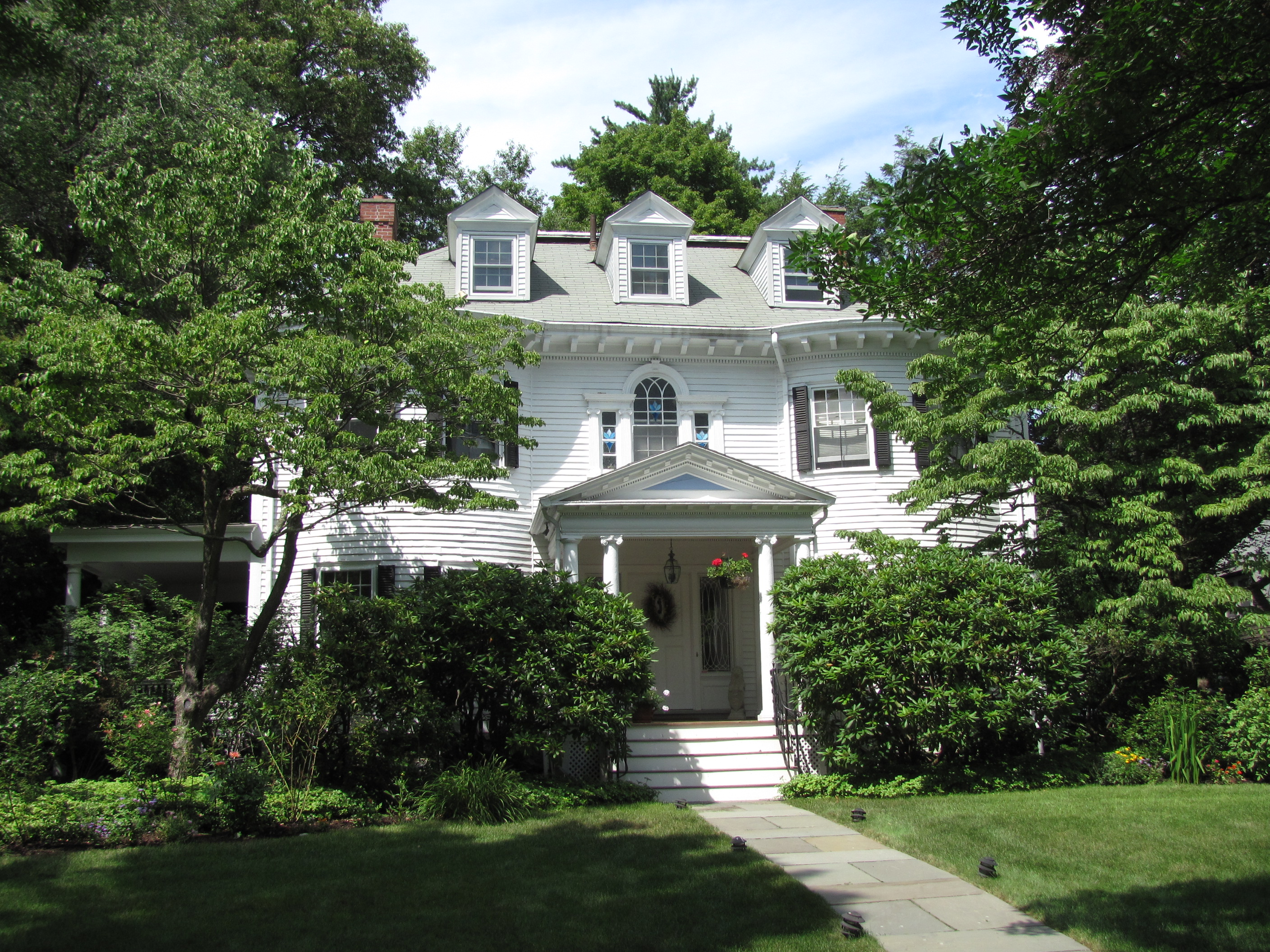
- House on Plainfield Street

- Location within Massachusetts Location within the United States
- Location: Roughly Pine Ridge Rd., Upland Rd., Plainfield St., and Chestnut St., Newton, Massachusetts
- Coordinates: 42°19′38″N 71°13′29″W
- Architect: Multiple
- Architectural style: Late 19th And 20th Century Revivals, Bungalow/Craftsman, Late Victorian
- MPS: Newton MRA
- NRHP reference No.: 90000015
- Added to NRHP: February 16, 1990

The Pine Ridge Road–Plainfield Street Historic District encompasses a residential subdivision in the Waban section of Newton, Massachusetts. It includes 44 properties on Pine Ridge Road and Plainfield Street between Chestnut Street and Upland Road, and includes a few properties on the latter two streets. The area was laid out for development in the 1880s after the arrival of suburban rail service, and was built out by the 1930s. The district was listed on the National Register of Historic Places in 1990.

== Description and history ==
Pine Ridge Road and Plainfield Street are residential streets located to the east of the central village of the Waban neighborhood of Newton. This area was farmland until 1886, when it was purchased by developers Charles Page and Frederick Henshaw. Early development in tnne in style. One of the finer examples is the Stetson House at 91 Pine Ridge Road, while 69 Pine Ridge Road sports a massive half-round porch in the style. Also built in 1897 is the Shingle style Davidson House at 24 Plainfield Street, while the Thomas James House (80 Pine Ridge), also in the Shingle style, may have been designed by its architect-owner. The George Heald house (99 Pine Ridge) is an example of English Tudor Revival architecture, with Tudor arch motifs, half-timbered gables and extensive use of diamond leadlight windows with heraldry symbols. The 1931 Colonial Revival house at 100 Pine Ridge is another architect-designed house, this one by Harry Ramsay, a prolific local designer.

== See also ==
- National Register of Historic Places listings in Newton, Massachusetts
