= Staples-Crafts-Wiswall Farm =

- Staples-Craft-Wiswall Farm
- U.S. National Register of Historic Places
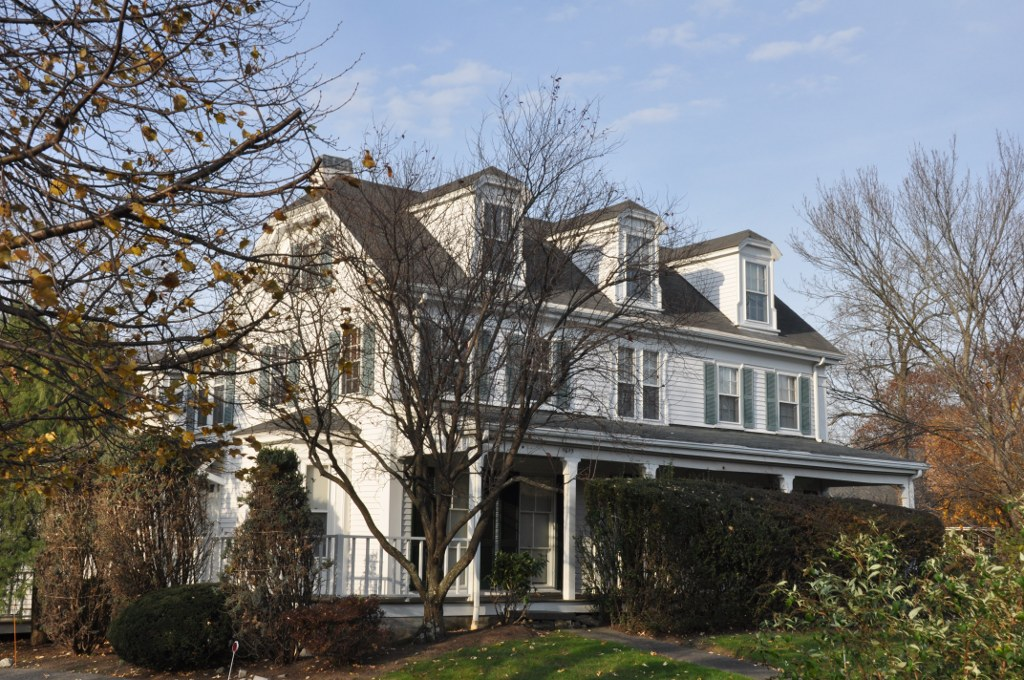

- Location within Massachusetts Location within the United States
- Location: 1615 Beacon St., Newton, Massachusetts
- Coordinates: 42°19′38″N 71°13′49″W
- Built: 1688
- Architectural style: Late Victorian, Georgian, Federal
- MPS: Newton MRA
- NRHP reference No.: 86001884
- Added to NRHP: September 04, 1986

The Deacon John Staples House (also known as the Staples-Crafts-Wiswall Farm) is a historic house at 1615 Beacon Street in the village of Waban in Newton, Massachusetts.

The first house on the site was built in 1688 by Deacon John Staples, a weaver and Newton's first schoolmaster. Staples and his wife had no children of their own, but raised several boys including Moses Craft, a relative of Mrs. Staples. When the Deacon died, Craft inherited the property. Craft rebuilt the house on the original foundation around 1750, constructing a colonial farmhouse two and a half stories high with five windows and two rooms across, and one room wide, with two chimneys running up the back, each serving two rooms. In 1768, he built an addition, adding a kitchen where the original Staples' house kitchen had been. Craft died in 1821 at the age of 85, leaving no will and an estate seriously in debt. As ordered by the judge of probate, the house and surrounding land was sold at auction. Moses' son, Moses Craft II, won with the winning bid of $5.50. In 1824, Moses Craft II sold the property to his cousin William Wiswall. It is believed that Wiswall was responsible for remodeling the house to give it a Federal ornament. David Kinmonth, a Boston merchant, bought the house in 1858 and remodeled it, giving Victorian overtones to its basic Georgian style. The house was remodeled again during the American Civil War. Ownership of the house changed hands many times during the 20th century. It was last sold in 2017 to a non-profit community music school, the Suzuki School of Newton and Suzuki Preschool, and continues to be an icon in the heart of Waban Village. The house was added to the National Register of Historic Places in 1986 as the Staples-Craft-Wiswall Farm and in 2015 was designated a City of Newton Local Landmark. Despite the many modifications that it has undergone, the house stands today on the original 1688 stone foundation, which is up to one meter thick in some places.

== See also ==
- Thomas Wiswall
- National Register of Historic Places listings in Newton, Massachusetts
