= Charles I Receiving a Rose =

Painting by Eugène Lami

Sujet tiré de la vie de Charles Ier
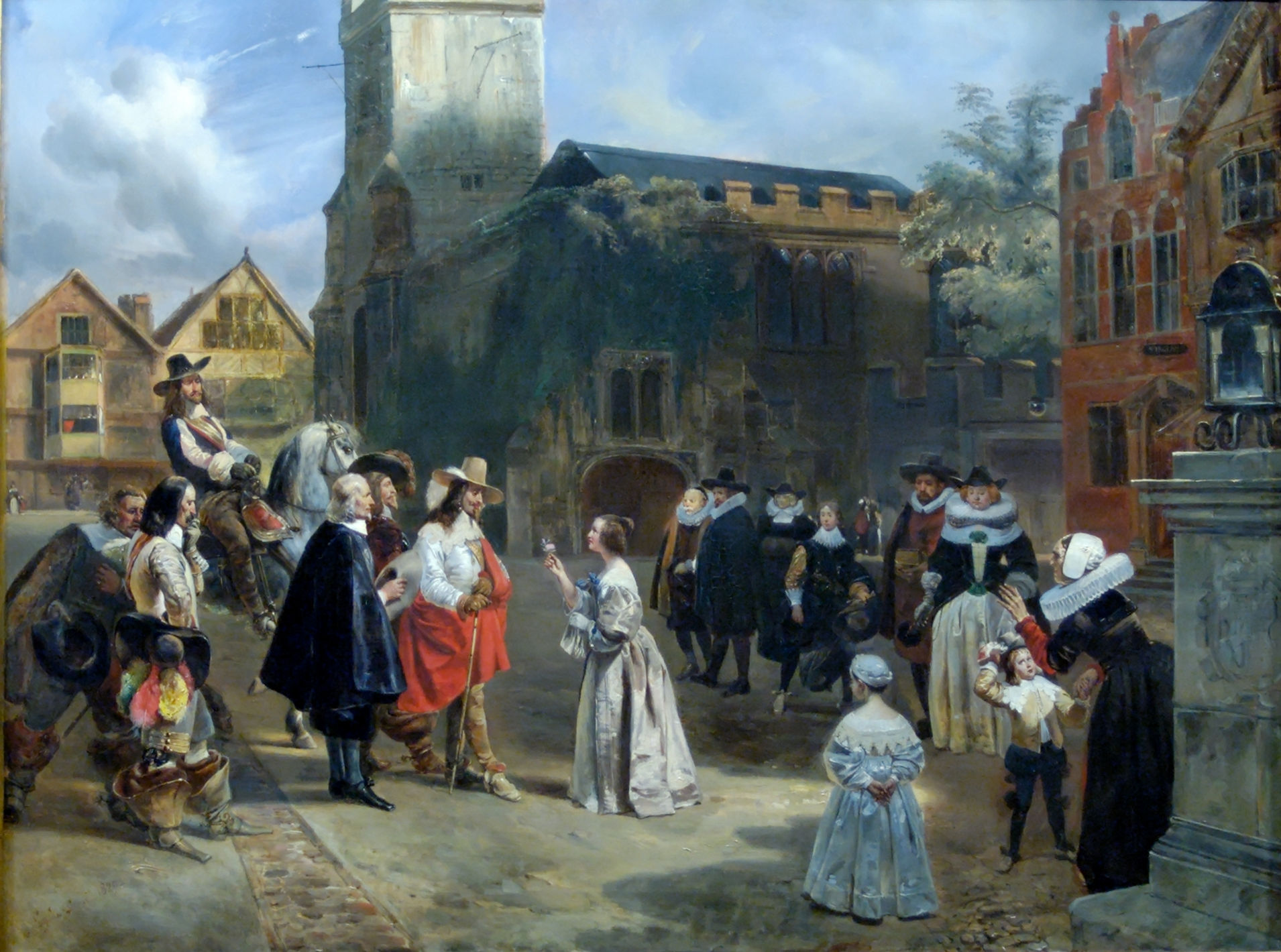
- Artist: Eugène Lami
- Year: 1829
- Type: Oil on canvas, history painting
- Dimensions: 89 cm × 115 cm (35 in × 45 in)
- Location: Louvre; Paris

Charles I Receiving a Rose (French: Charles Ier recevant une ros), originally exhibited under the title Subject taken from the life of Charles I (Sujet tiré de la vie de Charles Ier), is an oil on canvas history painting by the French artist Eugène Lami, from 1829.

== History and description ==
It portrays a scene from seventeenth century British history. It depicts Charles I being presented with a rose by a young female well-wisher as he is taken to be imprisoned at Carisbrooke Castle following his defeat during the English Civil War. The king would subsequently be tried for high treason and then executed in London in January 1649.

Lami was a romantic painter. The current painting was exhibited at the Salon of 1831 at the Louvre, in Paris, the first to be held following the July Revolution of the previous year. Today the work is in the collection of the Louvre, having been acquired in 1831 by the new monarch, Louis Philippe I.

== Bibliography ==
- Arnold, John H. History. Sterling Publishing Company, 2009.
- Lemoisne, Paul-André. Eugène Lami: 1800-1890, Volume 1. Manzi, Joyant et Cie, 1912.
- Noon, Patrick & Bann, Stephen. Constable to Delacroix: British Art and the French Romantics. Tate, 2003.
