= USS Waban =

Tugboat of the United States Navy

History

United States
- Name: USS Waban
- Namesake: Waban (1604–ca. 1685), the first Native American converted to Christianity in Massachusetts
- Builder: William Cramp & Sons, Philadelphia, Pennsylvania
- Completed: 1880
- Acquired: 25 June 1898
- Commissioned: 25 July 1898
- Stricken: 17 July 1919
- Fate: Sold 1919
- Notes: In commercial service as SS Constance 1880–1898 and as SS Waban 1919–1924

General characteristics
- Type: Steamer
- Displacement: 150 tons
- Length: 85 ft 0 in (25.91 m)
- Beam: 17 ft 6.5 in (5.347 m)
- Draft: 8 ft 0 in (2.44 m)
- Propulsion: Steam
- Speed: 13 knots
- Complement: 13
- Armament: 1 × 3-inch (76.2-millimeter) breech-loading gun

USS Waban was a steamer in commission in the United States Navy from 1898 to 1919.

Waban was built as the iron-hulled, stern-wheel steamer Confidence, completed in 1880 at Philadelphia by William Cramp & Sons. She was acquired by the U.S. Navy on 25 June 1898 from M. Revel for use during the Spanish–American War. Renamed USS Waban, the ship was commissioned on 25 July 1898 and assigned to the 6th Naval District.

Waban served with the Auxiliary Naval Force and was based at the 6th Naval District headquarters at Port Royal, South Carolina, during the brief Spanish–American War, which ended on 13 August 1898. She was subsequently stationed at Naval Station Guantanamo Bay at Guantanamo Bay, Cuba, and remained in Cuban waters through 1901. She then shifted to Pensacola, Florida.

Transferred once more to Caribbean waters, Waban departed Pensacola on 17 October 1911, bound for Cuba, and arrived at Guantanamo Bay on 31 October 1911. She remained there performing local tug and towing duties with the fleet through World War I, in which the United States participated from 6 April 1917 to 11 November 1918.

Subsequently, decommissioned, Waban was struck from the Navy List on 17 July 1919 and sold to Whiteman Brothers, of New Orleans, Louisiana. She became SS Waban in mercantile service and operated, first at New Orleans and later at Port Arthur, Texas, until 1924.
