= Michael Kongehl =

German baroque poet

Michael Kongehl (19 March 1646 – 1 November 1710) was a German baroque poet.

== Life ==
Kongehl was born in Kreuzburg (now Slavskoye, Bagrationovsky District) to the brewer Michael Kongehl and his wife Barbara Marquart. He visited the school in Kreuzburg and Königsberg and started to study Lutheran divinity at the University of Königsberg in 1661. Afterwards Kongehl travelled to Jena and Nürnberg, where he lived for 3 years. Here Kongehl was "crowned" as a poet and named "prutenio" and was a member of the association of poets Pegnesischer Blumenorden. He returned to Königsberg and applied for the succession of Simon Dach as a professor of poetry at the University of Königsberg, but without success. Kongehl worked as a municipal secretary of Kneiphof, became a councilman in 1696 and Mayor of Kneiphof. He died throughout a time of epidemic plague in Königsberg.

== Works ==
Kongehl wrote several popular religious chants like

- So bist du nun zugegen, du Heiland aller Welt
- So bleibt denoch ein gut Gewissen das schönste kleinod der Welt
- Nur frisch hinein, es wird so tief nicht sein

but also secular poetry and dramas

- Trauer-Hirten-Spiel, 1674
- Der beglückwünschte Doppelsieg des Kaisers, 1675
- Die vom Himmel herabgestürmte Himmel-Stürmer, 1675
- Das vom ungerathenen Sausewind versuchte u. verfluchte Kriegs-Leben, 1675
- Das bedrückte u. wieder erquickte Brandenburg, 1675
- Das sterbende Leben, 1676
- Surbosia oder geschichtsmächtiges Helden-Gedicht, 1676
- Hirtengedicht Auff Das Anmuthseelige u. Freudenvolle Geburts-Fest Des Allergetreuesten Erz-Seelen-Hirten Jesu Christi, 1680
- Der unschuldig-beschuldigten Innocenzien Unschuld, e. nachdenkl. Genues. Gedicht in e. Mischspiel, 1680
- Die Vom Tod erweckte Phönizia, Eine Anmuthige Sicilian. Geschicht, In e. Misch-Spiel (Tragico-Comoedia), 1682
- Belustigung bei der Unlust aus allerhand Geist- u. andern Glückwunschs-Gedichten. J. - Der Verkehrte u. Wiederbekehrte Prinz Tugendhold, 1691
- Immergrünender Cypressen-Hayn, 1694
- Lust-Quartier, neben den Cypressen-Hayn, 1694
- Die unvergleichlich-schöne Princeßin Andromeda, In e. Misch-Spiel (Tragico-Comedia), 1695
- Sieg prangender Lorbeer-Hayn, 1700
- Eines vortrefflichen Poeten Geist- u. Weltliche Gedichte, 1715.
