= François Vaillant de Gueslis =

François Vaillant de Gueslis (20 July 1646 – 24 September 1718) was a Jesuit missionary, born in Orléans. He entered the Society of Jesus, on 10 November 1665, and went to Canada in 1670; and was ordained priest at Quebec, on 1 December 1675.

He attempted to convert the Mohawks to Christianity between 1679 and 1684. In the beginning of 1688 he was chosen by the Canadian authorities as ambassador to Thomas Dongan, the Governor of New York, that Dongan might facilitate peace between the French and the Iroquois, but negotiations were not fruitful due to Dongan's conditions and the opposition of the Huron chief Kondiaronk.

He was the first missionary to work among the Native Americans in Detroit; but he remained only a few months, not entering into the plans of Antoine Laumet de La Mothe, sieur de Cadillac. After the conclusion of peace between the French and the Iroquois he attempted to convert the Senecas from 1702 to 1707. There he contributed to the defeat of the efforts of Colonel Schuyler at Onondaga who was trying to induce the Five Nations to drive out the French missionaries. Quebec and Montreal were the two locations where he did most of his work. At Quebec (1685–91; 1697–1702), he filled the important posts of minister; procurator of the mission, and preacher, and at Montreal (1692–96; 1709–15), he was the first superior of the residence established by the Jesuits in 1693. He returned to France in 1715.

He died in Moulins in 1718.

== Sources ==
- Campeau, Lucien (1979–2016). "Vaillant de Gueslis, François". Dictionary of Canadian Biography (online ed.). University of Toronto Press.
- Melançon, Arthur (1912). "François Vachon de Belmont" . In Herbermann, Charles (ed.). Catholic Encyclopedia. Vol. 15. New York: Robert Appleton Company.
