= Waban, Massachusetts =

Village in Massachusetts, United States

Coordinates: 42°19′40″N 71°13′38″W

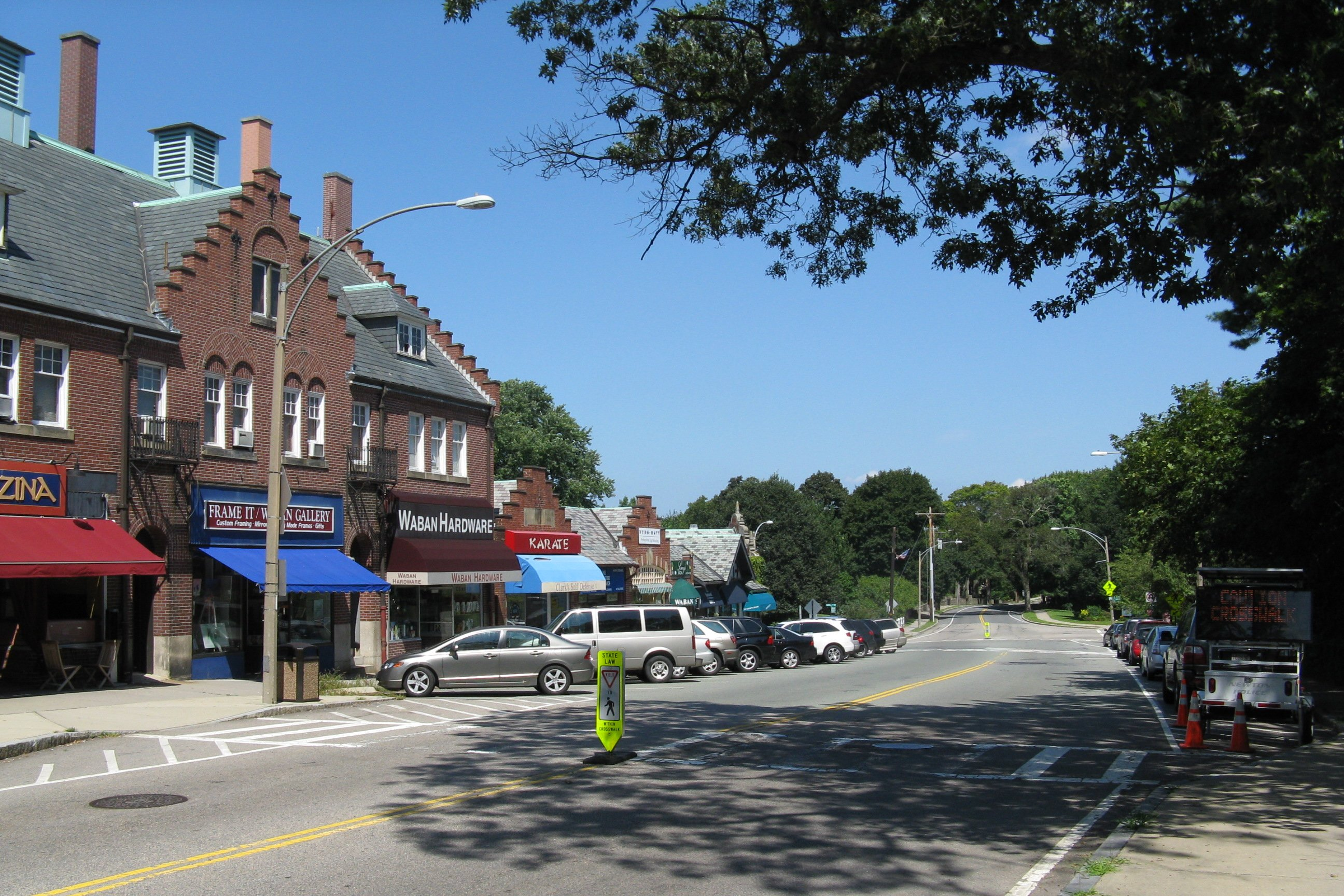
The Strong Building, Beacon Street

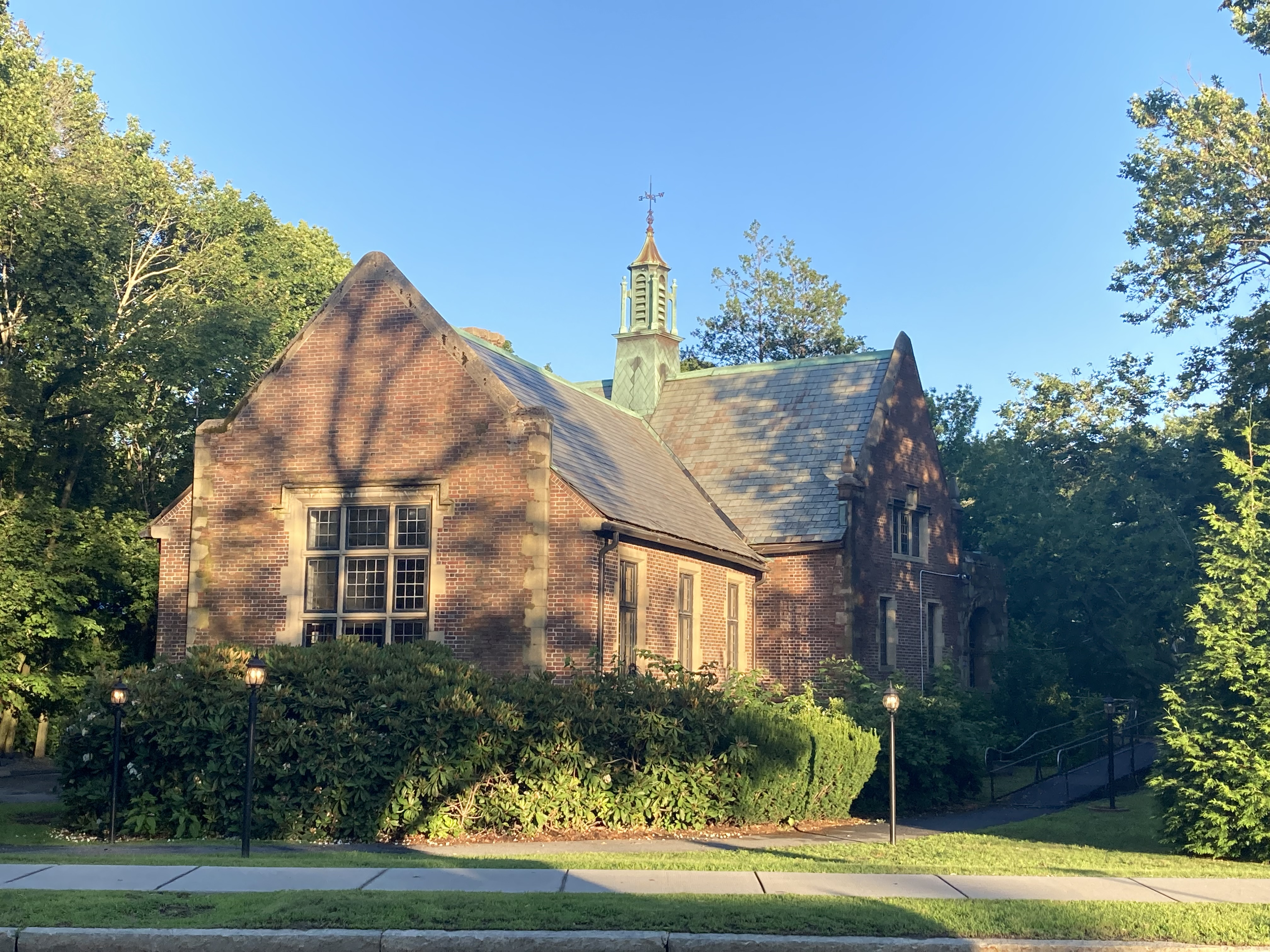
Waban Library Center, Newton, Massachusetts

Waban is one of the thirteen villages within the city of Newton in Middlesex County, Massachusetts, United States.

== Geography and history ==
Waban is bordered by the Charles River and Route 9 to the south, and Route 16 to the west. Waban was once a heavily forested area which developed as an agricultural village in the 19th century. By the 1860s, it was known for its orchards, farms and nurseries. The Cochituate Aqueduct, now partly converted to a walking trail, was built in 1846–1848 and ran through the village. Development in Waban accelerated after 1886 with the opening of the rail station by the Boston & Albany Railroad as part of the Highland Branch extending to Riverside, which has since been converted to the D Branch of the MBTA Green Line

== Origin of name ==
The village of Waban was named for Waban, a Native American leader whose Massachusett tribe converted to Christianity and was eventually moved to a Praying Village in Natick in 1646. Although he may have lived closer to Nonantum, a hill two miles away, this area alongside the Charles River did provide hunting and fishing grounds.

To explain why the village took on this name in 1886, Dr. Lawrence Strong, in his history of the town, later wrote:

My father, William Chamberlain Strong, was very active in securing the right-of-way for the Boston and Albany Railroad at the time the Newton Circuit Road was built. The location of a station here marked a potential village, and a name was required. My father had previously lived on Nonantum Hill in Brighton, where Waban, the Chief of the Indian tribe Nonantum, had his wigwam, and where Eliot, the Apostle to the Indians, preached. A memorial marks this spot today. So the name "Waban" for the new village easily suggested itself to my father. I am told Waban, or Wabanoki, means "east" in the Indian tongue. The spelling of the name cannot be held to coincide with its pronunciation. I believe the pronunciation is correct and the correct spelling would be either Wauban or more probably Waughban.

== Education and health care ==
Waban has two elementary schools, Angier, named after Albert E. Angier (1897–1918), who was killed fighting in World War I, and Zervas, (formerly the Beethoven School) named for Dr. Frank Zervas, a school principal. The original Waban School opened in 1900, was renamed the Angier School in 1921, and was replaced by a state-of-the-art schoolhouse in 2016.

The Newton-Wellesley Hospital is on the western edge of Waban and serves a wide population.

== Notable buildings and open space ==
Notable buildings in Waban include:

- The Staples-Craft-Wiswall Farmhouse, now the home of the Suzuki School of Newton
- Waban Hall (1890)
- The Parish of the Good Shepherd (1896)
- The Strong Building (1896)
- The Union Church in Waban (1912)
- The Waban Library Center (1930)

An area on Beacon Street near where the shopping area of Waban now stands was originally the site of a working farm for the indigent.

The first librarian was Dr. Fanny McGee, also one of the first women physicians, earning her Doctor of Medicine degree from Tufts Medical School in 1897. The library gained a permanent home when the branch library was built in 1930. The village was one of two in Newton to retain its branch library, the last of sixteen original branches closed by June 2008. In September 2009, the Waban branch library re-opened as the Waban Library Center, a community-based facility run by the Waban Improvement Society.

Waban Common, a community-maintained, landscaped public green space adjoining Beacon Street, was created in 2017, by reimagining and merging two traffic islands in conjunction with the construction of the new Angier School.

== Zip code ranking ==
In the Washington Post's 2013 study of the most affluent and well-educated zip codes in America, Waban (02468) ranked third in the nation. The study was based on an index of the percent of college graduates and median household income in each of America's zip codes. It ranked only behind Kenilworth, Illinois, and Short Hills, New Jersey, making it the most affluent zip code in the state.

According to the Census Bureau, Waban (02468) has the 14th highest median household income in the United States and the highest in Massachusetts, as of 2017.

== Notable people ==
- Harry C. Bentley (1877–1967) founder of Bentley University, had Master Builder Charles Train build the house at 1700 Beacon Street and lived there with his wife, Belle.
- Ralph Waldo Emerson (1803–1882), resided on Woodward Street in 1833–34
- Atul Gawande, surgeon, writer, global and public health advocate
- Roger Kellaway (born 1939), Grammy-winning pianist, composer
- Jack Lemmon, born in an elevator at Newton-Wellesley Hospital in Waban
- Robert Morse, Tony award-winning actor
- Ric Ocasek, music producer and vocalist for The Cars. Resident of Waban during the 1980s
- Fritz Richmond, folk musician, played jug and washtub bass in the Jim Kweskin Jug Band
- Mark Sandman, rock and roll musician, singer, and songwriter, member of the groups Treat Her Right and Morphine
- Henry Lawrence Southwick (1863–1932), author, actor and 3rd President of Emerson College from 1908 to 1932
- Cass Sunstein, legal scholar, author, and federal agency leader
- Jason Varitek, catcher, Boston Red Sox, 2004 and 2007 World Series Champion
- Ben Wanger (born 1997), American-Israeli baseball pitcher, Team Israel

== See also ==
- List of Registered Historic Places in Newton, Massachusetts
- Pine Ridge Road–Plainfield Street Historic District
- Waban
- Waban (MBTA station)
- Waban, the Wind by Arthur Morris Southwick (of Waban)
