= Eugène Lami =

French painter (1800–1890)

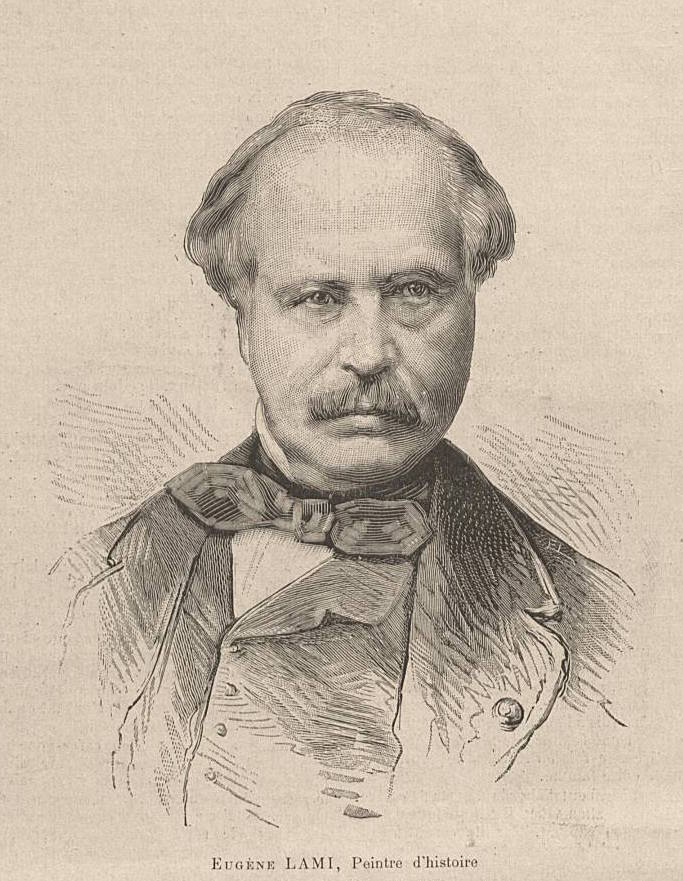
An 1890 illustration of Lami

Eugène Louis Lami (12 January 1800 – 19 December 1890) was a French painter and lithographer. He was a painter of fashionable Paris during the period of the July Monarchy and the Second French Empire and also made history paintings and illustrations for books such as Gil Blas and Manon Lescaut.

== Life ==
He worked at the studio of Horace Vernet then studied at the École des Beaux-Arts in Paris with Camille Roqueplan and Paul Delaroche under Antoine-Jean Gros. While there, he learned watercolor technique from Richard Parkes Bonington and later became a founding member of the Society of French Watercolorists.

Lami began working in lithography and in 1819 produced a set of 40 lithographs depicting the Spanish cavalry. These, plus a collaboration with Vernet on a large set of lithographs titled Collections des uniformes des armées françaises de 1791 à 1814 helped build a reputation for doing military scenes which transferred to his paintings. His 1829 painting of Charles I of England as he was being led to imprisonment in Carisbrooke Castle was purchased by Louis-Philippe of France and was on display in the French National Assembly from 1848 to 1969.

Today, this work along with his 1840 painting of Louise Marie Adélaïde de Bourbon-Penthièvre, duchesse d'Orléans in the gardens of the Tuileries Palace are both in the Louvre. Lami's painting of the 1815 Battle of New Orleans is in the Louisiana State Museum at The Cabildo in New Orleans. He also painted a scene of the storming of Redoubt #10 during the 1781 siege of Yorktown.

== Gallery ==
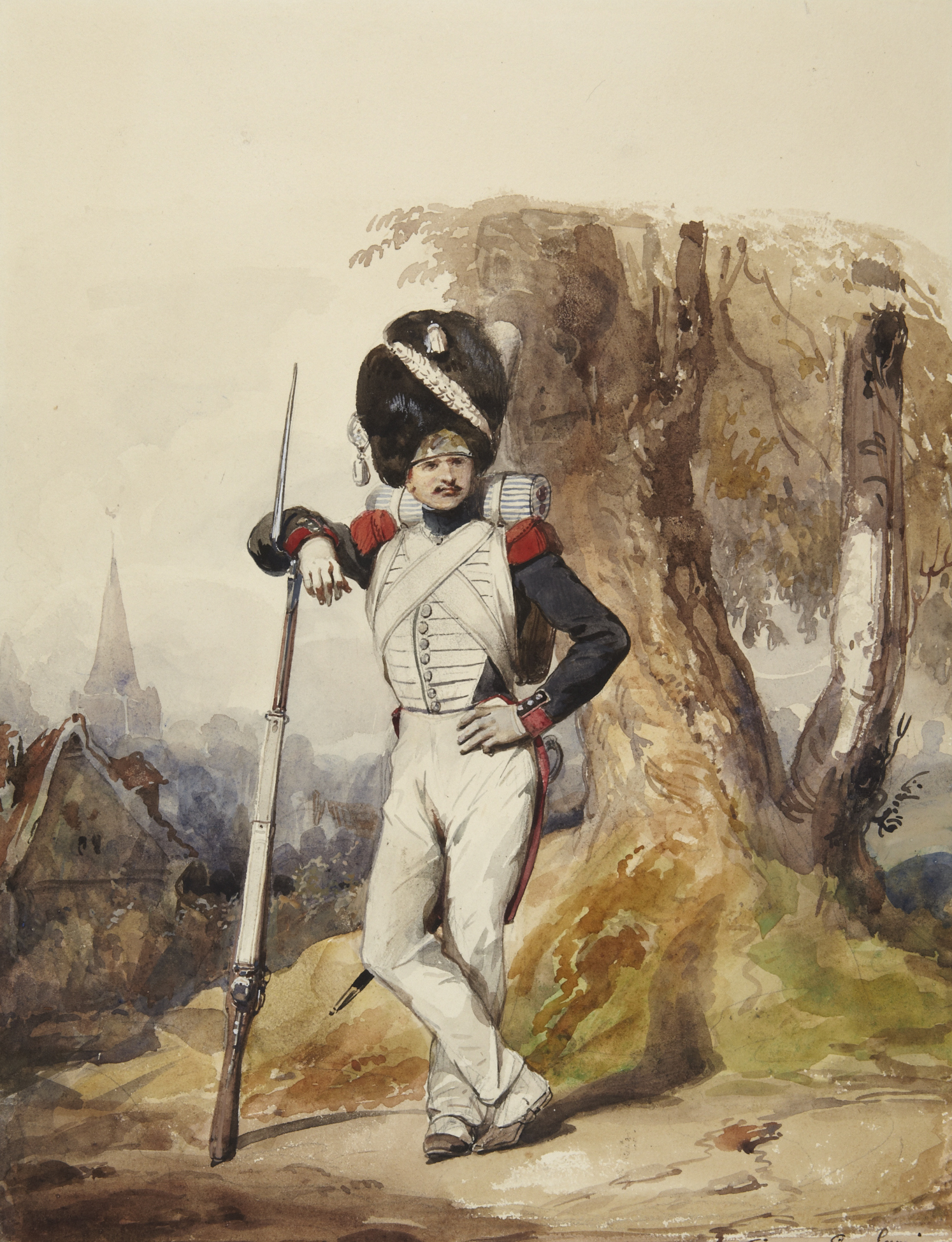
Grenadier of the Royal Guard, ca. 1817, Princeton University Art Museum

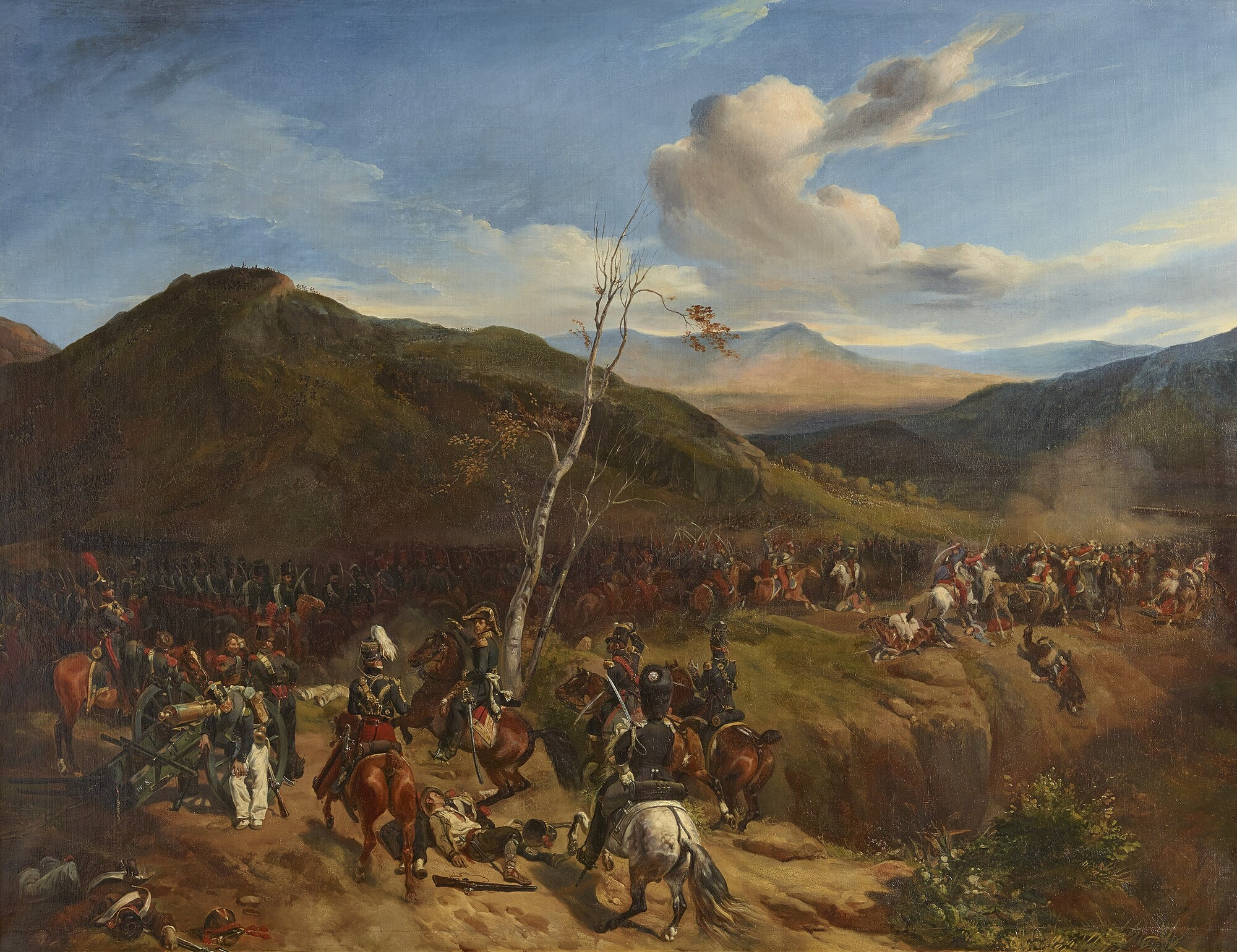
Battle of Miravete, 1823

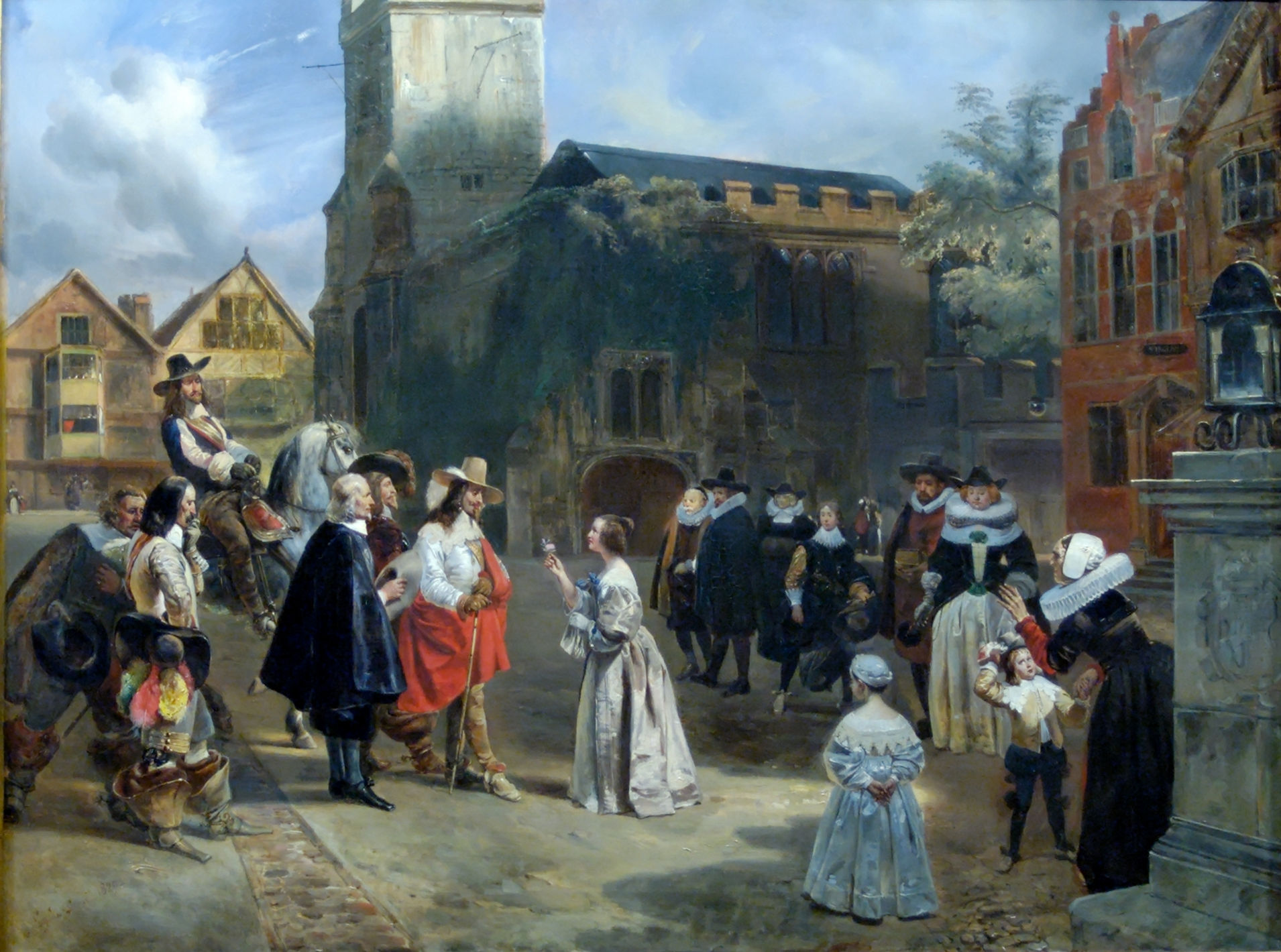
Charles I Receiving a Rose, 1829

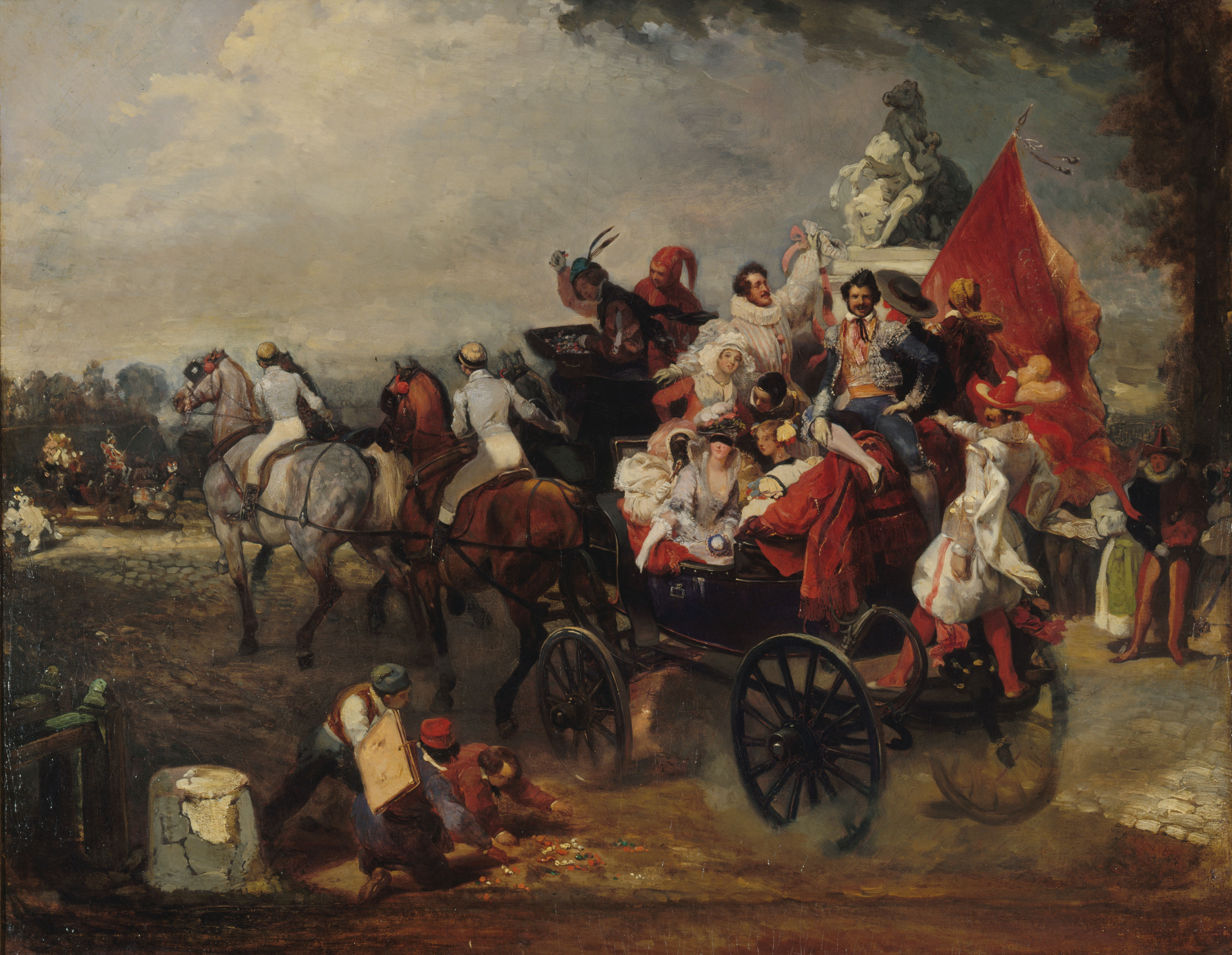
Scène de carnaval, place de la Concord, 1834

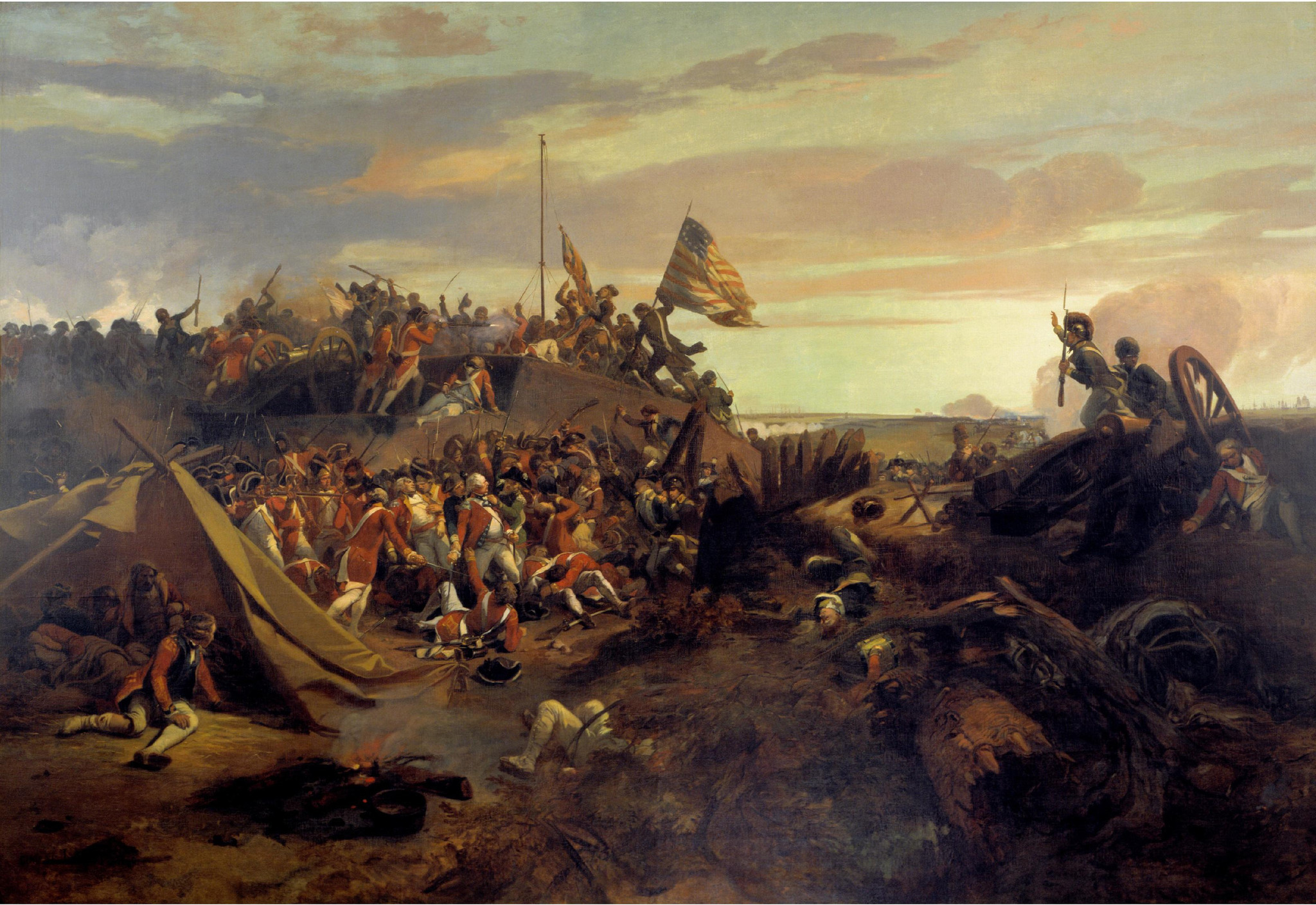
The Storming of Redoubt No. 10, 1840

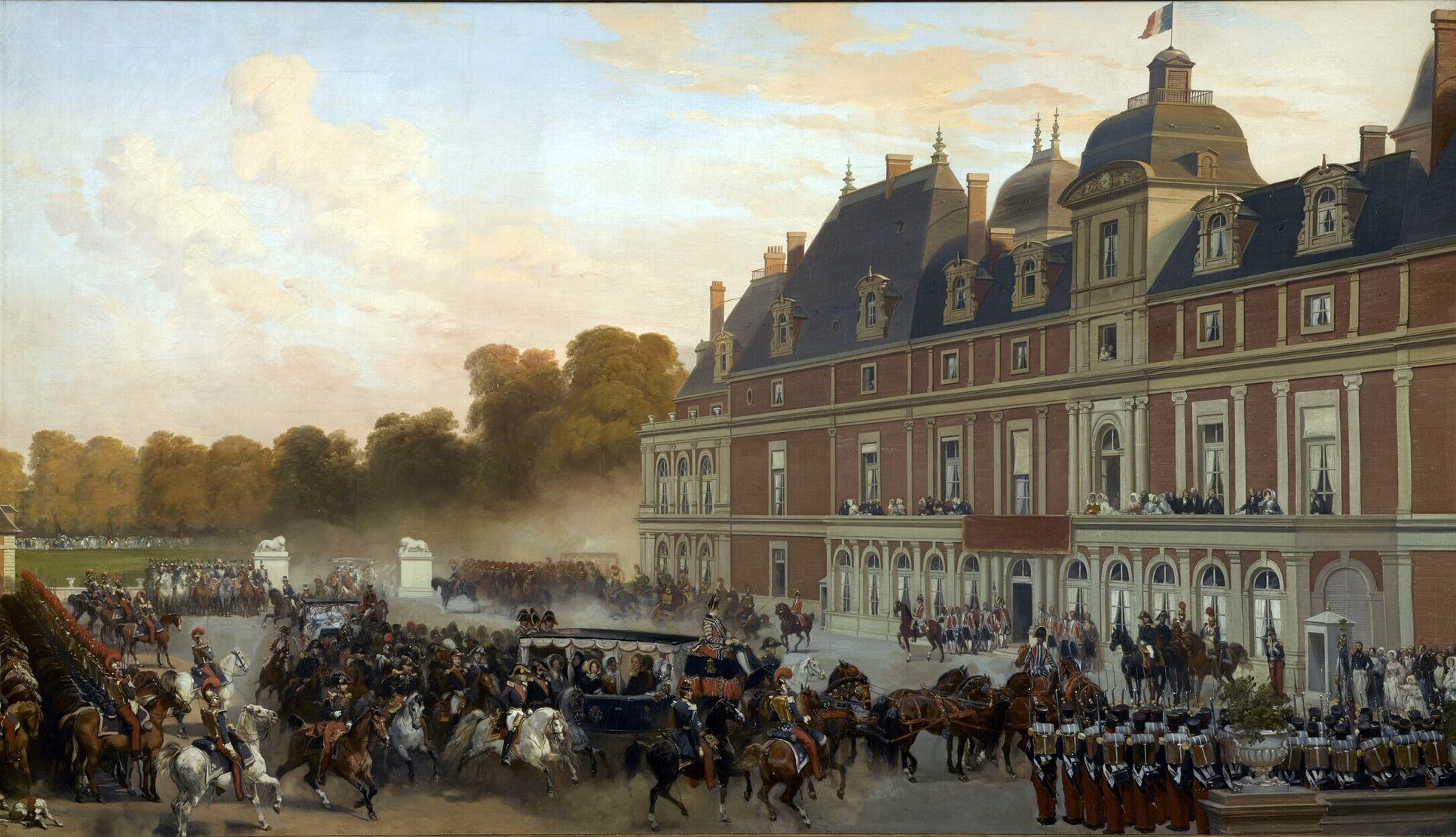
The Arrival of Queen Victoria at the Château d'Eu, 1843

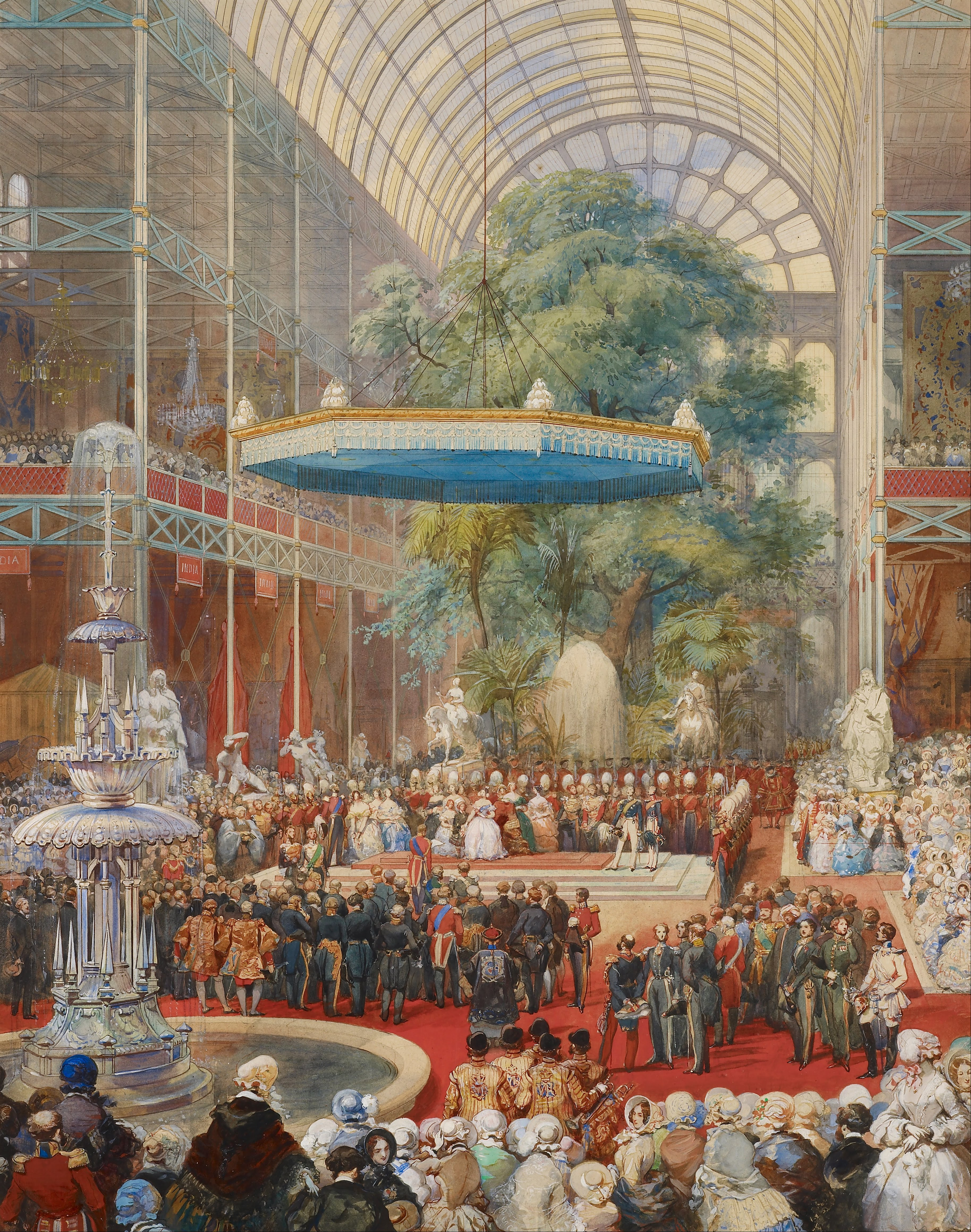
Opening of the Great Exhibition, 1851

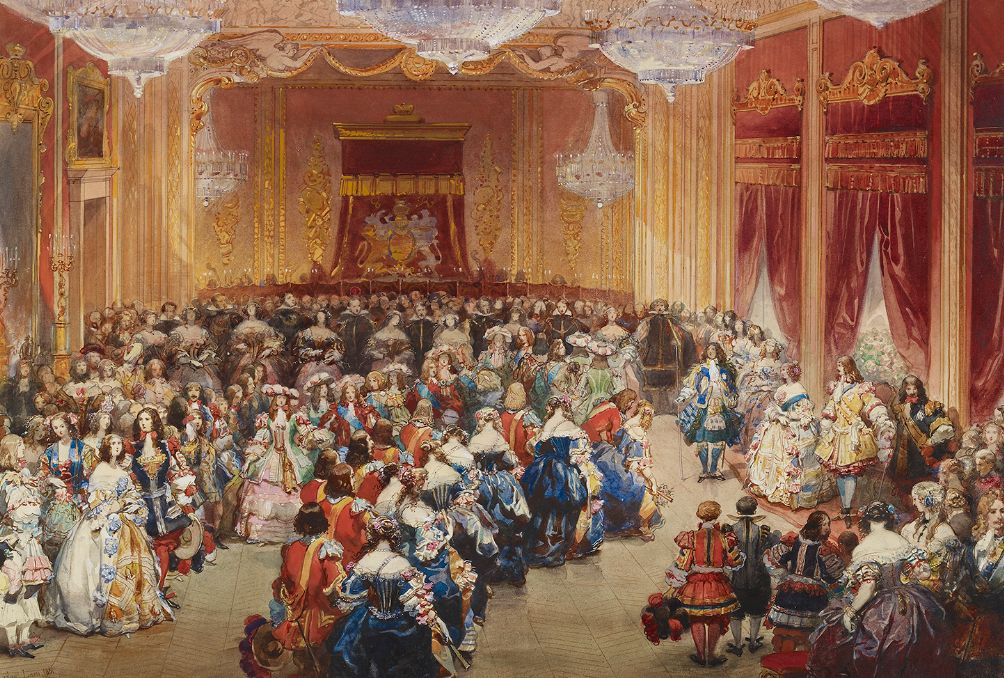
The Stuart Ball at Buckingham Palace, 1851

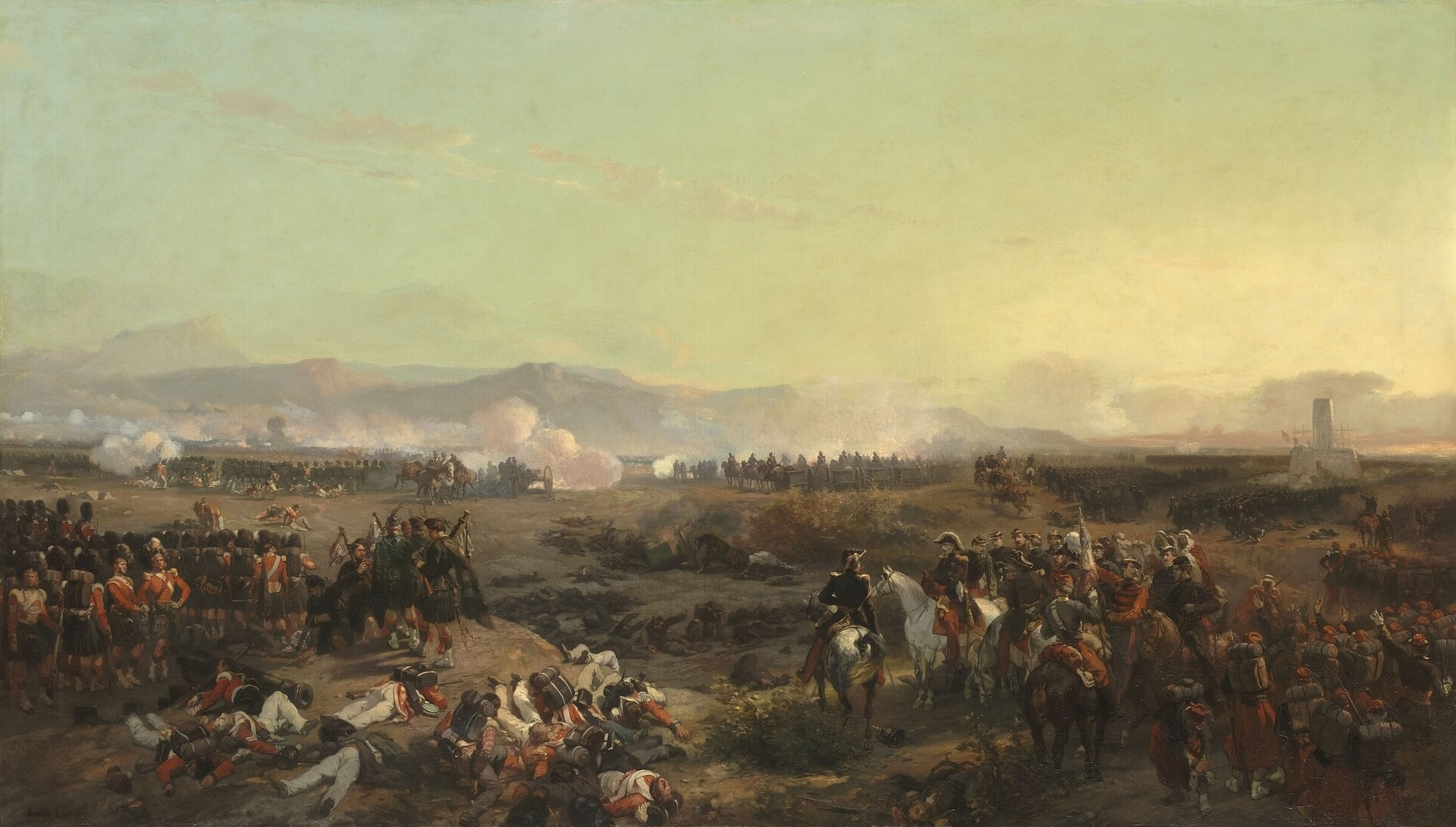
The Battle of the Alma, 1855

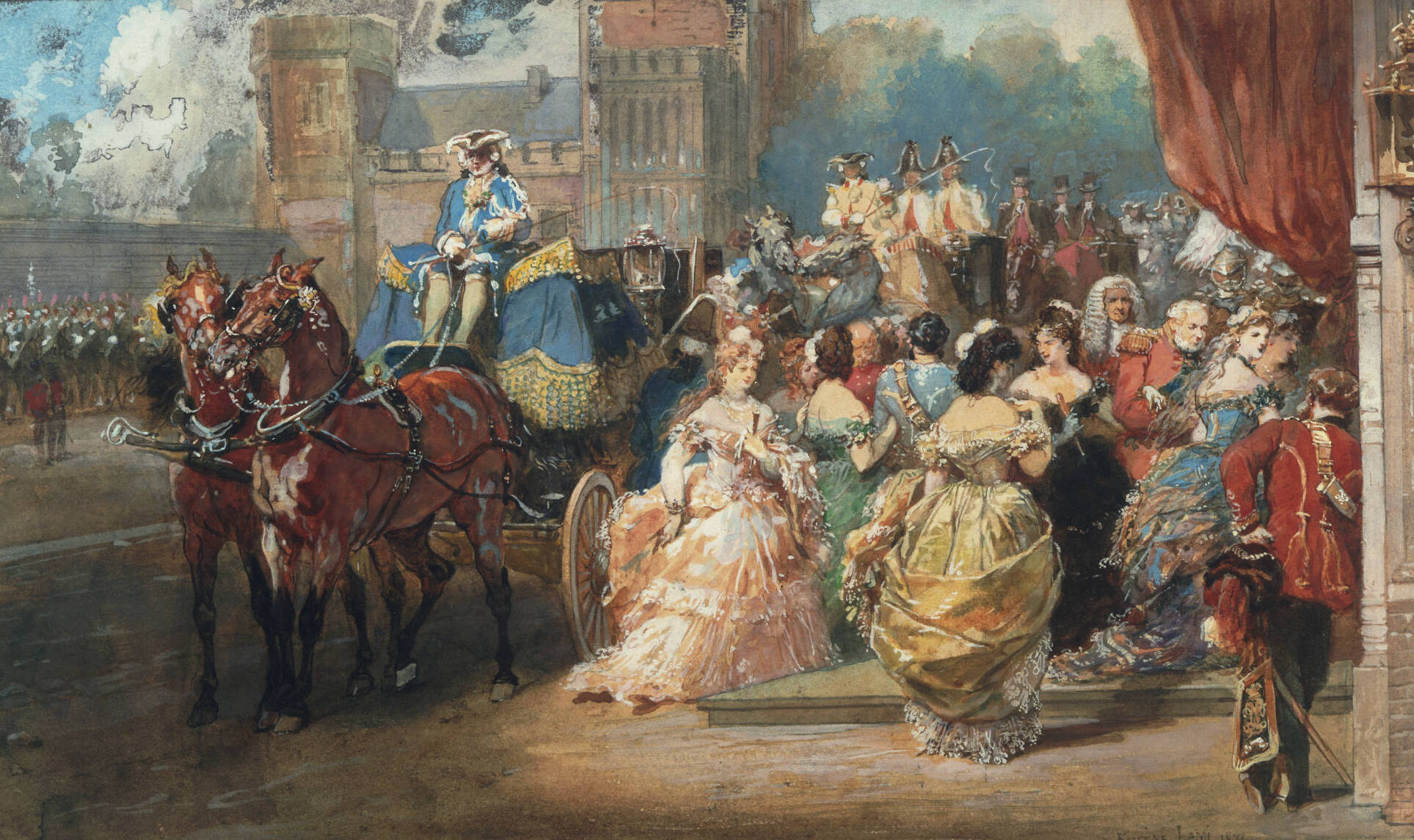
Entry to a Drawing Room at Marlborough House, 1871, Princeton University Art Museum

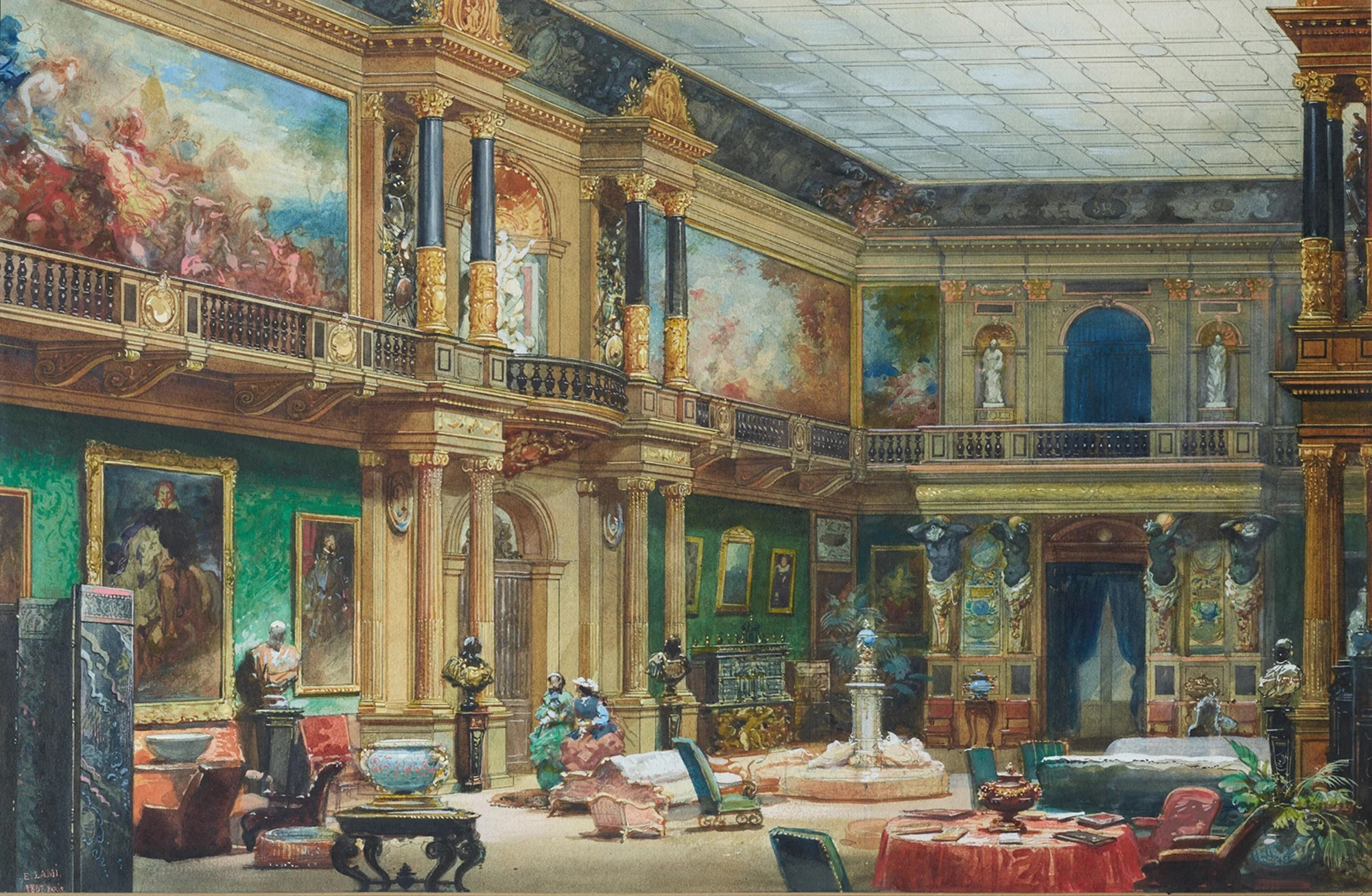
Watercolour painting of The Great Hall at the Château de Ferrières, estate of James Mayer de Rothschild
