= Waban =

Nipmuc man

Waban (c. 1604 – c. 1685) was a Native American of the Nipmuc group and was thought to be the first Native American convert to Christianity in Massachusetts.

== Early life and first contact with the English ==
Little is known about Waban’s youth. By the 1640s he was recognized as the principal man of the Nonantum Native American tribe on the Charles River. On 28 October 1646 Eliot preached the first recorded Massachusett-language sermon in Waban’s wigwam. Invited to ask questions, Waban responded not with theology but with a request for written confirmation “of all the compasse of that hill, upon which the wigwams then stood,” aiming to secure land for his people. He also volunteered his eldest son to be educated in the nearby English town of Dedham—an early instance of calculated engagement with colonial power.

== Role in founding the praying towns ==
Puritan chroniclers credited Waban’s land petition with catalyzing Eliot’s plan for a settled Christian community. Around 1651 many Nonantum families relocated to Natick, the first officially recognized praying town. While English leaders viewed the move as a tool of conversion and social control, Waban leveraged it to preserve Massachusett territory amid accelerating colonial encroachment. In Natick he served as constable and counsellor, mediating disputes between Native and English jurisdictions.

== Christian profession and political stance ==
Although lionized by missionaries as a model Christian, Waban’s own 1652 confession remained ambivalent—he admitted he “did not truly pray to God in my heart,” a statement that satisfied Puritan authorities while preserving personal agency. Later fictional dialogues published in the so-called Eliot Tracts exaggerated his zeal, reflecting colonial expectations more than Native realities.

== King Philip’s War and later years ==
During King Philip's War (1675–1676) Waban, his family, and hundreds of other “praying Indians” were forcibly confined to Deer Island in Boston Harbor. Released in the spring of 1676, the aging leader—then ill with dysentery—recovered and spent roughly his final decade near Cambridge on land granted by colonist Thomas Oliver. He likely died about 1685/86.

== Family and successors ==
Waban’s son, commonly known as Thomas Waban (also Weegramomenit), emerged as town clerk and leading figure in Natick from the 1690s into the 1720s. A younger namesake continued to hold local office into the 18th century, illustrating the family’s sustained influence.

== Legacy ==
- The village of Waban, Massachusetts, a neighborhood of Newton, is named in his honor.
- Waban’s interactions with Eliot remain central to scholarship on Indigenous literacy and cultural negotiation in colonial New England.

== Namesakes ==
One of the villages of the city of Newton, Massachusetts, is named Waban, while Nonantum is another village in the city.

A lake in Wellesley, Massachusetts, partially on the grounds of Wellesley College, is named Lake Waban.

Waban Hill is a geologic feature in the village of Chestnut Hill, Massachusetts, in the eastern part of Newton, Massachusetts.

One U.S. Navy ship, USS Waban, a steamer in commission from 1898 to 1919, has been named for Waban, and kept the name (as SS Waban) while in post-Navy mercantile service from 1919 to 1924.

== See also ==
- Praying Indian
- Waban (MBTA station)
- Waban, Massachusetts
- USS Waban (1880)
