= The Tepidarium =

Painting by Lawrence Alma–Tadema

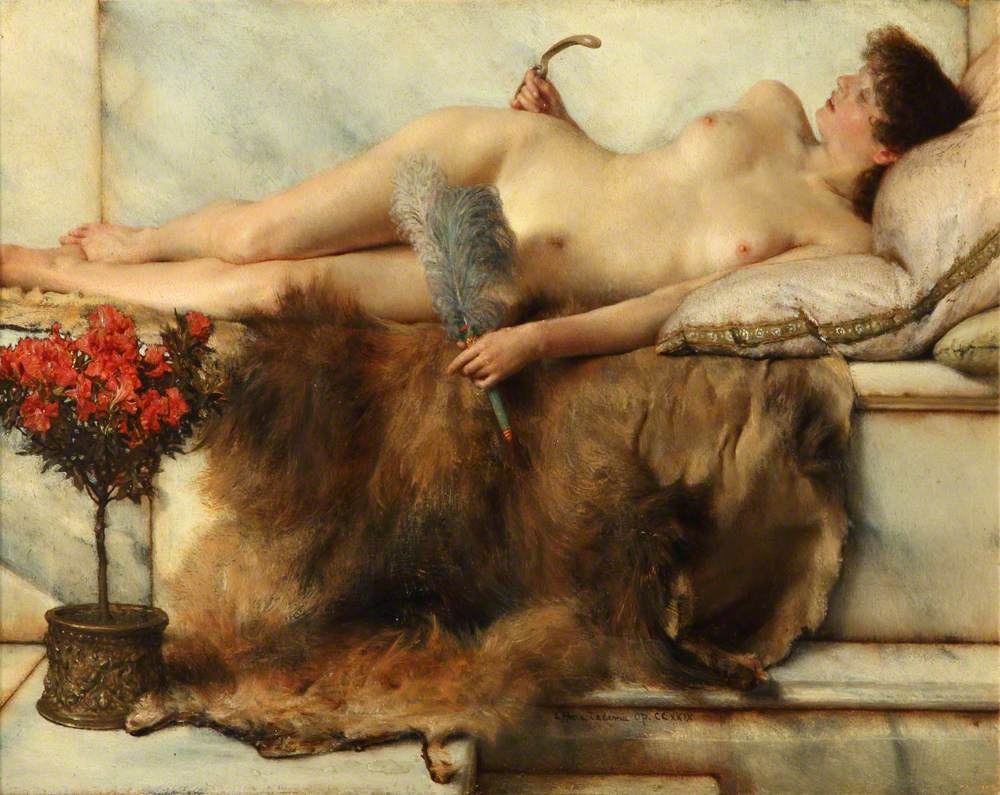
- Artist: Lawrence Alma-Tadema
- Year: 1881
- Type: Oil on canvas, history painting
- Dimensions: 24 cm × 33 cm (9.4 in × 13 in)
- Location: Lady Lever Art Gallery; Merseyside

The Tepidarium is an 1881 history painting by the Dutch artist Lawrence Alma-Tadema. It depicts a scene in a Tepidarium, a warm room in a Roman bathhouse where a nude young woman is reclining, holding a strigil. Alma-Tadema was known for his depictions of the Ancient world and his use of such a setting allowed him to avoid accusations of indecency as female nudes were often disapproved of by critics in the Victoria era. It was considered for use in an advert by Pears Soap. Also known as In the Tepidarium, the work was displayed at the Gallery Georges Petit in Paris in 1882 and then at the Grosvenor Gallery in London in 1883. Today the painting is in the collection of the Lady Lever Art Gallery, having been gifted by Lord Leverhulme in 1922.

== See also ==
- Tepidarium, an 1853 painting by Théodore Chassériau

== Bibliography ==
- Barrow, Rosemary J. Lawrence Alma-Tadema. Phaidon Press, 2001.
- Corbett, David Peters. The World in Paint: Modern Art and Visuality in England, 1848-1914. Manchester University Press, 2004.
- Liversidge, Michael & Edwards, Catherine. Imagining Rome British Artists and Rome in the Nineteenth Century. Merrell Holberton, 1996.
- Smith, Alison. The Victorian Nude: Sexuality, Morality, and Art. Manchester University Press, 1996.
