= Tepidarium =

Warm bathroom of the Roman baths

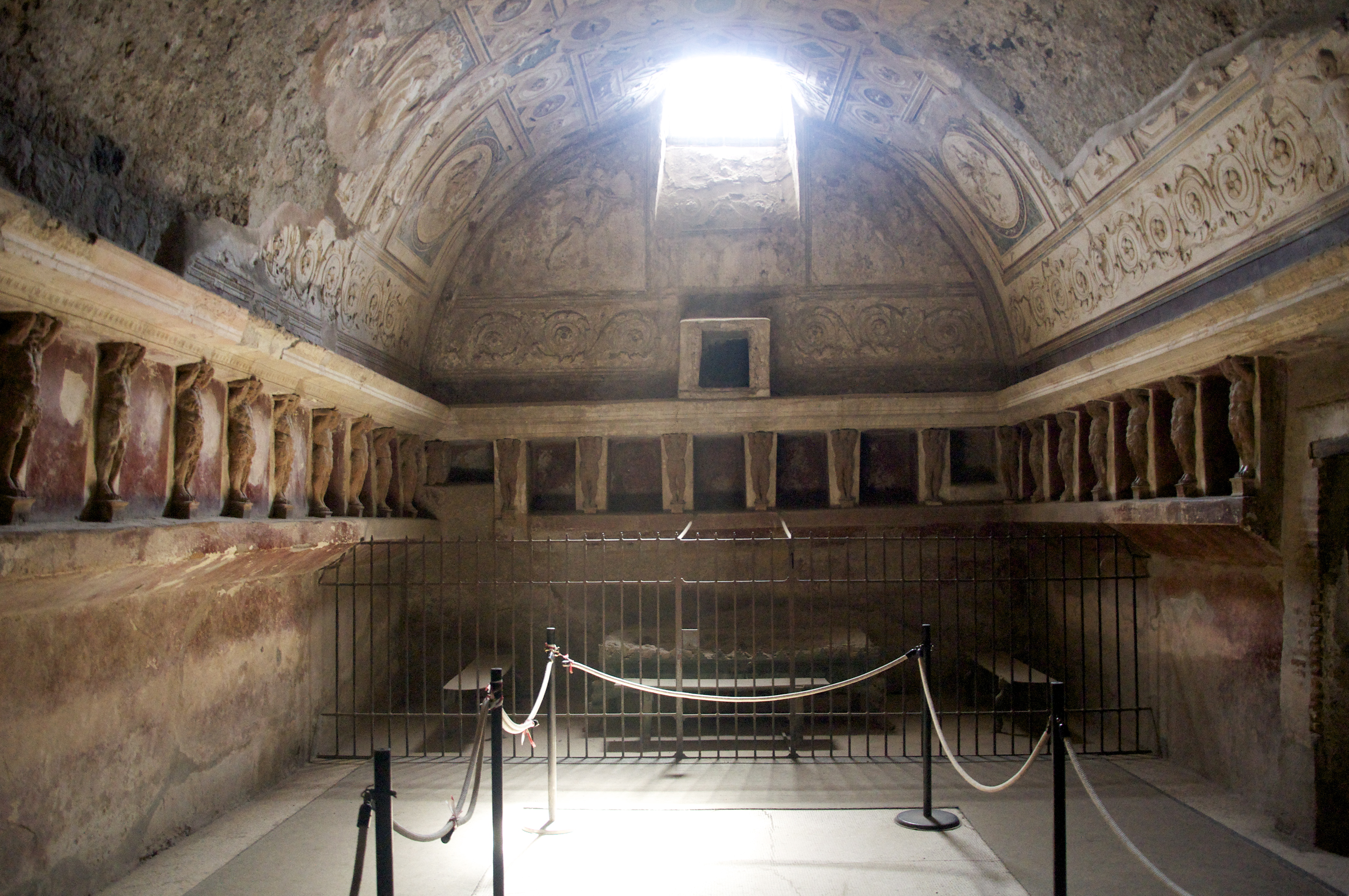
Tepidarium in the Forum Thermae at Pompeii

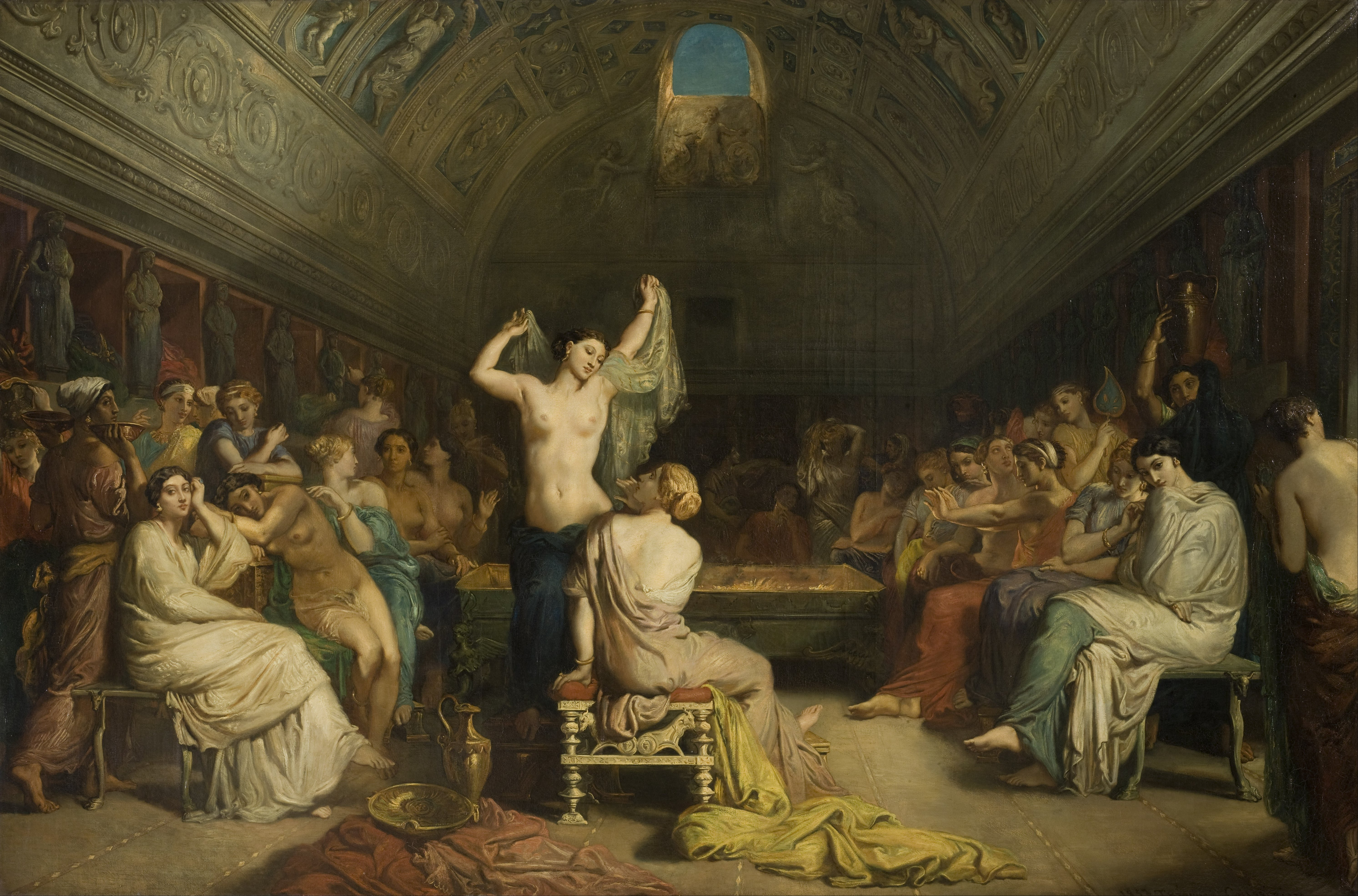
Tepidarium by Théodore Chassériau, 1853

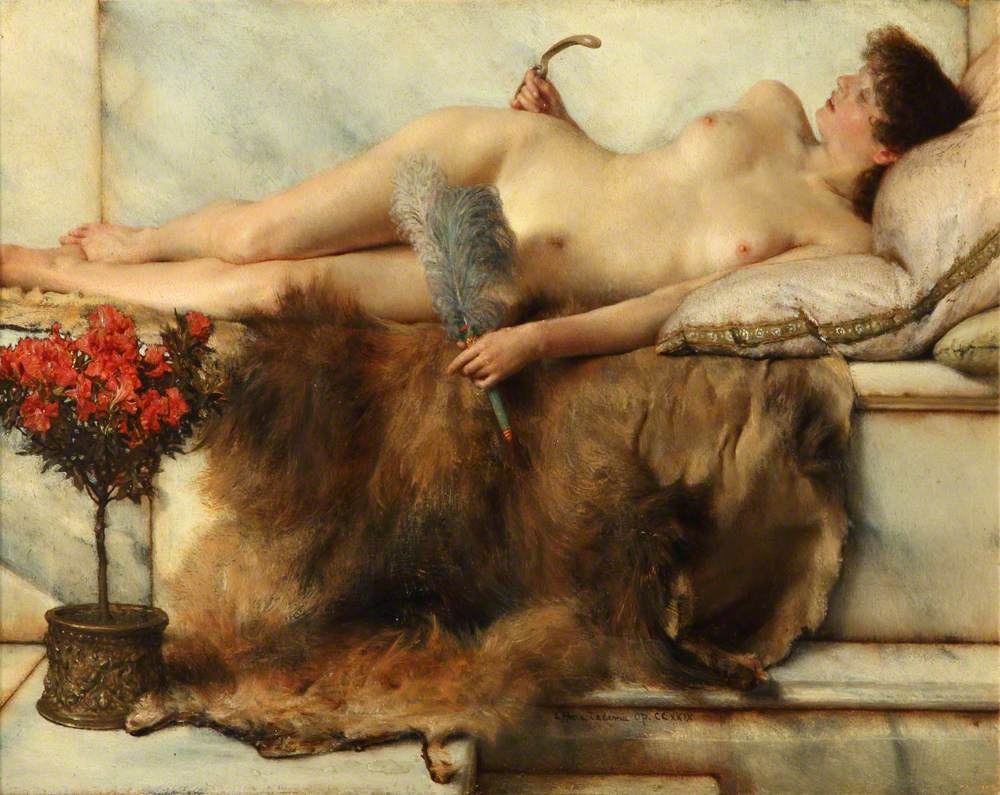
The Tepidarium by Lawrence Alma-Tadema, 1881

The tepidarium was the warm (tepidus) bathroom of the Roman baths heated by a hypocaust or underfloor heating system. The speciality of a tepidarium is the pleasant feeling of constant radiant heat, which directly affects the human body from the walls and floor.

A notable example at Pompeii is covered with a semicircular barrel vault, decorated with reliefs in stucco, and round the room a series of square recesses or niches divided from one another by telamones. The tepidarium was the great central hall, around which all the other halls were grouped, and which gave the key to the plans of the thermae. It was probably the hall where the bathers first assembled prior to passing through the various hot baths (caldarium) or taking the cold bath (frigidarium). The tepidarium was decorated with the richest marbles and mosaics; it received its light through clerestory windows on the sides, the front, and the rear, and would seem to have been the hall in which the finest treasures of art were placed.

In the Baths of Caracalla, the Farnese Hercules and the Farnese Bull (now in the National Archaeological Museum, Naples), the two gladiators, the sarcophagi of green basalt, and numerous other treasures were found during the excavations by Pope Paul III.

== See also ==
- Ancient Roman bathing
