= Macbeth and the Three Witches =

1855 painting by Théodore Chassériau

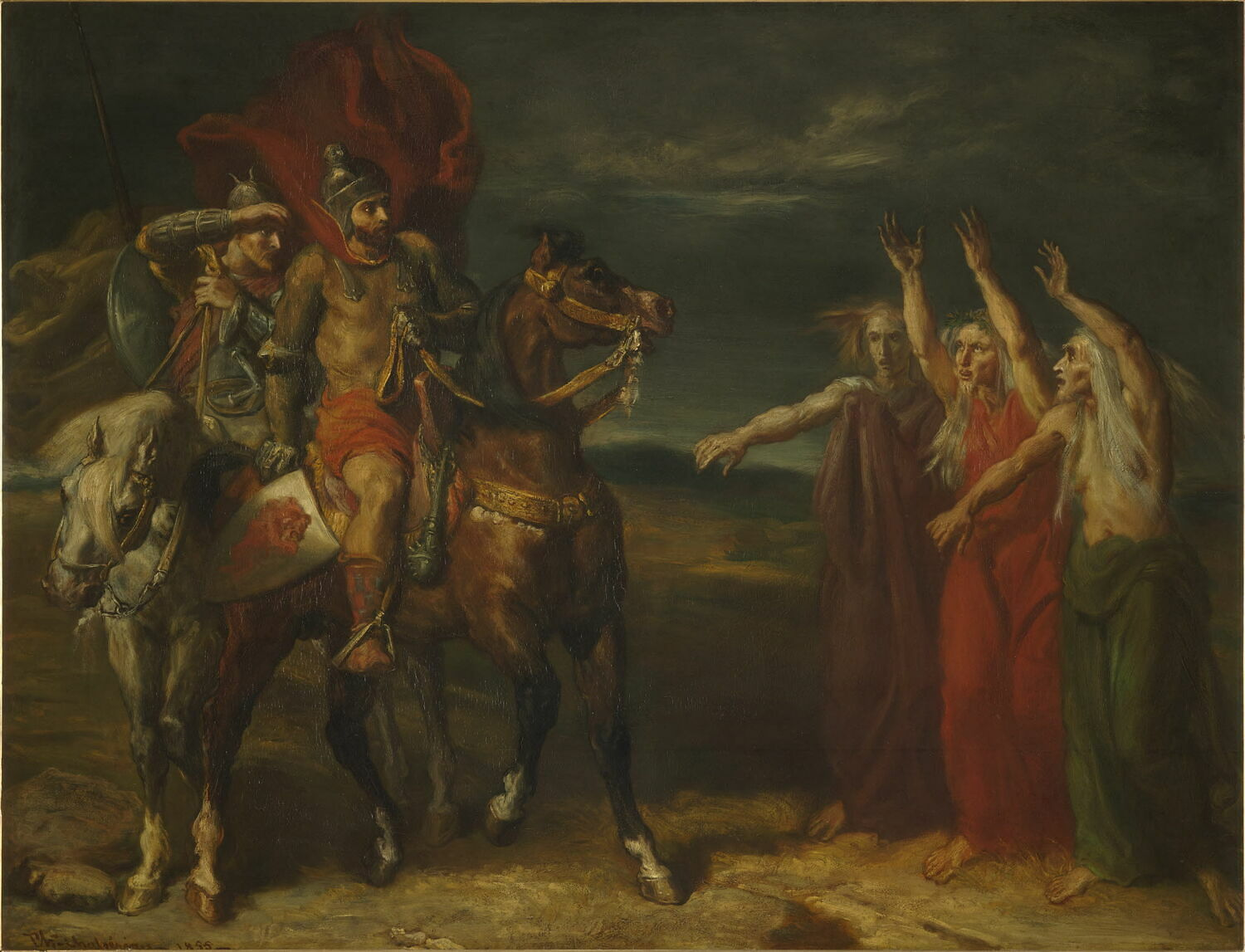
- Artist: Théodore Chassériau
- Year: 1855
- Type: Oil on panel, history painting
- Dimensions: 70 cm × 92 cm (28 in × 36 in)
- Location: Musée d'Orsay, Paris

Macbeth and the Three Witches (French: Macbeth et les trois sorcières) is an oil painting on canvas by the French artist Théodore Chassériau, from 1855. It is inspired by a scene from William Shakespeare's 1623 tragedy Macbeth, when Macbeth, accompanied on horseback by Banquo, encounters the Three Witches on the moors.

Shakespeare plays were a popular subject for French romantics. The picture was displayed at the Exposition Universelle of 1900, as part of a retrospective of French art of the nineteenth century. The painting was acquired in 1918 by the Louvre in Paris and was later transferred to the city's Musée d'Orsay.

== See also ==
- Banquo's Ghost, an 1854 painting by Chassériau based on the same play

== Bibliography ==
- Sandoz, Marc Théodore Chassériau, 1819–1856: Catalogue raisonné des peintures et estampes. 1974.
