= Self-Portrait (Chassériau) =

Painting by Théodore Chassériau

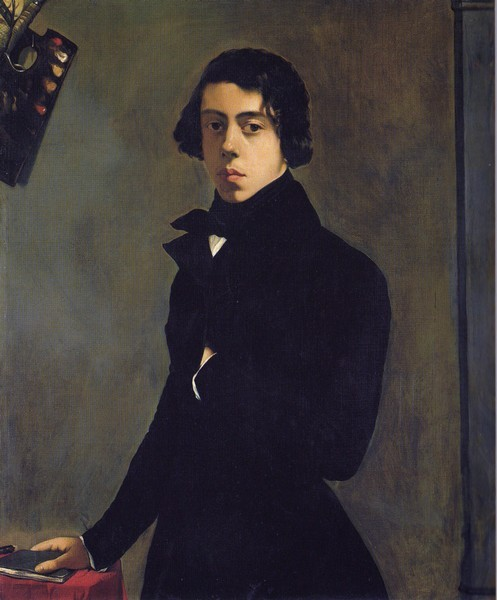
- Artist: Théodore Chassériau
- Year: 1835
- Medium: oil on canvas
- Dimensions: 99 cm × 82 cm (39 in × 32 in)
- Location: Musée du Louvre; Paris

Self-Portrait, or Portrait of the Artist in a Redingote, is an oil-on-canvas painting by French romantic artist Théodore Chassériau, painted in 1835 when the artist was 16. It is housed at the Musée du Louvre, in Paris.

== Description and analysis ==
One of the few self-portraits Chassériau painted, Portrait of the Artist in a Redingote shows him standing and facing left, one hand concealed within his black jacket, a small book held within his other hand, at rest upon a red tablecloth. In the background is a gray-green wall, upon which hangs a palette in the upper left corner. The painter's pose is elegant, and his gaze has been described as "astonishingly young, and at the same time, weary".

Although the painting has been compared to classical and contemporary prototypes—portraits by Raphael, Bronzino, Titian, and Ingres have been cited as inspirations—the painting is consistent with a series of portraits of family members painted by Chassériau in his youth. The portrait is a frank portrayal of Chassériau's unattractive features, much commented upon during his life: Alice Ozy, later his mistress, referred to him as "the monkey". By comparison, a self-portrait of 1838, also in the Louvre, appears more idealized.
