= Tepidarium (painting) =

Painting by Théodore Chassériau

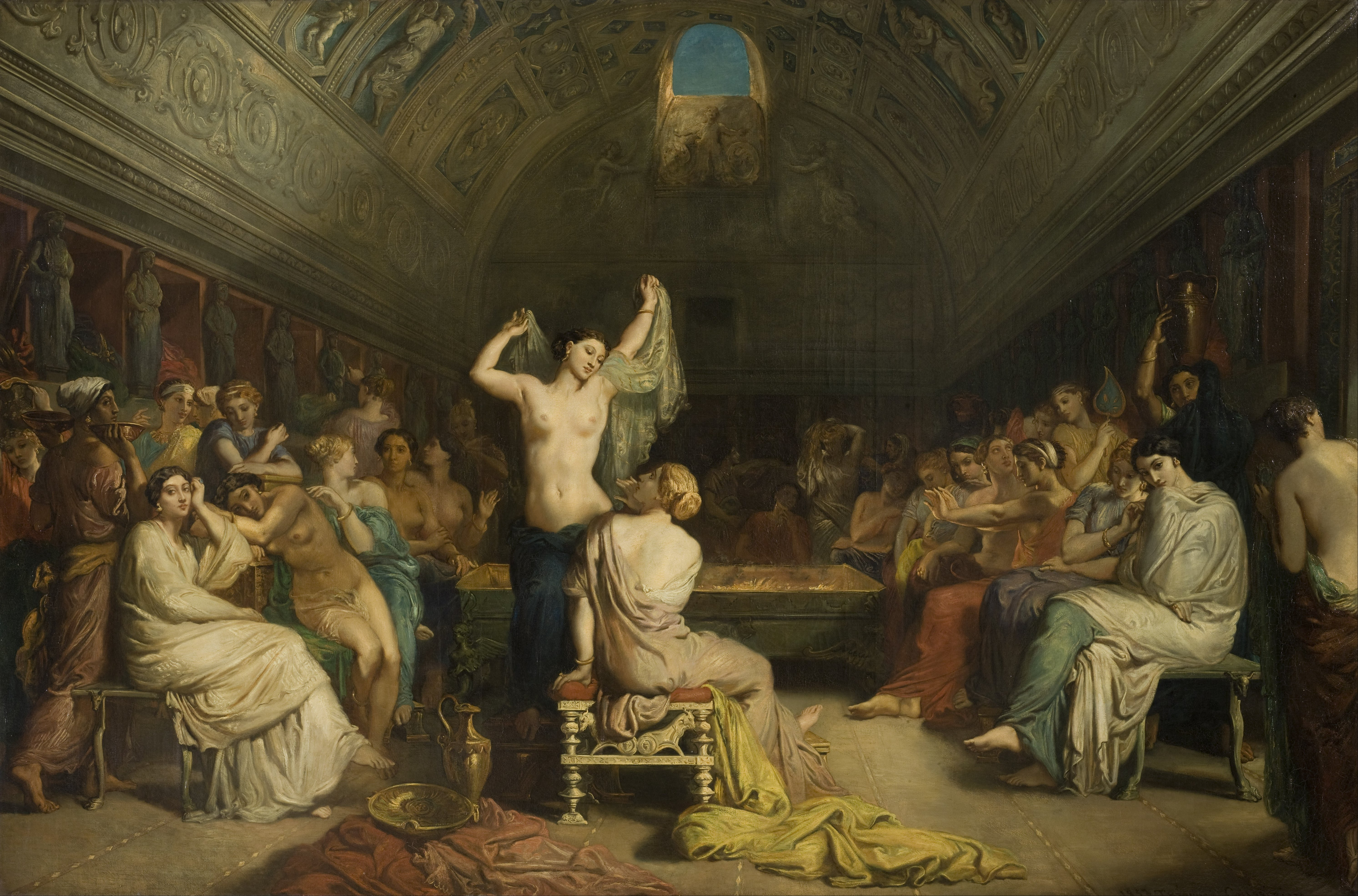
- Artist: Théodore Chassériau
- Year: 1853
- Type: Oil on canvas, history painting
- Dimensions: 171 cm × 258 cm (67 in × 102 in)
- Location: Musée d'Orsay; Paris

Tepidarium is an oil on canvas history painting by the French artist Théodore Chassériau, from 1853. It is held in the Musée d'Orsay, in Paris.

== History and description ==
It depicts a tepidarium in Pompeii during the period of the Roman Empire. Chassériau drew inspiration from an 1840 visit he had made to the remains of the ancient city. The artist was known for his romanticism, although this painting also reflected neoclassicism. The work was displayed at the Salon of 1853 in Paris and again at the Salon of 1855.

In a horizontal format, this canvas depicts women relaxing in the tepidarium of the Pompeii baths. They are not only Roman matrons, as the critic Henri de la Madeleine also identified Greek, African, and Gallic figures in the painting. The tepidarium was a section of the ancient Roman baths intended for warm-water bathing, and Chassériau was able to visit the remains of the tepidarium of the Baths of Venus Genetrix located in the Campanian city.

At the center stands a woman, nude from the waist up, stretching her arms, in a sensuous pose, while being observed by a blonde girl seated beside her. Behind them are several figures of different ethnicities gathered around a brazier used to heat the room. On the left side of the tepidarium sits a Greek woman, cross‑legged, supporting her head with the palm of her hand; according to Paul de Saint‑Victor, she represents a “Melpomene emerging from the bloodbath of tragic finales and contemplating a new carnage.” Behind her, a darker‑skinned woman carries two dishes. On the right side are Roman patrician women and an Eastern woman extending her arms toward the brazier.

== See also ==
- The Tepidarium, an 1881 painting by Lawrence Alma-Tadema

== Bibliography ==
- Hales, Shelley; Paul, Joanna (2011). Pompeii in the Public Imagination from Its Rediscovery to Today. Oxford University Press.
- Murray, Christopher John (2004). Encyclopedia of the Romantic Era, 1760-1850. Vol. 2. Taylor & Francis.
