= Battle of Arab Horsemen Around a Standard =

Painting by Théodore Chassériau

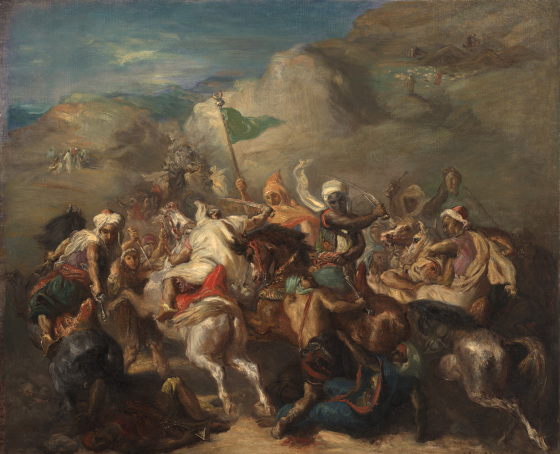
- Artist: Théodore Chassériau
- Year: 1854
- Medium: oil on canvas
- Dimensions: 54 cm × 64 cm (21 in × 25 in)
- Location: Dallas Museum of Art; Dallas

Battle of Arab Horsemen Around a Standard is an oil-on-canvas painting by the French artist Théodore Chassériau, created in 1854. It is signed and dated by the painter. It was developed from sketches he made in Algeria, and it follows the orientalist style of the time. It is housed in the Dallas Museum of Art.

== History and description ==
The painting was created shortly after Chassériau had returned from a trip to Algeria. Like other paintings by Chassériau of Orientalist subjects, it shows the influence of Eugène Delacroix. A figure from his own painting Arabian Riders on Rearing Horses was probably reused to depict the Moor warrior on a white horse at the left of the painting. The Dallas Museum of Art website states that "the subject matter reflected the violent French colonial conquest and occupation of Algeria and would have been charged with political significance for his contemporaries."

The painting is very dramatic and dense, and the soldiers and horses in the center are sketched with loose brushstrokes. The dramatism of the composition is emphasized by the closeness between the participants in the battle and by some gory details, such as the human severed head and his corpse, at the left, in the ground, the bloody swords and the terrified expression of the horses.
