= Diana Surprised by Actaeon =

Painting by Théodore Chassériau

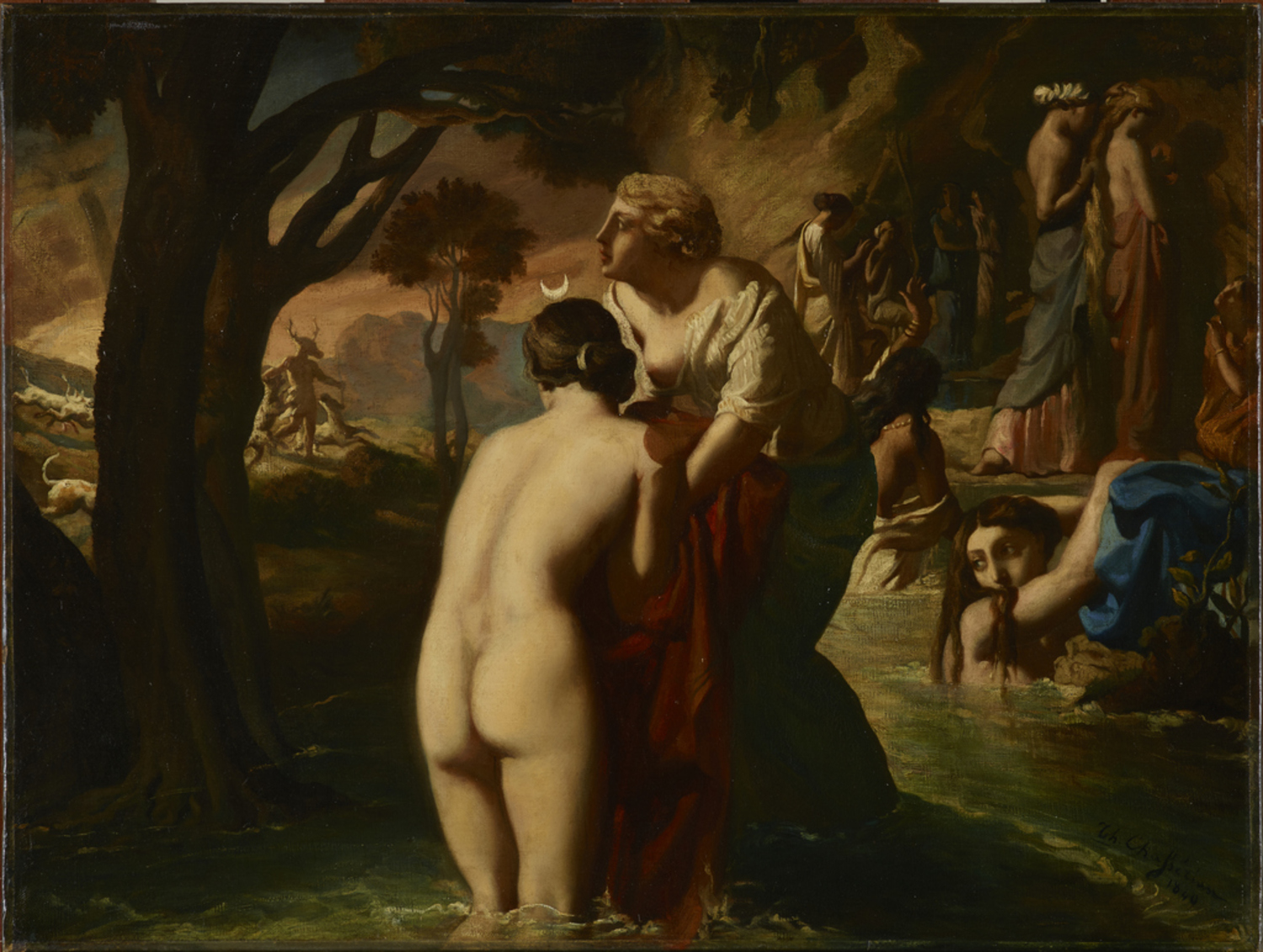
- Artist: Théodore Chassériau
- Year: 1840
- Type: Oil on canvas, history painting
- Dimensions: 55 cm × 74 cm (22 in × 29 in)
- Location: Private collection

Diana Surprised by Actaeon (French: Diane surprise par Actéon) is an oil on canvas history painting by the French artist Théodore Chassériau, from 1840.

It is inspired by the poem Metamorphoses by the Roman writer Ovid. The Goddess Diana is surprised by the hunter Actaeon while bathing. In revenge, she has him transformed into a stag. The painting was rejected by the committee for the Salon of 1840 held at the Louvre in Paris. It was one of a series of nude history paintings that Chassériau produced around this time. The painting was auctioned by Christie's in 2005 for over half a million Euros.

== Bibliography ==
- Guégan, Stéphane. Théodore Chassériau, 1819-1856: The Unknown Romantic. Metropolitan Museum of Art, 2002.
- Sandoz, Marc Théodore Chassériau, 1819-1856: Catalogue raisonné des peintures et estampes. 1974.
