= The Two Sisters (Chassériau) =

Painting by Théodore Chassériau

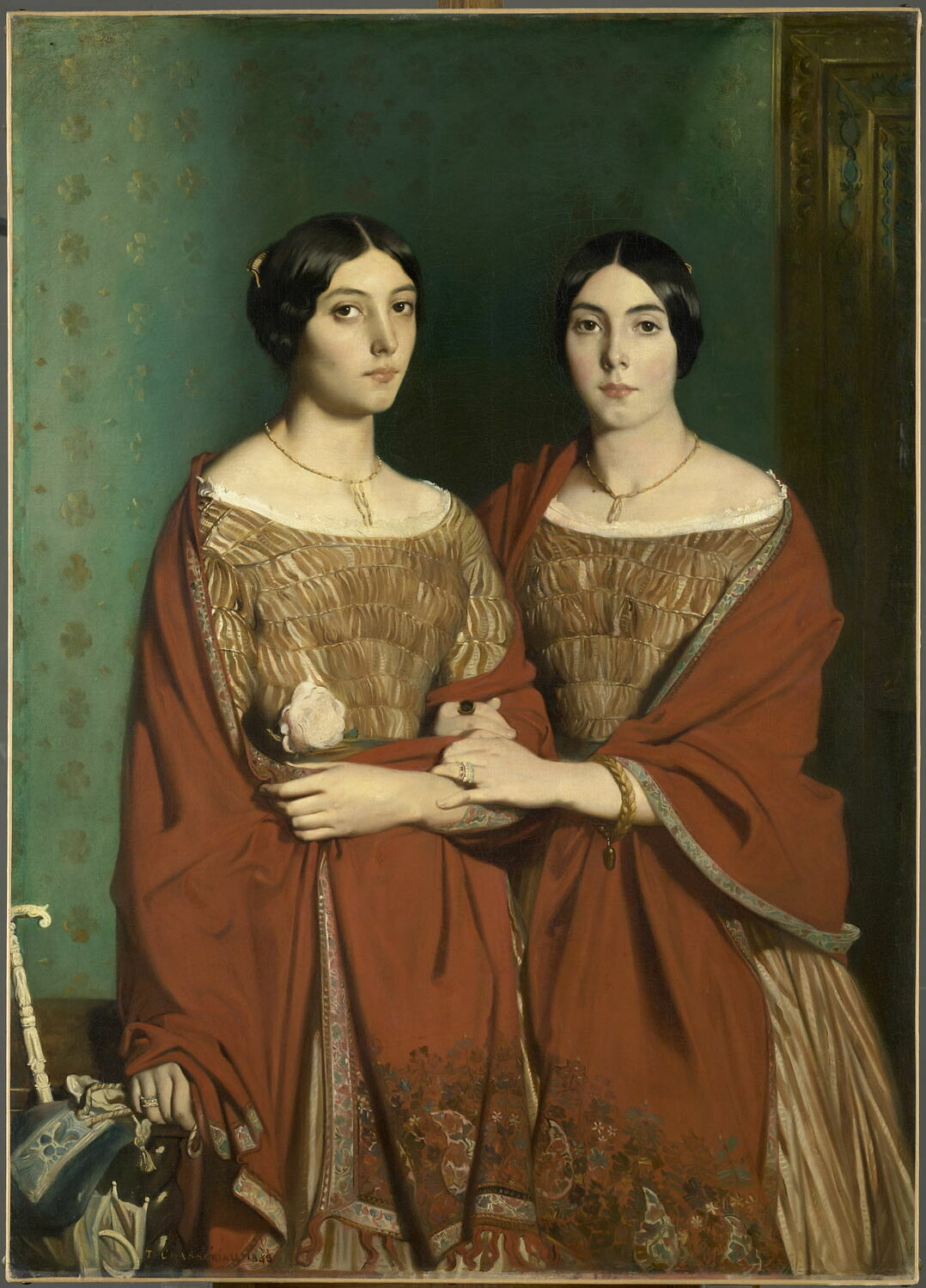
- Artist: Théodore Chassériau
- Year: 1843
- Medium: oil on canvas
- Dimensions: 180 cm × 135 cm (71 in × 53 in)
- Location: Musée du Louvre; Paris

The Two Sisters (French: Les Deux Sœurs, also known as Mesdemoiselles Chassériau) is an oil-on-canvas painting by the French romantic artist Théodore Chassériau, created in 1843. Completed when the artist was twenty-three years of age, it depicts Chassériau's sisters Adèle and Aline. It is housed in the Musée du Louvre, in Paris.

== History and description ==
Chassériau depicted on this canvas his two sisters, who had already served as his models on other occasions. They stand side-by-side. On the left, wearing a lush rose at her waist, is his older sister, Adèle; on the right is Aline. Although the representation of the identically dressed sisters suggests twinship, Adèle was thirty-three and Aline was twenty-one when they posed for the portrait. Their age difference is not apparent in the painting. Both sisters have fine, shiny dark hair parted in the middle and tied back in a bun. They wear similar jewelry. Their two figures, firmly outlined, stand out against the green background.

The work is a product of Chassériau's early maturity, when he was eager to demonstrate his independence from his former master, Jean-Auguste-Dominique Ingres, with whom he had had a falling-out in 1840. Although classically trained under Ingres, Chassériau had become influenced by the Romantic master Eugène Delacroix, as evidenced in this case by the work's strong coloring. He uses almost violent colors, especially in the shawls with which his two sisters are wrapped, a bright red with multi-colored borders.

== Reception ==
When The Two Sisters was exhibited in the Salon of 1843, the response of the critics and the public was mixed. One critic, Louis Peisse, wrote:

M. Chassériau wanted, perhaps unnecessarily, to undertake a difficult thing, to do a painting with two figures of women, both full length, of the same height, both in dresses of the same color and the same fabric, with the same shawl, posed in the same manner, and to sustain that gamble of sorts without using any artifice of light or effect, solely through the authority of style, form, and character. Did he succeed adequately? I do not think so. Nevertheless, he executed that tour de force with a resolution and skill that deserved to prevail.

By the time of Chassériau's death in 1856, The Two Sisters was regarded as one of his most important works. It entered the collection of the Louvre in 1918.

== Bibliography ==
- Gowing, Lawrence (1987). Paintings in the Louvre New York: Stewart, Tabori & Chang. ISBN 1-55670-007-5
- Guégan, Stéphane; Pomaréde, Vincent; Prat, Louis-Antoine (2002). Théodore Chassériau, 1819-1856: The Unknown Romantic. New Haven and London: Yale University Press. ISBN 1-58839-067-5
