= The Toilette of Esther =

Painting by Théodore Chassériau

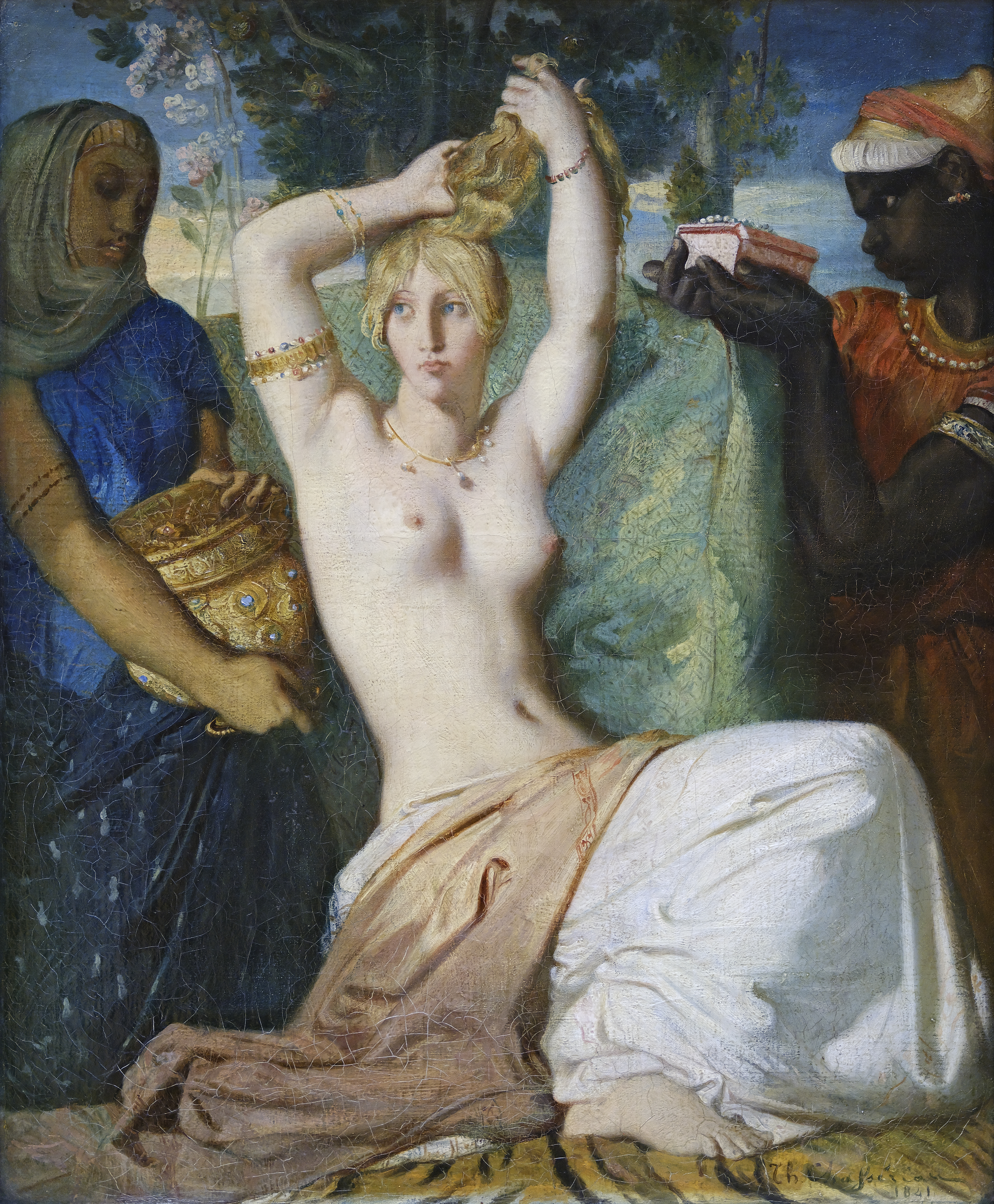
- Artist: Théodore Chassériau
- Year: 1841
- Medium: oil on canvas
- Dimensions: 45.5 cm × 35.5 cm (17.9 in × 14.0 in)
- Location: Louvre; Paris

The Toilette of Esther or Esther Preparing to be Presented to King Ahasuerus, is an 1841 oil-on-canvas painting by the French artist Théodore Chassériau. The painting depicts a moment from the scriptural Book of Esther, when Esther prepared to meet King Ahasuerus, ruler of Persia, who subsequently took her as his wife.

== Narrative ==
The subject derives from the Book of Esther (2:8-9, 15), in which King Ahasuerus, having renounced his wife Vashti, seeks a new queen. Esther, a woman of great beauty, finds favor with Hegai, the eunuch responsible for preparing women for presentation to the king. Upon seeing Esther, Ahasuerus chooses her as his wife. She later reveals that she is Jewish, and intercedes with the king in order to spare the lives of the empire's Jews.

While choosing a biblical theme as a subject, it is likely that Chassériau drew upon more recent literary sources for inspiration. The play Esther, produced by Jean Racine in 1689, offers a more chaste version of Esther's seduction, while describing the artifice employed by her rivals for the king's attention. The exoticism of the painting is closer to an 1817 poem by Alfred de Vigny entitled Le Bain d'une dame romaine, which includes the description:

A slave from Egypt, her skin glistening and black,
Presents her, kneeling, with the pure steel of the mirror,
To tie up her hair, a virgin from Greece,
In Isis's compass joins her two braids....

and is reminiscent also of Les Orientales by Victor Hugo:

Have I not, for you, lovely Jewess,
Sufficiently emptied my seraglio?

The episode had rarely been painted before. Only two previous versions are known: a 17th-century painting by Aert de Gelder, and an 18th-century work by Jean-Francois de Troy. Given the dearth of pictorial illustrations of the story, Chassériau would have looked to paintings of women at their toilette, including depictions of Venus, of which there were more numerous examples.

== Description ==
Esther is shown seated at the center of the canvas, arms above her head as she arranges her blond coiffure. Preparing to offer herself for the king's approval, she holds a pose that is "profoundly erotic in its pictorial treatment". She is nude to the waist except for a necklace and bracelets on her arms; her legs are swathed in white- and rose-colored garments. At the left a servant woman dressed in rich blue brings accessories, and at the right Hegai, clad in bright red, offers a jewel box. Esther acknowledges neither of them, staring out of the picture to the left. Behind them is a landscape of trees and sky.

Several preparatory studies exist. Two drawings in the Louvre evidence an initially circular composition, a tondo like The Turkish Bath that Chassériau's teacher Ingres would paint in 1862. Such experiments underscore Chassériau's desire to find original motifs, as he wrote alongside a drawing at the time: "....Put...the history...of the world in a new way...allowing one to see these beautiful things once again by presenting them in a fresh manner. May 1841. For my painting Esther preparing her toilette". The lush accessories and overall coloring owe something to Chassériau's admiration for Eugène Delacroix.

Art historians have long noted Chassériau's affection for his sisters, and their subconscious influence on the female figures in his art. Perhaps drawing on the recollection of Chassériau's mistress Clémence Monnerot, who said "Adèle has superb arms; they appear everywhere", Jean-Louis Vaudoyer believed that the beauty of the artist's older sister could be found in Esther's "muscular, almost masculine, arms".

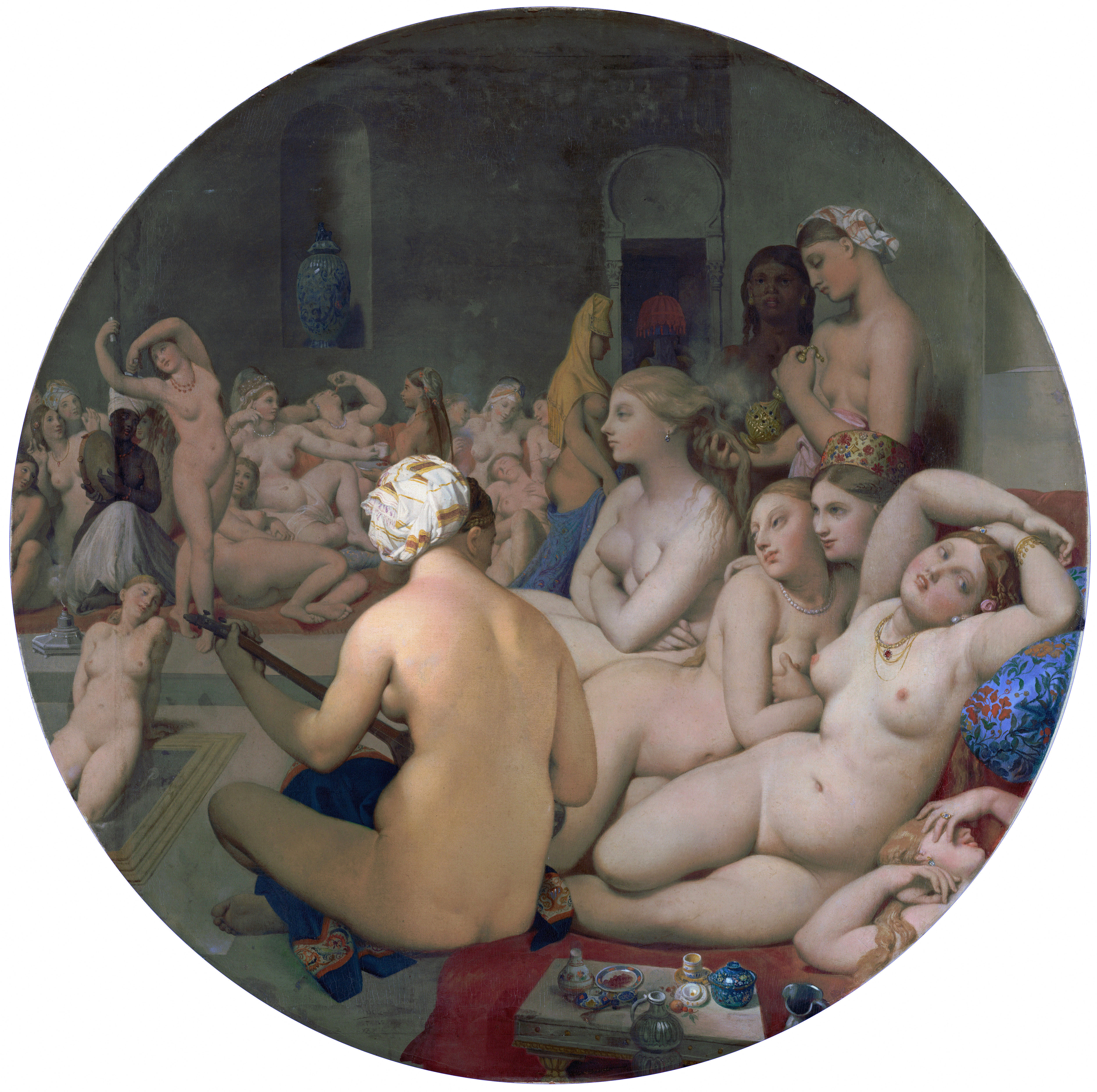
The Turkish Bath, Jean-Auguste-Dominique Ingres, 1862, oil on wood. The sensual arabesques of the female nude interested Chassériau and his teacher Ingres.

== Exoticism ==
The choice of an Old Testament story about a young woman in a harem freed Chassériau to take advantage of Orientalist and Romantic elements. The presence of Asian figures and sumptuous jewelry serves to further eroticize Esther's figure. Having previously painted a Birth of Venus and a Susanna and the Elders, Chassériau found another theme which permitted a frankly sexual presentation of the female body.

The painting was not fully understood when first exhibited at the Paris Salon of 1842. If the critics recognized an insipidness in Esther's expression—one journalist complained "But why that elongated figure, those wild eyes, that savage look? There is no soul under that face..."—they failed to properly appreciate the originality of a biblical story re-imagined in an erotic, Romantic fashion. The painting would later inspire painters such as François-Léon Benouville and Gustave Moreau.

The Toilette of Esther was bequeathed to the Louvre in 1934 by Baron Arthur Chassériau, a distant relative of the artist, as part of a donation that included most of the artist's work in his possession.
