= Christ in the Garden of Olives (Chassériau) =

Painting by Théodore Chassériau

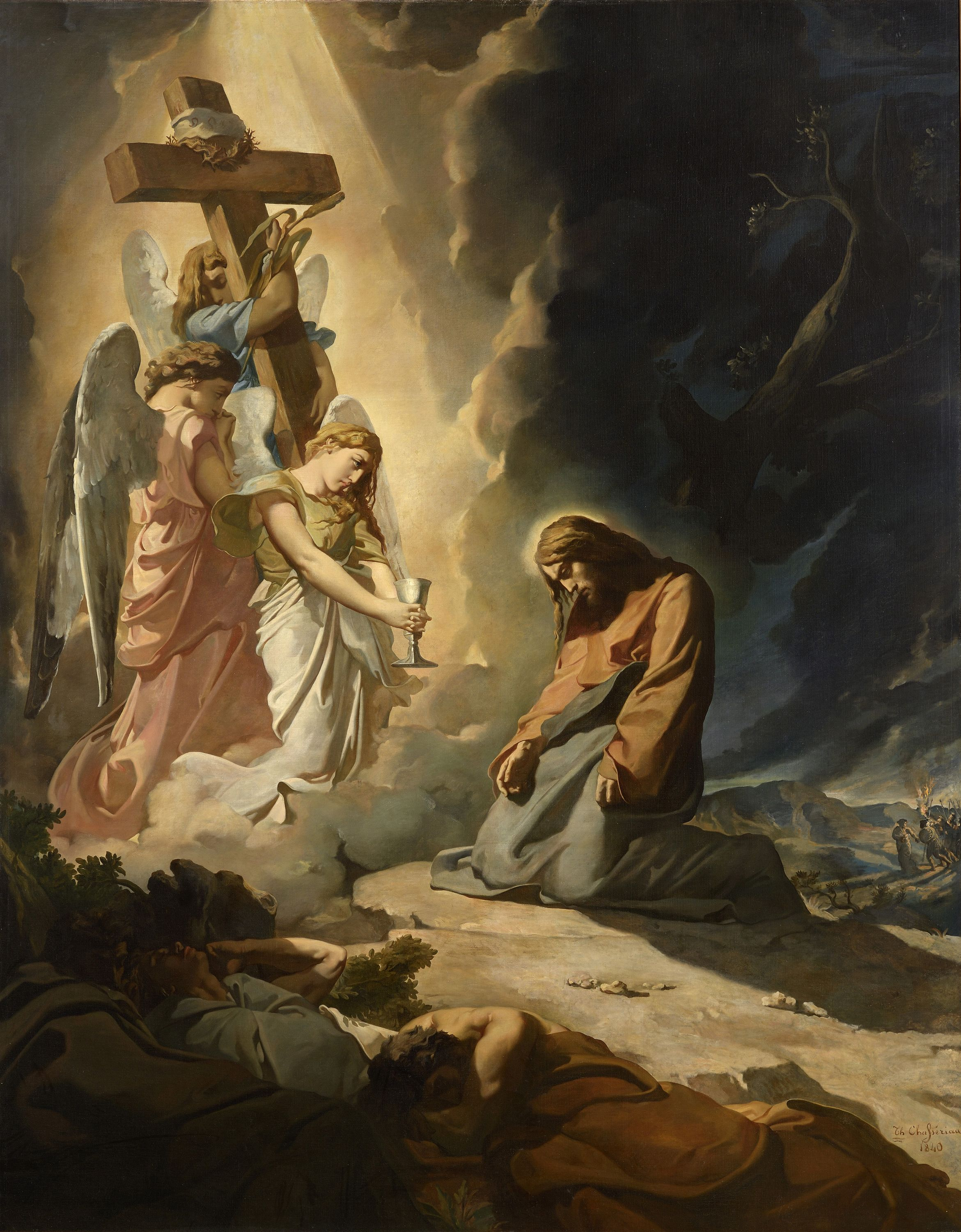
- Artist: Théodore Chassériau
- Year: 1840
- Medium: oil on canvas
- Dimensions: 452 cm × 357 cm (178 in × 141 in)
- Location: Museum of Fine Arts of Lyon; Lyon

Christ in the Garden of Olives is an oil on canvas painting created in 1840 by French painter Théodore Chassériau. It was executed following a commission from the Ministry of the Interior. The large format painting was presented at the Salon of 1840 at the Louvre in Paris. After a transfer from the church of Saint-Jean-d'Angély, in Charente-Maritime, it was moved to the Museum of Fine Arts of Lyon.

== Description and analysis ==
The work depicts the Christian iconographic subject of the Agony of Jesus in the Garden of Olives. In this painting, Jesus Christ is accompanied by three apostles: Peter, John and James the Greater. After praying three times to God on Mount Gethsemane, Jesus receives, from three angels, the chalice and the symbols of the Passion of Christ. In the background, Roman soldiers are shown with Judas leading them to Christ.

Chassérieu had been a disciple of neoclassical master Jean-Auguste-Dominique Ingres but was also an admirer of the romanticism of Eugène Delacroix. Not surprisingly, this work is influenced by both styles. Ingres' influence appears mixed with the dramaturgy of the moment. The traditional colors of Christ are shown in a chiaroscuro. Few geometric shapes and the aerial perspective demonstrate the influence of the romantic style.
