= Susanna and the Elders (Chassériau) =

Painting by Théodore Chassériau

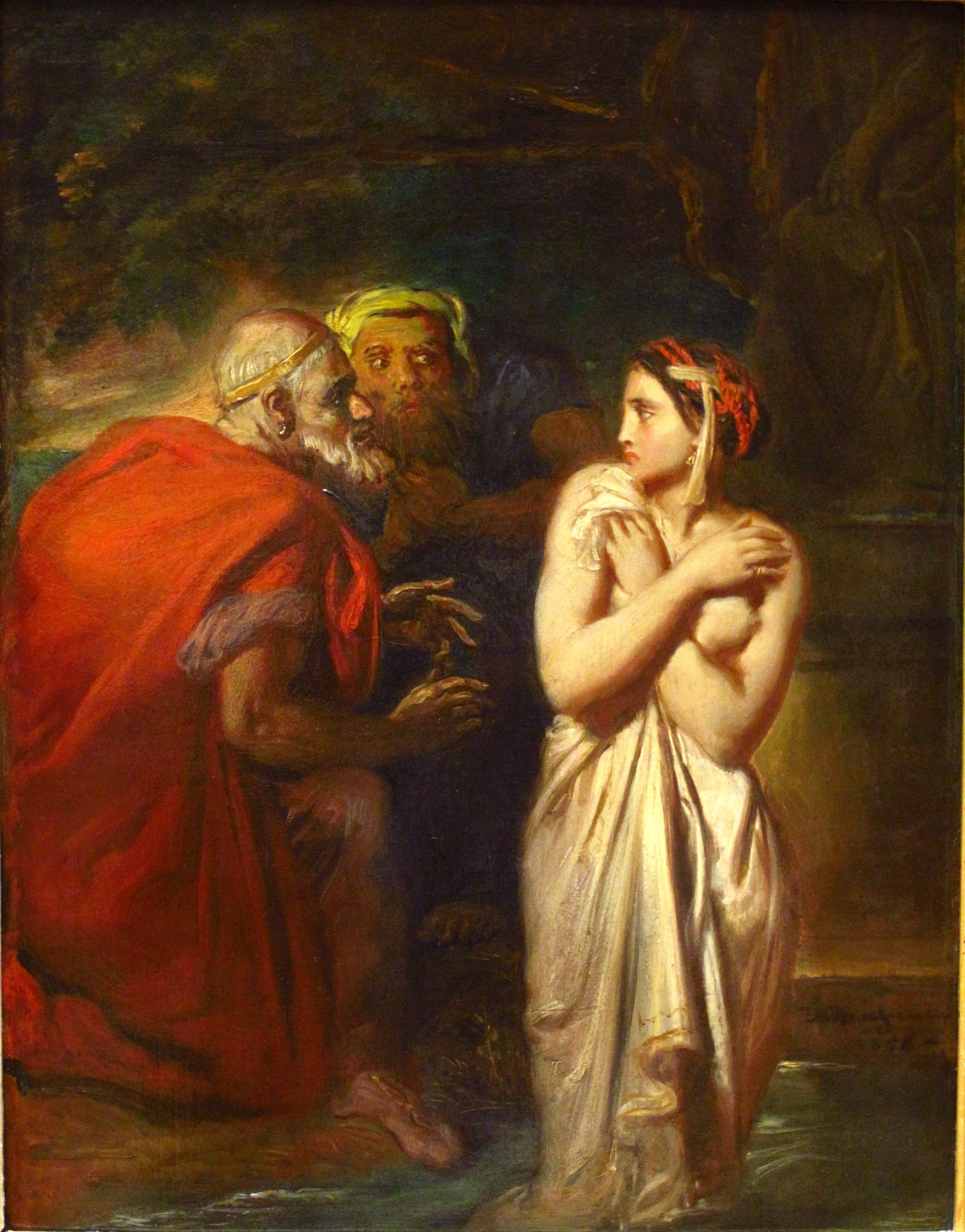
- Artist: Théodore Chassériau
- Year: 1856
- Type: Oil on panel, history painting
- Dimensions: 40 cm × 31.5 cm (16 in × 12.4 in)
- Location: Louvre; Paris

Susanna and the Elders (French: Suzanne et les vieillards) is an oil painting on panel by the French artist Théodore Chassériau, from 1856. Combining religious and nude art it depicts the biblical scene of Susanna and the Elders, a popular subject in European Art.

This was one of the final works by Chassériau, a member of the Romantic movement, who died in October 1856 from ill health at the age of age thirty seven. The painting is in the collection of the Louvre, in Paris,. having been acquired by the French state in 1934.

== Bibliography ==
- Sandoz, Marc Théodore Chassériau, 1819-1856: Catalogue raisonné des peintures et estampes. 1974.
