= Banquo's Ghost =

Painting by Théodore Chassériau

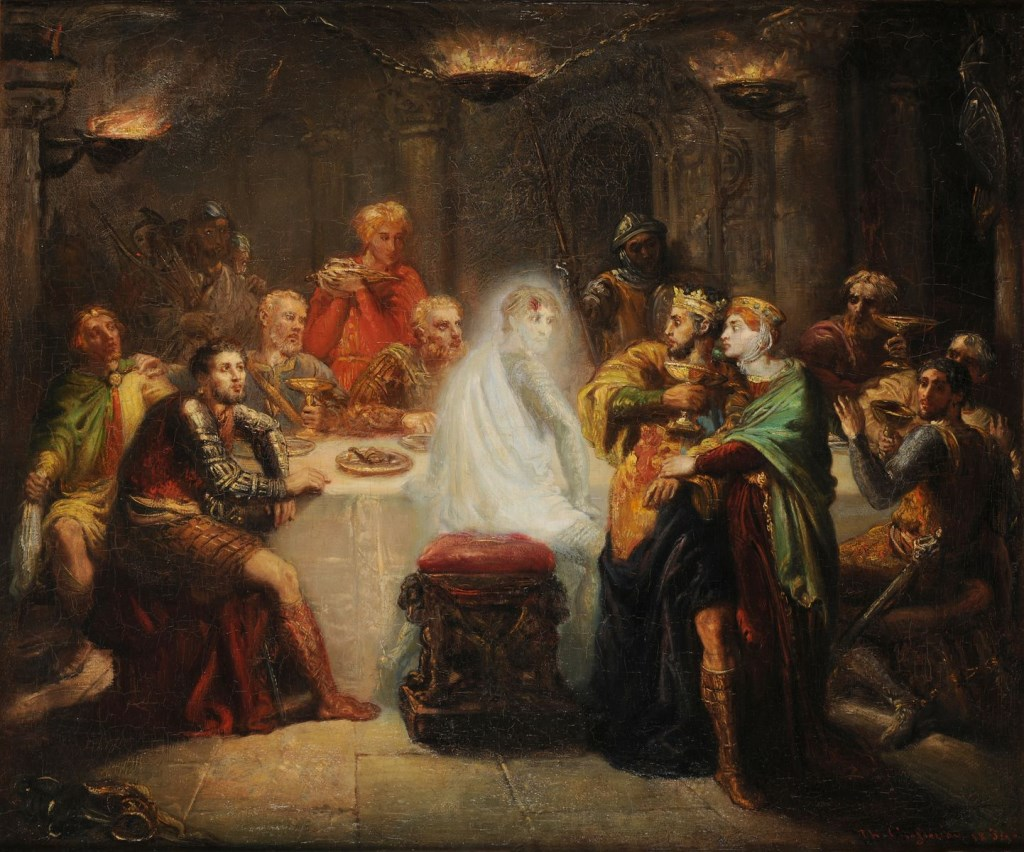
- Artist: Théodore Chassériau
- Year: 1854
- Type: Oil on panel, history painting
- Dimensions: 53.8 cm × 65.3 cm (21.2 in × 25.7 in)
- Location: Museum of Fine Arts, Reims

Banquo's Ghost (French: Le spectre de Banquo) is an 1854 oil painting by the French Romantic artist Théodore Chassériau. The painting features a scene from William Shakespeare's tragedy Macbeth.

The painting features the moment in Act 3 Scene 4 when Macbeth is confronted by the appearance of the ghost of Banquo during a nightime banquet.

Chassériau submitted the work for the Salon of 1855 but it was rejected. It was acquired in 1939 by the Museum of Fine Arts in Reims.

== Bibliography ==
- Martineau, Jane. Shakespeare in Art. Dulwich Picture Gallery, 2003.
- Sandoz, Marc Théodore Chassériau, 1819-1856: Catalogue raisonné des peintures et estampes. 1974.
