= Théodore Chassériau =

French romantic painter (1819–1856)

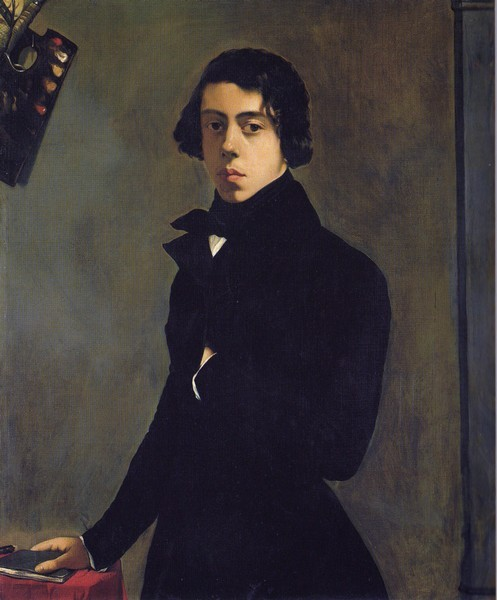
- A self-portrait of Chassériau painted at the age of 16
- Born: September 20, 1819; El Limón, Samaná, Santo Domingo
- Died: October 8, 1856 (aged 37); Paris, France
- Citizenship: French
- Education: Jean-Auguste-Dominique Ingres
- Movement: Romanticism; Orientalism

Théodore Chassériau (French pronunciation: [teɔdɔʁ ʃaseʁjo]; Spanish: Teodoro Chasseriau; September 20, 1819 – October 8, 1856) was a Dominican-born French Romantic painter noted for his portraits, historical and religious paintings, allegorical murals, and Orientalist images inspired by his travels to Algeria. Early in his career he painted in a Neoclassical style close to that of his teacher Jean-Auguste-Dominique Ingres, but in his later works he was strongly influenced by the Romantic style of Eugène Delacroix. He was a prolific draftsman, and made a suite of prints to illustrate Shakespeare's Othello. The portrait he painted at the age of 15 of Prosper Marilhat makes Chassériau the youngest painter exhibited at the Louvre museum.

== Life and work ==
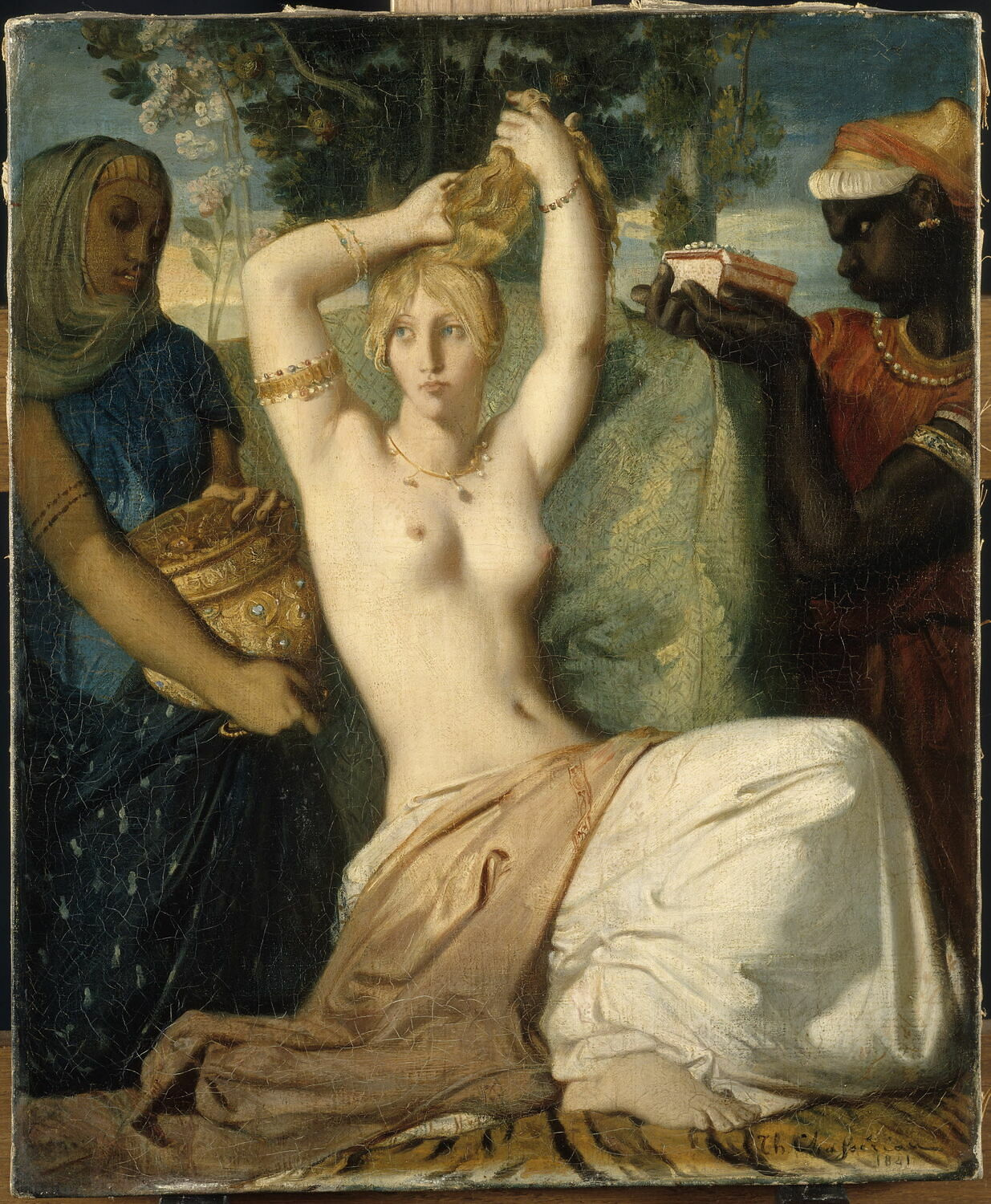
The Toilette of Esther, 1841, oil on canvas, 45.5 x 35.5 cm, Paris, Louvre

Chassériau was born in El Limón, Samaná, in the Spanish colony of Santo Domingo (now the Dominican Republic). His father Benoît Chassériau was a French adventurer who had arrived in Santo Domingo in 1802 to take an administrative position in what was until 1808 a French colony. Theodore's mother, Marie Madeleine Couret de la Blagnière, was the daughter of a mulatto landowner born in Saint-Domingue (now Haiti). In December 1820 the family left Santo Domingo for Paris, where the young Chassériau soon showed precocious drawing skill. He was accepted into the studio of Jean-Auguste-Dominique Ingres in 1830, at the age of eleven, and became the favorite pupil of the great classicist, who regarded him as his truest disciple. (An account that may be apocryphal has Ingres declaring "Come, gentlemen, come see, this child will be the Napoleon of painting.")

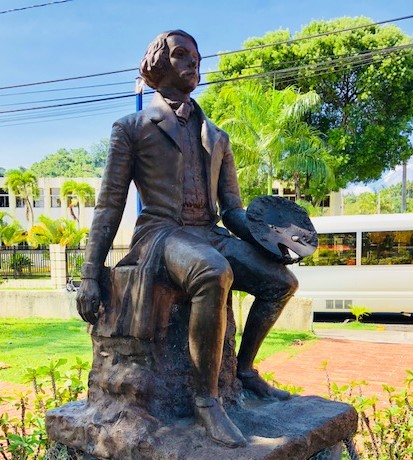
Statue of painter Théodore Chassériau located in Santa Bárbara de Samaná

After Ingres left Paris in 1834 to become director of the French Academy in Rome, Chassériau fell under the influence of Eugène Delacroix, whose brand of painterly colorism was anathema to Ingres. Chassériau first exhibited at the Paris Salon of 1836, and was awarded a third-place medal in the category of history painting. In 1840 Chassériau travelled to Rome and met with Ingres, whose bitterness at the direction his student's work was taking led to a decisive break. While in Italy, Chassériau made landscape sketches and studied Renaissance frescoes.

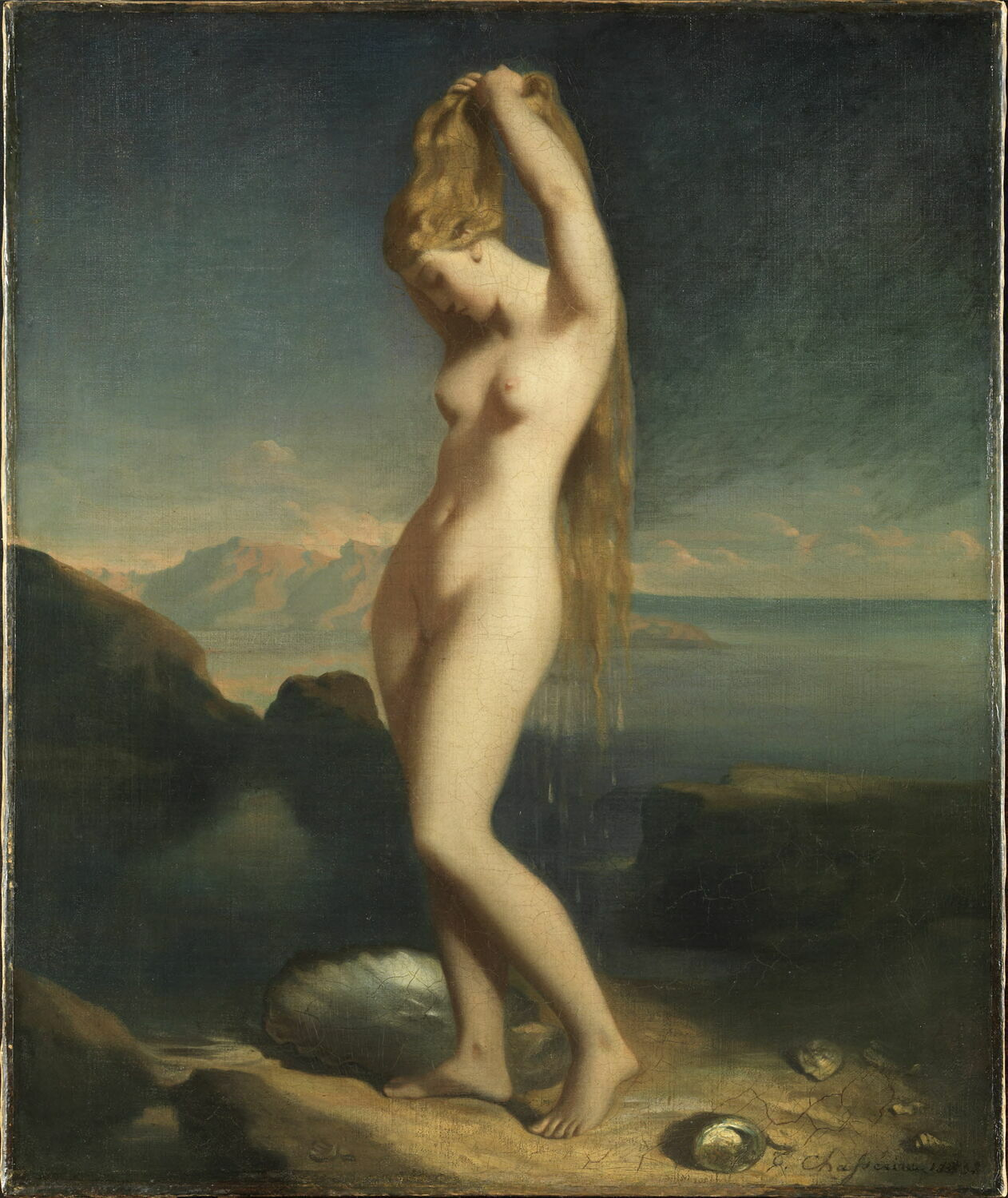
Venus Anadyomene, 1838, Paris, Louvre

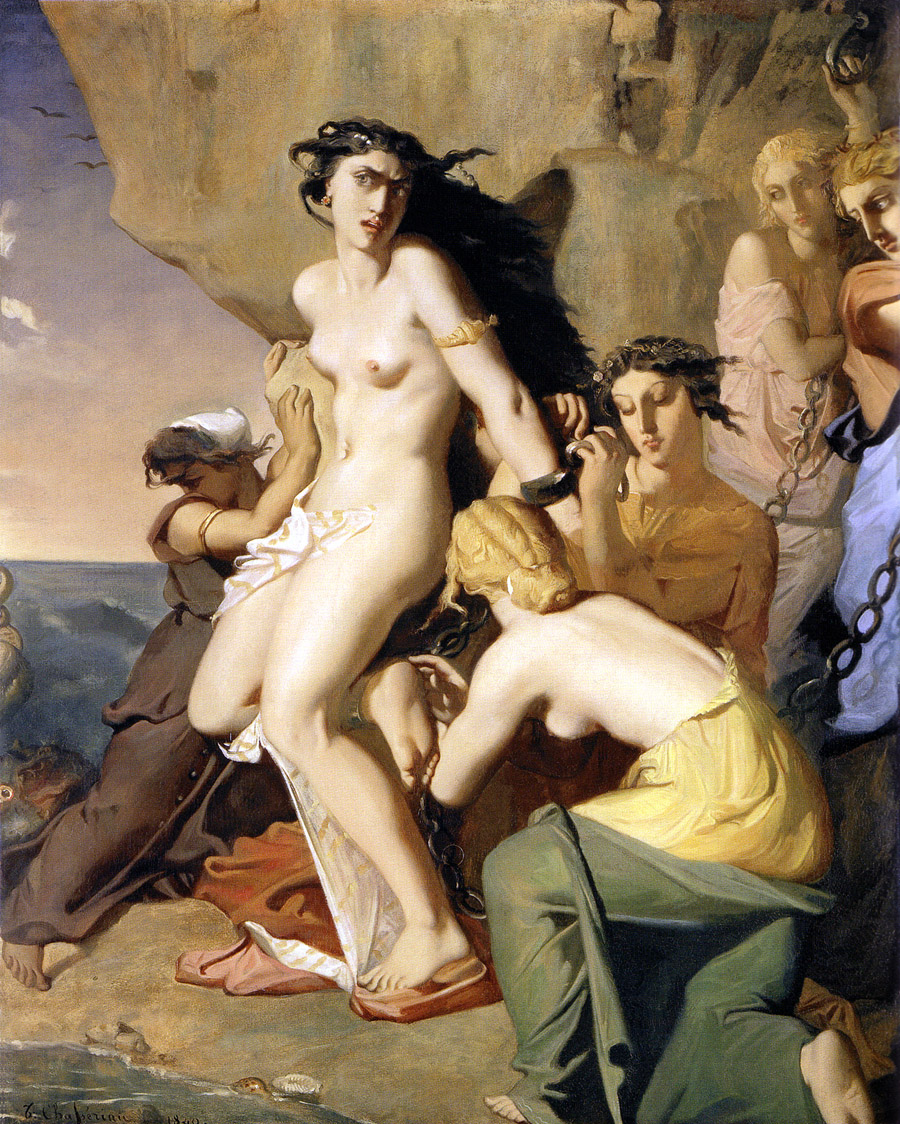
Andromeda Chained to the Rock by the Nereids, 1840, Paris, Louvre

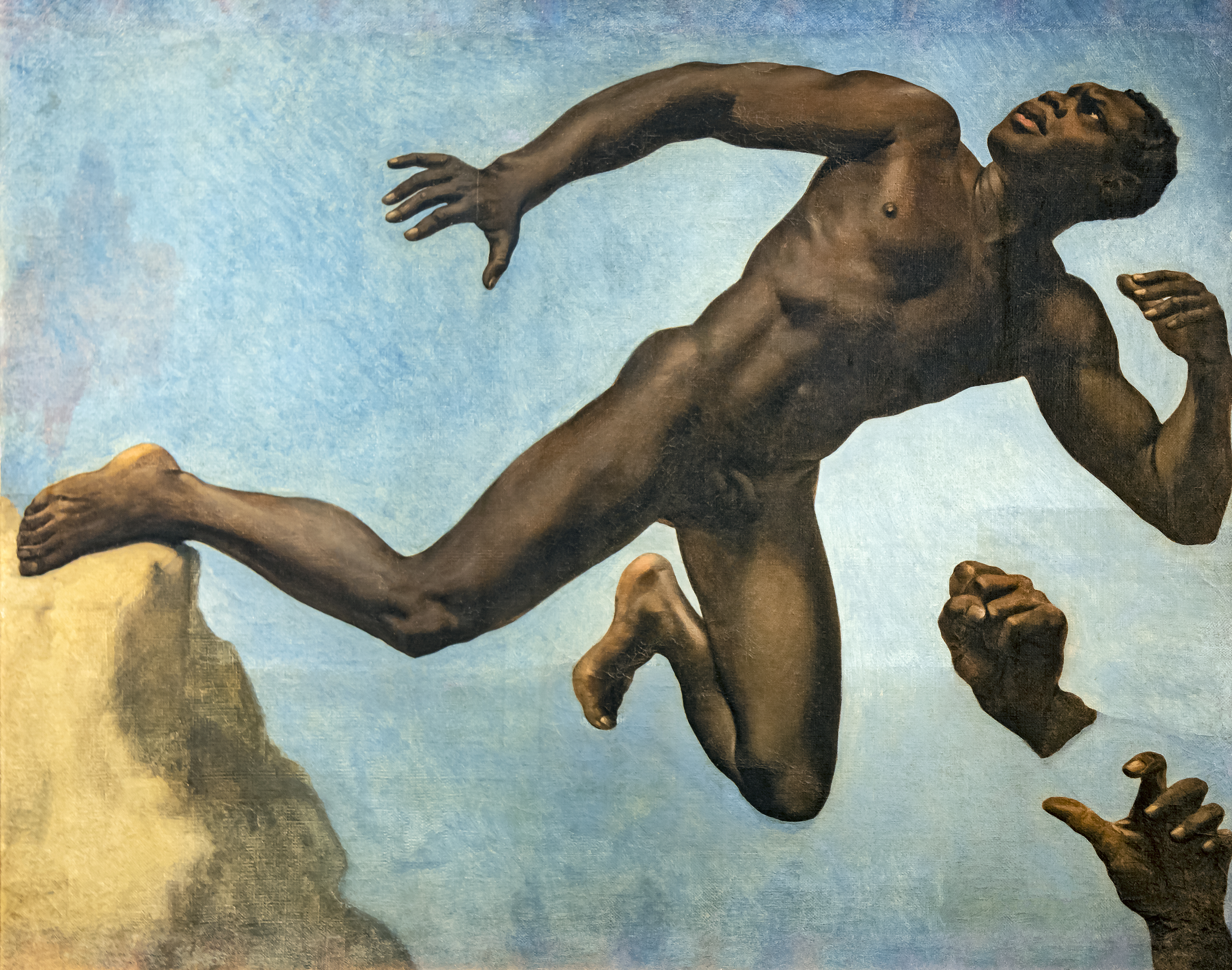
Study of a Man (1832) - Musée de Montauban

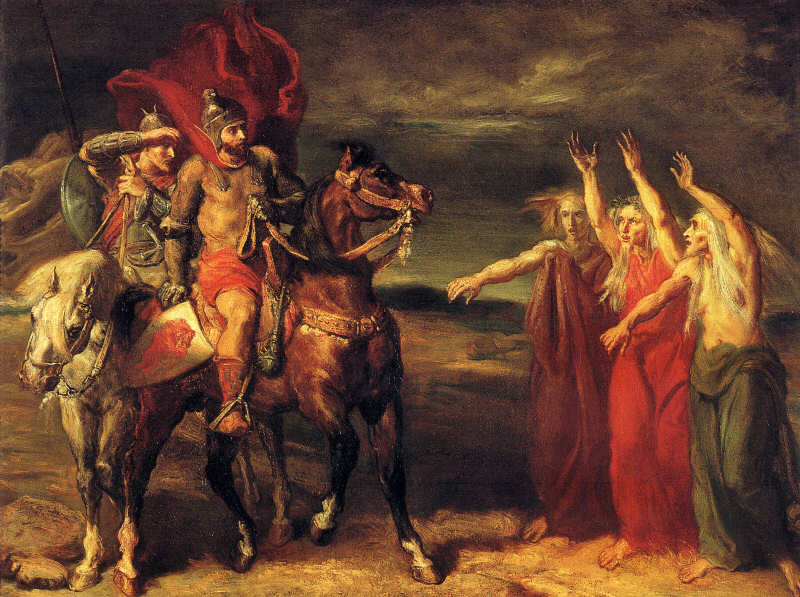
Macbeth and the Three Witches 1855. An example of one of Chassériau's many works inspired by Shakespeare

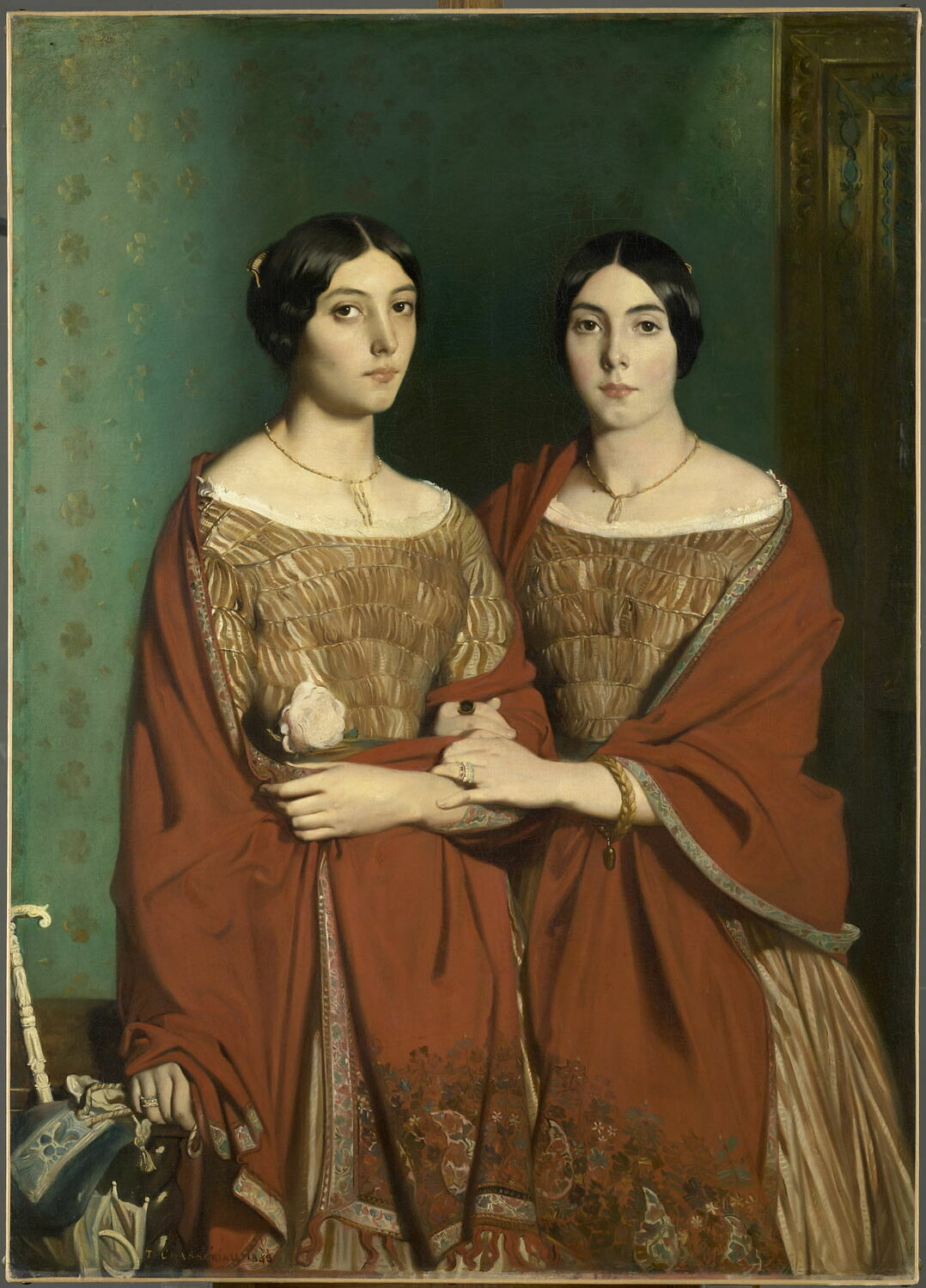
The Two Sisters, 1843, Paris, Louvre

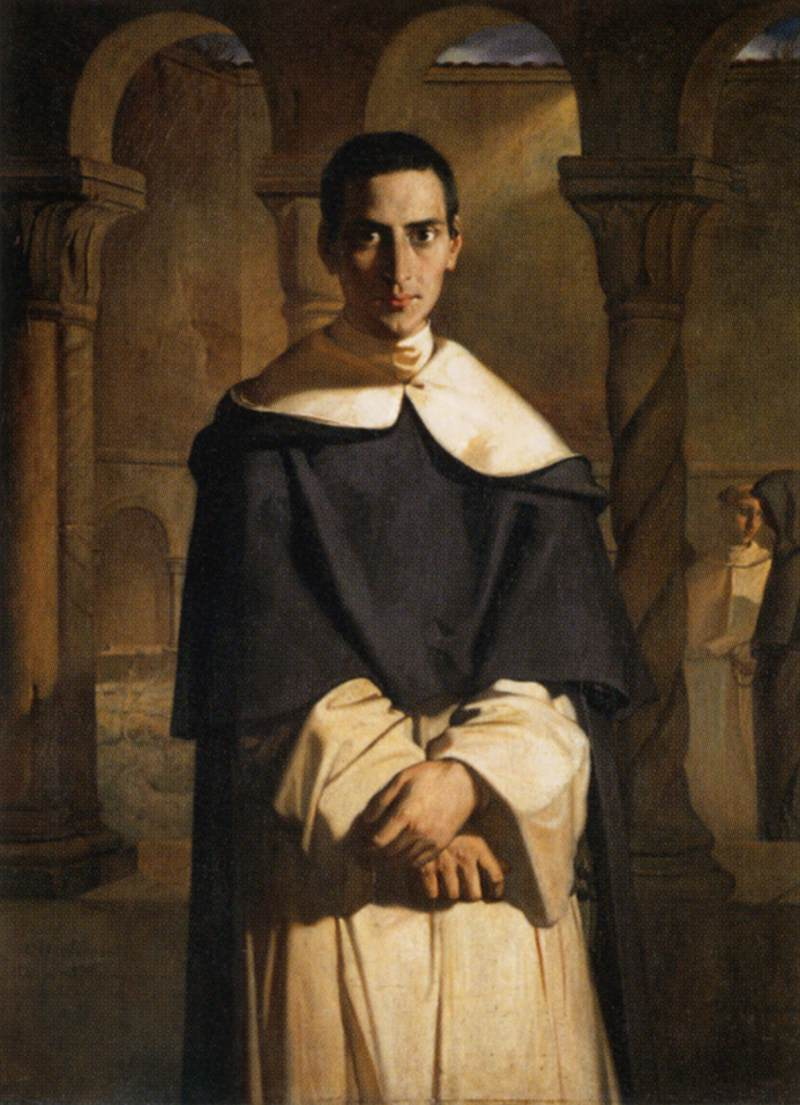
Portrait of Dominique Lacordaire, 1840, Paris, Louvre

Among the chief works of his early maturity are Susanna and the Elders and Venus Anadyomene (both 1839), Diana Surprised by Actaeon (1840), Andromeda Chained to the Rock by the Nereids (1840), and The Toilette of Esther (1841), all of which reveal a very personal ideal in depicting the female nude. Chassériau's major religious paintings from these years, Christ in the Garden of Olives (a subject he treated in 1840 and again in 1844) and The Descent from the Cross (1842), received mixed reviews from the critics; among the artist's champions was Théophile Gautier. In 1843, Chassériau painted murals depicting the life of Saint Mary of Egypt in the Church of Saint-Merri in Paris, the first of several commissions he received to decorate public buildings in Paris.

Portraits from this period include the Portrait of the Reverend Father Dominique Lacordaire, of the Order of the Predicant Friars (1840), and The Two Sisters (1843), which depicts Chassériau's sisters Adèle and Aline.

Throughout his life he was a prolific draftsman; his many portrait drawings executed with a finely pointed graphite pencil are close in style to those of Ingres. He also created a body of 29 prints, including a group of eighteen etchings of subjects from Shakespeare's Othello in 1844.

He exhibited the colossal portrait Ali-Ben-Hamet, Caliph of Constantine and Chief of the Haractas, Followed by his Escort in the Salon of 1845, where it received equivocal reviews. In 1846, Chassériau made his first trip to Algeria. From sketches made on this and subsequent trips he painted such subjects as Arab Chiefs Visiting Their Vassals and Jewish Women on a Balcony (both 1849, now in the Louvre). A major late work, The Tepidarium (1853, in the Musée d'Orsay), depicts a large group of women drying themselves after bathing, in an architectural setting inspired by the artist's trip in 1840 to Pompeii. His most monumental work was his decoration of the grand staircase of the Cour des Comptes, commissioned by the state in 1844 and completed in 1848. He followed the example of Delacroix in executing this work in oil on plaster, rather than in fresco. This work was heavily damaged in May 1871 by a fire set during the Commune, and only fragments could be recovered; these are preserved in the Louvre.

After a period of ill health, exacerbated by his exhausting work on commissions for murals to decorate the Churches of Saint-Roch and Saint-Philippe-du-Roule, Chassériau died at the age of 37 in Paris, on October 8, 1856. He is buried in the Montmartre Cemetery.

== Technique and style ==
Chassériau's art has often been characterized as an attempt to reconcile the classicism of Ingres with the romanticism of Delacroix. In composing his narrative paintings, his concern for the decorative arrangement of figures and the creation of a mood took precedence over narrative coherence. His preferred method of working was to study his model carefully and then draw from memory. He favored the serpentine pose, especially for his female figures. Art historian Jonathan P. Ribner calls "the inclined neck and bent knee" Chassériau's "signature motif" and says that "his command of foreshortening and three-dimensional composition remained uneven to the end, and this limitation is reflected in the tenacity of his ... inclination toward flattened, stylized poses." According to Léon Rosenthal, Chassériau was "much less concerned with bringing heroes to life or developing characters than desirous of producing subtle and infinitely rich impressions suggested to him by the themes he chooses".

== Legacy ==
His work had a significant impact on the style of Puvis de Chavannes and Gustave Moreau, and—through those artists' influence—reverberations in the work of Paul Gauguin and Henri Matisse. There is in Paris a Society for the painter: Association des Amis de Théodore Chassériau.

Works of Chassériau are in the Musée du Louvre where a room is dedicated to him, in the Musée d'Orsay, and in the Musée de Versailles. Collections in the United States holding works by Théodore Chassériau include the Metropolitan Museum of Art, New York, the Fogg Art Museum of Harvard University, the National Gallery of Art of Washington, D.C., the Detroit Institute of Arts, the Museum of the Art Rhode Island School of Design, The J. Paul Getty Museum and the Art Institute of Chicago.

== Exhibitions ==
- Théodore Chassériau: Parfum exotique, National Museum of Western Art of Tokyo, Japan, February 28 – May 28, 2017
- Théodore Chassériau: Obras sobre papel, Galerie nationale des beaux-arts de Santo Domingo and Centro cultural León de Santiago de los Caballeros, Dominican Republic, 2004
- Théodore Chassériau (1819–1856): A Different Romanticism, Metropolitan Museum of Art, New York (titled Théodore Chassériau (1819–1856): The Unknown Romantic), Galeries nationales du Grand Palais in Paris (France) and Musée des beaux-arts de Strasbourg (France), 2002
- Chassériau (1819–1856): exposition au profit de la Société des amis du Louvre, Galerie Daber, Paris, France, 1976
- Theodore Chassériau (1819–1856), Musée des beaux-arts de Poitiers, France, 1969
- Théodore Chassériau, Musée national des beaux-arts d'Alger, Algeria, 1936
- Retrospective Théodore Chassériau (1819–1856), Musée de l'Orangerie, Paris, France, 1933
- Aquarelles et dessins de Chasseriau (1819–1856), Galerie L. Dru, Paris, France, 1927
- Les Peintres orientalistes français - 4e exposition: Rétrospective Théodore Chassériau, Galerie Durand-Ruel, Paris, France, 1897

== Selected works ==
- Self-Portrait - Musée du Louvre
- Aline Chassériau - Musée du Louvre
- Battle of Arab Horsemen Around a Standard (1854) - Dallas Museum of Art
- The Caliph of Constantine, also known as Ali Ben-Hamet, Caliph of Constantine and Chief of the Haractas, Followed by his Escort
- Arab Chiefs Challenging each other to Single Combat under the Ramparts of a City
- Andromeda Chained to the Rock by the Nereids
- Arab Chiefs Visiting their Vassals
- Christ in the Garden of Olives
- The Descent from the Cross
- Diana Surprised by Actaeon
- Jewish Women on a Balcony
- Othello and Desdemona in Venice
- Portrait of the Father Dominique Lacordaire, of the Order of the Predicant Friars
- Susanna and the Elders
- Venus Anadyomene
- The Tepidarium
- The Toilette of Esther
- The Two Sisters

== Gallery ==
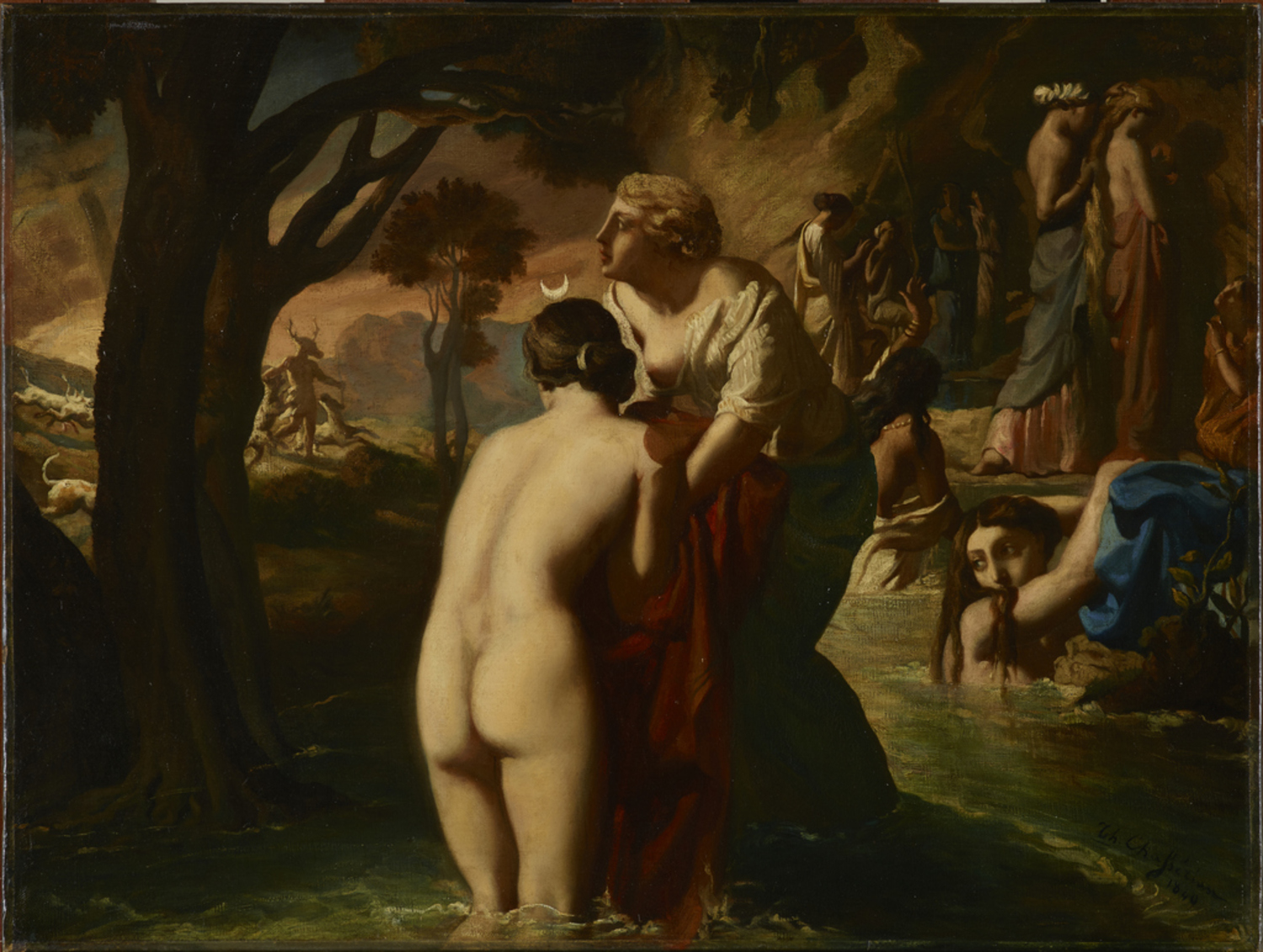
Diana Surprised by Actaeon, 1840

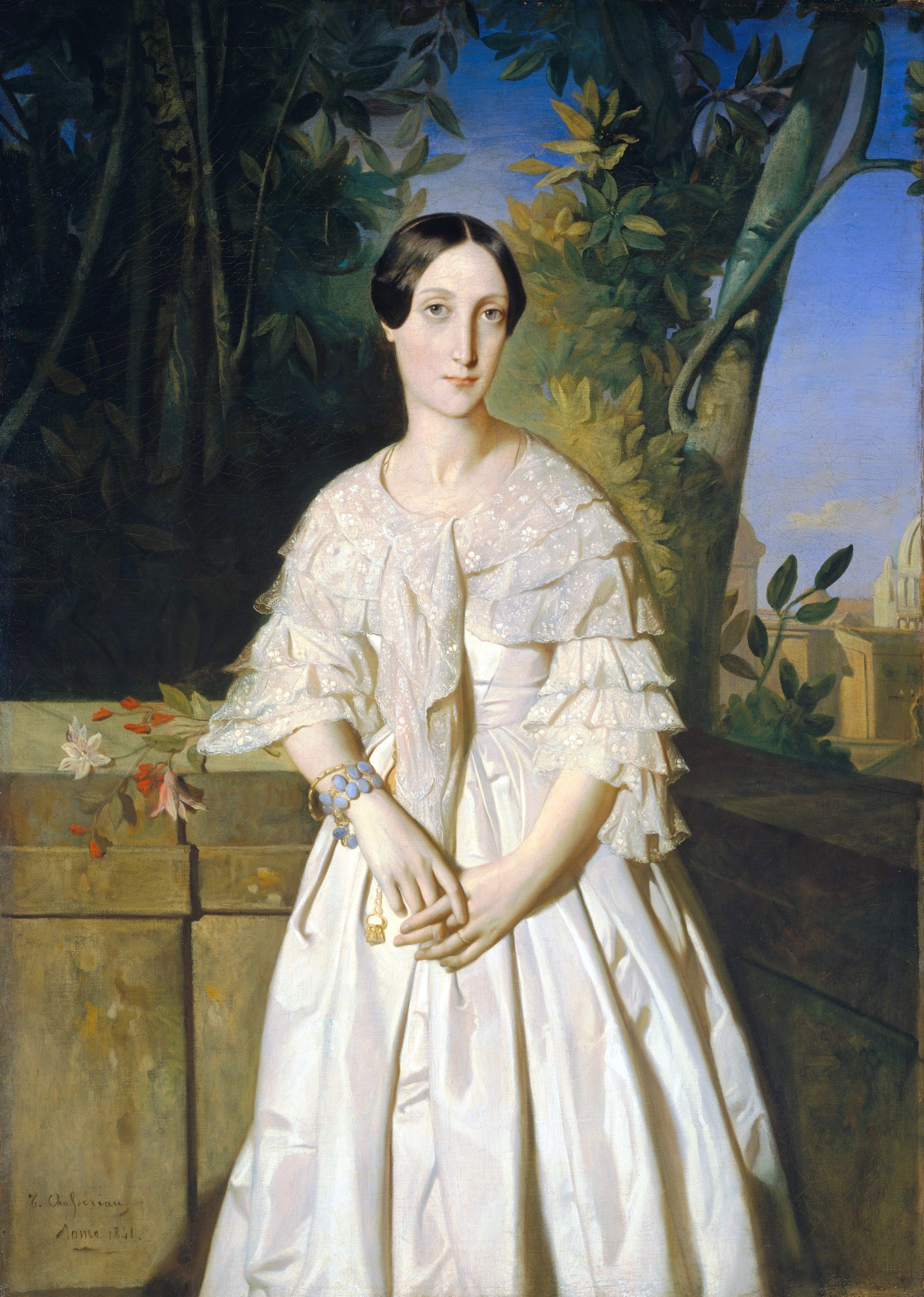
Portrait de la comtesse de La Tour Maubourg, 1841, Metropolitan Museum of Art, New York

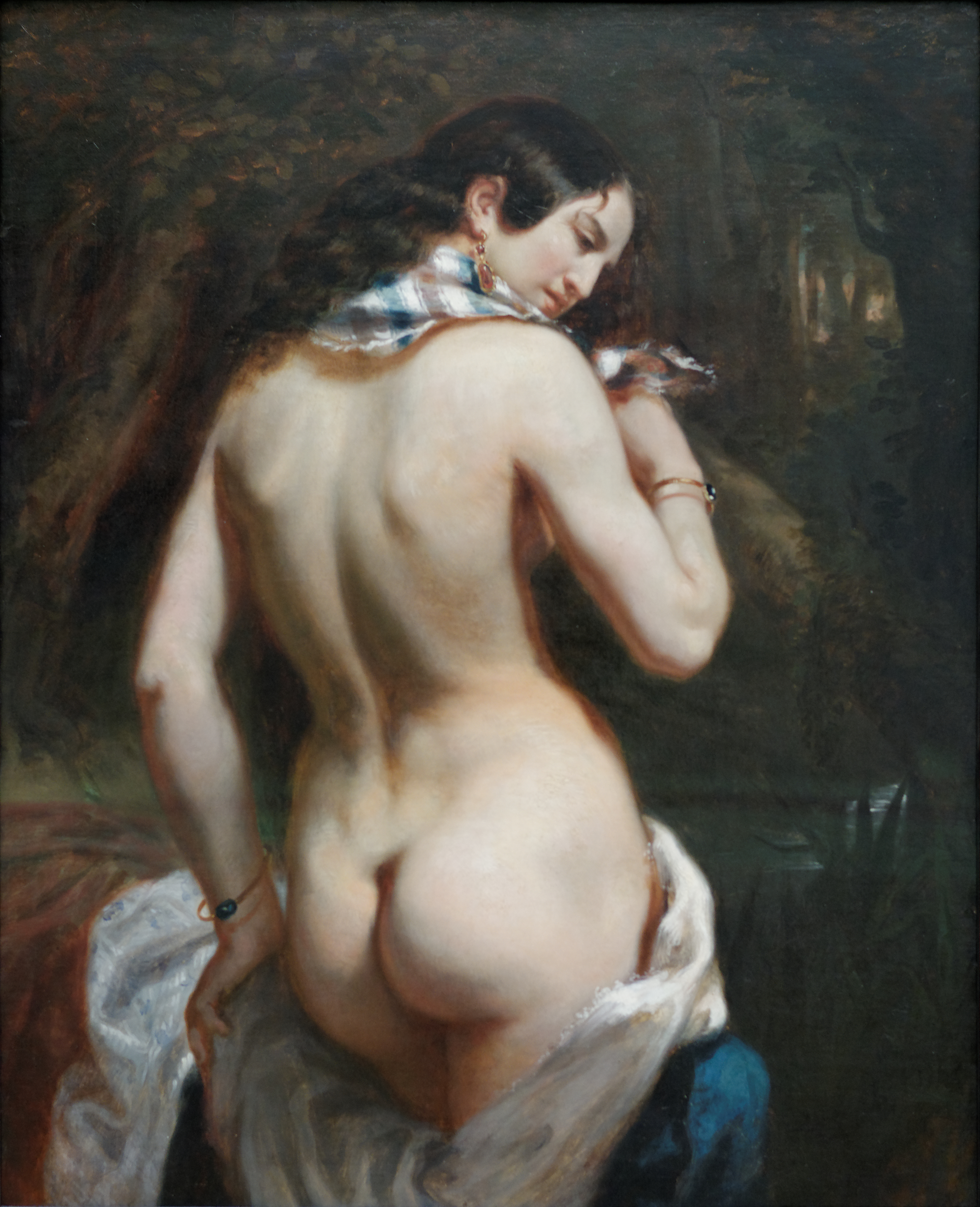
La baigneuse, 1842

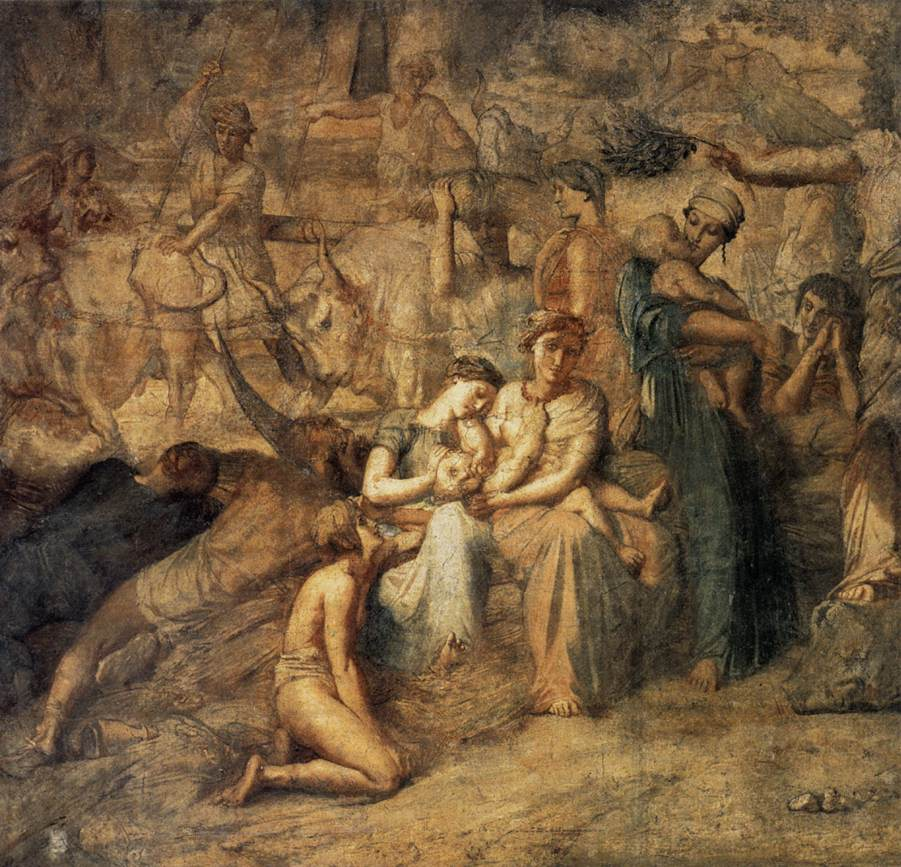
Peace, Protector of the Arts and of the Tilling of the Soil, 1844–1848, oil on plaster transferred to canvas. A surviving fragment of the Cour des Comptes decorations.

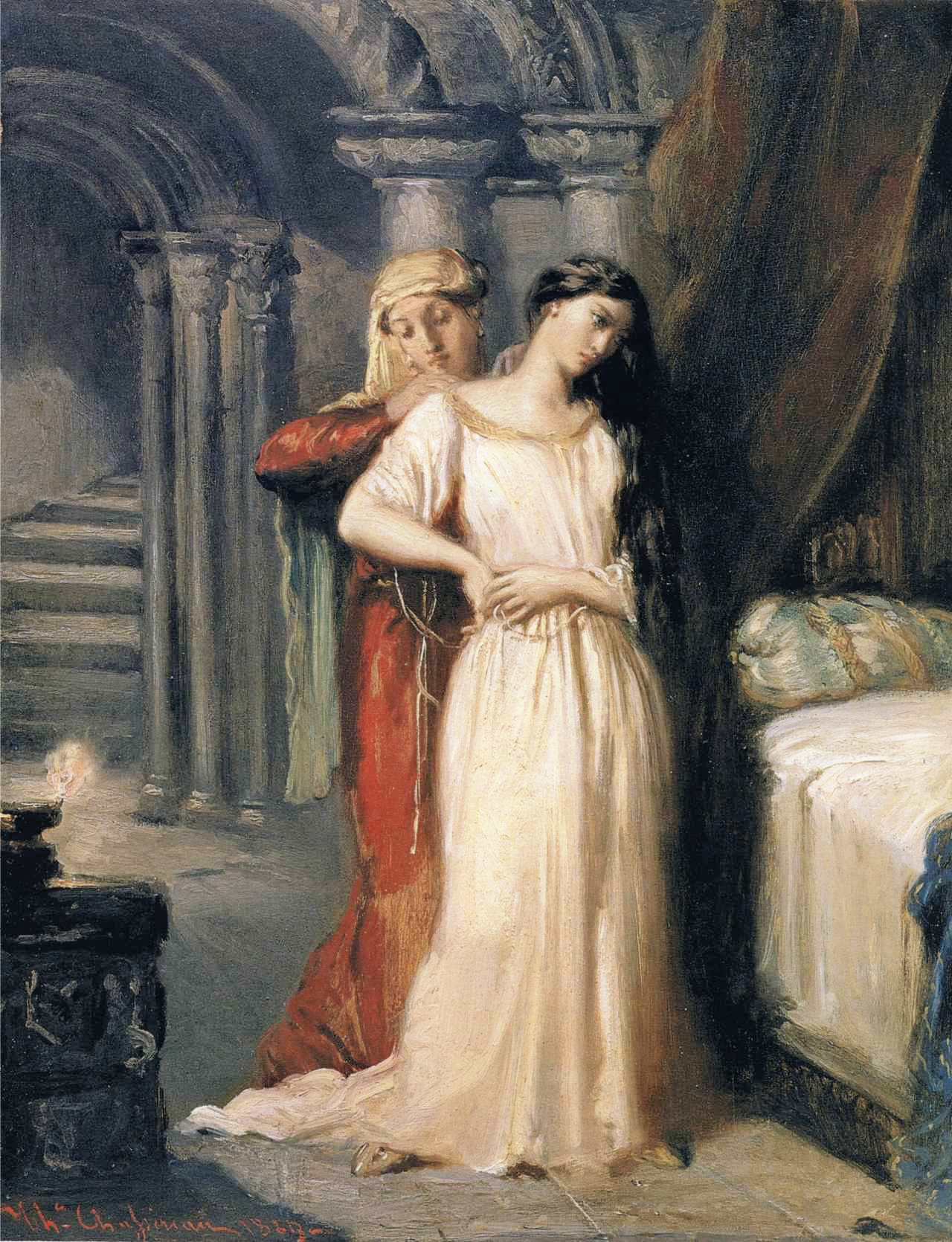
Desdemona Retiring to Bed, 1849

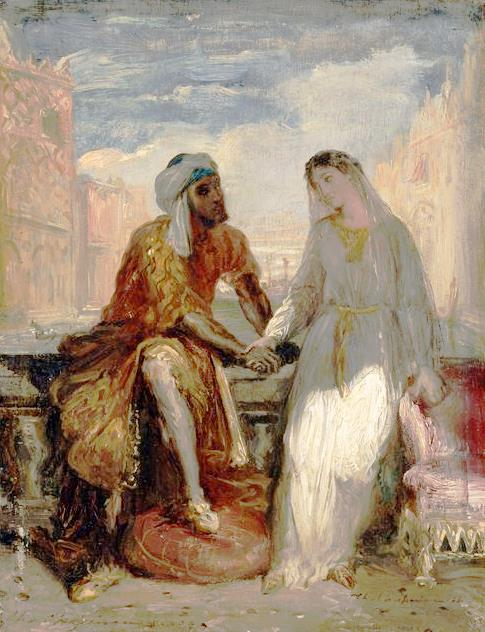
Othello and Desdemona in Venice, 1850, oil on wood, 25 x 20 cm, Louvre, Paris. Another work inspired by Shakespeare

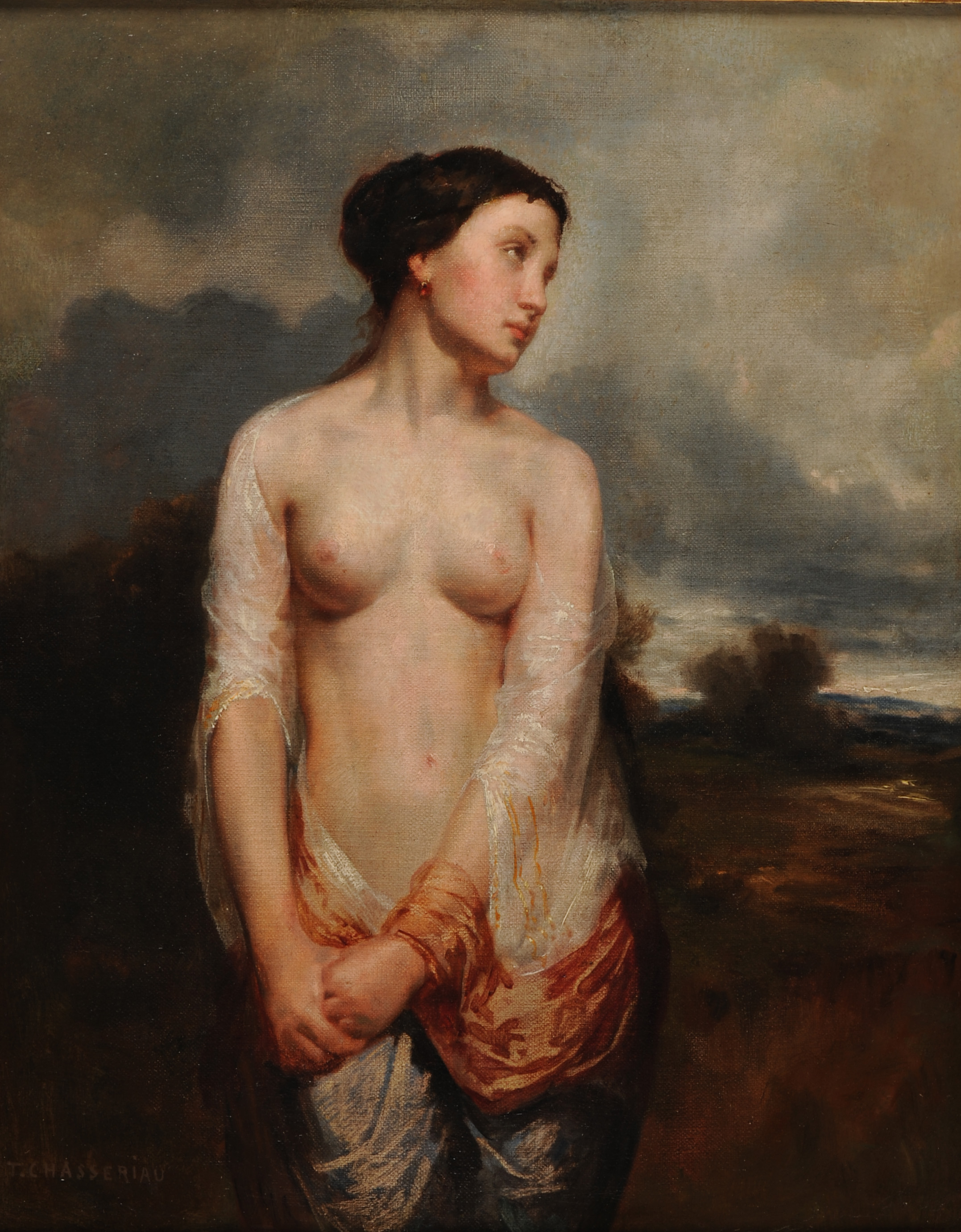
The Captive, c.1850

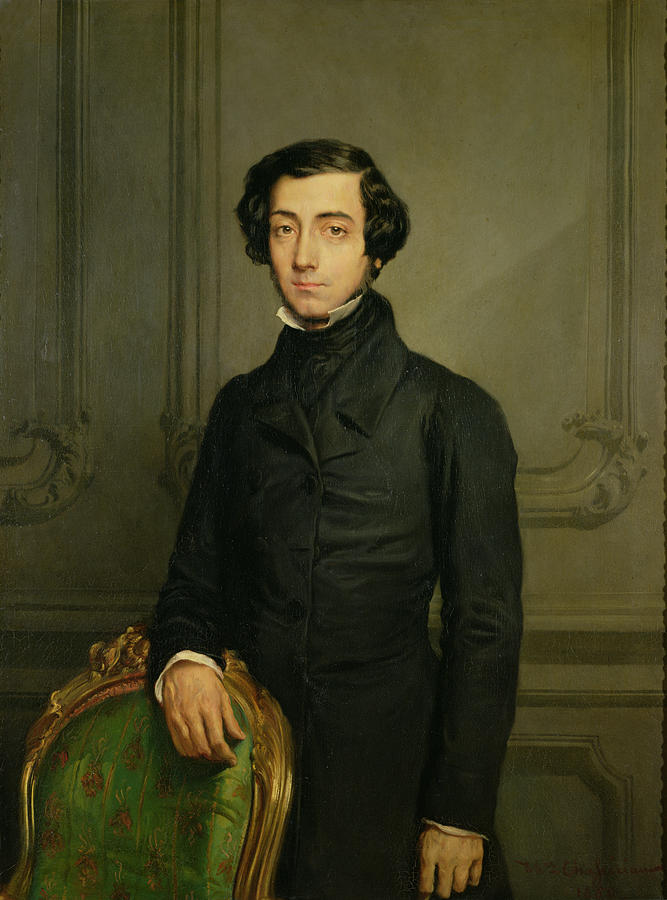
Portrait of Alexis de Tocqueville, 1850, Palace of Versailles

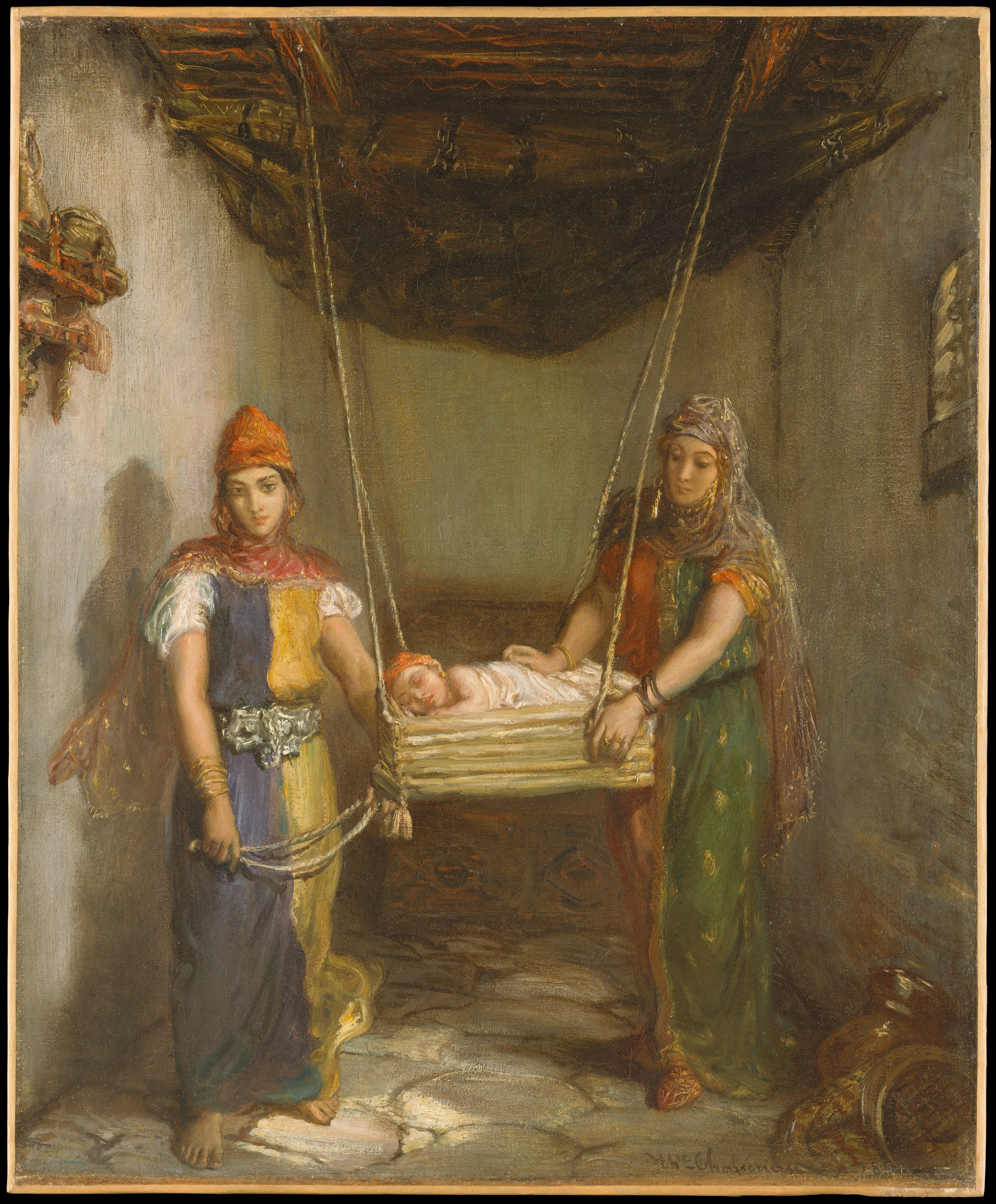
Scene in the Jewish Quarter of Constantine, 1851, Metropolitan Museum of Art, New York

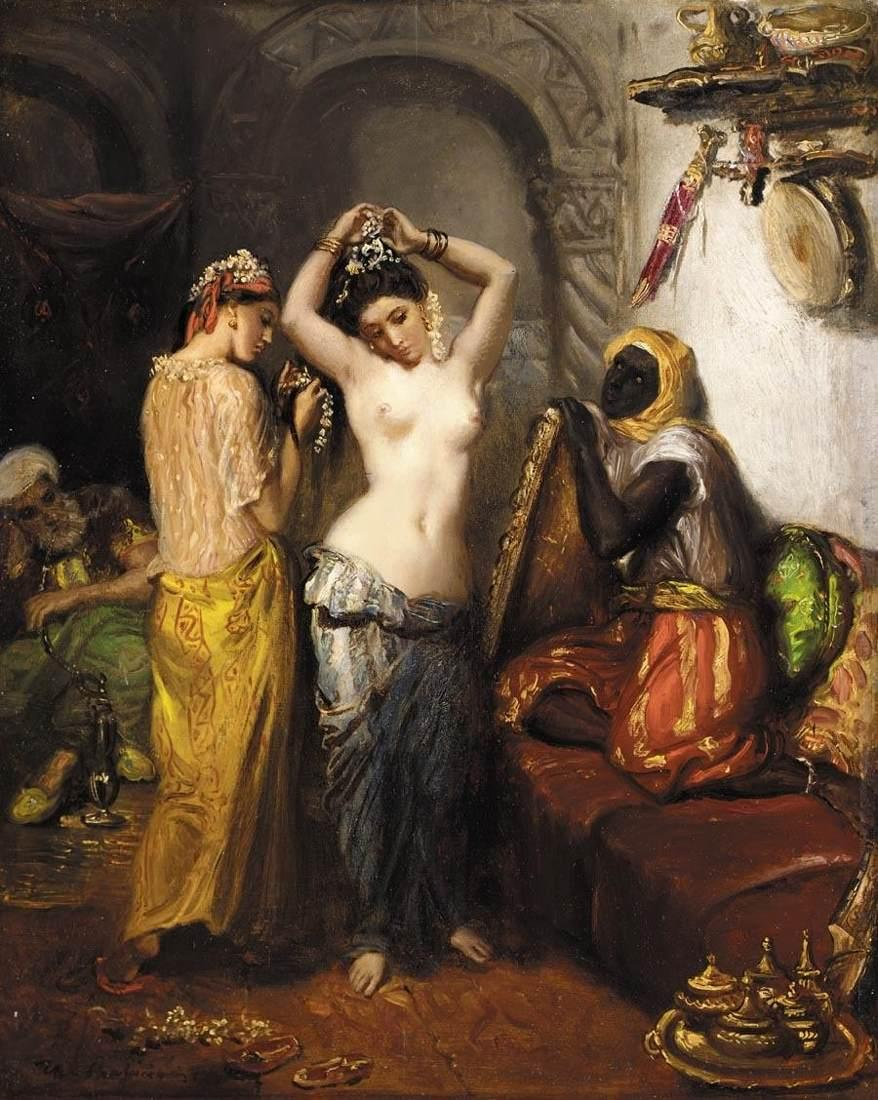
Orientalist Interior, ca. 1851–1852, oil on wood, 49 x 39 cm

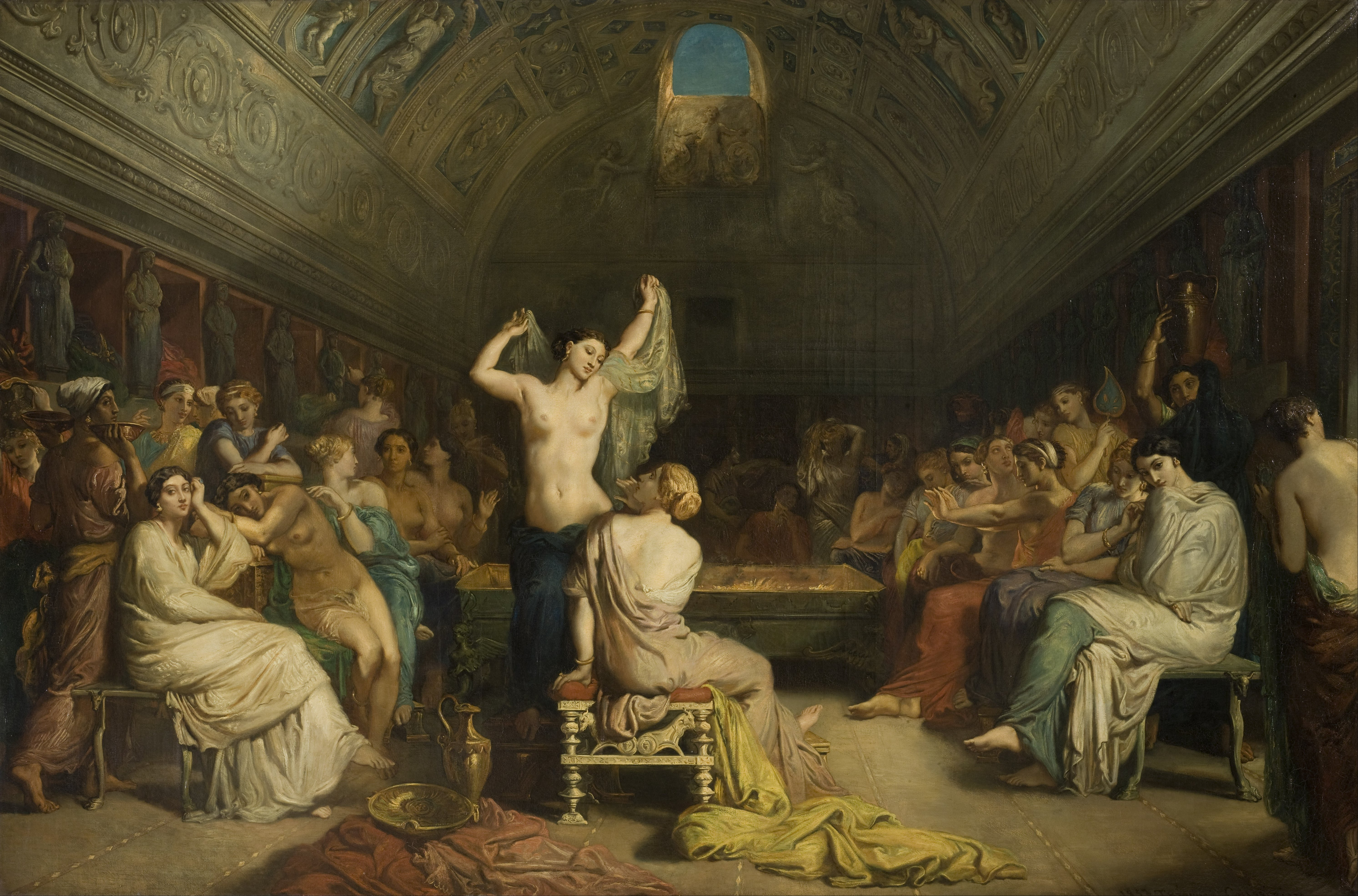
Tepidarium, 1853, oil on canvas, Musée d'Orsay

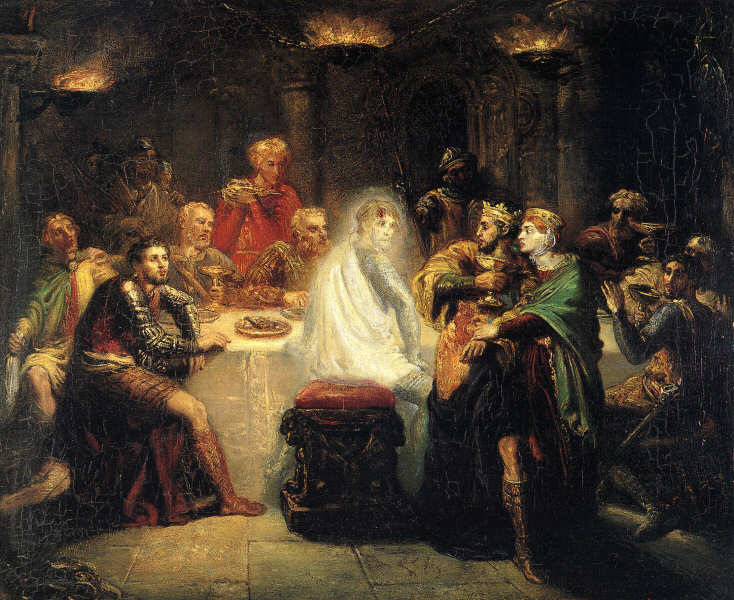
Banquo's Ghost, 1855, oil on canvas Museum of Fine Arts, Reims

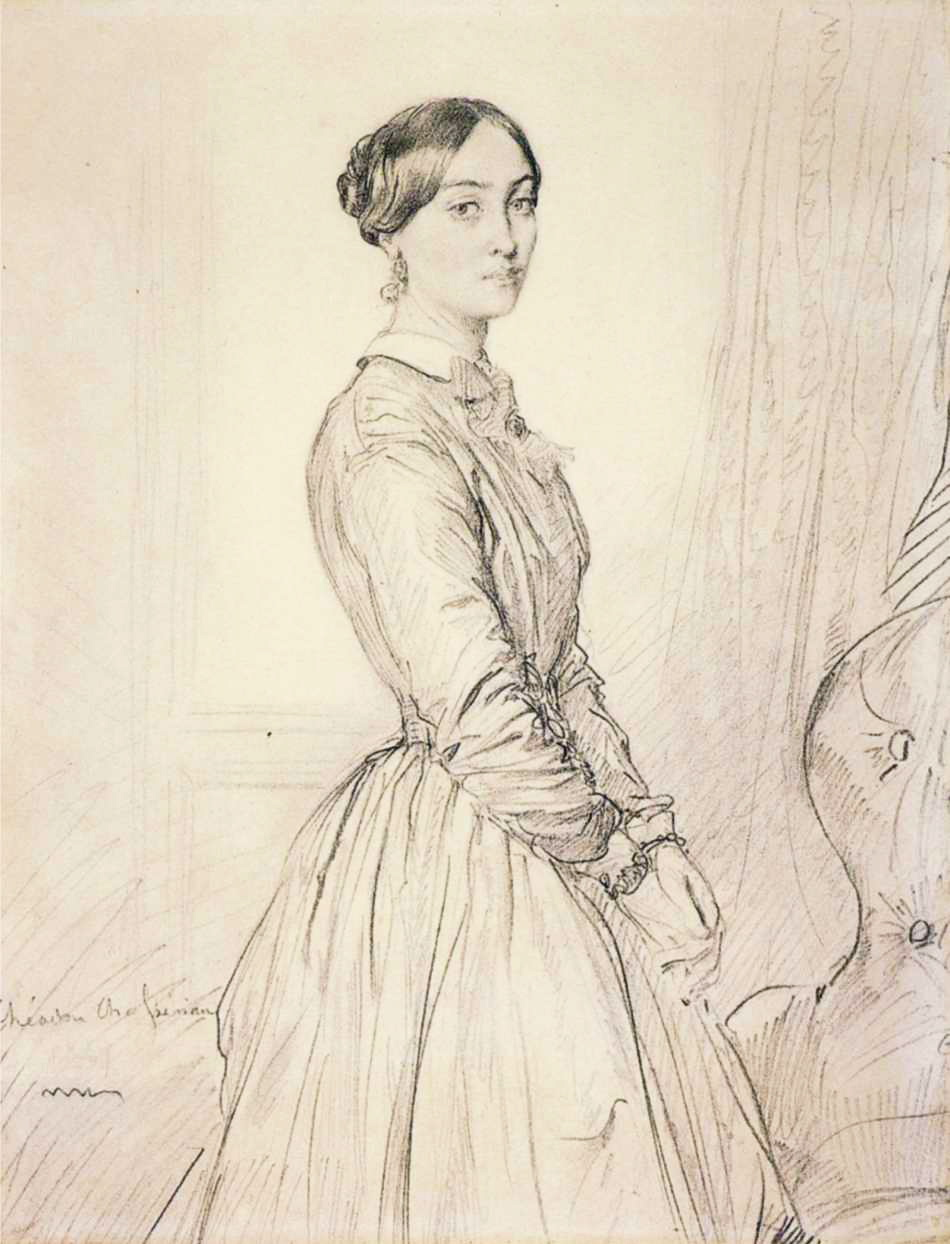
Portrait of Mme Borg de Balsan, 1847, pencil on paper, Philadelphia Museum of Art

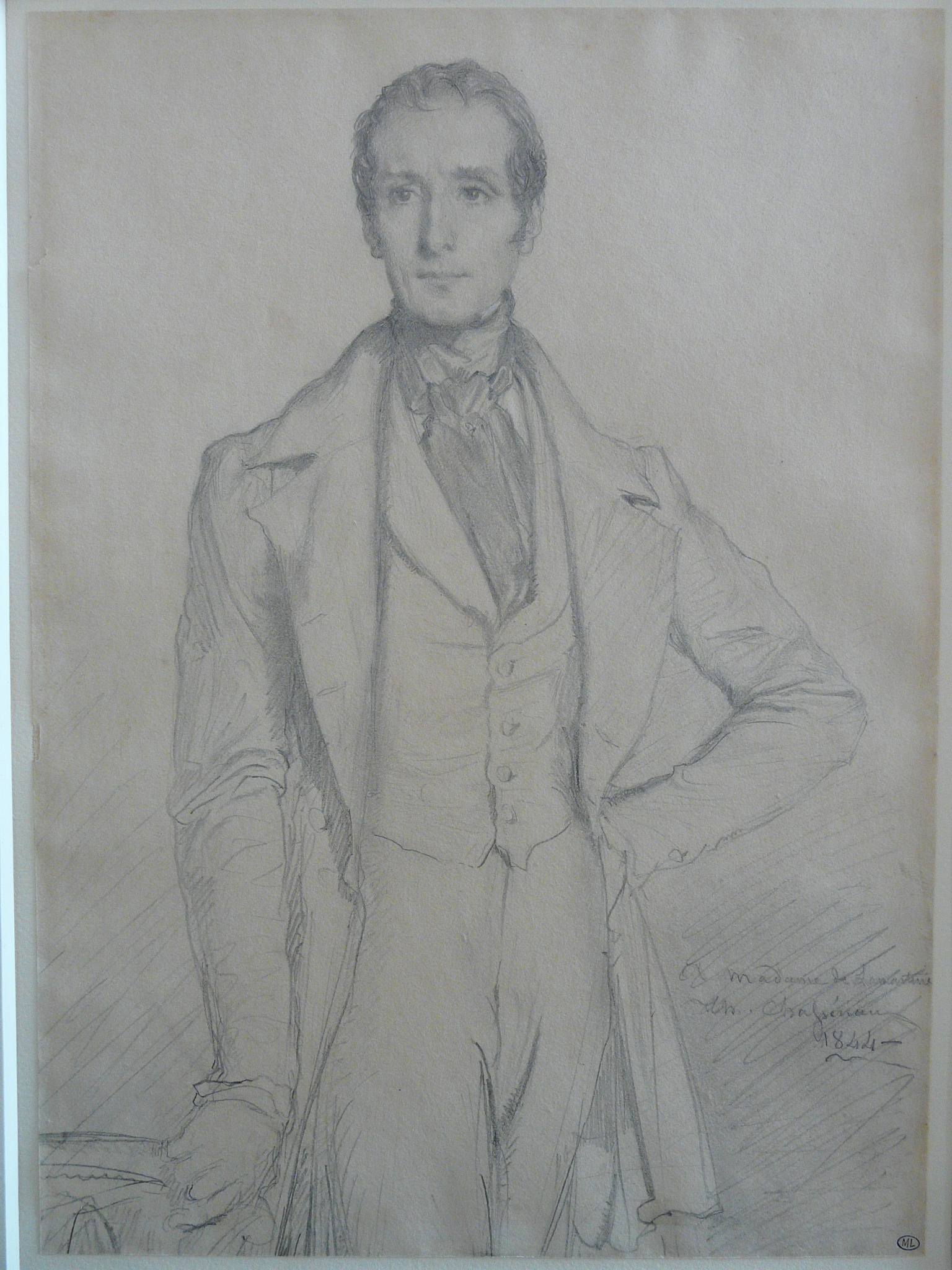
Portrait d'Alphonse de Lamartine, 1844, pencil on paper

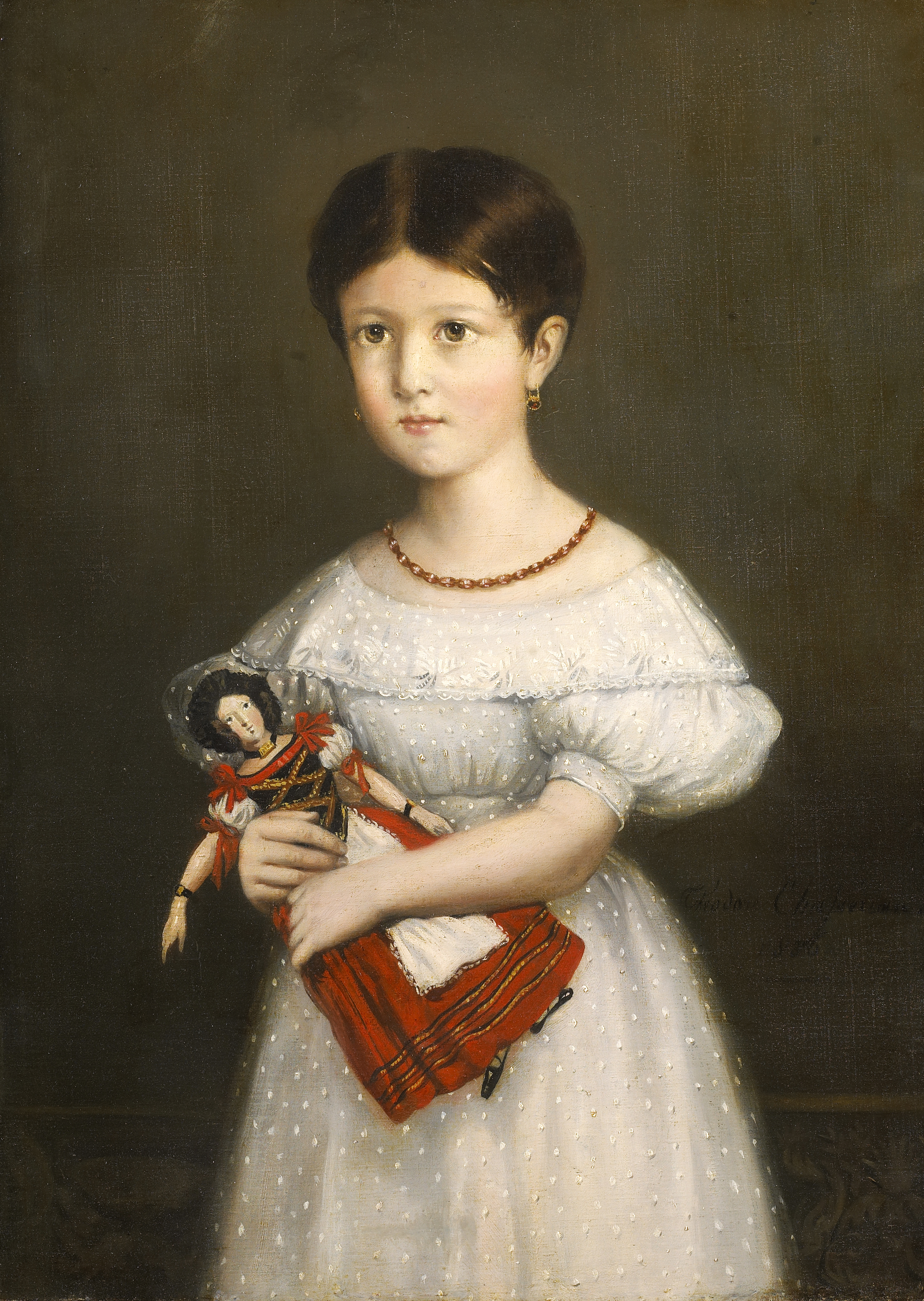
The Child and the Doll, portrait of Laure Stéphanie Pierrugues, 1836, oil on canvas, 79,5 x 57 cm

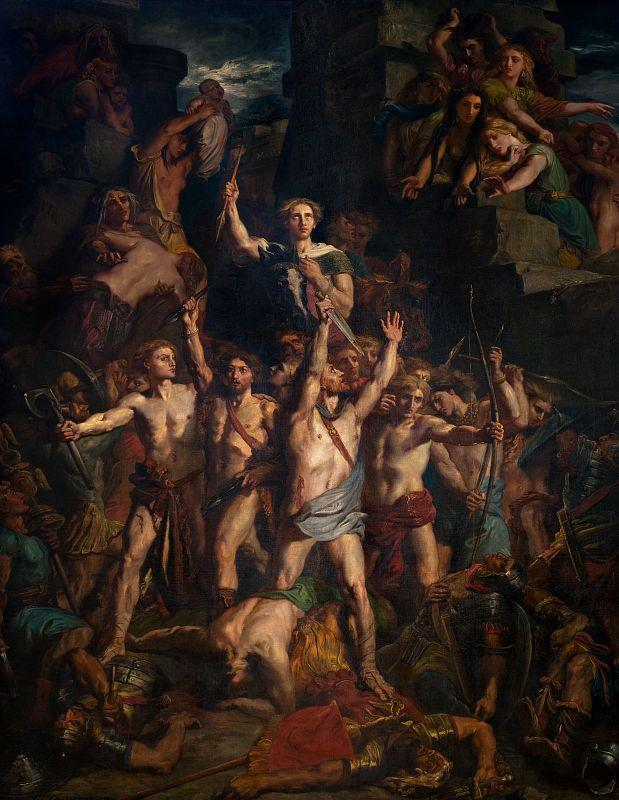
The Defence of the Gauls by Vercingetorix, 1855

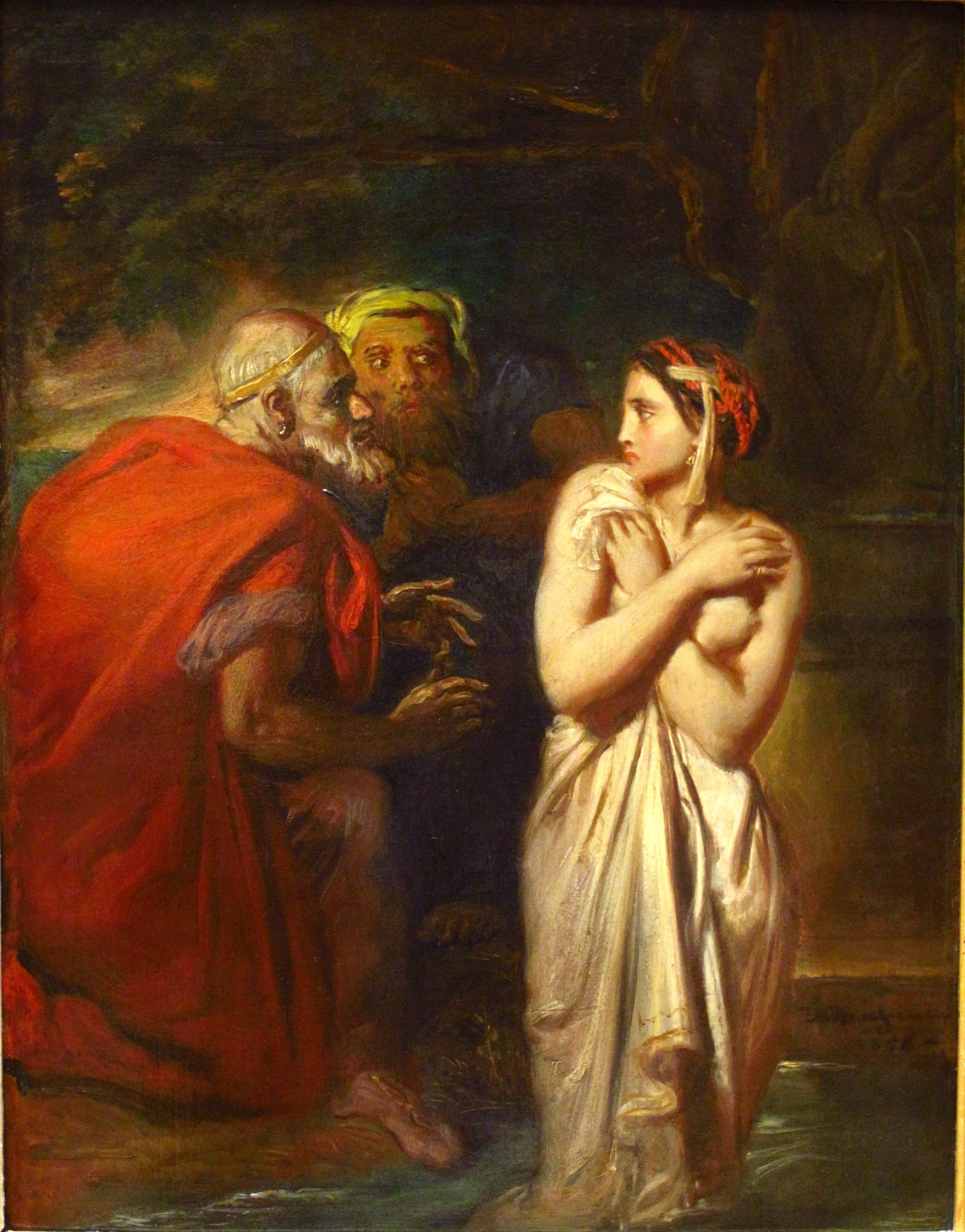
Susanna and the Elders, 1856

== See also ==
- Léonce Bénédite
- List of Orientalist artists
- Orientalism
