= Last words (disambiguation) =

Last words are a person's final words spoken before death.

Last Words may also refer to:

== History ==
- List of last words, collection of last words attributed to historical figures

== Film and television ==
- Last Words (1968 film), a short film directed by Werner Herzog
- Last Words (2020 film), an American film directed by Jonathan Nossiter
- "Last Words" (How I Met Your Mother), a 2011 American television episode
- "Last Words" (Line of Duty), a 2014 British television episode

== Literature ==
- Last Words, a poem by Emily Brontë published in The Complete Poems of Emily Brontë (1908)
- Last Words, a poem by Anne Brontë published in Complete poems of Anne Brontë (1920)
- Last Words: The Final Journals of William S. Burroughs, a 2000 book edited by James Grauerholz
- Last Words (book), a 2009 memoir by George Carlin

== Music ==
- The Last Words (band), an Australian punk band
- Last Words: The Final Recordings, a 2011 album by Screaming Trees
- Last Words (EP), by Ryan Hemsworth, 2012
- ”Last Words” (Ai song), 2003
- "Last Words" (Ten Sharp song), 1986
- "Last Words", a song by the Real Tuesday Weld from The London Book of the Dead

== See also ==
- Last Word, a factual BBC radio series broadcast weekly on Radio 4
- Last words of Julius Caesar
- Last Words of the Emperor Marcus Aurelius, an 1844 painting
- Sayings of Jesus on the cross, also known as The Seven Last Words
- Last Words of the Executed, a 2010 book by Robert K. Elder
- The Last Words of Dutch Schultz, an unproduced screenplay by William S. Burroughs
- The Last Words of David, a 1949 choral work by Randall Thompson
- Famous Last Words (disambiguation)
- The Last Word (disambiguation)
