= Salon of 1845 =

1839 art exhibition in Paris

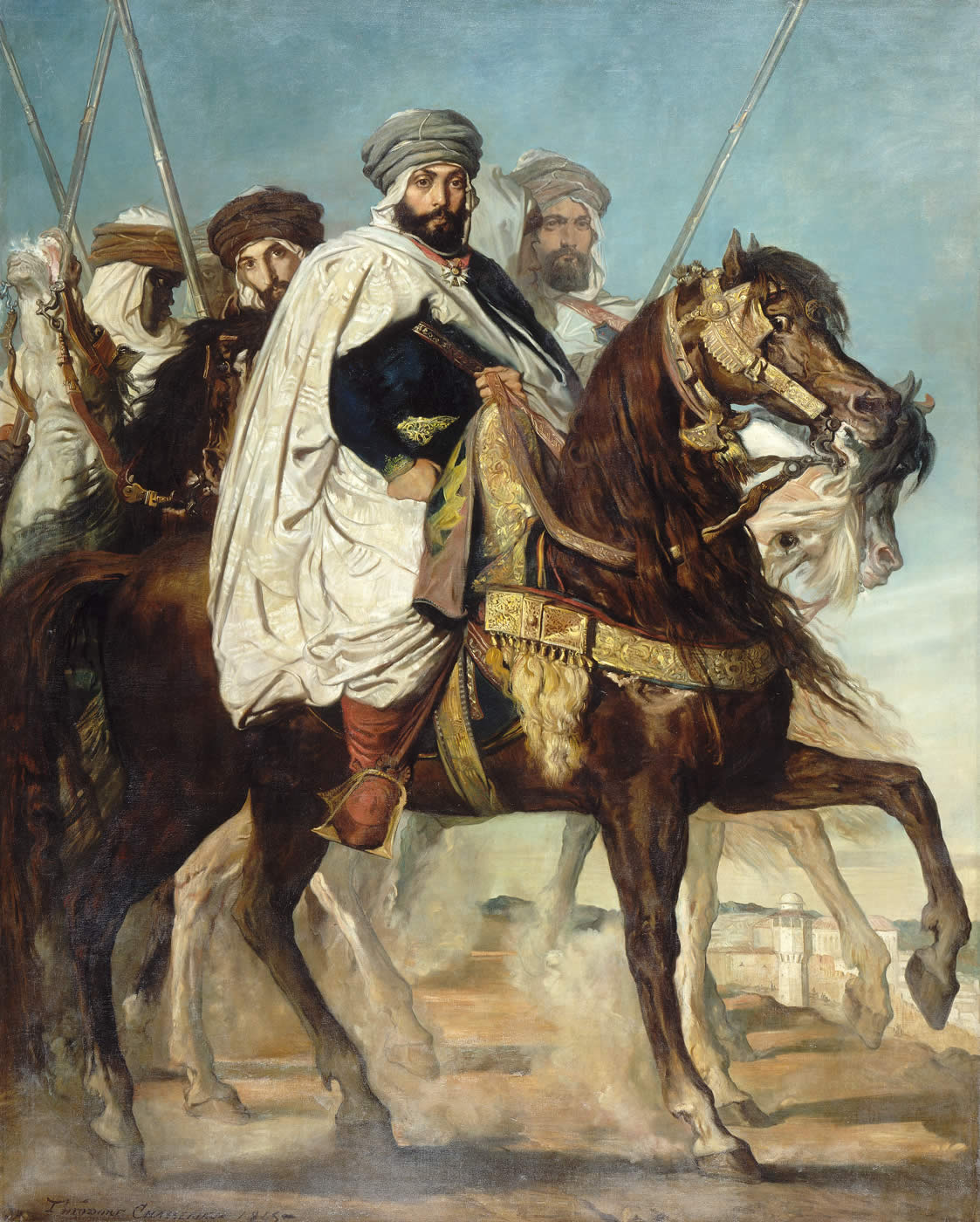
The Caliph of Constantine by Théodore Chassériau

The Salon of 1845 was an art exhibition held at the Louvre in Paris which opened on 15 March 1845. The annual Salon organised by the Académie des Beaux-Arts, it took place during the July Monarchy of Louis Philippe I.

Romanticism and Orientalism were then a strong influence in French art. Eugène Delacroix's The Sultan of Morocco was inspired by a trip to North Africa the artist had made in 1832. Another noted Orientalist work was Théodore Chassériau's The Caliph of Constantine.Delacroix also displayed the religious painting Mary Magdalene in the Desert. Gustave Courbet submittied his painting The Hammock but it was rejected by the authorities.

The series of large-scale commissions by the state for the Galerie des Batailles at the Palace of Versailles with The Battle of Rivoli by Henri Félix Emmanuel Philippoteaux, depicting one of Napoleon's great victories. A more recent incident in the French conquest of Algeria was shown in Horace Vernet's The Capture of the Smala of Abd El-Kader. Édouard Pingret's The Arrival of King Louis Philippe at Windsor Castle depicted the State Visit of Louis Philippe I to the United Kingdom the previous year, in which he had been received by Queen Victoria in Windsor Castle.

The Italian sculptor Lorenzo Bartolini exhibited Nymph with a Scorpion while Louis-Joseph Daumas displayed a plaster cast of his future bronze statue The Genius of Navigation.

== Gallery ==
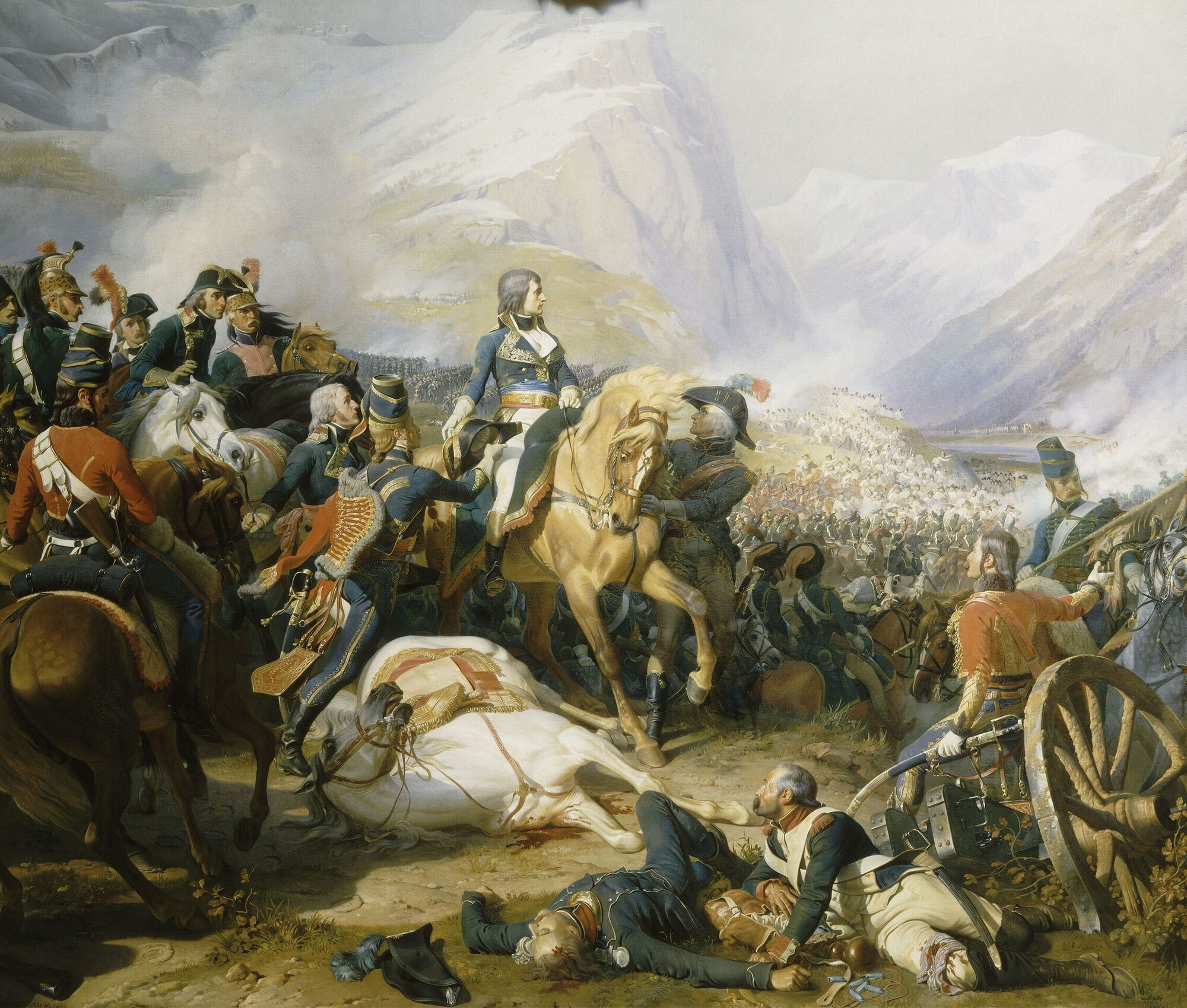
The Battle of Rivoli by Henri Félix Emmanuel Philippoteaux

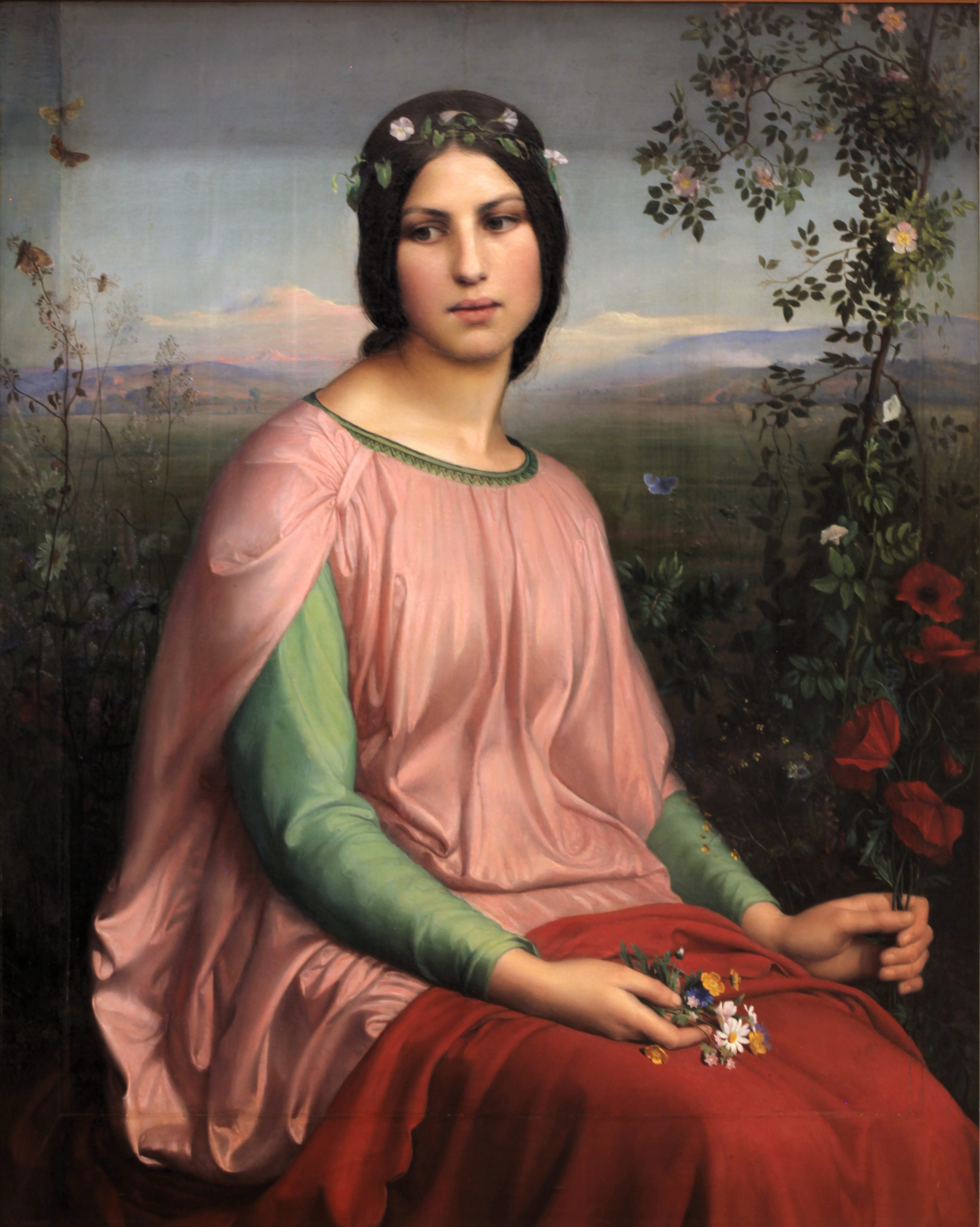
Flower of the Fields by Louis Janmot

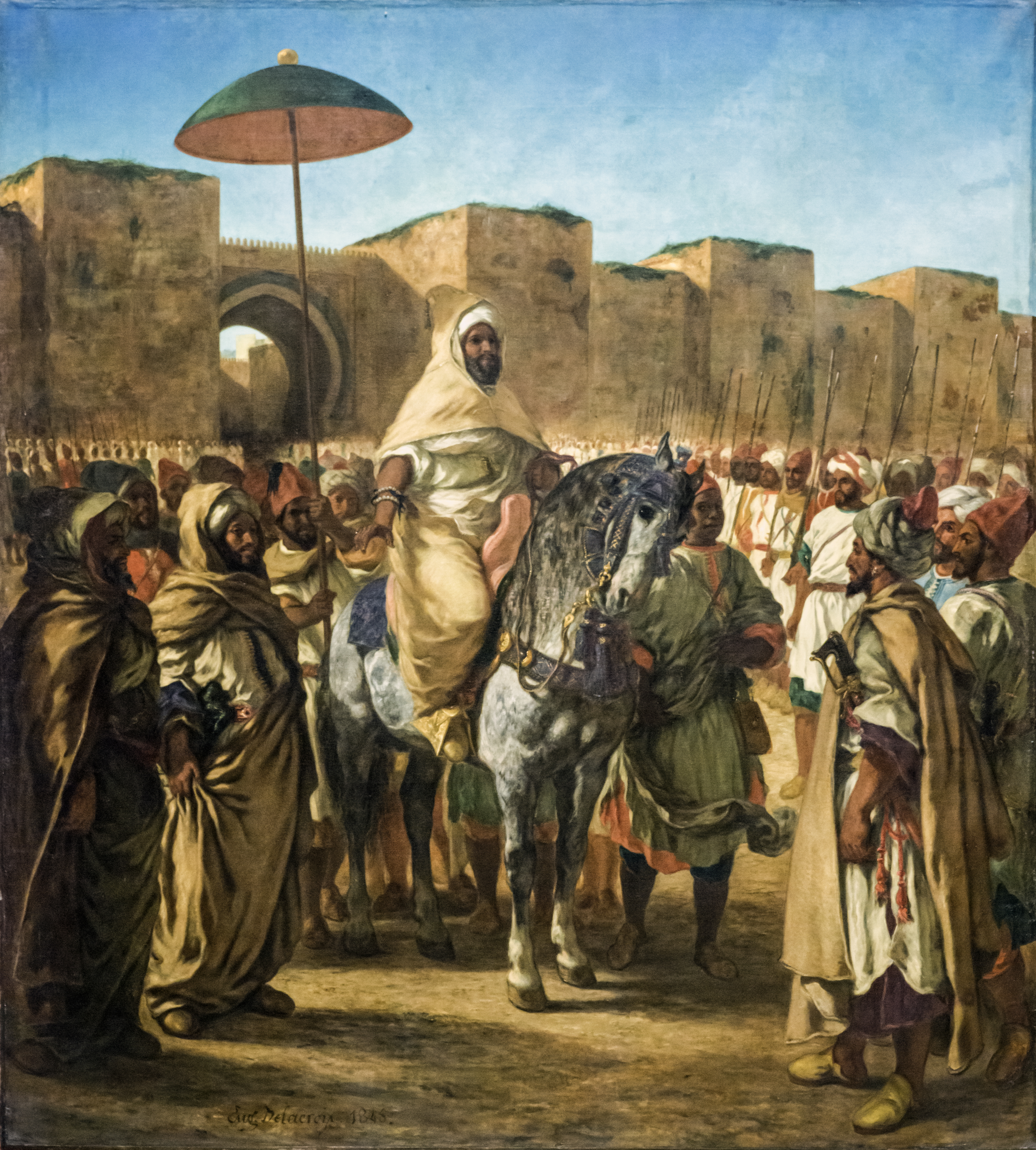
The Sultan of Morocco by Eugène Delacroix

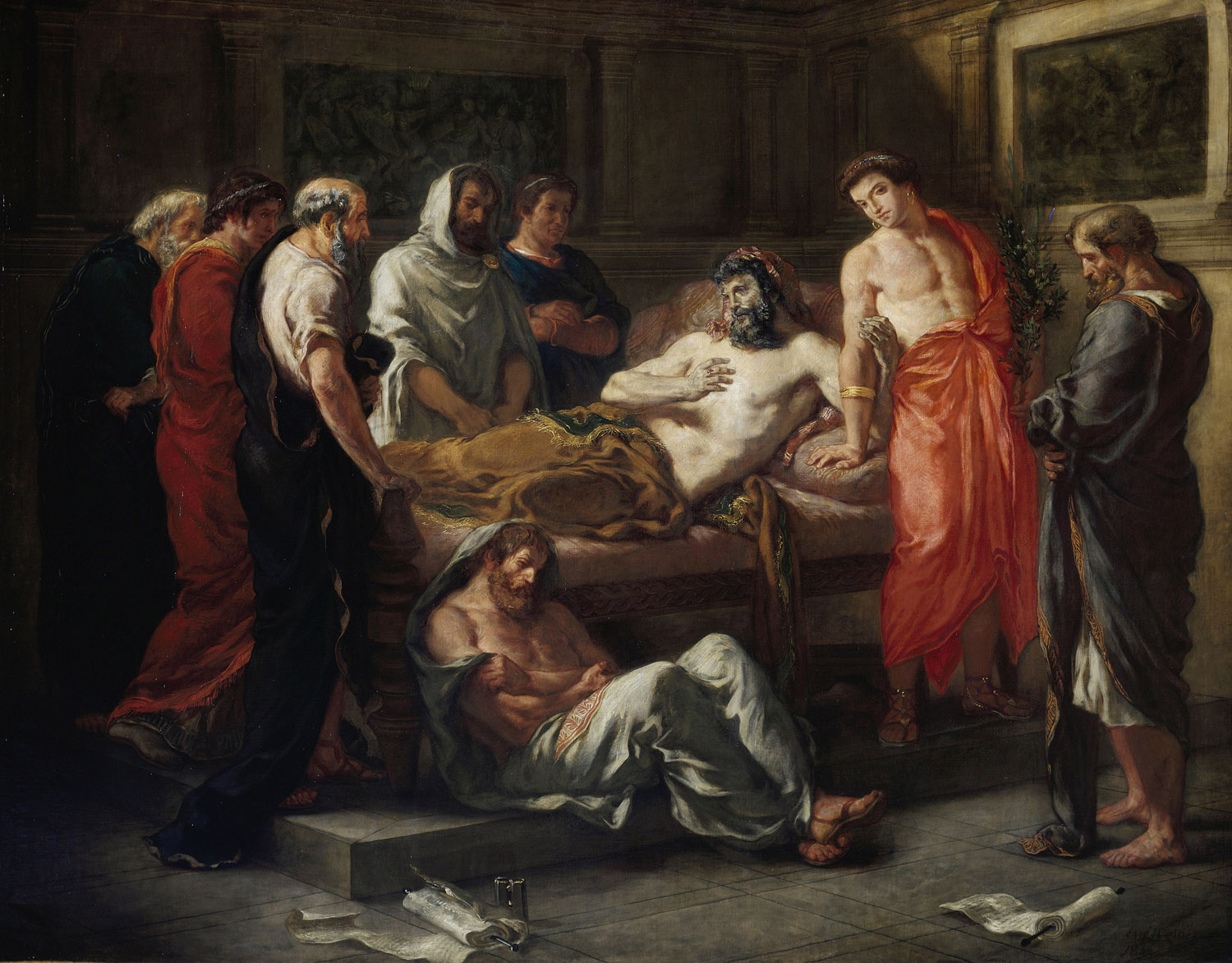
Last Words of the Emperor Marcus Aurelius by Eugène Delacroix

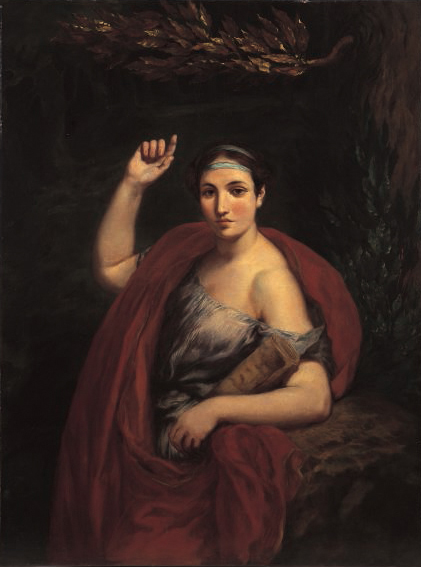
The Sibyl with the Golden Branch by Eugène Delacroix

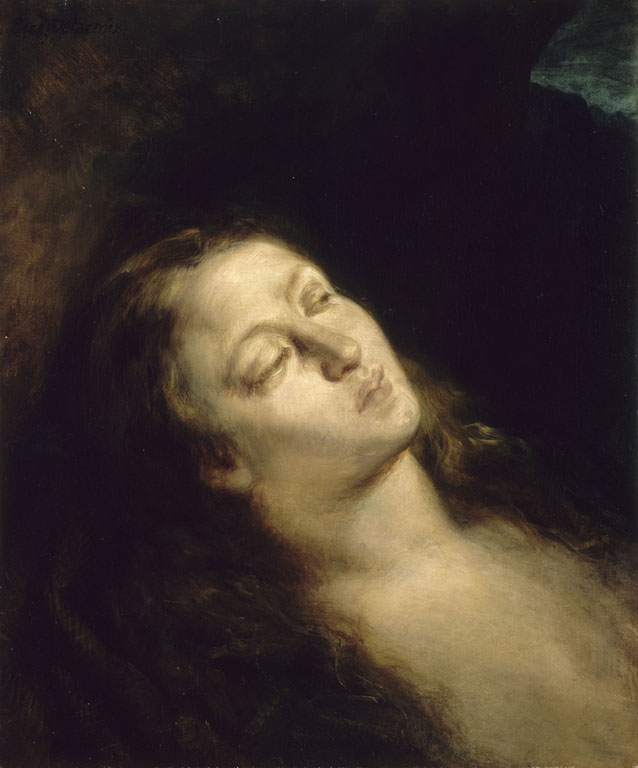
Mary Magdalene in the Desert by Eugène Delacroix

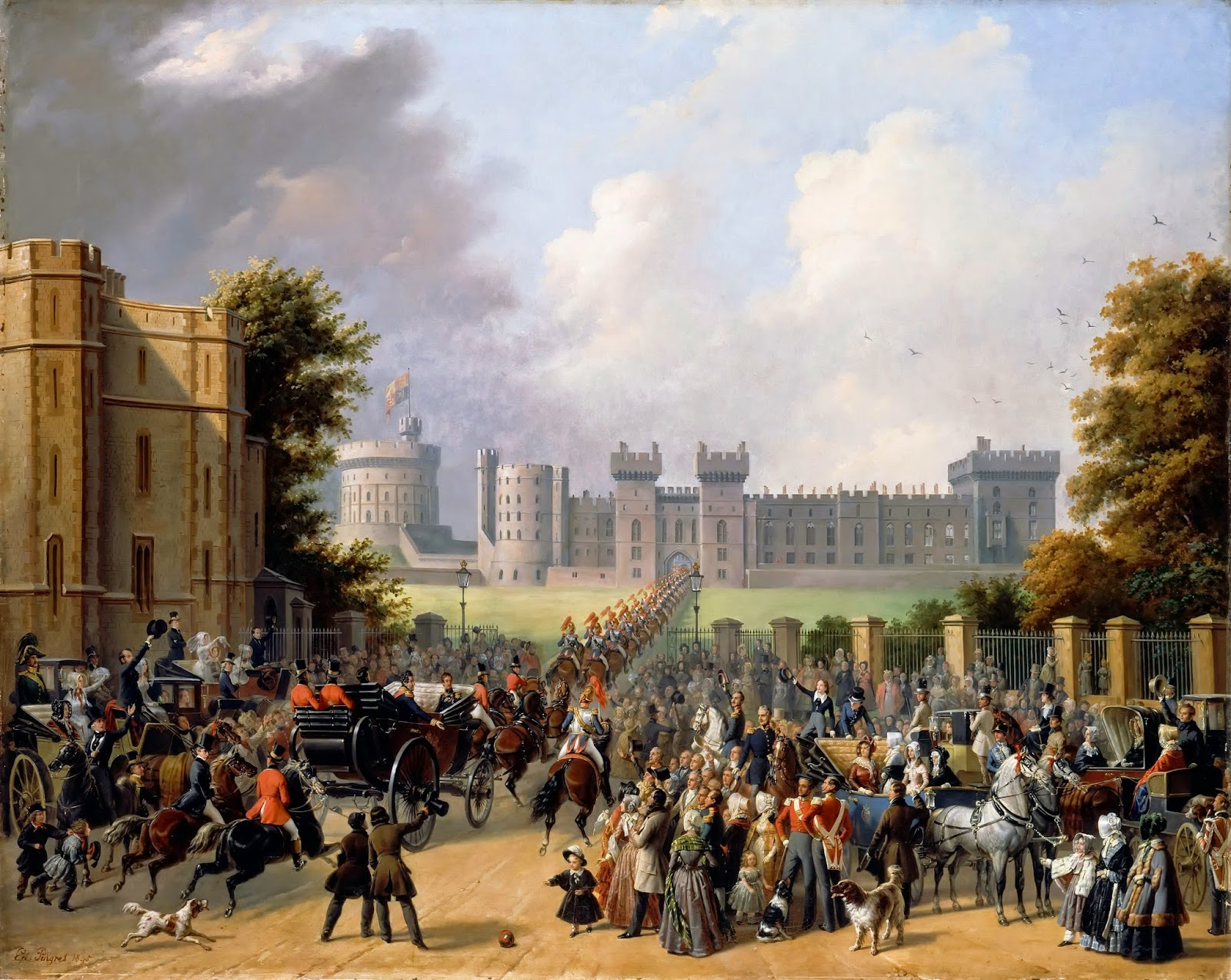
The Arrival of King Louis Philippe at Windsor Castle by Édouard Pingret

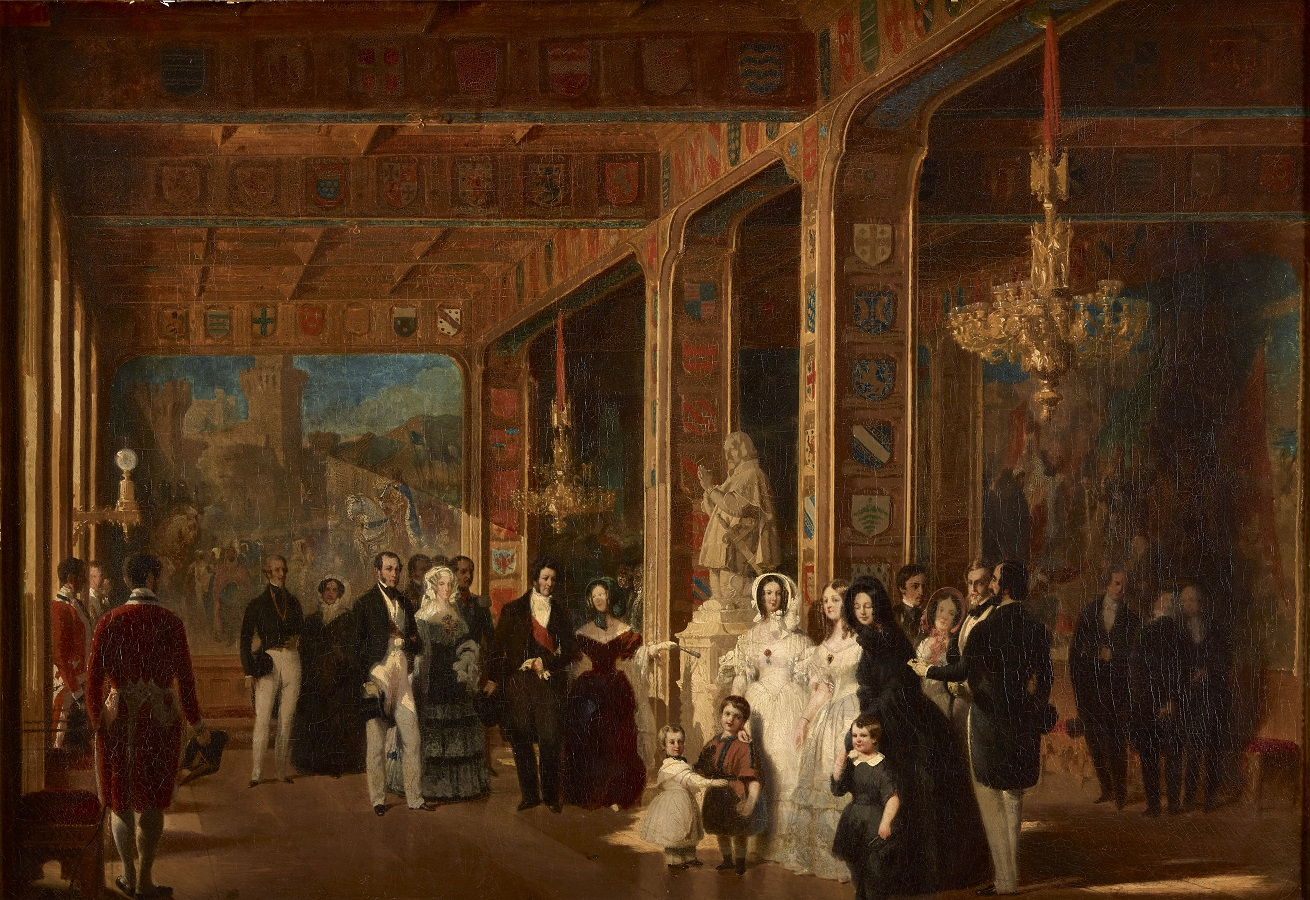
Louis Philippe Visiting the Salle Des Croisades at Versailles by Prosper Lafaye

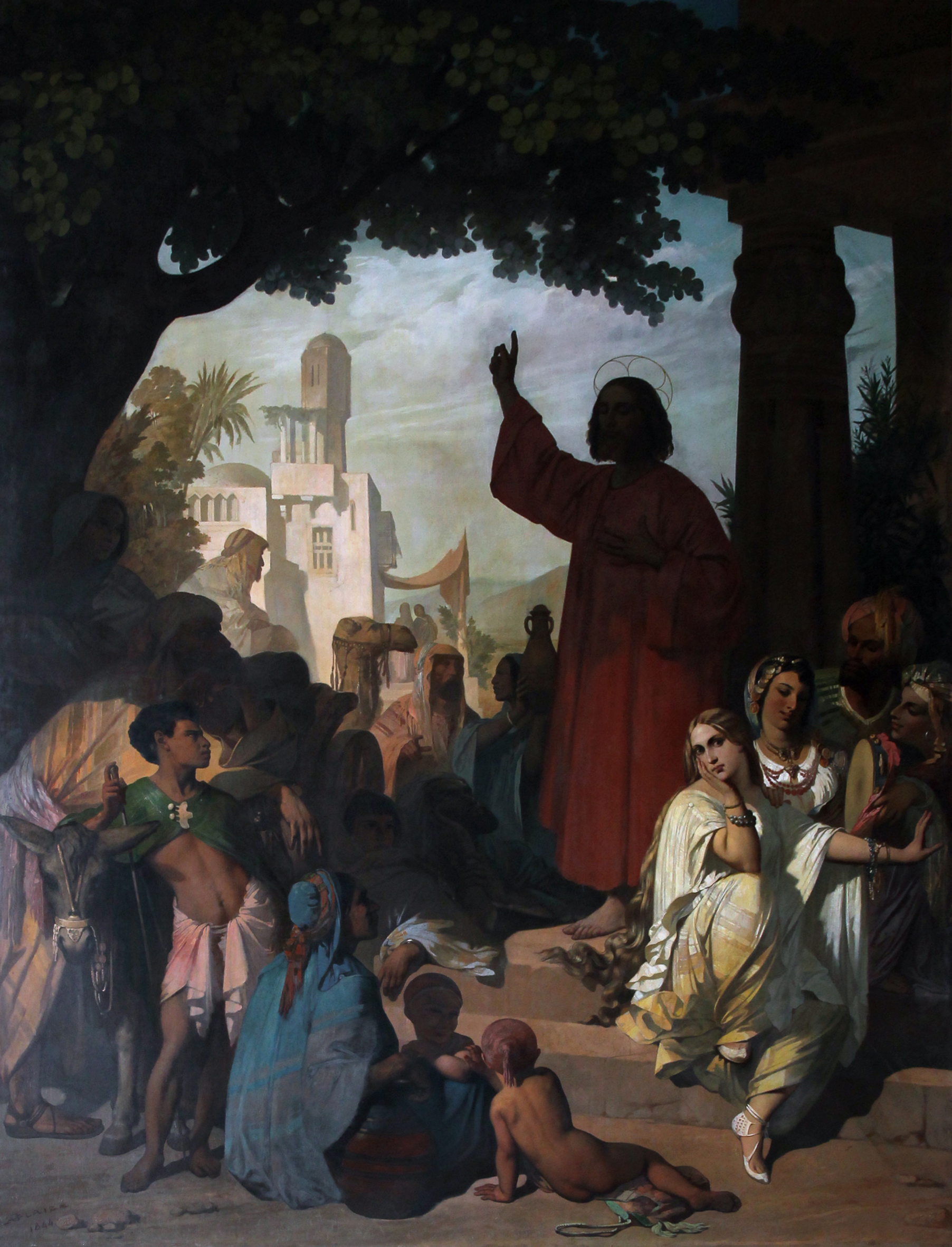
Conversion of Mary Magdalene by Auguste-Barthélemy Glaize

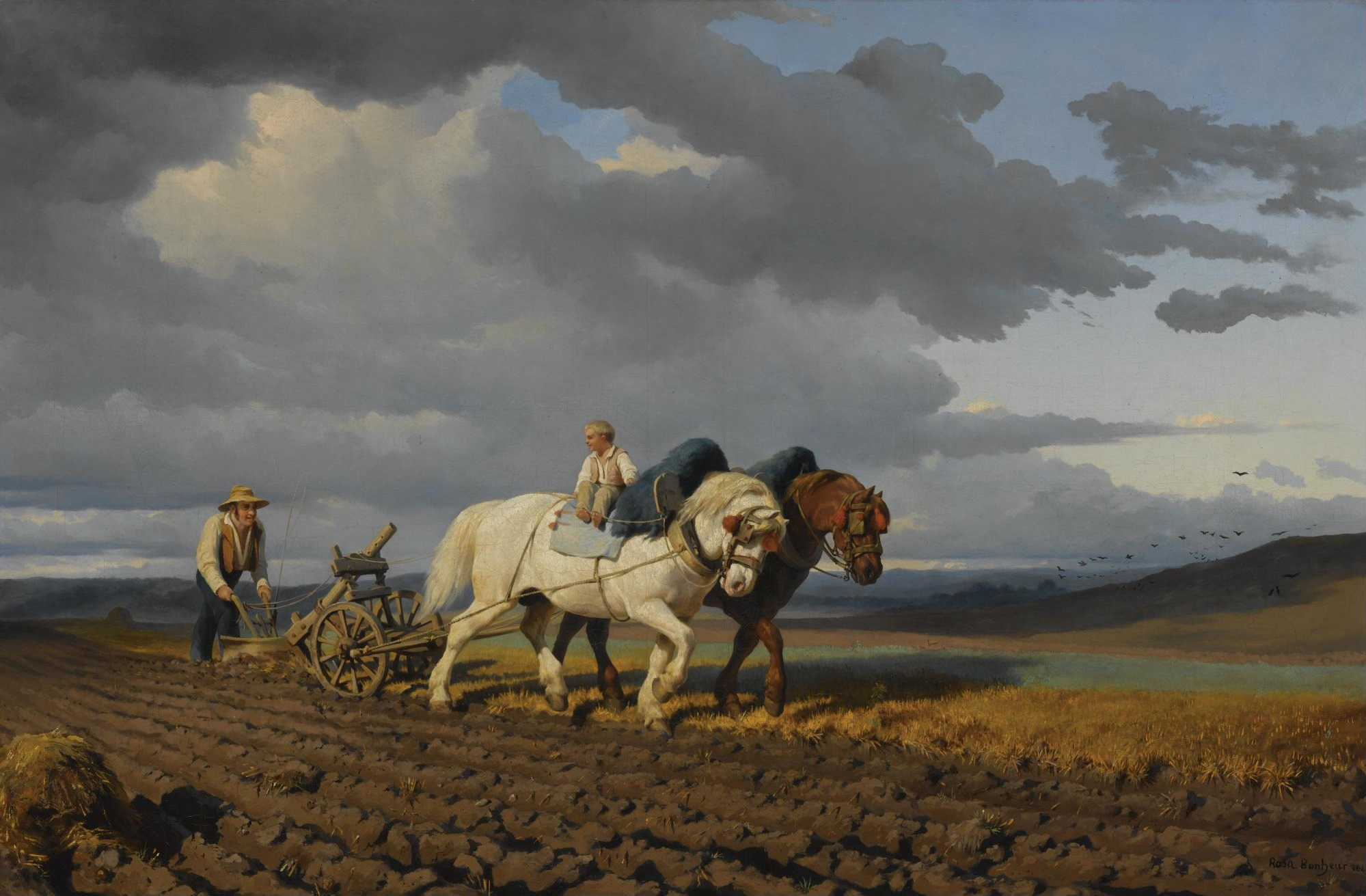
Le labourage by Rosa Bonheur

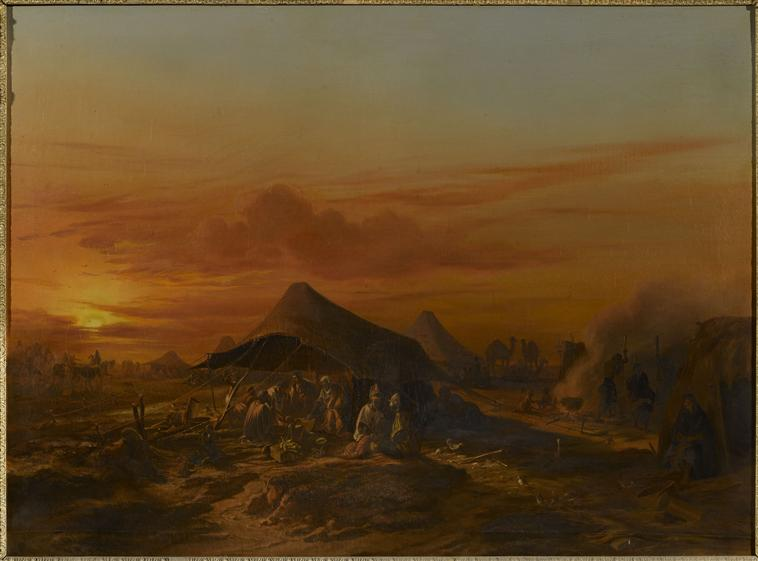
Campement au Sénégal by Édouard Auguste Nousveaux

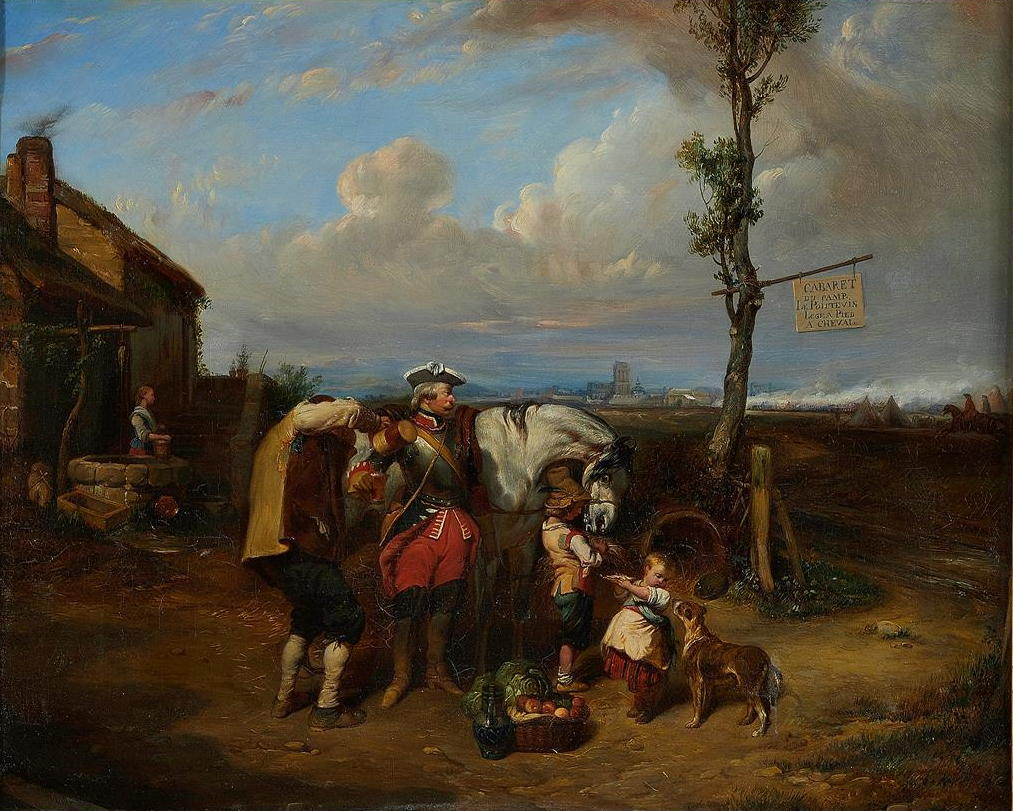
Le coup de l'étrier by Eugène Lepoittevin

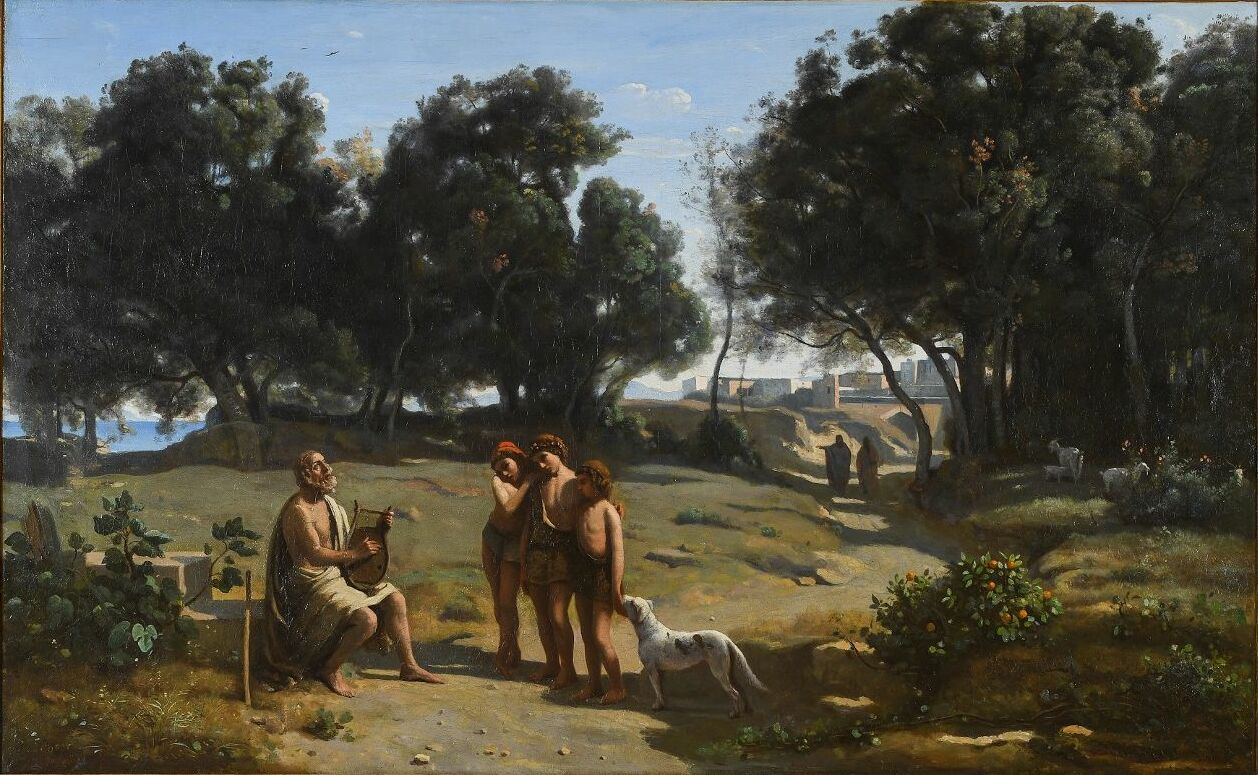
Homer and the Shepherds by Jean-Baptiste-Camille Corot

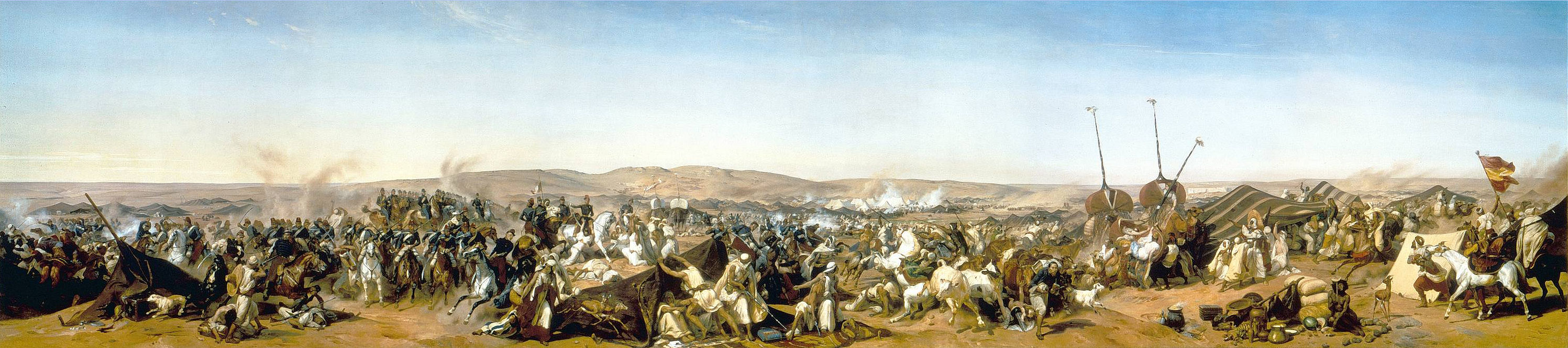
The Capture of the Smala of Abd El-Kader by Horace Vernet

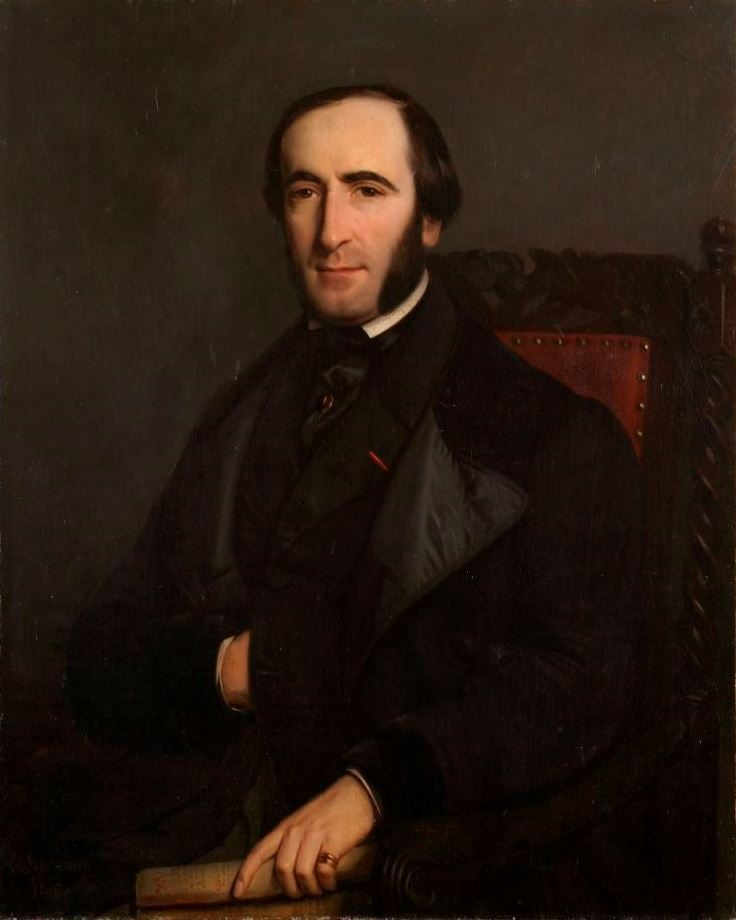
Portrait of Louis de La Saussaye by Emma Leroux de Lincy

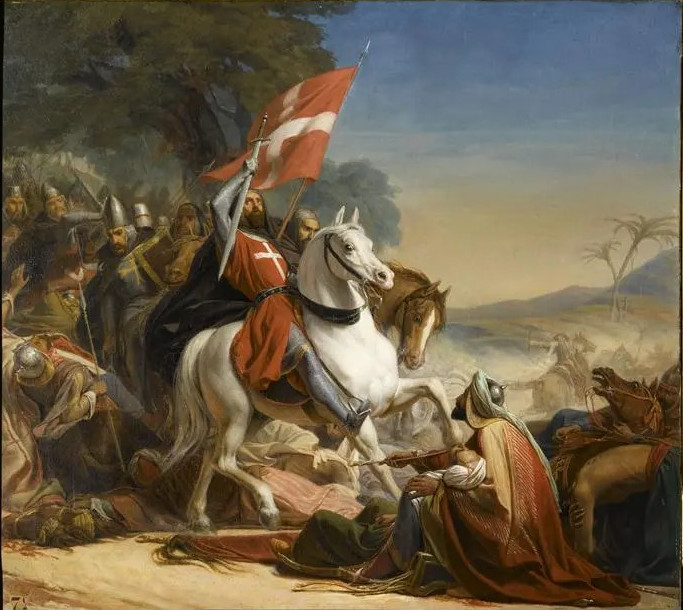
Defense de la Celesyrie par Raymond du Puy by Édouard Cibot

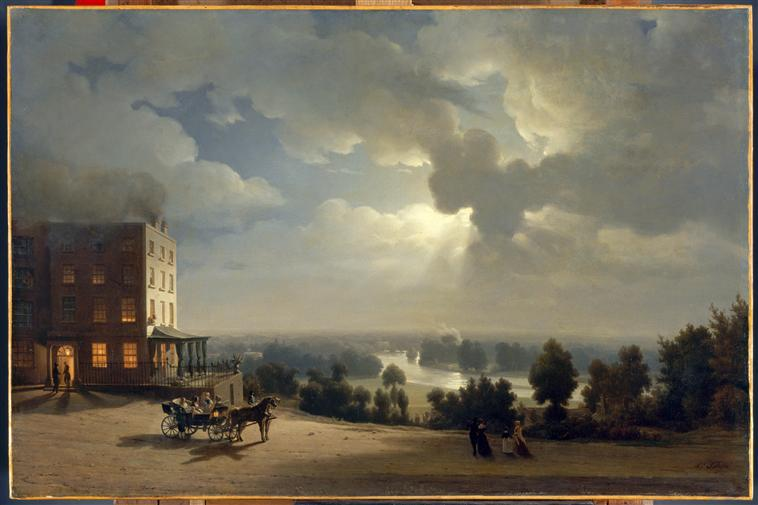
Vue De La Campagne De Richmond, Effet De Clair De Lune by Hippolyte Sebron

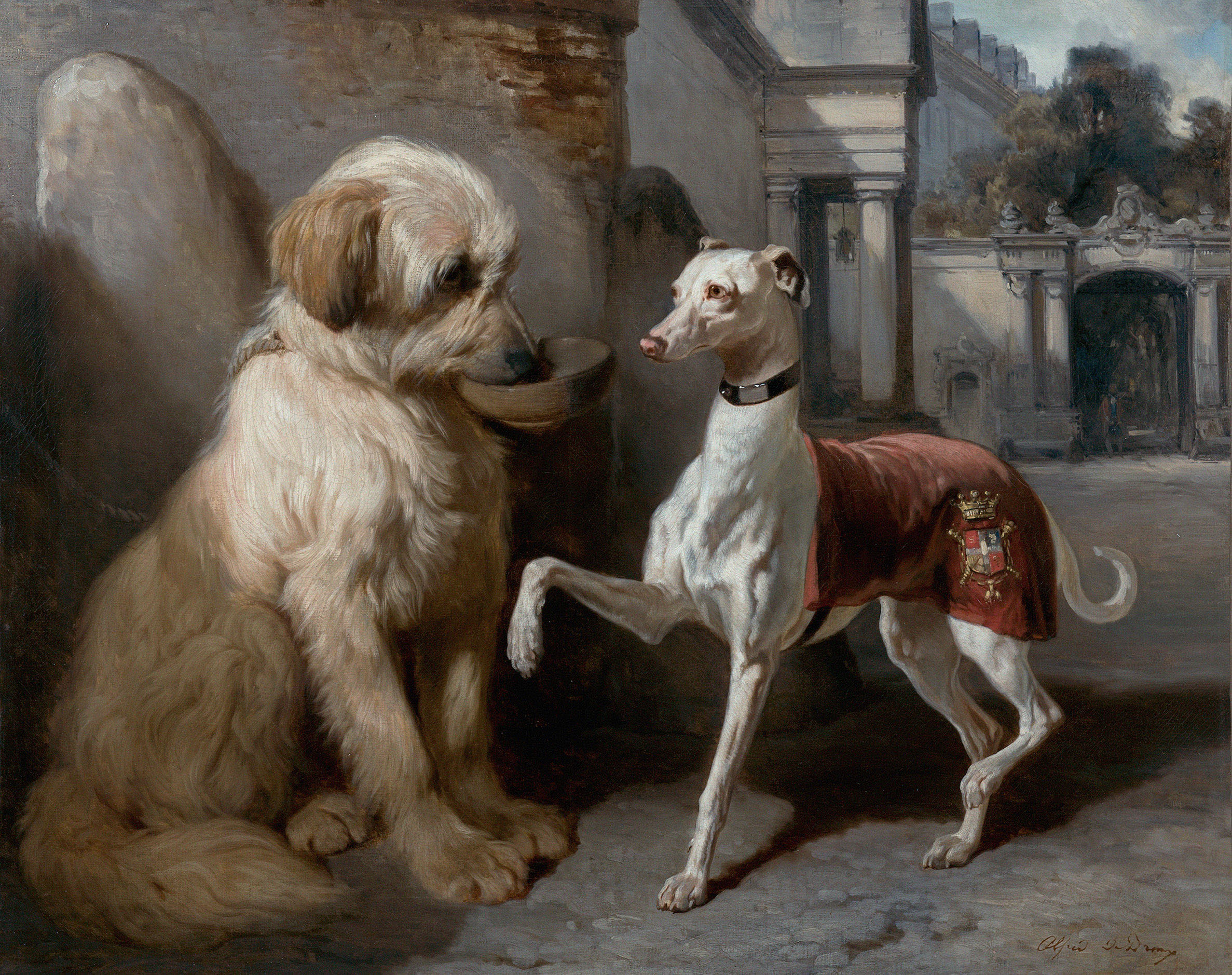
Rich and Poor by Alfred de Dreux

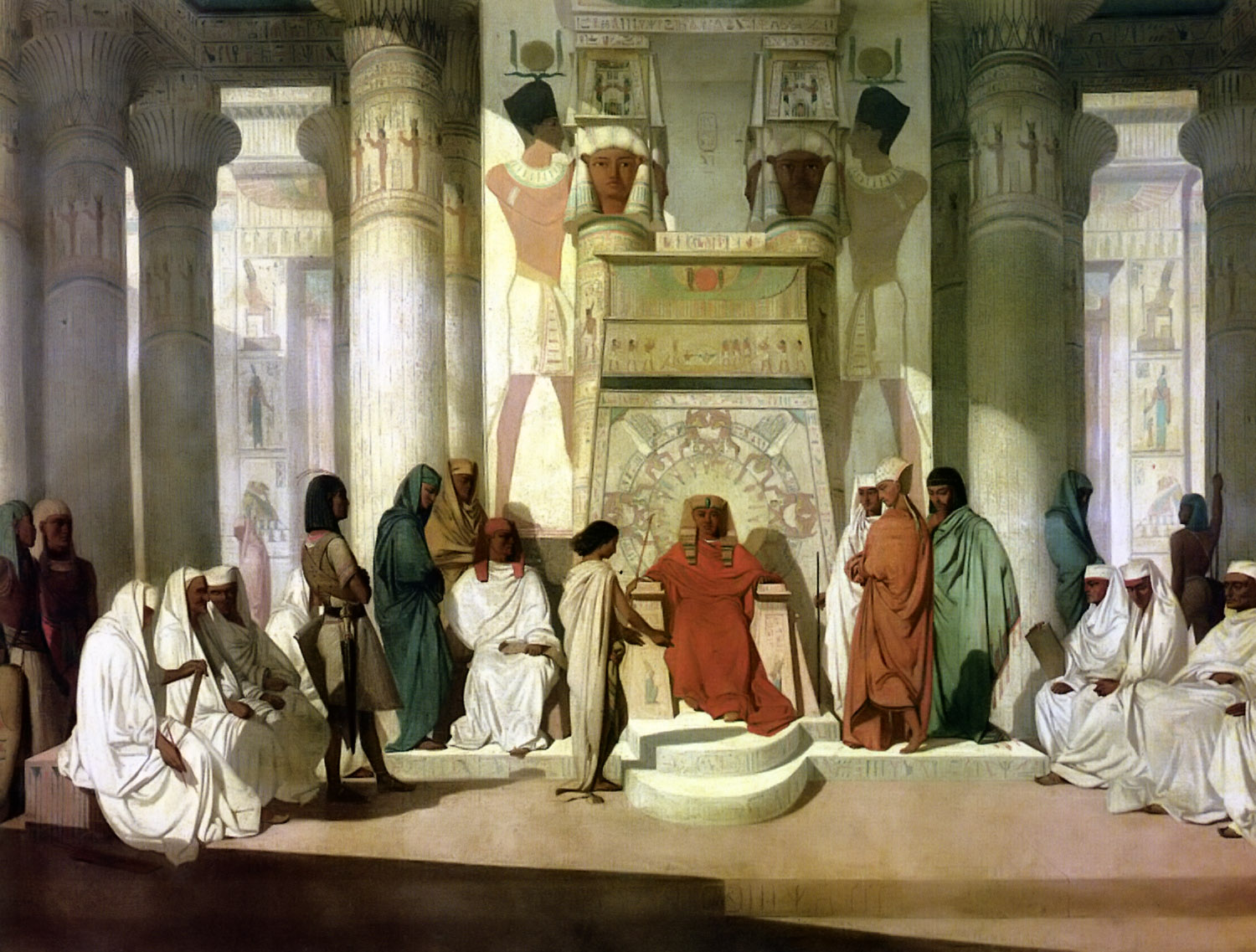
Joseph and the Pharaoh by Jean-Adrien Guignet

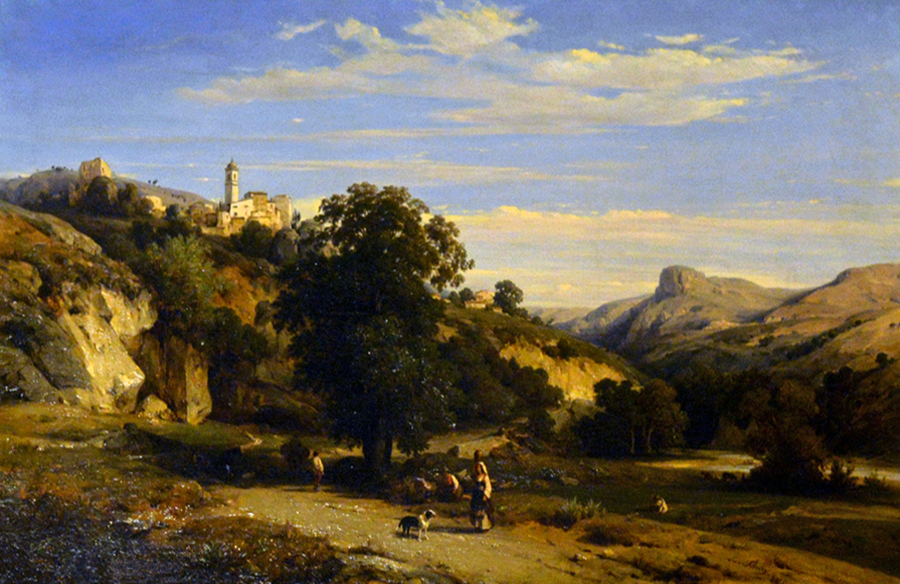
Vue du village de Cagnes, près d'Antibes by François Antoine Léon Fleury

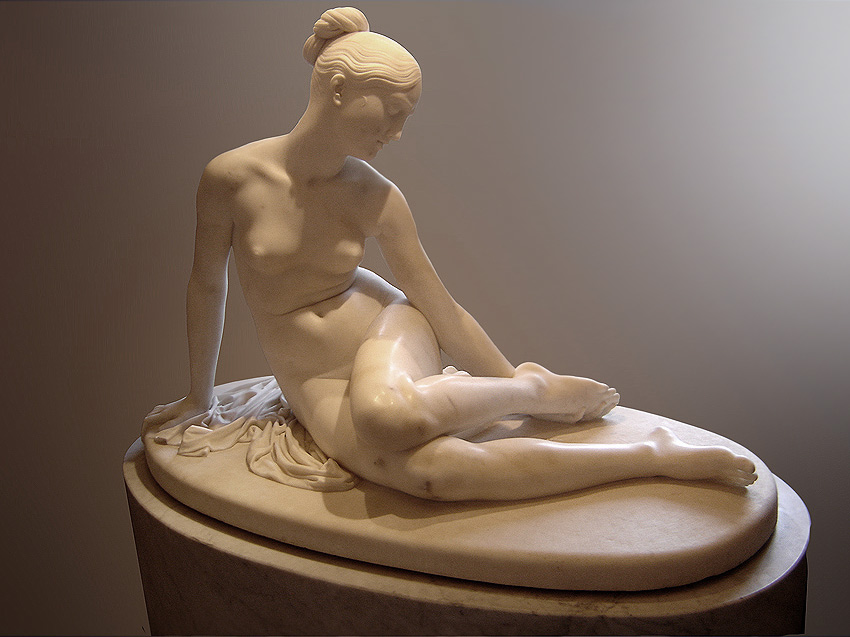
Nymph with a Scorpion by Lorenzo Bartolini

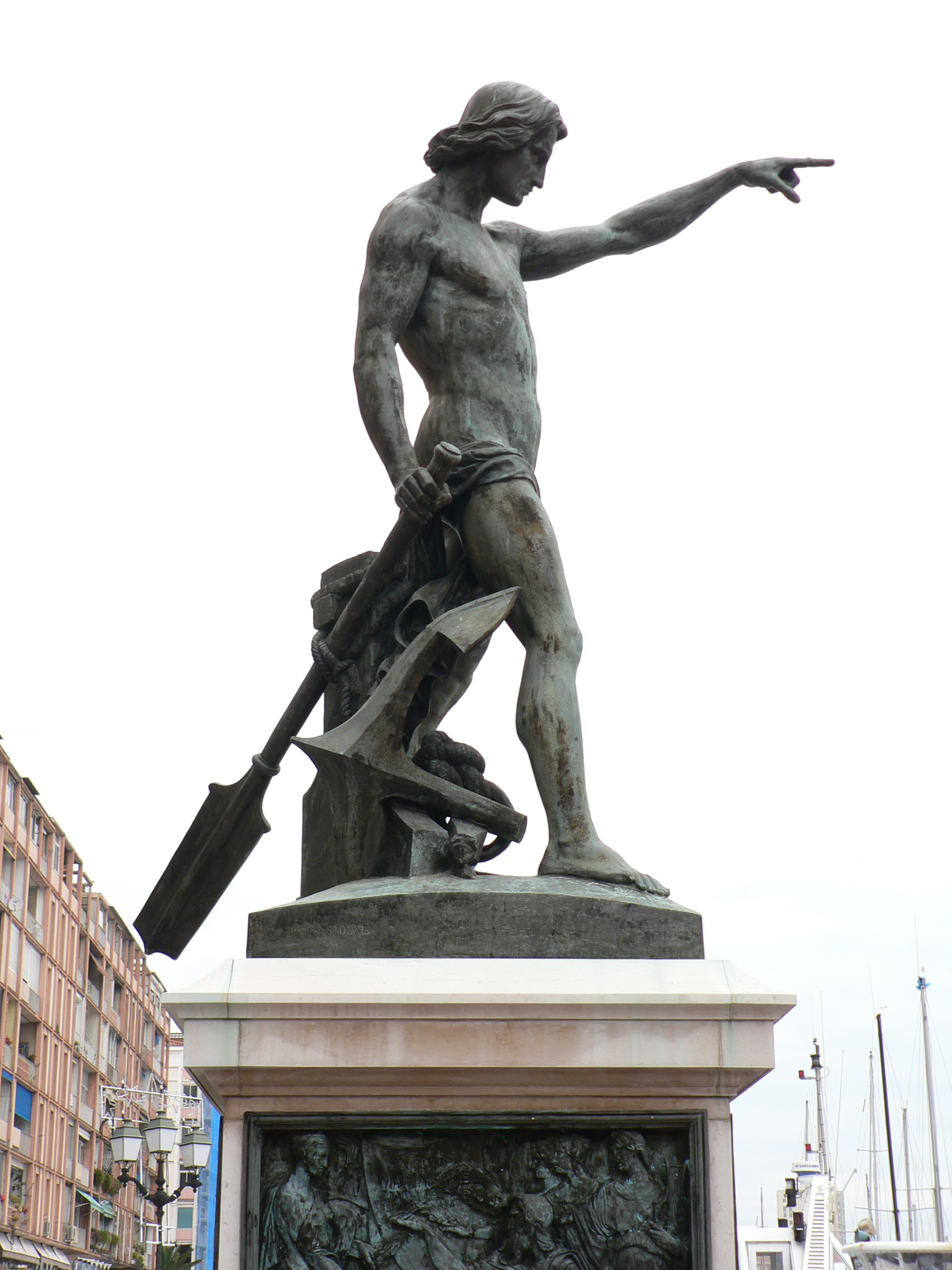
Le Génie de la navigation by Louis-Joseph Daumas

== See also ==
- Royal Academy Exhibition of 1845, which took place at the National Gallery in London

== Bibliography ==
- Allard, Sébastien & Fabre, Côme. Delacroix. Metropolitan Museum of Art, 2018.
- Boime, Albert. Art in an Age of Counterrevolution, 1815-1848. University of Chicago Press, 2004.
- Eitner, Lorenz. French Paintings of the Nineteenth Century: Before Impressionism. National Gallery of Art, 2000.
- Hornstein, Katie. Picturing War in France, 1792–1856. Yale University Press, 2018.
