= FLW =

FLW for FLW may refer to:

- Famous Last Words (disambiguation)
- Fishing League Worldwide
- Flood warning
- Flores Airport, in the Azores, Portugal
- FLW remote weapon station
- Fort Leonard Wood (military base), in Missouri, United States
- Four-letter word
- Frank Lloyd Wright (1867–1959), American architect
- Fulwell railway station, in London
