= The Last Word =

The Last Word or Last Word may refer to:

== Film ==
- The Last Word (1973 film), a Bulgarian film directed by Binka Zhelyazkova
- The Last Word (1975 film), a German film
- The Last Word (1979 film), a film directed by Roy Boulting
- The Last Word (1995 film), a film directed by Tony Spiridakis
- The Last Word (2003 film), a film starring Mary Lucia
- The Last Word (2008 film), a film starring Wes Bentley and Winona Ryder
- The Last Word, a 2008 documentary film about Johnny Frank Garrett
  - Johnny Frank Garrett's Last Word, a 2016 fictional film based on the documentary
- The Last Word (2009 film), an Iranian film
- The Last Word, a former title of Perfect Sense, a 2011 film starring Eva Green and Ewan McGregor
- The Last Word (2017 film), a film starring Shirley MacLaine and Amanda Seyfried

== Literature ==
- Poetry
  - The Last Word, a poem by Matthew Arnold in The Poetical Works of Matthew Arnold (1897)
  - The Last Word, a poem by Zona Gale published in Harper's Magazine, Nov 1903
- Short stories
  - The Last Word, a short story in A Thief in the Night (1905) about the gentleman thief Raffles, by E. W. Hornung
  - The Last Word, a short story by Achmed Abdullah published in Harper's Weekly, 1914 Oct 3
  - The Last Word (Knight short story), a 1957 story by Damon Knight
  - The Last Word (Greene short story), a 1988 story by Graham Greene
- Books
  - The Last Word, a 1997 book by Thomas Nagel
  - Last Word: My Indictment of the CIA in the Murder of JFK, a 2011 book by Mark Lane
  - The Last Word, a 2014 novel by Hanif Kureishi
- Journals
  - "Last Word", a section of the magazine New Scientist
  - "The Last Word", a back-page column written by the editor in chief of the State Magazine

== Radio ==
- The Last Word (radio show), an Irish news and discussion programme
- Last Word, an obituary radio series on BBC Radio 4

== Television ==
=== Series ===
- The Last Word (2020 TV series) (German: Das letzte Wort), a German drama series
- The Last Word (American TV series), an American talk show about the English language (1957-1959)
- The Last Word (Australian TV program), an Australian news panel discussion program
- The Last Word (Malaysian TV series), a Malaysian lifestyle show
- The Last Word (game show), a 1989 Canadian/American game show
- The Last Word with Lawrence O'Donnell, an American news program on MSNBC
- The Last Word, a sports interview program hosted by Jim Rome
- The Last Word, a 1982–83 late-night American network TV program

=== Episodes ===
- "The Last Word" (The Closer), 2012
- "Last Word" (The L Word), 2009

== Other uses ==
- Last word (cocktail), a gin-based prohibition-era cocktail
- The Last Word, an album by the O'Jays, 2019

== See also ==
- Last words, last words said before death
- Last words (disambiguation)
- Famous Last Words (disambiguation)
- The Final Word (disambiguation)
