= The Final Word =

The Final Word may refer to:

- The Final Word (novel), by Zlatko Topčić
- "The Final Word", a former USA Today column by Craig Wilson
- The Final Word, a 1987 album by Michael Card
- The Final Word, a cricket podcast co-hosted by Adam Collins and Geoff Lemon
- The FinalWord, later Sprint (word processor)

== See also ==
- The Last Word (disambiguation)
