= Battle of the Smala =

1843 battle during the French conquest of Algeria

Coordinates: 34.95°N 5.65°E

- Part of the French conquest of Algeria
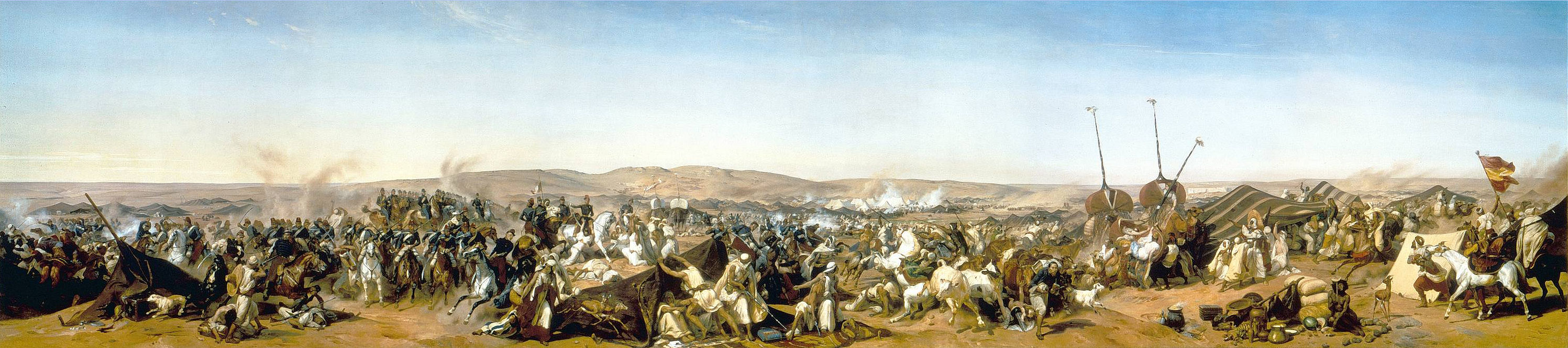
- The Capture of the Smala of Abd El-Kader, 16 May 1843 by Horace Vernet.
Date	16 May 1843
Location	Taguin, Emirate of Mascara
Result	French victory

Belligerents
Kingdom of France	Emirate of Mascara

Commanders and leaders
(France) Henri d'Orléans	Emir Abdelkader

Strength
500 cavalry	

Casualties and losses
9 dead 12 wounded	300 dead 3,000 captured

The Battle of the Smala took place on 16 May 1843, when the French, led by Henri d'Orléans, Duke of Aumale, raided the personal encampment (Arabic: زمالة zmala) of Algerian resistance leader Emir Abdelkader al-Jazairi while al-Qadir was absent on a raiding expedition. The 500 French cavalrymen surprised the camp defenders, who fired a single volley before scattering. More than 3000 of al-Qadir's followers out of a camp population of 30,000 were captured, as were many of his possessions, including his war chest and a library valued at £5000. Three days later, another 2500 followers were captured.

Al-Qadir fled to Morocco later that year, triggering French pressure on Morocco and the advent of the Franco-Moroccan War in 1844. He was eventually captured in 1847, ending major Algerian resistance to the French colonial occupation.
