= Last Words of the Emperor Marcus Aurelius =

1844 painting by Eugène Delacroix

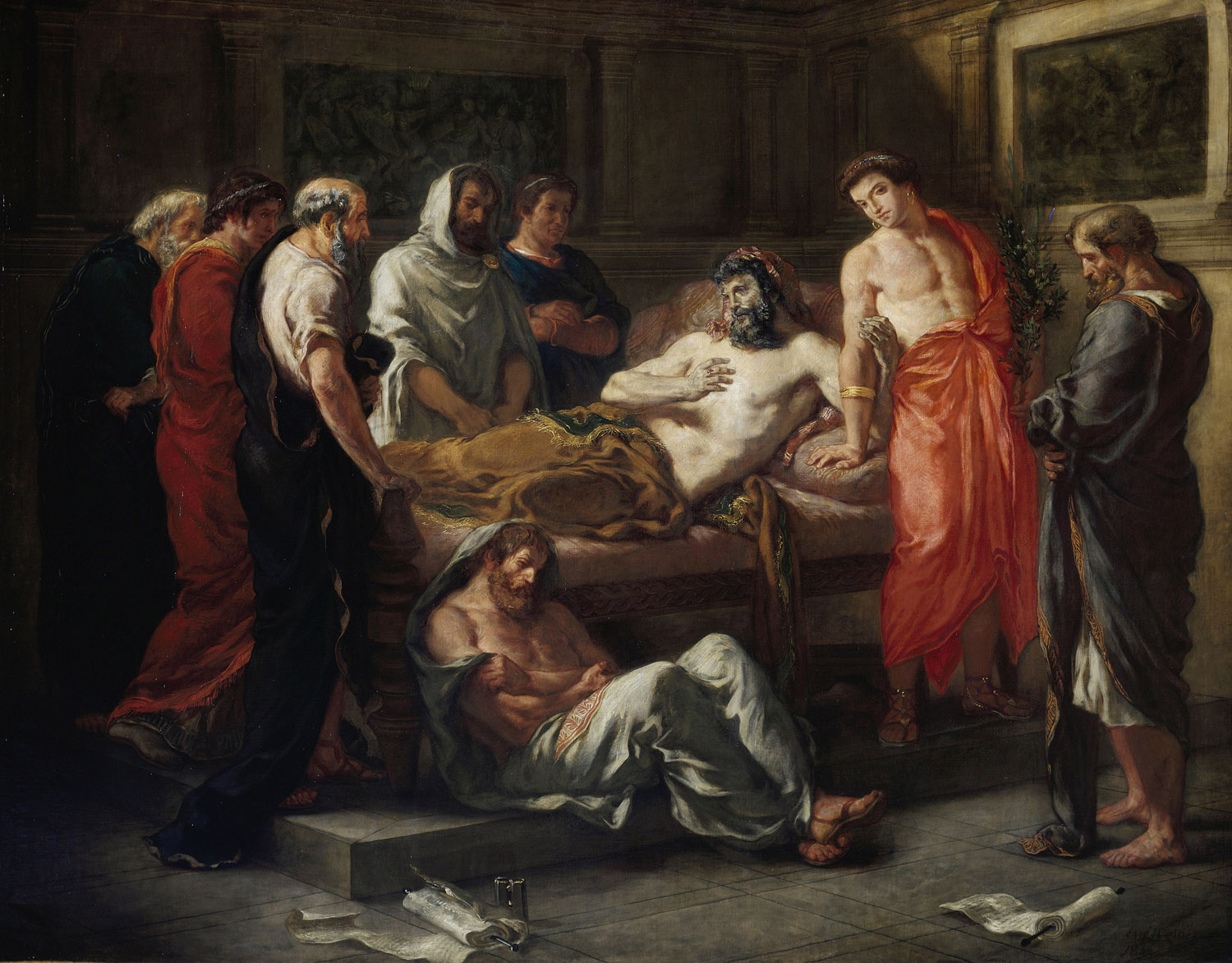
- Artist: Eugène Delacroix
- Year: 1844
- Medium: Oil on canvas
- Dimensions: 348 cm × 260 cm (137 in × 100 in)
- Location: Musée des Beaux-Arts; Lyon

Last Words of the Emperor Marcus Aurelius is an 1844 painting by the French artist Eugène Delacroix. Multiple versions of the painting are known to exist, the best-known of which is now in the Musée des Beaux-Arts de Lyon. A preliminary sketch by Delacroix is also kept at the museum. The work was first exhibited at the Paris Salon of 1845. The painting depicts the Roman emperor Marcus Aurelius on his deathbed, as he prepares to give his son Commodus over to his councilors and officers. The work is exemplary of Delacroix's embrace of more austere subject matter, and it is representative of his increased attachment to the classical tradition. Delacroix had a complicated relationship with the work, as demonstrated in the writings of his journal and in his management of the painting's exhibitions and sale.

== Background ==
Delacroix had considered depicting the subject of Marcus Aurelius' death as early as 1824, but did not until the 1840s. The painting was begun in 1843 by Delacroix himself, and then was worked on by Louis de Planet according to instructions laid out by Delacroix. Planet was Delacroix's student and frequent collaborator, and for this work he laid in the underlying sketch and the foundational glazes, following Delacroix's instructions. Delacroix resumed working on the painting in January 1844, and finished it in the autumn of that same year. Delacroix produced several versions of the painting, with the one on display in Lyon being the largest, and with there being several differences in composition and coloring between that version and the "Santa Barbara" version, an easel-sized variant. The work followed in the tradition of neoclassicism's treatment of heroism and death, and Delacroix drew inspiration particularly from Poussin's The Testament of Eudamidas and The Death of Germanicus. In the creation of this work, along with other works exhibited in 1845, Delacroix was suffering from an illness, which contributed to the somberness of the work. Additionally, the work was part of a stylistic moment in Delacroix's oeuvre where he focused on "great men of virtue and sacrifice", along with other themes, like the tension between temporal and spiritual power, and explored those subjects in the works he produced throughout the 1830s and 1840s.

== Description and analysis ==
This large painting depicts the last hours of the life of Roman Emperor Marcus Aurelius. Théophile Gautier, reviewing the painting when it was first shown at the Paris Salon of 1845, describes the scene:

The emperor, on his deathbed, recommends his son Commodus to wise men, stoic philosophers like himself. These grave personages, with unkempt hair, frowning faces, elbows on knees, hands drowned by a flood of white or gray beard, cast anxious and pensive glances at the young Commodus, who patiently listens to his father's remonstrances and advice, from which he would have already escaped if he had not been held by an arm which he vainly tries to free from his father's grip.

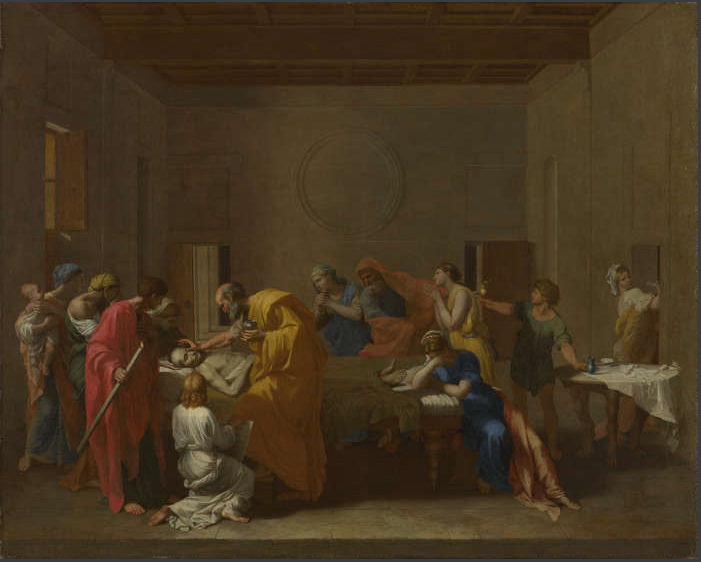
Extreme Unction, 1638-1640

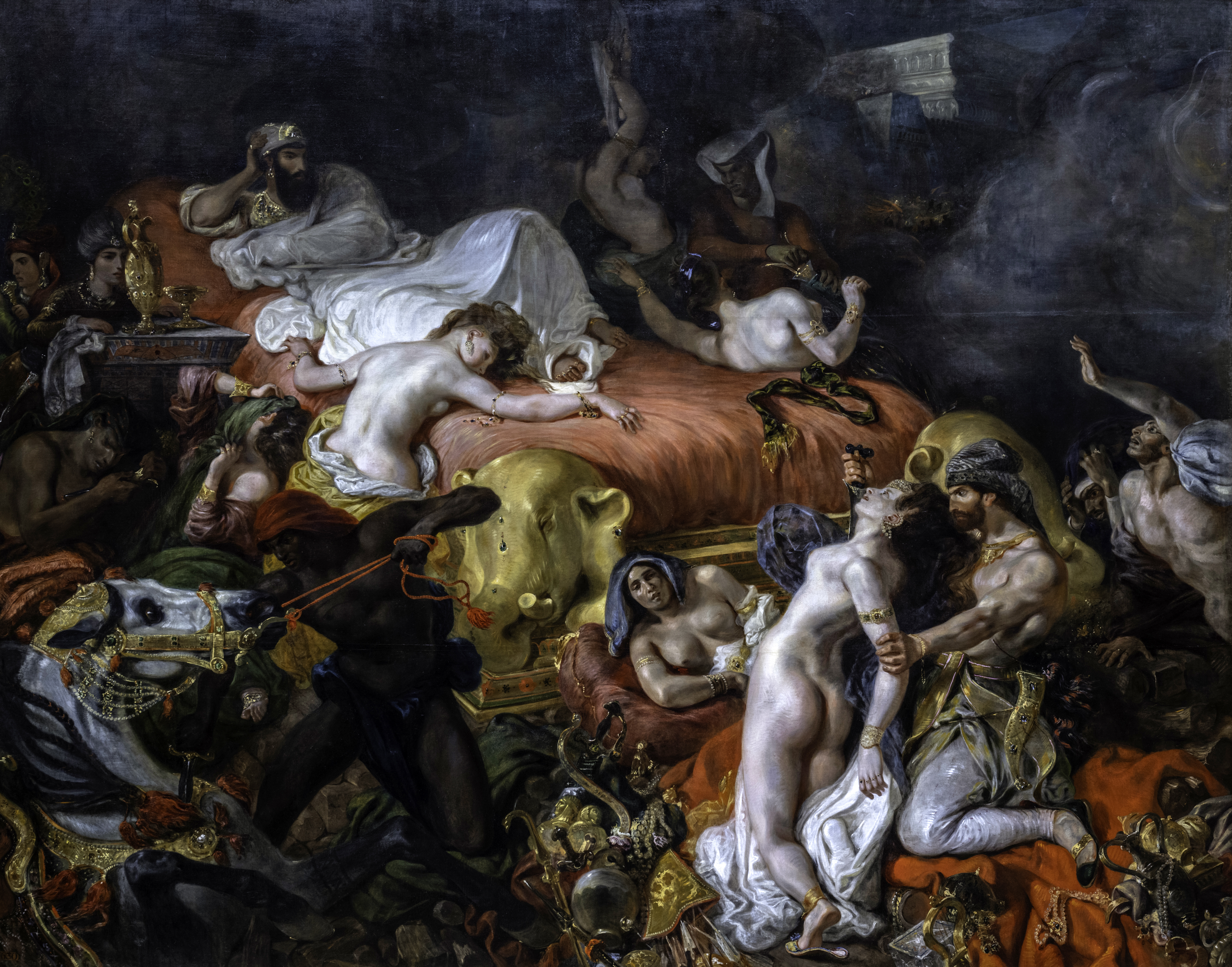
Death of Sardanapalus, 1827

The work exemplifies Delacroix's austere turn in the 1840s, as the painting incorporates the use of chiaroscuro and depicts a somber subject matter: the death of a wise and virtuous emperor. An earlier Delacroix work, Cleopatra and the Peasant, embodies this "Caravaggesque" stylistic movement, both in composition and in subject matter. Again, drawing on earlier neoclassical works, Marcus Aurelius expresses a "dark, austere" character, exhibited in another Poussin painting that depicts a similar deathbed scene, Extreme Unction. Delacroix portrays the final moments of Marcus Aurelius as a tragic end to a wise ruler, as he depicts Commodus, Aurelius' son, in a feminized manner, with a noticeably youthful body, whose red robe is symbolic of his dangerous sensuality. There were several versions of the painting, with slight differences between them. For instance, in the easel-sized variant, the facial expression of Commodus is softer and more stereotypically youthful. The scene is typical of the neoclassical manner of representing the death of a "great man", and can be compared to The Death of Socrates by David, a foundational work in the neoclassical tradition.

The work is one in a long line of Delacroix pieces that pertain to the subject of the end of civilizations, with early works like Greece on the Ruins of Missolonghi and The Death of Sardanapalus being indicative of that interest. Marcus Aurelius depicts a wise and measured ruler giving his empire over to his unruly and impulsive son, marking the end of a virtuous and prudent era of leadership. The painting depicts the fragility of civilization through the lens of a "Stoic resignation," where virtue lies on its deathbed in Marcus Aurelius, as hedonism and impulse take over with the beginning of Commodus' rule. Delacroix's rejection of the inevitability of social progress, a belief which many post-Revolution French people adhered to, is represented in this scene. Marcus Aurelius, a wise leader, cannot evade the damage his son will do to the empire, which reflects Delacroix's idea that infinite progress is unrealistic, as he notes in his journal, "progress must necessarily bring not an even greater progress, but in the end the negation of progress, a return to the point where we started."

== Delacroix's relationship to the work ==
Delacroix had a difficult relationship with Marcus Aurelius. He had been an avid reader of Aurelius' Meditations, and had a love for stoic philosophy, which increases the sense of tragedy depicted in the work. In his journal, Delacroix mentions the "disdain" he had for the work, and how he felt better about its artistic value after comparing it to a "figure by Dubufe". Delacroix's feelings about the painting are complex, and are exemplified in his management of the work's public exhibitions and sale. Delacroix decided against including the work in his program for the library of Palais Bourbon for an uncertain reason. Delacroix identified Marcus Aurelius as one of two "important" paintings of the 1845 Salon, but he also advocated for the state to buy The Sultan of Morocco, another work he had exhibited at the Salon, rather than Marcus Aurelius, where afterwards it would be housed at the Musée de Toulouse.

Marcus Aurelius represented a core aspect of Delacroix's personal philosophy as it illustrated his belief in the primacy of contemplating the human condition over the political. Delacroix wrote in his journal that Marcus Aurelius, along with Jesus Christ, exemplified an authentic moralist, a person who considered "sickness, death, poverty, the pains of the soul..." as preeminent concerns for humanity and present in all political regimes. As evidenced by his journal entry emphasizing the disdain he had for Marcus Aurelius in an aesthetic sense and in his convincing of the state to purchase The Sultan of Morocco, it is clear Delacroix did not believe it to be one of his greatest or most beautiful works. However, he considered Marcus Aurelius to be representative of his stoic leanings, and thought that through the work, he was making a commentary on the current political and economic state of France, which he saw as descending into an unhealthy materialism and commercialism. Delacroix asserts, "Mercantilism and the love of pleasure are, in this state of things, the most energetic motives of the human soul."

== Reception ==
Théophile Gautier wrote: "The breast, the head, and the robe of the young Caesar are of a beauty of color to inspire the envy of the Flemings and the Venetians...everywhere shines a firm and masterly touch." Charles Baudelaire called it "a splendid painting, magnificent, sublime, misunderstood...one of the most complete specimens of what genius can do in painting." Frequent critic of Delacroix, Étienne Delécluze, connected the painting to several 17th-century works, such as Greuze's The Rape of the Sabine Women and Fragonard's Callirhoe. Another critic noted that,

The Death [Last Words] of Marcus Aurelius is composed almost like David's Death of Socrates. ... An odd comparison between the two leaders of schools that would seem to be at art's antipodes. But, really, M. Eugène Delacroix's Romans are just like David's Greeks. They have more humanity, so to speak. ... The overall effect of the composition inspires meditation and respect. It is not a requirement, in representing these great scenes of the ancient world, to be cold and stilted.
