= The Arrival of Queen Victoria at the Château d'Eu =

Painting by Eugène Lami

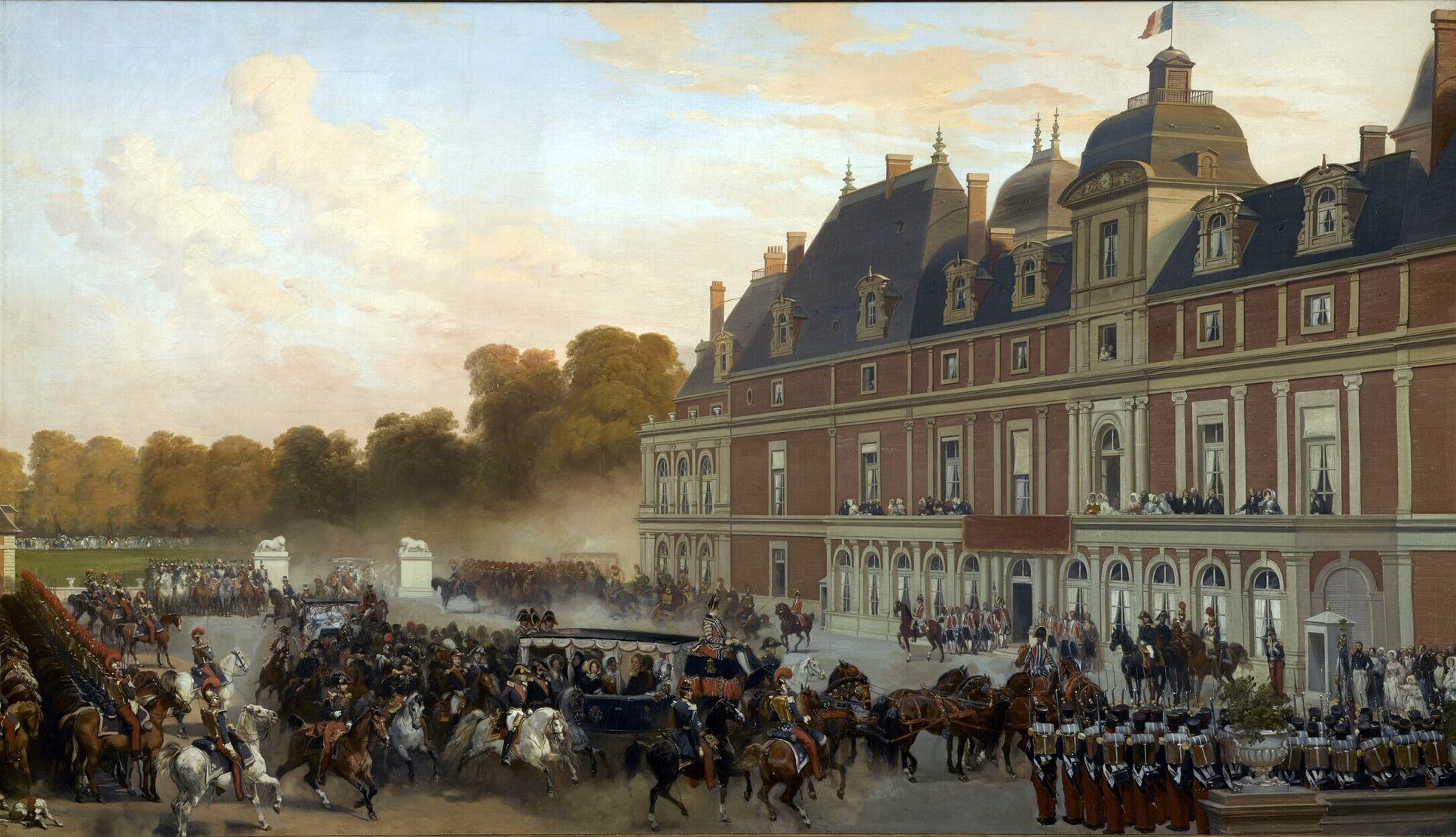
- Artist: Eugène Lami
- Year: 1843
- Type: Oil on canvas, history painting
- Dimensions: 84 cm × 141 cm (33 in × 56 in)
- Location: Palace of Versailles, Versailles

The Arrival of Queen Victoria at the Château d'Eu (French: Arrivée de la reine Victoria au château d'Eu) is an oil on canvas history painting by the French artist Eugène Lami, from 1843.

== History and description ==
It depicts the arrival of Queen Victoria at the Château d'Eu in Normandy to meet with Louis Philippe I on 2 September 1843. Accompanied by a mounted escort, the queen is visible in the carriage with other members of the royal party. Victoria attended the Château with her husband Prince Albert and the Foreign Secretary Lord Aberdeen, as part of the growing friendship between the countries. It was the first foreign visit for the young Victoria and marked the first time a reigning English monarch had visited France since Henry VIII at the Field of the Cloth of Gold in 1520.

It was one of four paintings depicting various scenes of the visit, commissioned to commemorate the event by Louis Phillipe. Today the painting is in the collection of the Palace of Versailles. A watercolour of the scene by Lami is now in the British Royal Collection, having been presented to Victoria by Louis Phillipe in 1844 when he made a reciprocal visit to Windsor Castle.

== See also ==
- The Arrival of King Louis Philippe at Windsor Castle, an 1845 painting by Édouard Pingret

== Bibliography ==
- Lemoisne, Paul-André. Eugène Lami: 1800–1890. H. Champion, 1914, 1914
- Price, Munro. The Perilous Crown: France Between Revolutions, 1814–1848. Pan Macmillan, 2010.
