= The Arrival of King Louis Philippe at Windsor Castle =

Painting by Édouard Pingret]

The Arrival of King Louis-Philippe at Windsor Castle
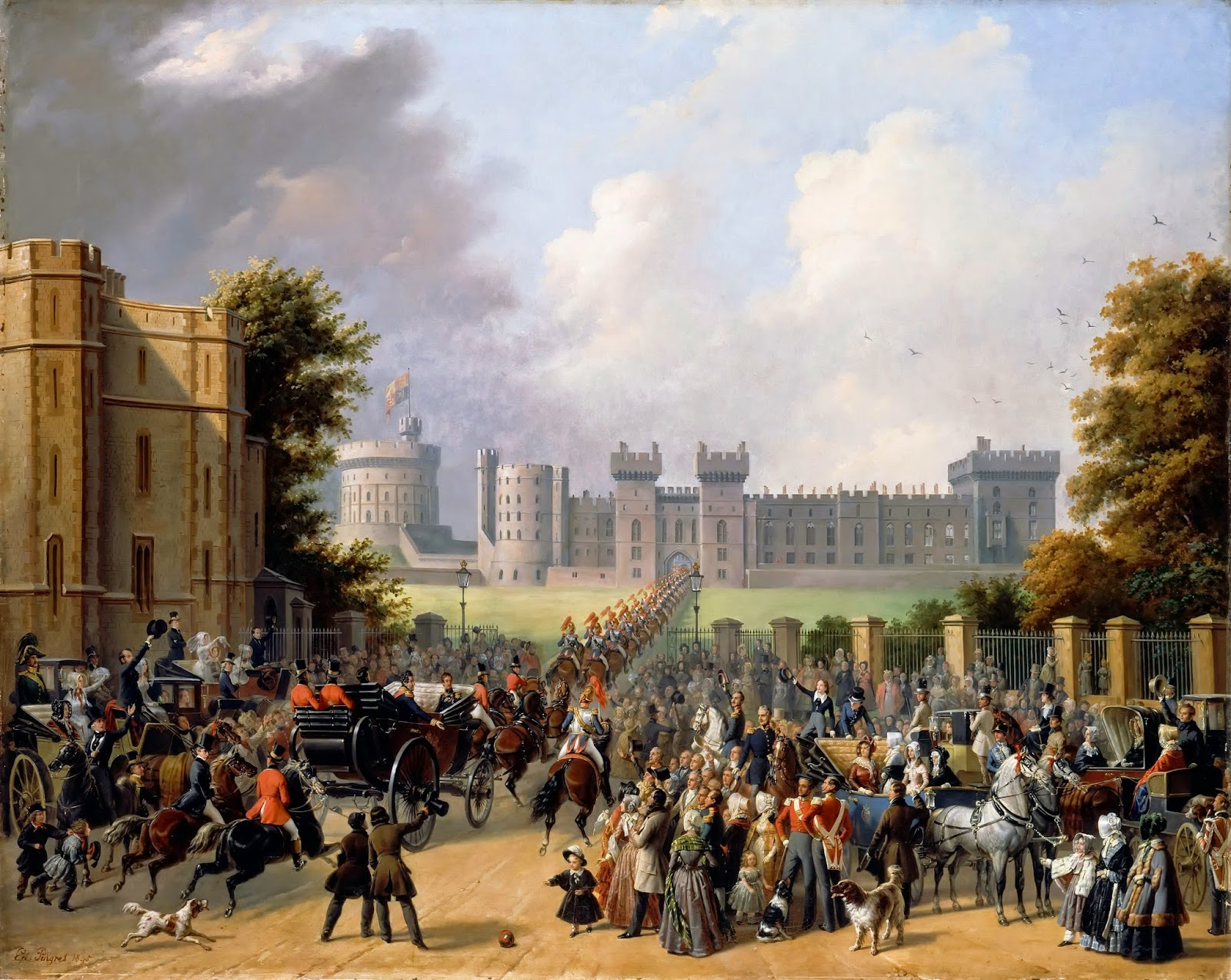
- Artist: Édouard Pingret
- Year: 1845
- Type: Oil on canvas, history painting
- Dimensions: 120 cm × 160 cm (47 in × 63 in)
- Location: Palace of Versailles; Versailles

The Arrival of King Louis Philippe at Windsor Castle (French: Arrivée de Louis-Philippe et de son fils le duc de Montpensier au château de Windsor) is an oil on canvas history painting by the French artist Édouard Pingret, from 1845.

== History and description ==
It depicts the visit of the French monarch Louis Philippe I to Queen Victoria at Windsor Castle on 8 October 1844. The Anglophile King of the French Louis Phillipe had been brought to the throne by the Revolution of 1830 in Paris. He was repaying a return visit to Victoria who had met him in Normandy the previous year, a scene recorded in the painting The Arrival of Queen Victoria at the Château d'Eu by Eugène Lami.

As well as Louis Phillipe, the painting features his son, the Duke of Montpensier as well as Victoria's husband Prince Albert. The French king paid the artist 1200 francs for the painting. The work was displayed at the Salon of 1845 at the Louvre, in Paris. The painting is in the collection of the Musée de l'Histoire de France at the Palace of Versailles.

== Bibliography ==
- Macedo, Luis Ortez. Edouard Pingret: un pintor romántico francés que retrató el México del mediar del siglo XIX. Fomento Cultural Banamex, 1989.
- Price, Munro. The Perilous Crown: France Between Revolutions, 1814-1848. Pan Macmillan, 2010.
