= The Caliph of Constantine =

Painting by Théodore Chassériau

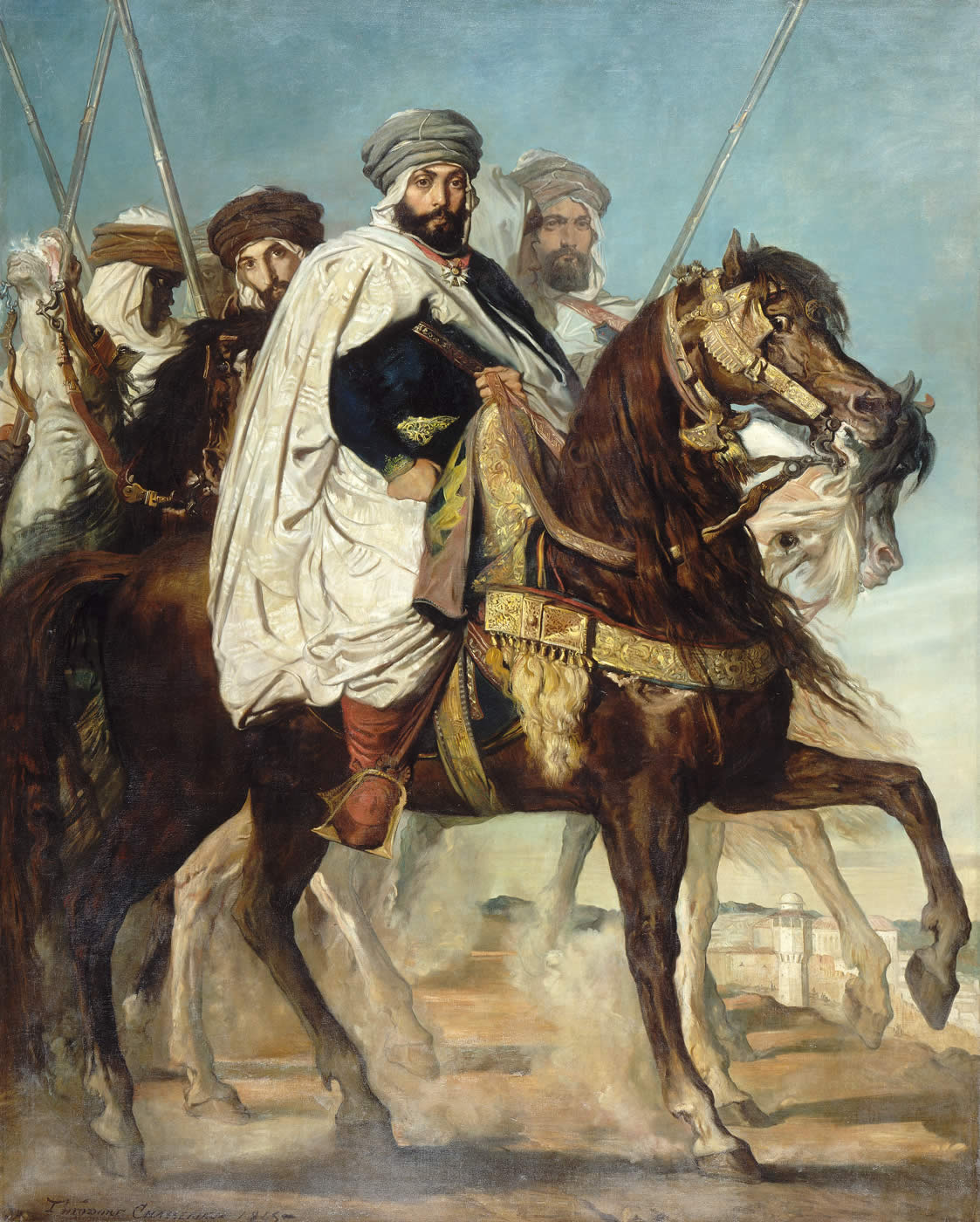
- Artist: Théodore Chassériau
- Year: 1845
- Medium: oil on canvas
- Dimensions: 325 cm × 259 cm (128 in × 102 in)
- Location: Palace of Versailles; Versailles

The Caliph of Constantine, full title, Ali Ben-Hamet, Caliph de Constantine and Chief of the Haractas, Followed by his Escort, is an oil-on-canvas painting by the French artist Théodore Chassériau. It is held at the Palace of Versailles.

== Description ==
This painting in the orientalist style is a good example of the "passion for color and movement" that gripped Chasseriau at this time. The equestrian portrait represents Ali Ben Ahmed, the leader of the Haraktas, in Algeria, who had invited Chassériau during his visit to Paris. He appears triumphantly riding his brown horse, followed by four members of his tribe, one of them black, also riding horses and holding spears. Clouds of dust rise from the horses' hooves.

== Critical reception ==
The painting was exhibited at the Salon of 1845, where it received mixed reviews. Chassériau was accused of doing a "harmful imitation of the art of Delacroix", although the painting was described as "full of grandeur and majesty". He was also accused of a lack of science and firmness in the depiction of the horses, and was criticized for the way he painted the limbs of the leading horse in the foreground.
