= Last Words of the Executed =

2010 Book by Robert K. Elder

- Author: Robert K. Elder
- Language: English
- Genre: Non-fiction
- Publication date: 2010

Last Words of the Executed is a book by Robert K. Elder published in 2010. Studs Terkel contributed a foreword. The book documents the final words of death row inmates in the United States, from the seventeenth century to the present day. The chapters are organized by era and method of execution. In each case, Elder also provides short descriptions of the inmates’ backgrounds and purported crimes.

== Chapters ==
- The Noose
- The Firing Squad
- The Electric Chair
- The Gas Chamber
- Lethal Injection

== Press ==
Bryan Appleyard of the Sunday Times of London warns, "This is, in short bursts, a fascinating book. But, having read it almost in one go, I must warn you that it is also depressing...So take it easy." Rob Warden, executive director of the Center on Wrongful Convictions, said, “This is a powerful, haunting book. Whether you favor or oppose the death penalty, you won’t think the same way after reading the last words of the condemned.”
