= The Sultan of Morocco =

1845 painting by Eugène Delacroix

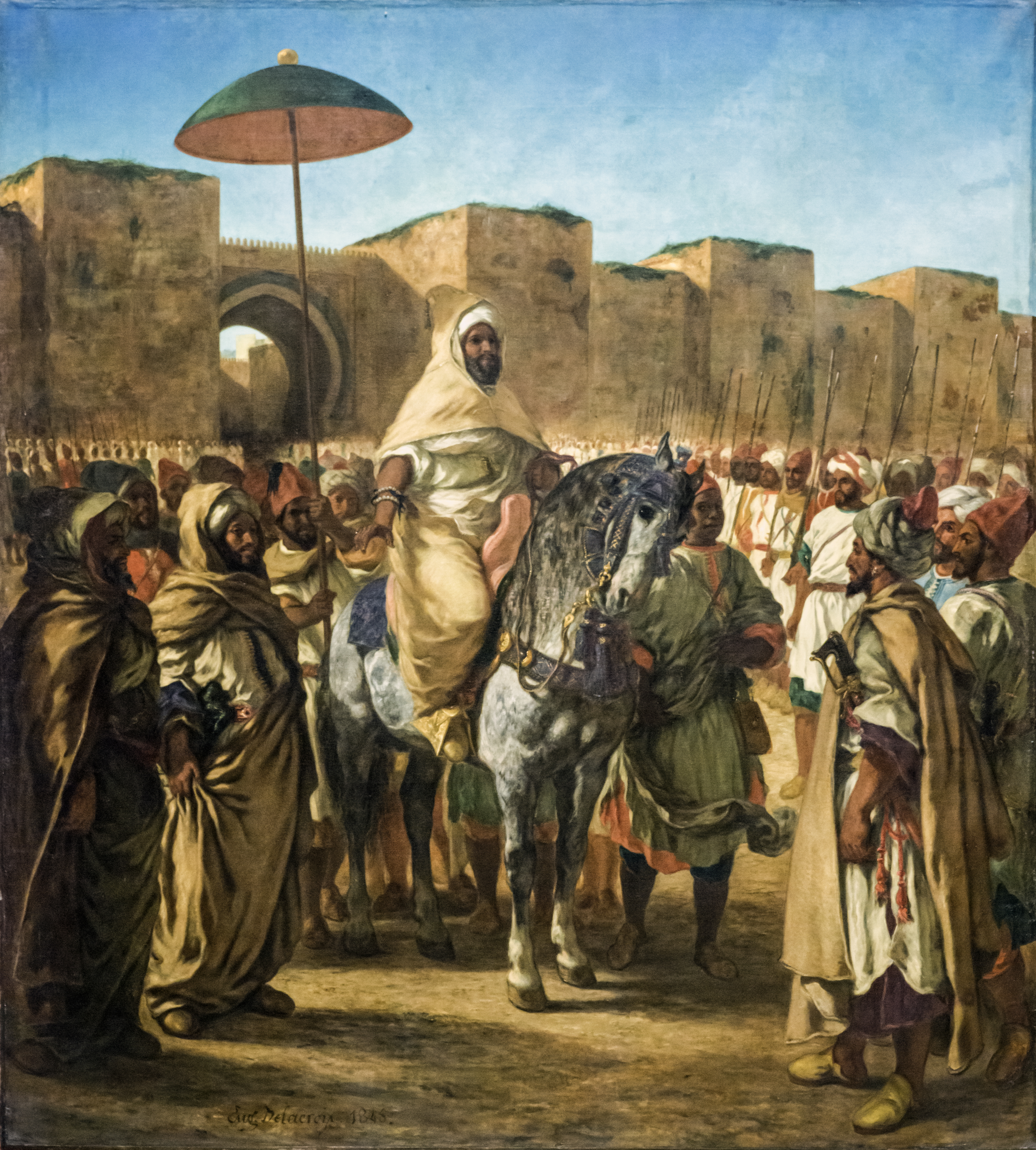
The Sultan of Morocco (1845) by Eugène Delacroix

The Sultan of Morocco is an 1845 oil-on-canvas painting by the French Romantic and Orientalist painter Eugène Delacroix, now in the Musée des Augustins de Toulouse. Its full title is Moulay Abd-Er-Rahman, Sultan of Morocco, leaving his palace of Meknès, surrounded by his guards and his principal officers. It shows Sultan Abd al-Rahman of Morocco departing his palace on horseback, towering above an entourage of his attendants and military officers with the grand gate of Meknes in the background of the composition.

Initially meant to commemorate French ambassador de Mornay in his delegation with the Sultan, The Sultan of Morocco excludes de Mornay and elevates the Sultan as the primary subject. It showcases Delacroix's practice of blending Romanticism and Classicism in some of his paintings of North Africa. Exhibited at the Salon of 1845 and preceded in 1844 by the Franco-Moroccan War, the painting generated scholarly debate regarding its artistic intentions and political meanings.

== Background ==
After France invaded Algeria in 1830, the reigning French monarch, Louis-Philippe, sent an ambassador, Charles Edgar de Mornay, to Morocco in 1832 in order to prevent the conflict from spreading there and ease the fears of the Sultan of Morocco, Moulay Abd-er Rahman. Eugène Delacroix was elected to accompany de Mornay on this mission, and this journey to Morocco became a turning point in his painting career, changing the subjects, ideas, details, and colors of his future work.

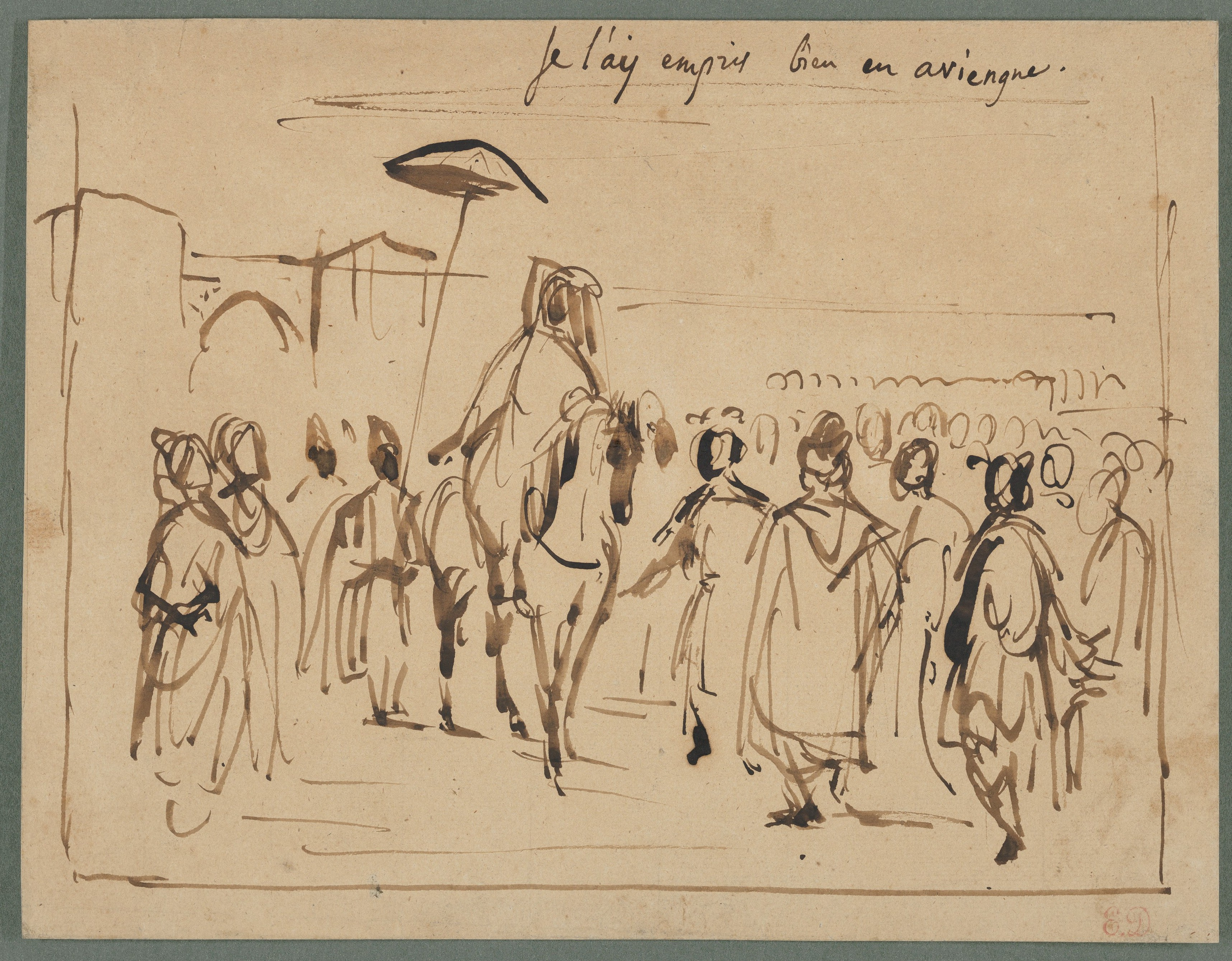
Study for The Sultan of Morocco and His Entourage, 1832-33; includes the ambassador Charles Edgar de Mornay

In his initial sketches from 1832,The Sultan of Morocco was originally meant to celebrate and highlight de Mornay as he successfully met with the Sultan, but Delacroix deemed the event insignificant and chose to depict an open-air scene with the monumental Sultan as its protagonist.

When The Sultan of Morocco was presented at the Salon of 1845, it was accompanied by a catalogue note and extensive title. This unusually long note included comprehensive character profiles and ceremony details to provide a "required authenticity" to the painting as a precise, historical, eye-witness account. The note and many accompanying writings on the subject suggest that Delacroix intended to situate this painting in a travel book or series of articles.

== Analysis ==
Lee Johnson discusses the increased realism and accurate natural lighting effects that appear in Delacroix's North African paintings. This sentiment was earlier expressed by the 19th century art critic Théophile Thoré, who stated that Delacroix's figures did not seem embellished nor dramatized, but rather remain "calm and noble, as tranquil Orientals should be," exemplifying "magnificence and grandeur in simplicity." Inspired by the intense Barbary sun, Delacroix used expressive brushwork to capture the vivid blue sky, rich earth tones, and distinctive parasol.

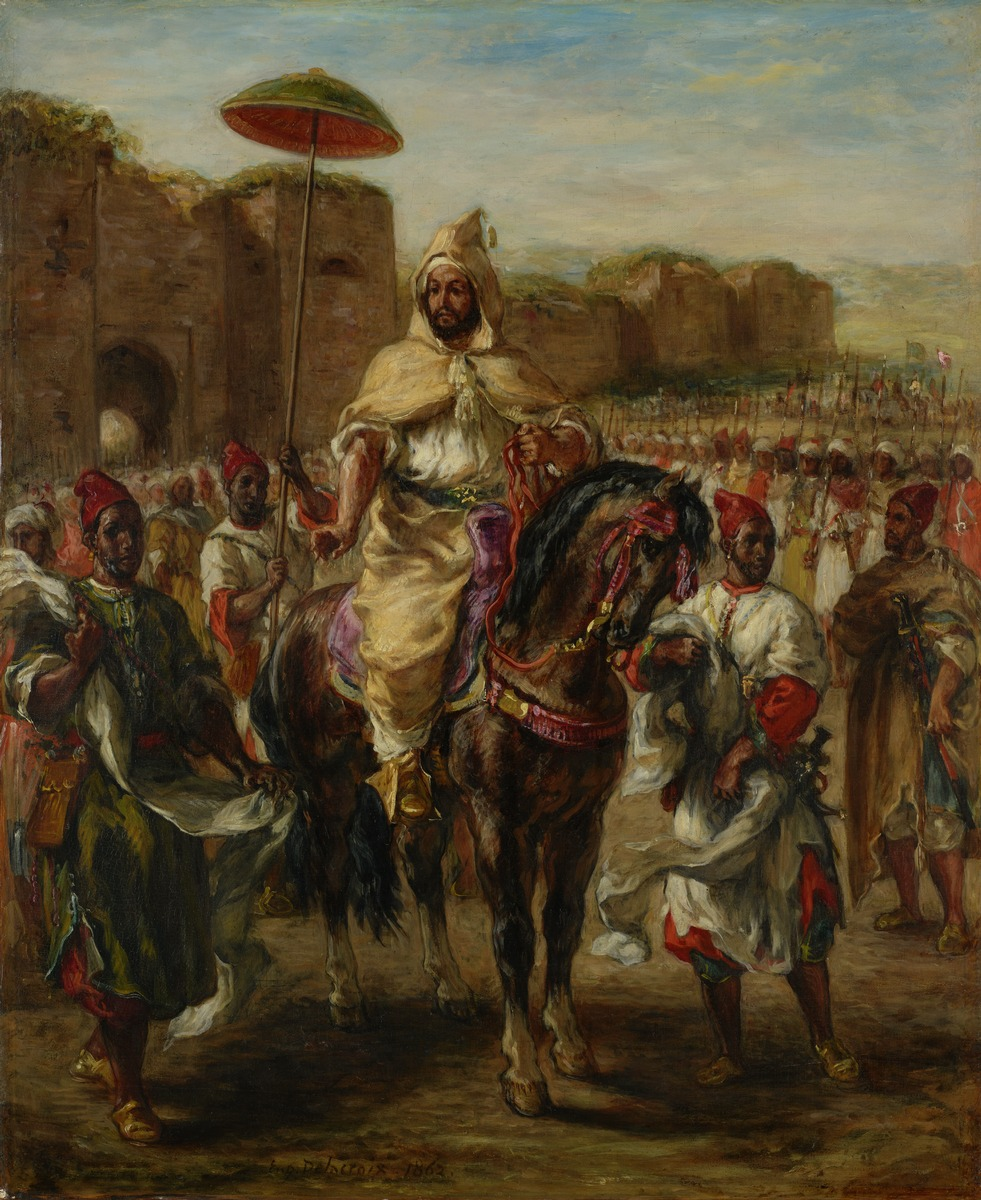
Eugène Delacroix, The Sultan of Morocco and his Entourage, 1862

Delacroix originally sought documentary accuracy and detail in this work, but he produced later versions of the same scene in 1856 and 1862 that reduced this detail in order to pursue "the poetic side" of his subject. Despite his initial desire for accuracy, Delacroix took much artistic license in the overall organization and individual elements of his subject. According to Ferrer, Delacroix was disappointed by the blandness of the gate and the paleness of the Sultan's appearance, which was not exotic enough for him, leading him to "correct" these issues in his final painting.

Another key trait of Delacroix's Moroccan paintings was the mixing of classical tradition with Orientalism and a Romantic sensibility, and this integration of multiple artistic traditions is exemplified in The Sultan of Morocco. The exotic subject and vibrant blend of strong colors are consistent with Romanticism, while the clarity of design and bold figures are more in keeping with Classical and Renaissance influences. In particular, the composition of the painting with the grand architecture of the main gate across the background aligns with the monumental tradition of the Italian Renaissance.

== Political context ==
In 1844, the French military successfully attacked Morocco to disrupt their support of the Algerian resistance against France. Scholars have debated how Delacroix's painting relates to this political context. On one hand, Johnson indicates that Delacroix painted this scene of de Mornay's reception by the Sultan without de Mornay himself as a tribute to the Sultan. Nochlin and Trapp contested this claim by stating that the painting shows the Sultan as "'aloof and uninviting,'" with "'implacable hostility,'" and that the work as a whole was a triumphalist piece with imperialist undertones.

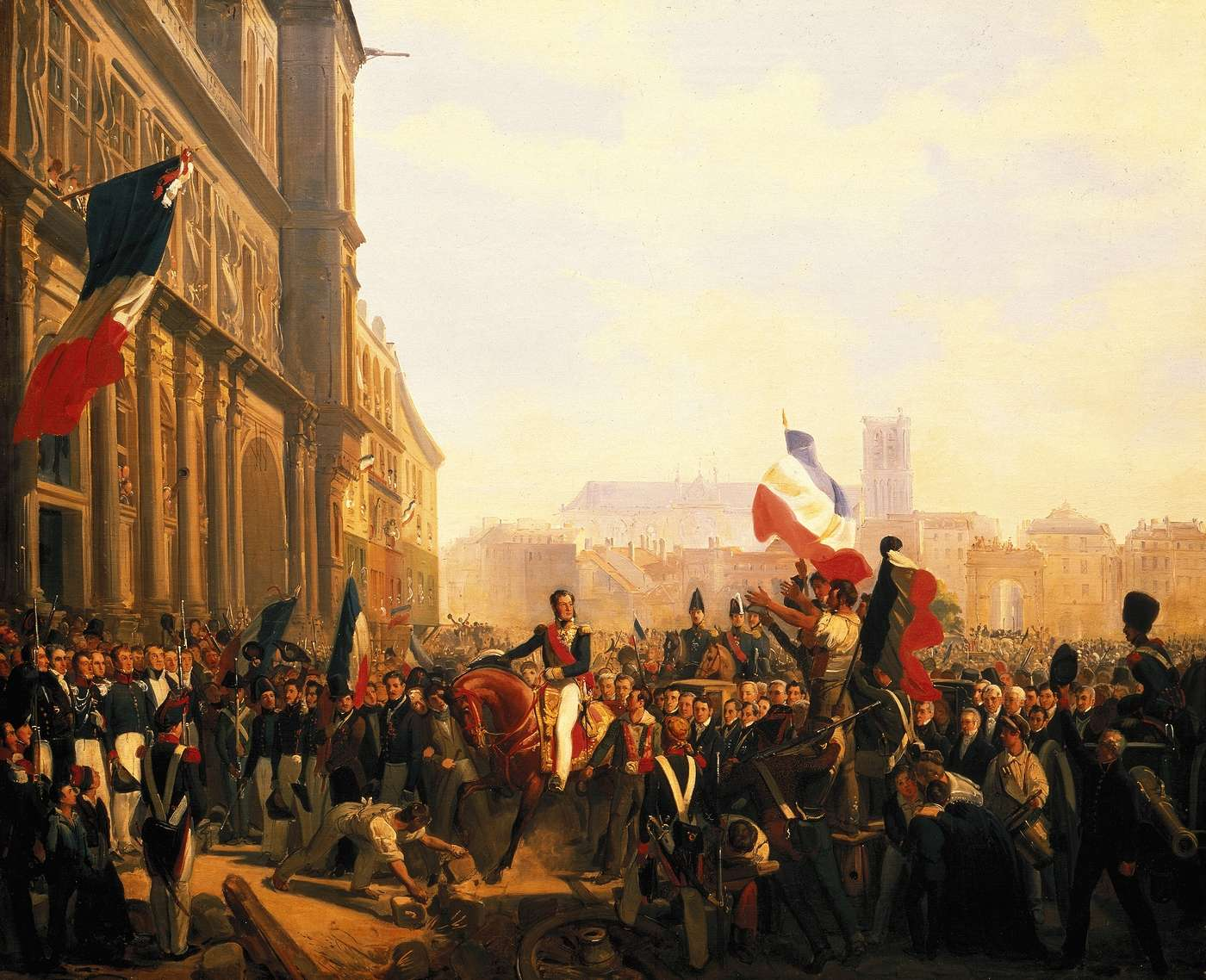
Charles-Philippe Larivière, The Arrival of the Duke of Orleans at the Hôtel de Ville, 1836

Olmstead states that Delacroix presents the Sultan as an autonomous and powerful ally of France. His power is displayed through the massive canvas, grandiose scale and setting, and his position towering over his attendants on horseback in a reference to similar imagery of Louis-Philippe. The autonomy of the Sultan can be seen in the distinctive Moroccan details, such as the prayer beads, brilliant blue sky, and djellabas worn by the figures, as well as the elimination of the French delegation from the painting. Olmstead therefore claims that The Sultan of Morocco challenges the status quo and stands against the various French imperialist political positions of the day.
