= Famous Last Words =

Famous Last Words may refer to:

- List of last words, collection of last words attributed to historical figures before their death

== Music ==
- Famous Last Words (band), an American metal band

=== Albums ===
- Famous Last Words, by 3 Stories High, 1991
- Famous Last Words (Al Stewart album), 1993
- Famous Last Words (Hedley album), 2007
- Famous Last Words (M album), 1982
- ...Famous Last Words..., by Supertramp, 1982
- Famous Last Words, by Captain Tractor, 2011
- Famous Last Words, by Casisdead, 2023

=== Songs ===
- "Famous Last Words" (My Chemical Romance song), 2007
- "Famous Last Words" (Tears for Fears song), 1990
- "Famous Last Words", by Billy Joel from River of Dreams
- "Famous Last Words", by Deerhunter from Rainwater Cassette Exchange
- "Famous Last Words", by James Blake from Friends That Break Your Heart
- "Famous Last Words", by Jars of Clay from If I Left the Zoo
- "Famous Last Words", by Lowgold from Welcome to Winners
- "Famous Last Words", by Sole from Bottle of Humans
- "Famous Last Words", by Ty Dolla Sign from Beach House 3
- "Famous Last Words", by Zeromancer from Zzyzx
- "Famous Last Words (An Ode to Eaters)", by 1017 ALYX 9SM and Ethel Cain

== Television ==
=== Series ===
- Famous Last Words (TV series), a 2025 TV series on Netflix

=== Episodes ===
- "Famous Last Words" (Buddies)
- "Famous Last Words" (Castle)
- "Famous Last Words" (Oz)
- "Famous Last Words" (Touched by an Angel)

== Other uses ==
- Famous Last Words (novel), a 1981 novel by Timothy Findley
- Famous Last Words, a cartoon series by Irwin Caplan
- Famous Last Words, a 2007 film starring Jan Uddin (as Jan Dean)

== See also ==
- "Famous Last Words of a Fool", a song by George Strait
- Last words (disambiguation)
- The Last Word (disambiguation)
