= The Capture of the Smala of Abd El-Kader =

Painting by Horace Vernet

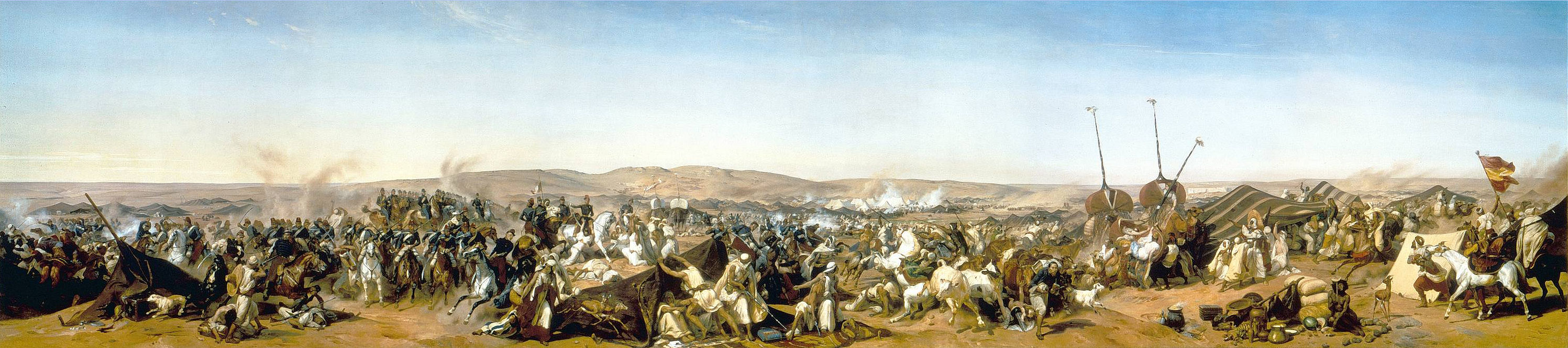
The Capture of the Smala of Abd El-Kader (1844) by Horace Vernet

The Capture of the Smala of Abd El-Kader, 16 May 1843 is an oil on canvas painting of the Duc d'Aumale's victory over Emir Abdelkader's 'smala' (encampment) at Taguin on 16 May 1843. It was commissioned just after the battle by Aumale's father Louis-Philippe I and completed less than two years later, assisted by his pupils. It was exhibited at the 1845 and 1855 Paris Salons and is now in the Musée de l'histoire de France in Versailles.

== Description ==
At 21.39 m wide and 4.89 m high, it is the largest painting of the 19th century.

In the first level of the work Aumale is shown on a white horse, recalling that of Napoleon I in Napoleon on the Battlefield of Eylau. In the third level, in the distance, is the old fort of Taguin and to the right the family of Mohamed-el-Karoubi, marabout and chancellor to Abdelkader, who was not present in person on the day of the battle. It was widely published in engravings, including a lithograph in 1845 by Bernard-Romain Julien, whilst Alfred Decaen produced a copy measuring 1.4 m by 4.5 m in 1856, which is now in the Musée Condé at the château de Chantilly. It is also mentioned in Le Sâr Rabindranath Duval, a sketch by Pierre Dac and Francis Blanche.
