= The Last Word (Malaysian TV series) =

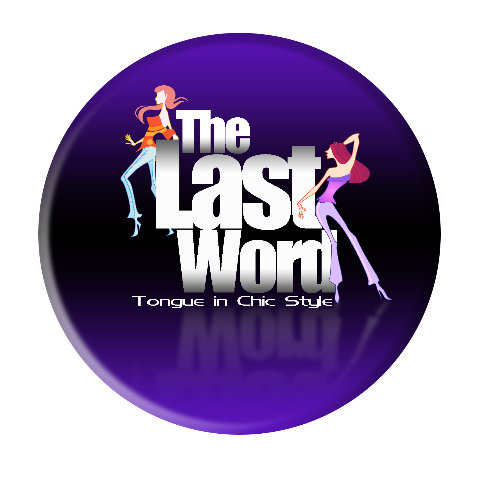
- Tongue In Chic Style
- Created by: Kassandra Kassim
- Presented by: Stephanie Chai
- Country of origin: Malaysia
- No. of episodes: 3

Production
- Running time: 22 minutes

Original release
- Network: Bernama TV
- Release: June 19, 2010 – present

The Last Word is a Malaysian television lifestyle show created by Kassandra Kassim and hosted by Stephanie Chai that airs on Bernama TV. Each episode explores hip restaurants, exciting venues, and behind the scenes footage at the most exclusive media, fashion, and entertainment events present in Kuala Lumpur.

== Format ==
The show consists of various segments dedicated to exploring facets of Kuala Lumpur life. Each segment which are each a few minutes long explores one dedicated topic such as fashion, food, or awards.

=== Featured segments ===
- Eye Witness: Focuses on either the Malaysian national pastime; eating, Fashion, or Creativity. In the past this has included coverage of restaurants such as Bijan Bar, Reunion (Chinese), and Bombay Palace (Indian). Also the MODA (Malaysian Official Designers Association) 20th Anniversary gala, and a showcase for upcoming Malaysian designers were covered.
- Word on the Street: Local events
- The KL Establishment: Interviews with established members of KL society
- Medal of Honor: Awards for local businesses
- Fashion Emergency: Makeover
- We the Jury: Fashion Critique

== Episodes ==
=== Season 1 (2010) ===
No. overall	No. in season	Title	Original release date
1	1	"Pilot"	June 19, 2010
Pilot Episode
2	2	"The Ultimate Sunday"	July 17, 2010
3	3	"Friday"	August 2010
