= Comet Donati =

Non-periodic comet

C/1858 L1 (Donati) (Great Comet of 1858)
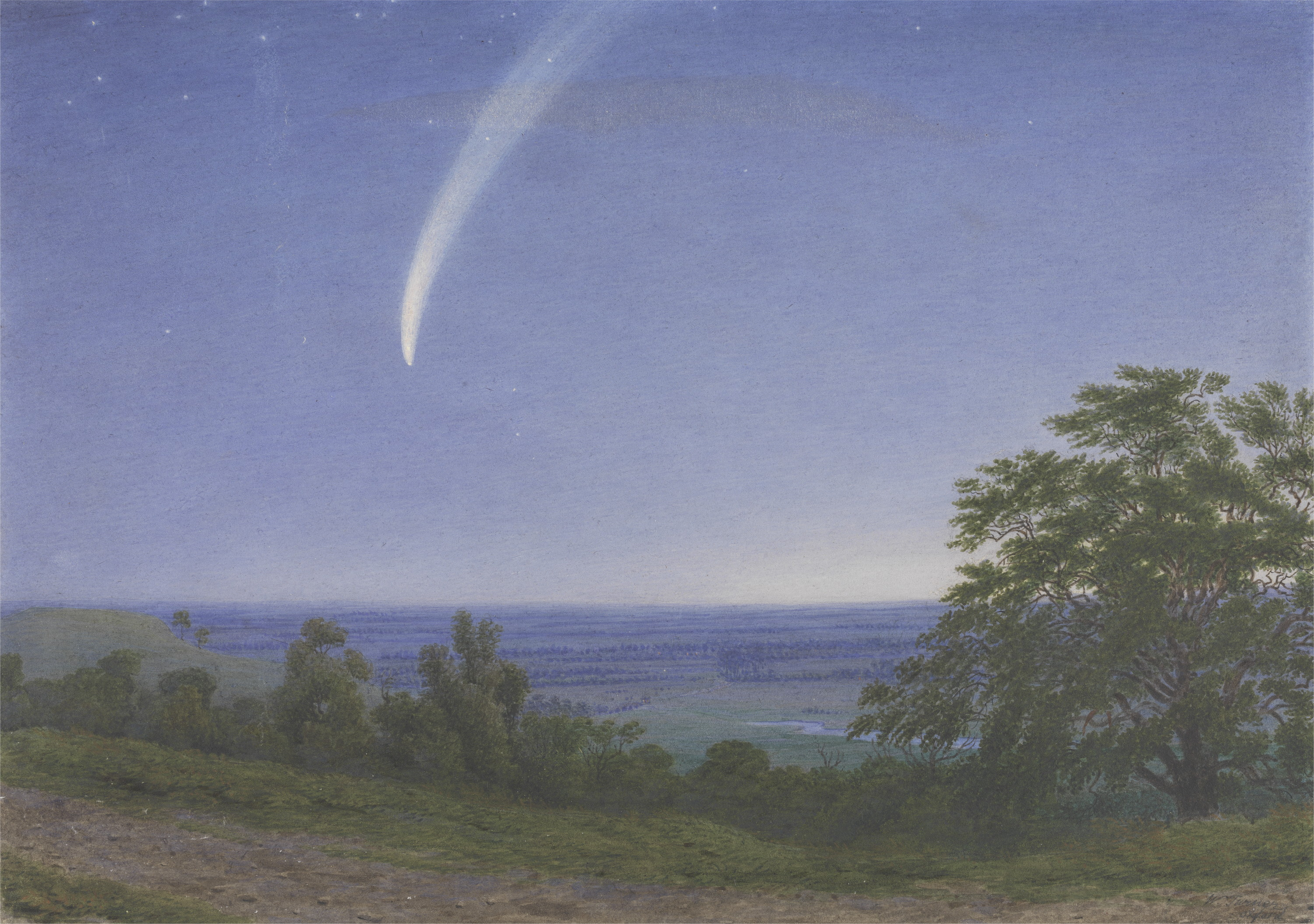
- Donati's Comet, Oxford, 7:30 p.m., 5 Oct. 1858 by [William Turner of Oxford]

Discovery
- Discovered by: Giovanni Battista Donati
- Discovery date: 1858

Designations
- Alternative designations: 1858 VI

Orbital characteristics
- Epoch: 8 October 1858 (JD 2399960.5)
- Observation arc: 270 days
- Number of observations: 1,000
- Aphelion: ~289 AU
- Perihelion: 0.578 AU
- Semi-major axis: ~145 AU
- Eccentricity: 0.996295
- Orbital period: ~1,739 yr (outbound)
- Inclination: 116.951°
- Longitude of ascending node: 167.304°
- Argument of periapsis: 129.144°
- Last perihelion: 30 September 1858
- Next perihelion: ≈3600
- T_{Jupiter}: –0.394

Physical characteristics
- Mean radius: 2.96 km (1.84 mi) (Note: Calculated mean radius using the formula: $\log_{10}\,(\,R\,)\ =\;0.9 +\;0.13 (\,H\,)$ Where $\,H\,$ is the comet's absolute total magnitude (M1))
- Synodic rotation period: 4.6 hours
- Comet total magnitude (M1): 3.3
- Apparent magnitude: 0.0–1.0 (1858 apparition)

Comet Donati, or Donati's Comet, formally designated C/1858 L1 and 1858 VI, is a long-period comet named after the Italian astronomer Giovanni Battista Donati who first observed it on June 2, 1858. After the Great Comet of 1811, it was the most brilliant comet that appeared in the 19th century. It was also the first comet to be photographed.

== Discovery and observations ==
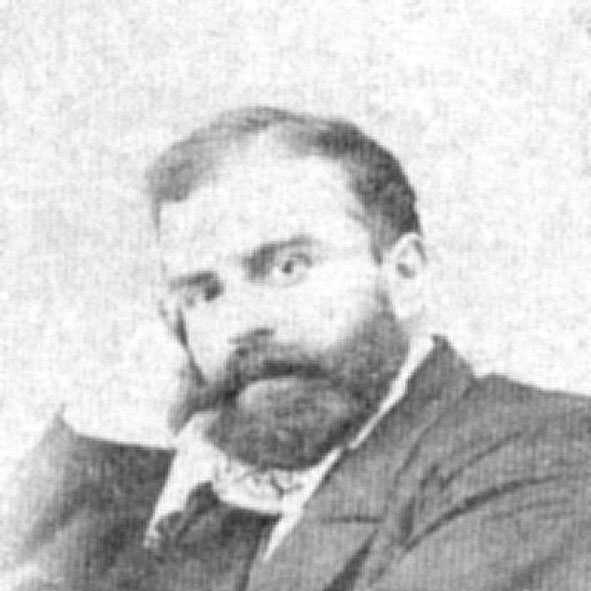
Donati, the comet's discoverer.

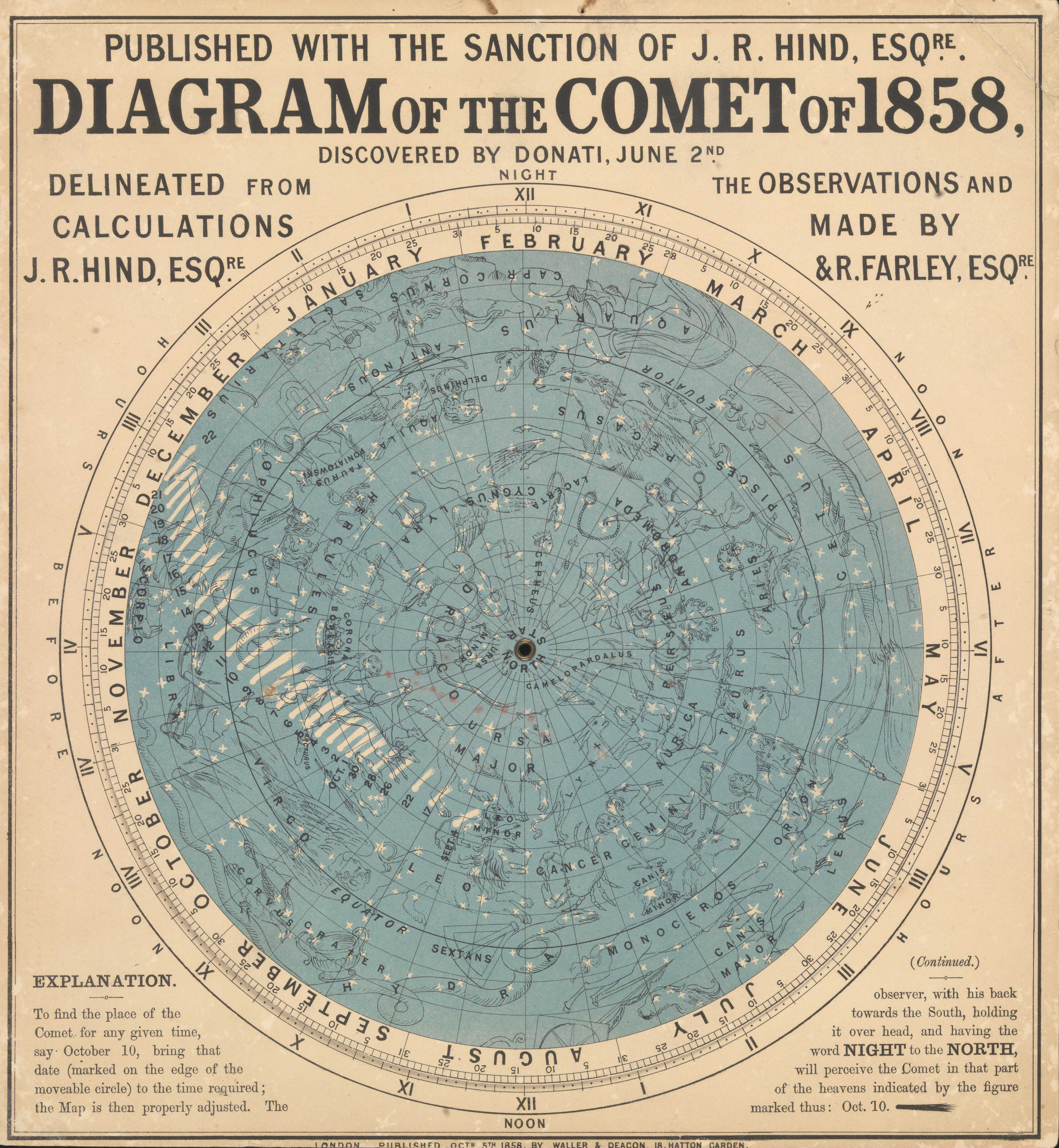
Diagram for locating the comet, printed a week before nearest approach.

Donati first observed the comet on 2 June from the Florence Observatory: it was initially visible as a small nebula-like object of magnitude 7 near the "head" of Leo. By mid-August it had brightened sufficiently to be visible to the naked eye.

In September it passed into Ursa Major. For much of its apparition it occupied a unique position (among great comets) in the sky and was particularly well placed for Northern Hemisphere viewers.

It was nearest the Earth on October 10, 1858, and for much of October was a brilliant object with a long, scimitar-like dust tail and prominent gas tail. It remained a naked-eye object until November for Southern Hemisphere observers. The final observation was by William Mann, chief assistant at the Royal Observatory, Cape of Good Hope, who detected it as a faint nebulosity on March 4, 1859.

During its apparition the comet was particularly closely studied by the astronomer George Phillips Bond and his father William Cranch Bond. G. P. Bond incorporated these observations and those of many other astronomers into a monograph, An Account of the Great Comet of 1858, which remains his most important scientific work and for which he was awarded the Gold Medal of the Royal Astronomical Society, being the first American to receive the award.

=== Comet photographed ===
Donati's Comet was successfully photographed on September 27 by W. Usherwood, a portrait photographer at Walton-on-the-Hill, Surrey, using a 7-second exposure with an f/2.4 portrait lens, the first time a comet had been photographed. Usherwood's photograph, which is in archival storage at Harvard College Observatory’s Astronomical Photographic Glass Plate Collection at the Center for Astrophysics, showed the bright region around the comet's nucleus and a part of the tail. G. P. Bond also successfully photographed the comet on September 28 at Harvard College Observatory, the first comet photograph through a telescope. He made several attempts with increasing exposure times, finally achieving a discernible image. He later wrote, "only the nucleus and a little nebulosity 15" in diameter acted on the plate in an exposure of six minutes".

=== Orbital calculations ===
Barycentric orbital periods when outside planetary perturbations
	Epoch 1600	Epoch 2200
Orbital period	1966 yr	1739 yr
Orbital eccentricity	0.9963	0.9960
Aphelion	313 AU	289 AU

Orbits for the comet were calculated by Friedrich Emil von Asten and George William Hill, the latter's based on nearly 1000 positions. The comet had an orbital inclination of 116.9°. With an epoch 2200 barycentric orbital period approximated at 1739 years, it is estimated that Donati's Comet will not be seen passing by Earth again until somewhere around the year 3600. As of 2023, JPL Horizons estimates that the comet is 147 AU (22 billion km) from the Sun and continuing to move away from the Sun at 2.4 km/s (5,400 mph).

The comet's orbit lies very close to that of Venus, with the minimum intersection distance being 0.0047 astronomical units (700,000 km; 440,000 mi), which is smallest known distance a great comet can approach a terrestrial planet. It is possible the comet produces a strong meteor shower at the northern hemisphere.

== In art and culture ==
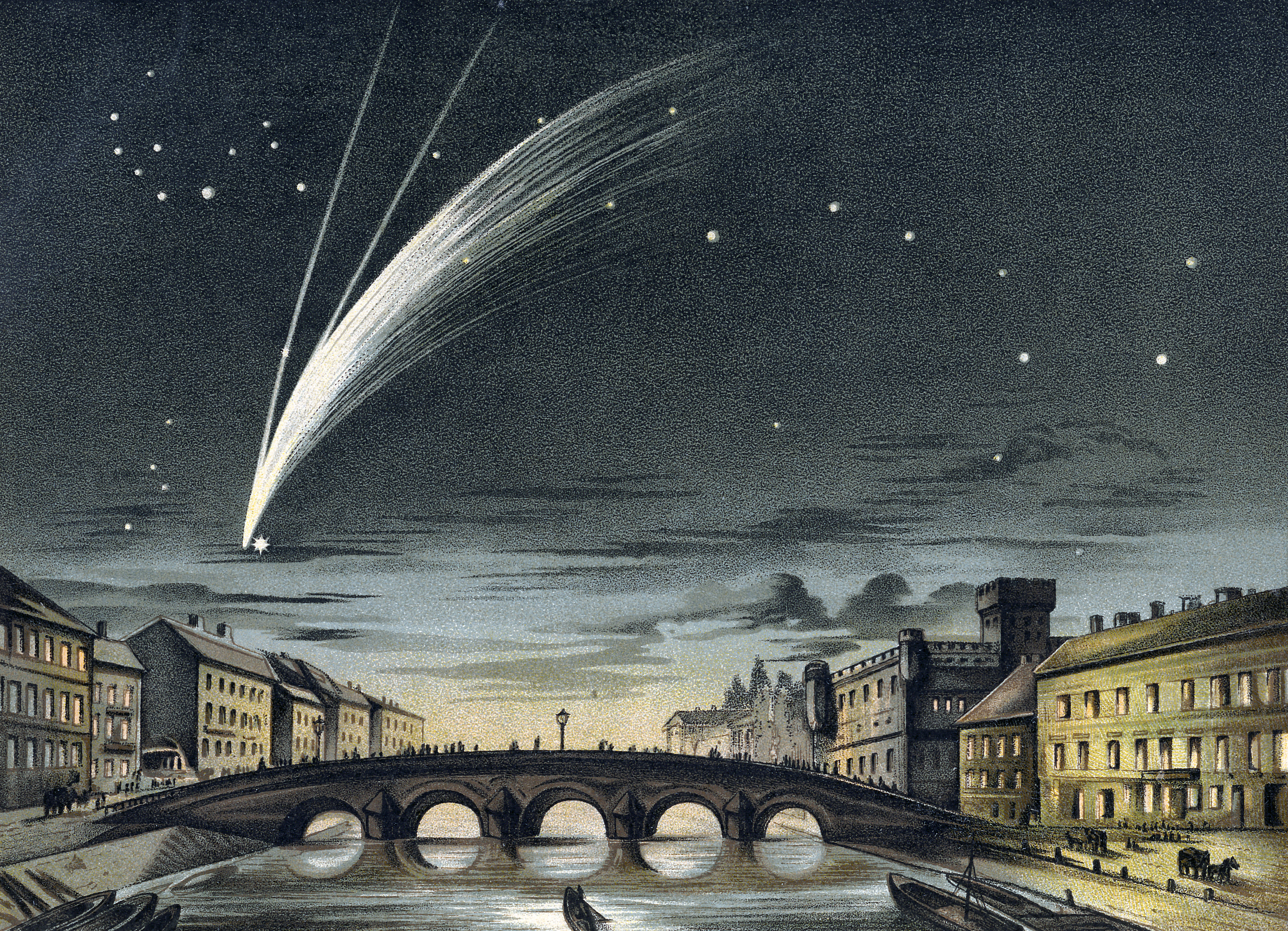
The comet with both gas and dust tails depicted.

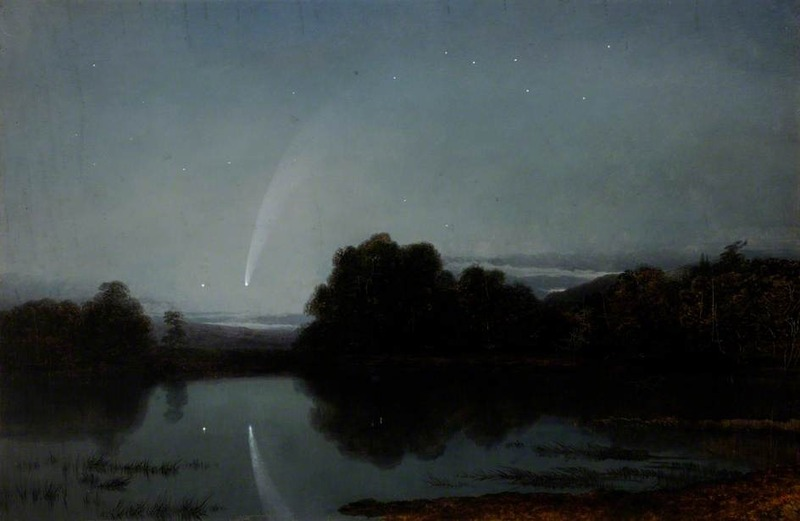
Donati's Comet inspired a large number of artists, such as James Poole.

Donati's Comet is considered to be one of the most beautiful comets observed, and was one of the brightest of the century, making a strong impression both on artists and the general public. After a prior period of hysteria on the subject of comets, especially in Paris (caused partly by incorrect calculations by John Russell Hind which suggested that one would strike the Earth in June 1857) Donati's Comet went on to be the most-observed of the century due to its excellent visibility in dark skies for Northern Hemisphere viewers, particularly in Europe, and fine weather in September and October. William Henry Smyth, an English astronomer, recalled it as "one of the most beautiful objects that I have ever seen". Donati himself, a relatively obscure figure, was propelled to the status of an astronomical hero, and the comet helped cultivate a general enthusiasm for astronomy among the public.

Donati's Comet appears as a streak and star in the early evening sky of a painting by William Dyce, Pegwell Bay, Kent – a Recollection of October 5th 1858. It was featured in a number of sketches and at least one painting by William Turner of Oxford, and in a painting, "The Comet of 1858, as seen from the Heights of Dartmoor", by Samuel Palmer. The Comet at Yell'ham, a 1902 poem by Thomas Hardy, was inspired by his recollections of Donati's Comet.

Abraham Lincoln, then a candidate for a seat in the U.S. Senate, sat up on the porch of his hotel in Jonesboro, Illinois, to see "Donti's Comet" on September 14, 1858, the night before the third of his historic debates with Stephen Douglas.

In his journals of the Malay Archipelago, naturalist Alfred Russel Wallace writes of seeing the comet in October 1858 off the island of Tidore in Indonesia. "I observed what seemed a fire of remarkable whiteness on the very summit of the hill ... the magnificent comet which was at the same time, astonishing all Europe. The nucleus presented to the naked eye a distinct disc of brilliant white light, from which the tail rose at an angle of about 30° or 35° with the horizon, curving slightly downwards, and terminating in a broad brush of faint light, the curvature of which diminished till it was nearly straight at the end. The portion of the tail next the comet appeared three or four times as bright as the most luminous portion of the milky way, and what struck me as a singular feature was that its upper margin, from the nucleus to very near the extremity, was clearly and almost sharply defined, while the lower side gradually shaded off into obscurity."

The influence of the comet, particularly in visual and design terms, was such that traces of its appearance can be found in magazine and commercial illustrations, household objects, children's books and other items up until the early years of the 20th century.
