= Joash Shooting the Arrow of Deliverance =

Painting by William Dyce

- Artist: William Dyce
- Year: 1844
- Type: Oil on canvas, history painting
- Dimensions: 76.3 cm × 109.5 cm (30.0 in × 43.1 in)
- Location: Hamburger Kunsthalle, Hamburg

Joash Shooting the Arrow of Deliverance is an 1844 oil painting by the British artist William Dyce. It depicts a biblical scene from the Old Testament Book of Kings. The young King of Israel Jehoash of Israel is commanded by the prophet Elisha to fire an arrow to the east to symbolise their coming victory over from the forces of Syria.

The picture was displayed at the Royal Academy Exhibition of 1844 held at the National Gallery in London, where it was very well-received. Today the painting is the collection of the Hamburger Kunsthalle.

== Bibliography ==
- Boime, Albert. Art in an Age of Counterrevolution, 1815-1848. University of Chicago Press, 2004.
- Herrmann, Luke. Nineteenth Century British Painting. Charles de la Mare, 2000.
- Pointon, Marcia R. William Dyce, 1806-1864: A Critical Biography. Oxford University Press, 1979.
