= Meredith Jemima Brown =

Meredith Jemima Brown (25 October 1846 – 5 November 1908) was a Scottish social reformer from Aberdeen who founded the Shaftesbury Institute in London, which offered a safe space for young women arriving in the British capital.

== Early life ==
Brown was born in Glasgow in 1846. Her mother was Catherine Dyce, sister of painter William Dyce, and her father was Free Church minister Reverend David Brown. She was raised in Aberdeen and lived on Dee Street, and studied music and singing. After the death of her mother in the 1880s, Brown moved to London where she became concerned about conditions for young women working in factories and living in slums across the city.

== Career ==
After moving to London, Brown developed an interest in the harsh working conditions and poverty suffered by factory girls in the East End and also in the West End of the city. Brown and a friend disguised themselves as factory girls to visit slums in the West End, and Brown documented their experiences in the book Only a Factory Girl, which raised £2,000 (equivalent to £251,000 in 2023) that she used to purchase a property in Lisson Grove, where she founded the Shaftesbury Institute.

=== The Shaftesbury Institute ===
The Institute initially provided a safe night shelter for women and a crèche, which Brown expanded to provide Bible classes throughout the West End, a training home for girls and a men's labour home. Brown served as the superintendent and honorary president of the Institute, which was funded by charitable donations. Brown was described as:

"A very remarkable woman, full of faith and of consequent zeal, in the noble cause of benefiting her poor and degraded sisters," (The Times, 10 November 1908)

She continued to work on developing the Institute, including fundraising for new premises, until her death at the Shaftesbury Institute on 5 November 1908.
