= Pegwell Bay, Kent – a Recollection of October 5th 1858 =

1860 painting by William Dyce

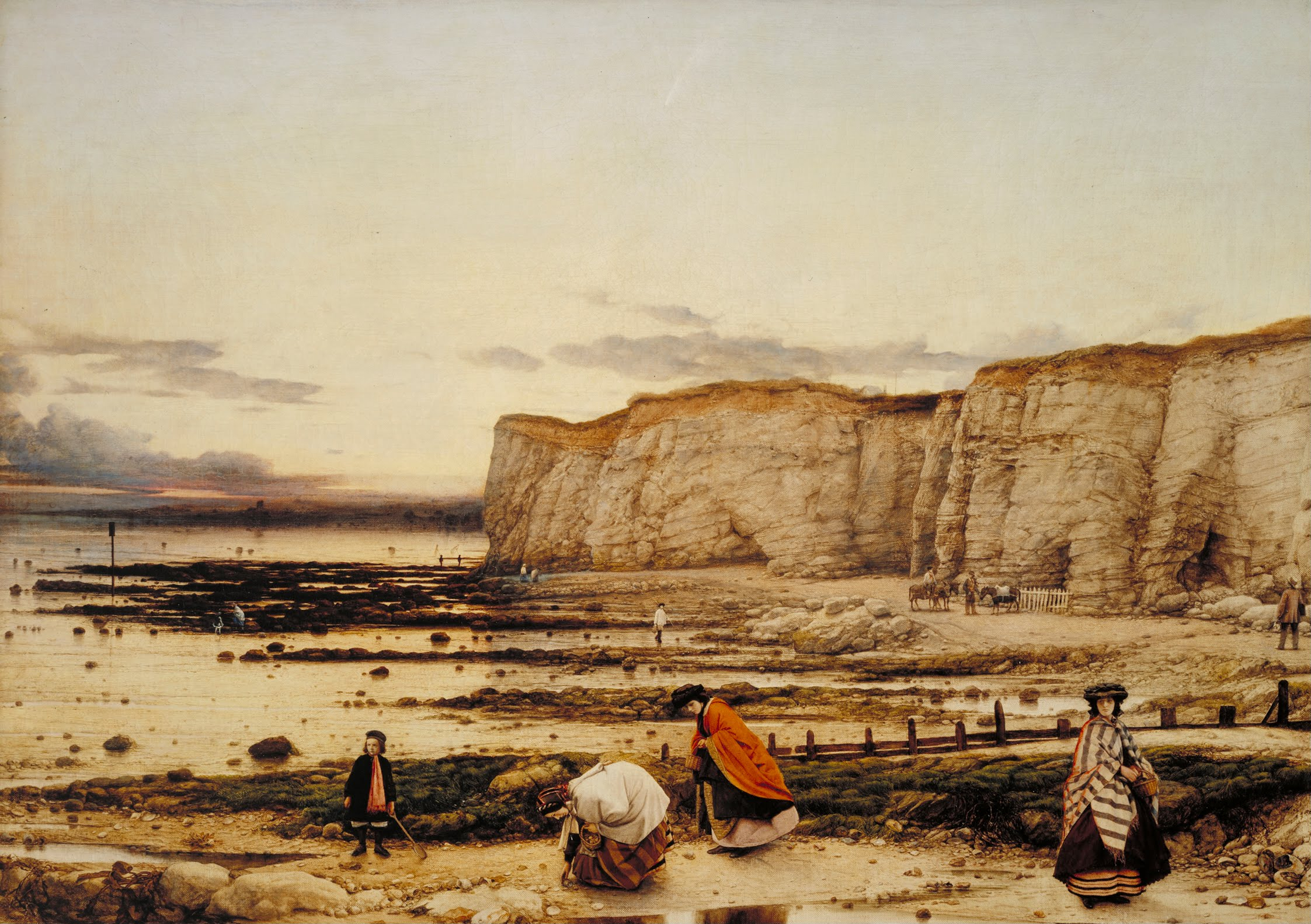
William Dyce, Pegwell Bay, Kent – a Recollection of October 5th 1858, 1860, Tate Britain.

Pegwell Bay, Kent – a Recollection of October 5th 1858 is an 1860 oil-on-canvas painting by British artist William Dyce, depicting the landscape at Pegwell Bay, on the east coast of Kent. Considered a Pre-Raphaelite work, Dyce employs a mode of heightened realism and intricate detail to create a powerful landscape. It is considered to be Dyce's best painting, and is held by the Tate Gallery.

The painting was inspired by a visit by the Dyce family to Pegwell Bay in August 1857. Pegwell Bay is a shallow inlet on the coast of Kent between Ramsgate and Sandwich, at the estuary of the River Stour, Kent. It was a popular Victorian holiday destination, with tea gardens and donkey rides. The bay was also a popular place for fossil hunters. The painting depicts Dyce's wife and her two sisters in the act of collecting shells and fossils on the beach. The white streak depicted in the sky is a depiction of Donati's Comet.

== Background ==
Dyce was born in Aberdeen, where his father was a doctor. An Anglo-Catholic, he had previously painted mainly portraits, religious paintings, and some murals in the rebuilt Houses of Parliament. Dyce was elected an Associate of the Royal Academy in 1844 and a full member of the Royal Academy of Arts in 1848.

== Painting ==
The painting was inspired by a visit by the Dyce family to Pegwell Bay in August 1857. Pegwell Bay is a shallow inlet on the coast of Kent between Ramsgate and Sandwich, at the estuary of the River Stour, Kent. It was a popular Victorian holiday destination, with tea gardens and donkey rides. The bay was also a popular place for fossil hunters.

In the painting, the tide has gone out, revealing a flat expanse of sand, pools of water, rocks, and algae. Standing separately in the foreground are Dyce's son with a spade looking out to sea, his wife, and her two sisters, collecting shells and fossils on the beach. The women are wrapped in shawls against the cool of the autumn evening. Smaller figures are hunting in rockpools in the background, with one taking a ride on a donkey. A male figure to the right, carrying artist's materials and looking up at the cliff, may be a self-portrait of Dyce himself. The setting sun gives the cliffs and beach a pink glow, but the scene remains bleak. Dyce was a keen geologist, and the strata of the cliffs behind the beach are carefully delineated. A white streak in the sky is Donati's Comet, and the painting's subtitle ("A Recollection of October 5th 1858") refers to "the day on which the comet appeared at its most brilliant and when its development was being recorded by astronomers all over Europe."

Dyce made initial studies on the beach, en plein air. A small watercolour study made in 1857 was acquired by Aberdeen Art Gallery in 1991, funded in part by the Art Fund. The completed oil painting depicts a later time in the evening than the study; Dyce also adds his family in the foreground of the final painting, and moves the date one year later to include the comet. The beach was frequented by Charles Darwin and his family, and On the Origin of Species was published in 1859, while Dyce was working on the painting.

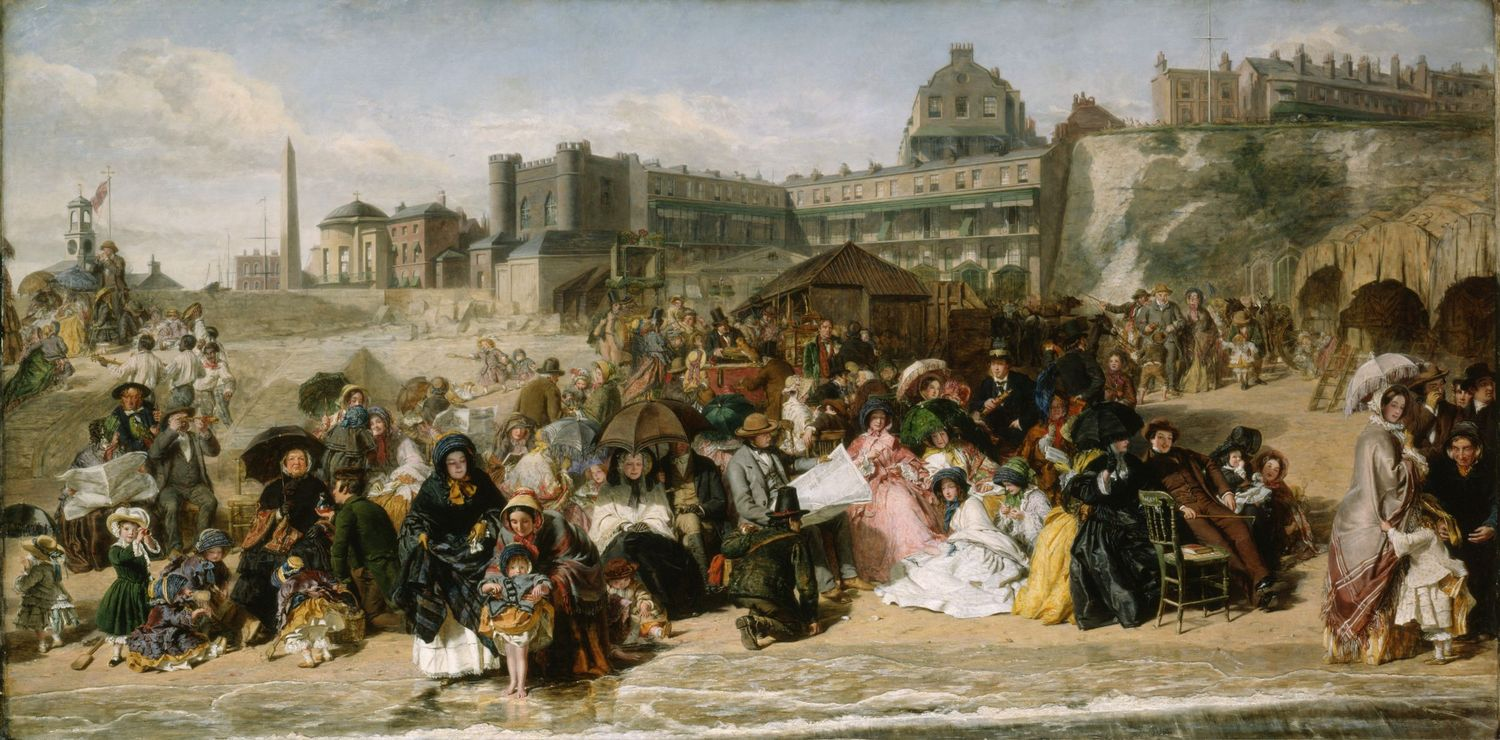
William Powell Frith, Life at the Seaside, also known as Ramsgate Sands,1854

The painting can be seen as an allegory of time and space, geology and astronomy, family and history, with science meeting Christianity on the beach: Pegwell Bay was reputedly the place where St Augustine landed in 597, on his mission to bring Christianity to the British Isles (and also where Hengist and Horsa arrived in the 5th century). The comet may be an echo of the Star of Bethlehem from the biblical nativity story, but could also be a reference to the science of astronomy and the place of humans in the universe.

Literary scholar and cultural historian Robin Gilmour describes the painting as expressing "the existential emptiness of this moment in history" in the wake of the vastly expanded understanding of geological time that had taken place in recent decades:

[Dyce] knew that Pegwell bay was particularly rich in fossils and the cliff's geological strata are painted with knowledge and precision. Here they dominate the human figures in the foreground. It is a family scene, but worlds away from the cheerful bustle of W. P. Frith's seaside paintings. ... Here Tennyson's two "terrible muses" [i.e., geology and astronomy] are brought together and seen in contrast to the human figures on the shore, who look vulnerable and lost: isolated, straying figures rather than a cheerful family group. Pegwell Bay is a unique capturing of the great gulf which was opening up in the nineteenth-century's experience of time, between the family album "recollection" of a visit to the seaside and the terrifying vastness of geological time and astronomical distance.

The finished painting measures 63.5 centimetres (25.0 in) by 89 centimetres (35 in). It was exhibited at the Royal Academy summer exhibition in 1860. It was so detailed that Dyce was accused of working from a photograph. In 1894 it was purchased by the Tate Gallery, where it remains.

== See also ==
- William Powell Frith's 1854 seaside painting, Ramsgate Sands
