= King's Book =

King's Book can refer to:

- Codex Regius, translated into English as "King's Book", an Icelandic manuscript
- The "King's Book", a predecessor to the Thirty-nine Articles in the English Reformation

== See also ==
- Book of Kings (disambiguation)
- Domesday Book
