= Neptune Resigning to Britannia the Empire of the Sea =

Fresco by William Dyce

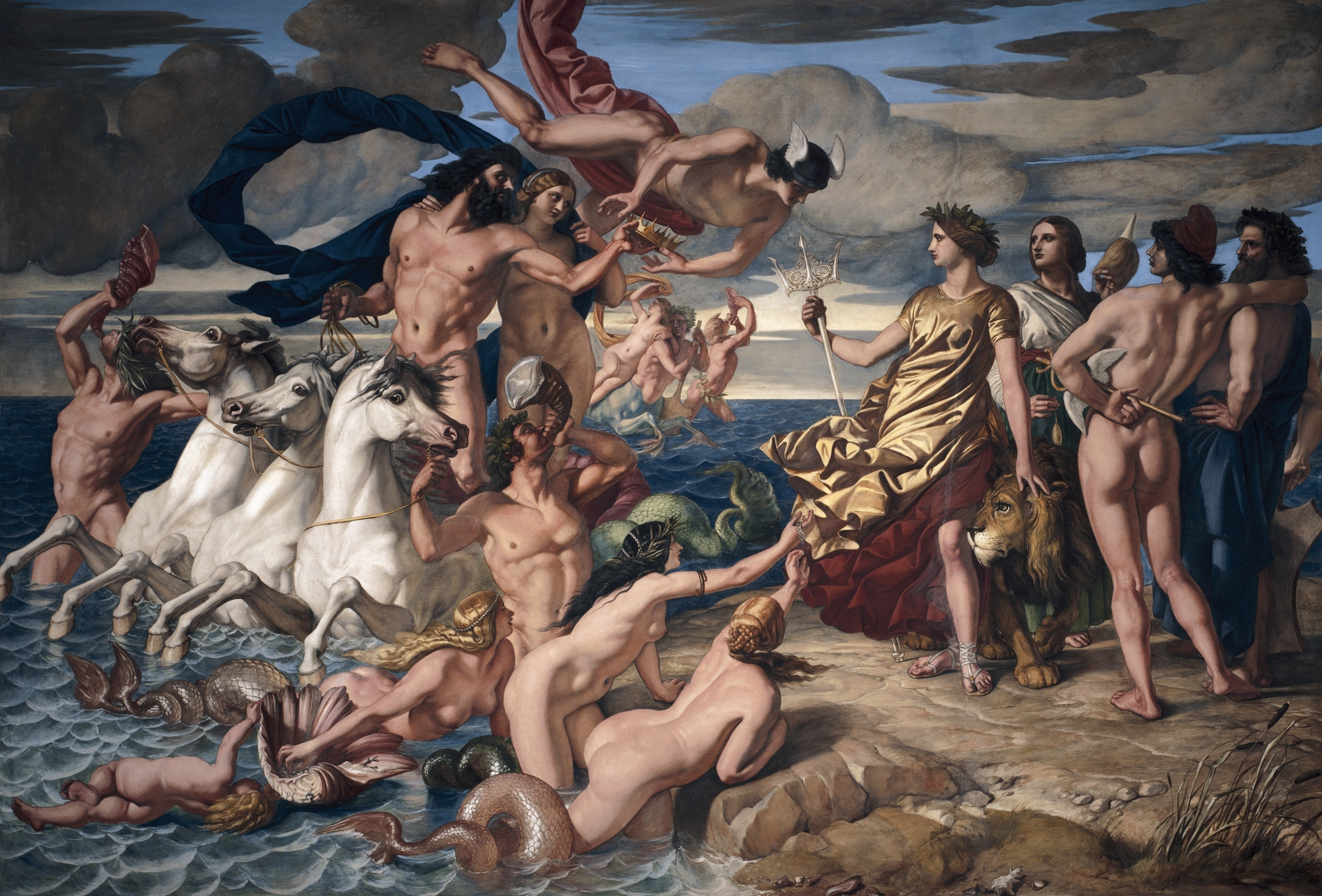
- Artist: William Dyce
- Year: 1847
- Medium: Fresco
- Location: Osborne House, East Cowes

Neptune Resigning to Britannia the Empire of the Sea is an 1847 fresco by Scottish painter William Dyce in the main staircase of Osborne House.

== History and description ==
The painting was commissioned by Queen Victoria and Prince Albert for their newly constructed Isle of Wight residence Osborne House. Prince Albert, a proponent of the revival of fresco art in England, approached William Dyce. Dyce was at the time working on the Westminster Frescoes in the newly rebuilt Palace of Westminster, and had been among those who produced a series of frescoes on John Milton's Comus in the Buckingham Palace garden pavilion.

The final design, depicting Neptune handing a crown to Britannia was accepted by Prince Albert in January 1837 and completed between 3 August and 7 October. It took inspiration from Raphael's Galatea as well as the works of Poussin which had also inspired Dyce's 1826 oil painting Bacchus and the Nymphs of Nysa. The nudity in the painting caused some shock among the Royal household, particularly to Prince Albert himself.

An oil sketch of the work was displayed at the Royal Academy Exhibition of 1847 as Dyce's only exhibit that year and was purchased by Lord Lansdowne. A watercolour and gouache study of the work is also held Aberdeen Art Gallery.
