= Osborne House =

Former royal residence in East Cowes, Isle of Wight, UK

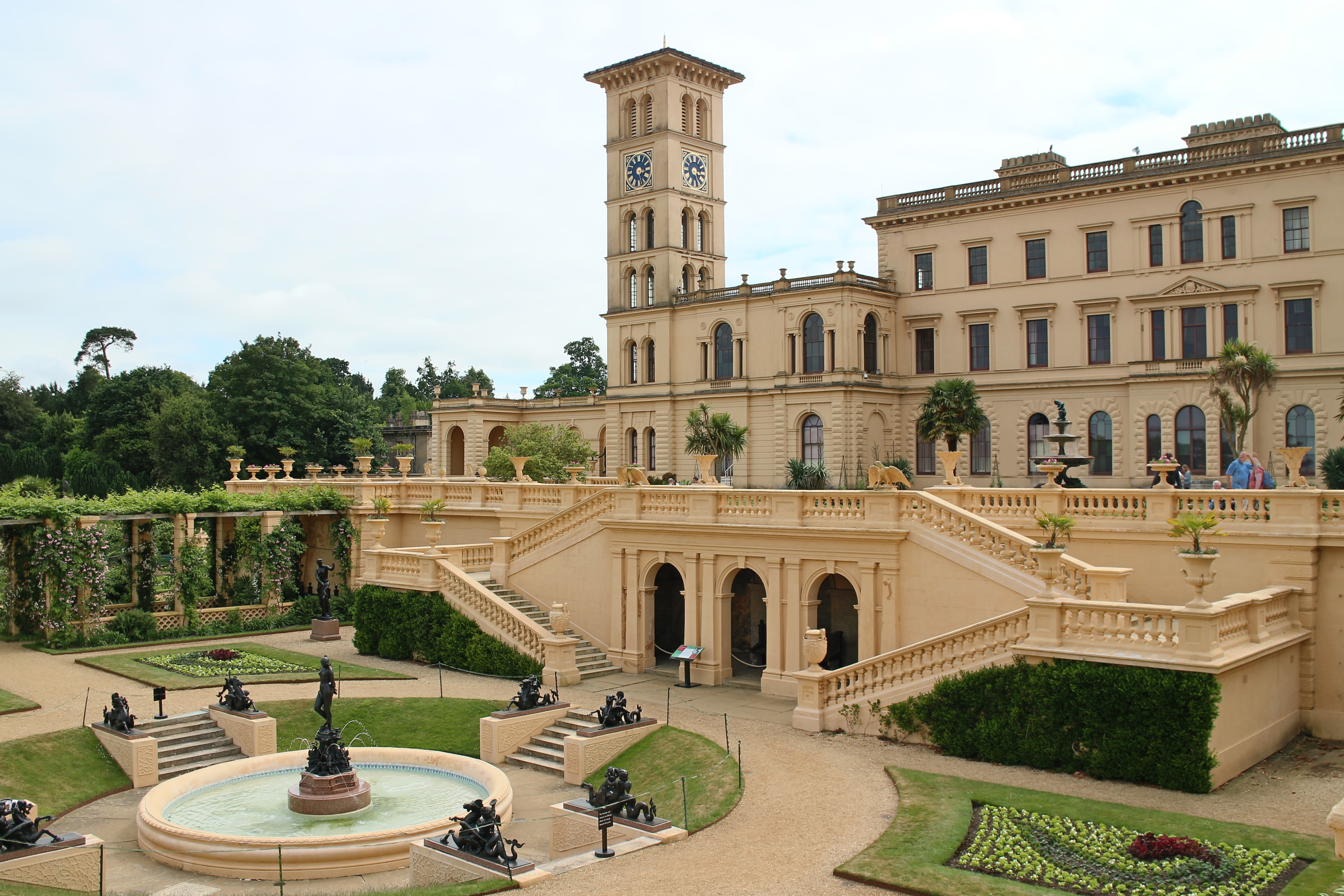
- The terrace and gardens of Osborne House

- Location within Isle of Wight

General information
- Architectural style: Italian Renaissance
- Location: Isle of Wight, East Cowes, United Kingdom
- Coordinates: 50°45′02″N 01°16′11″W
- Construction started: 1845
- Completed: 1851

Design and construction
- Architect: Prince Albert (designer)
- Engineer: Thomas Cubitt (builder)

Listed Building – Grade I
- Official name: Osborne House
- Designated: 9 August 1979
- Reference no.: 1223802

Osborne House is a former royal residence in East Cowes, Isle of Wight, United Kingdom. The house was built between 1845 and 1851 for Queen Victoria and Prince Albert as a summer home and rural retreat. Albert designed the house in the style of an Italian Renaissance palazzo. The builder was Thomas Cubitt, the London architect and builder whose company built the main façade of Buckingham Palace for the royal couple in 1847. An earlier smaller house on the Osborne site was demolished to make way for the new and far larger house, though the original entrance portico survives as the main gateway to the walled garden.

Queen Victoria died at Osborne House on 22 January 1901, aged 81. Following her death, King Edward VII, who had never liked Osborne, presented the house to the state on the day of his coronation, with the royal pavilion being retained as a private museum to Victoria. From 1903 to 1921, part of the estate around the stables was used as a junior officer training college for the Royal Navy, known as the Royal Naval College, Osborne. Another section of the house was used as a convalescent home for officers. In 1933, many of the temporary buildings at Osborne were demolished. In 1954, Queen Elizabeth II gave permission for the first floor rooms (the private apartments) in the royal pavilion to be opened to the public. In 1986, English Heritage assumed management of Osborne House. In 1989, the second floor of the house was also opened to the public.

The house is listed Grade I on the National Heritage List for England, and the landscaped park and gardens are listed Grade II* on the Register of Historic Parks and Gardens.

== History ==
=== Royal retreat ===
Queen Victoria and Prince Albert bought Osborne House on the Isle of Wight from Lady Isabella Blachford in October 1845. They wanted a home removed from the stresses of court life. Victoria had spent two holidays on the Isle of Wight as a young girl, when her mother, the Duchess of Kent, rented Norris Castle, the estate adjacent to Osborne. The setting of the three-storey Georgian house appealed to Victoria and Albert, in particular, the views of the Solent reminding Albert of the Bay of Naples in Italy. They soon realised that the house was too small for their needs and decided to replace the house with a new, larger residence.

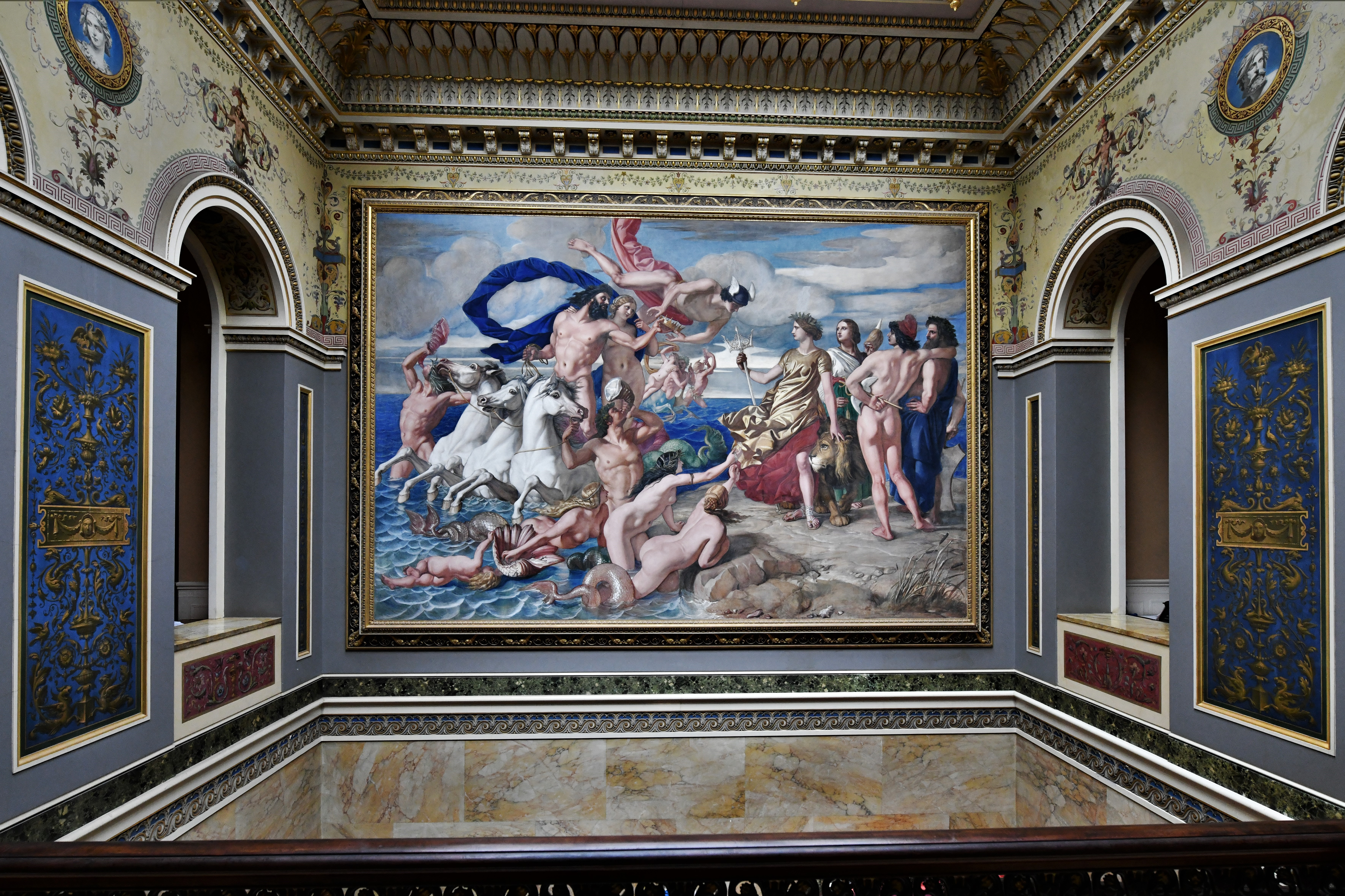
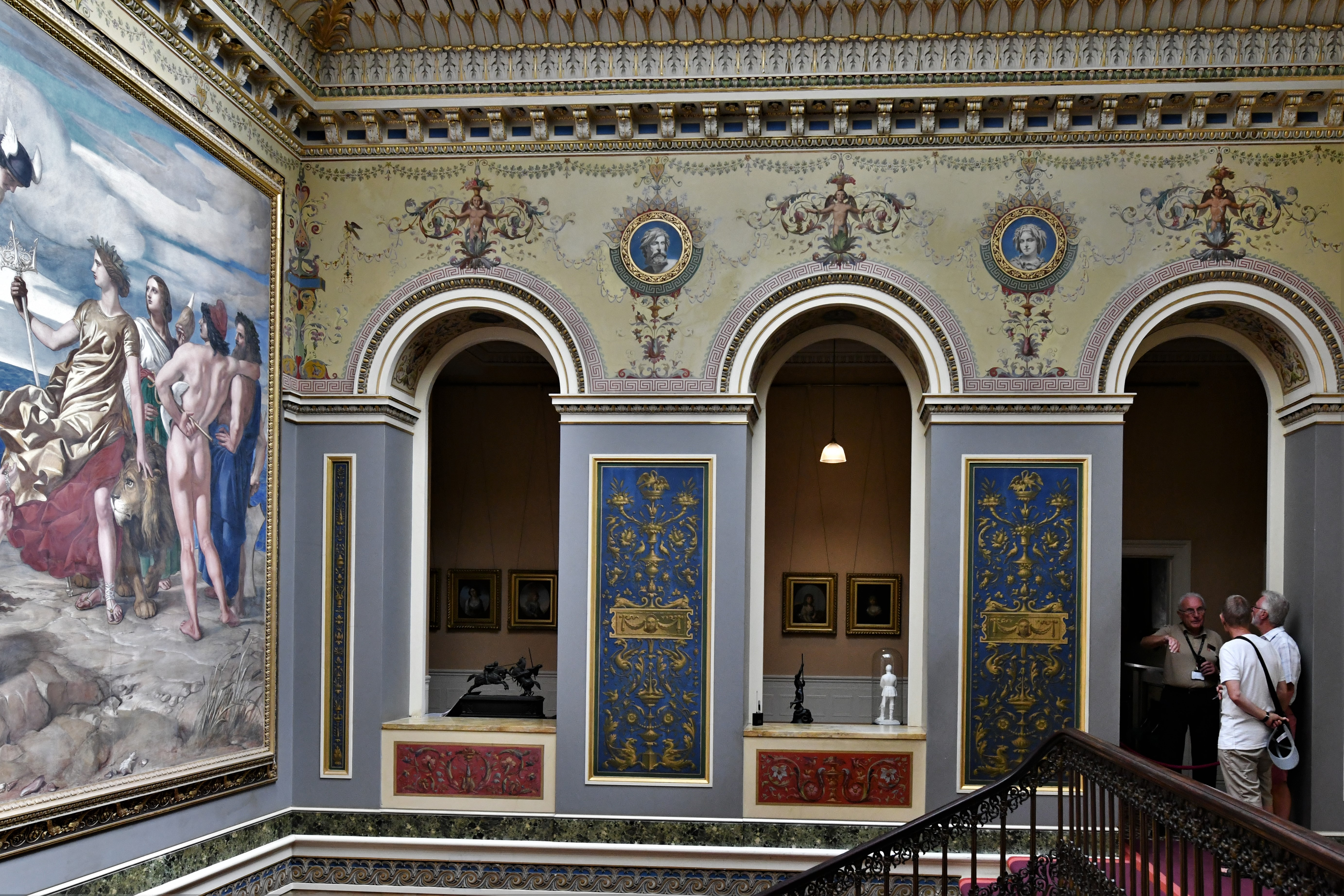
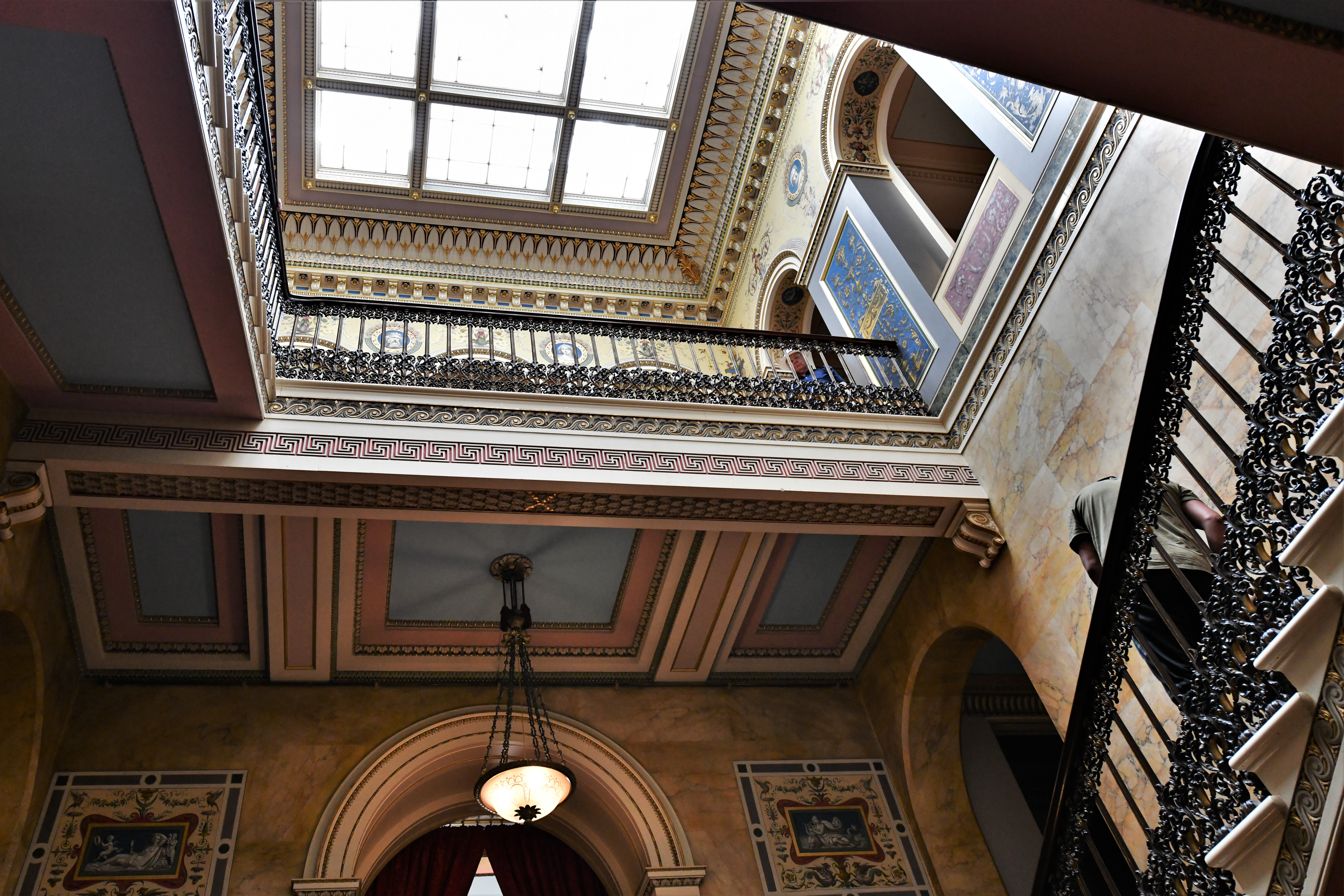
The large fresco on the main staircase at Osborne House is one of several examples reflecting Queen Victoria and Prince Albert's admiration for Italian art and culture. Titled Neptune Resigning to Britannia the Empire of the Sea, it was painted by William Dyce, who travelled to Italy specifically to study fresco techniques for the royal commission.

The new Osborne House was built between 1845 and 1851 in the Italian Renaissance style, complete with two belvedere towers. Prince Albert designed the house himself in conjunction with Thomas Cubitt, the London architect and builder, whose company also built the pre-1913 main façade of Buckingham Palace. The couple paid for much of the furnishing of the new house from the sale of the Royal Pavilion at Brighton. The Prince Consort participated directly in laying out the estate, gardens and woodlands, to prove his knowledge of forestry and landscaping. At the more official royal residences, he had been overruled by the Commissioners of Woods and Forests, who had official responsibilities for the grounds. Below the gardens on Osborne Bay was a private beach, where the queen kept her own private bathing machine. According to a news report:

"The queen's bathing machine was unusually ornate, with a front veranda and curtains which would conceal her until she had entered the water. The interior had a changing room and a plumbed-in WC."

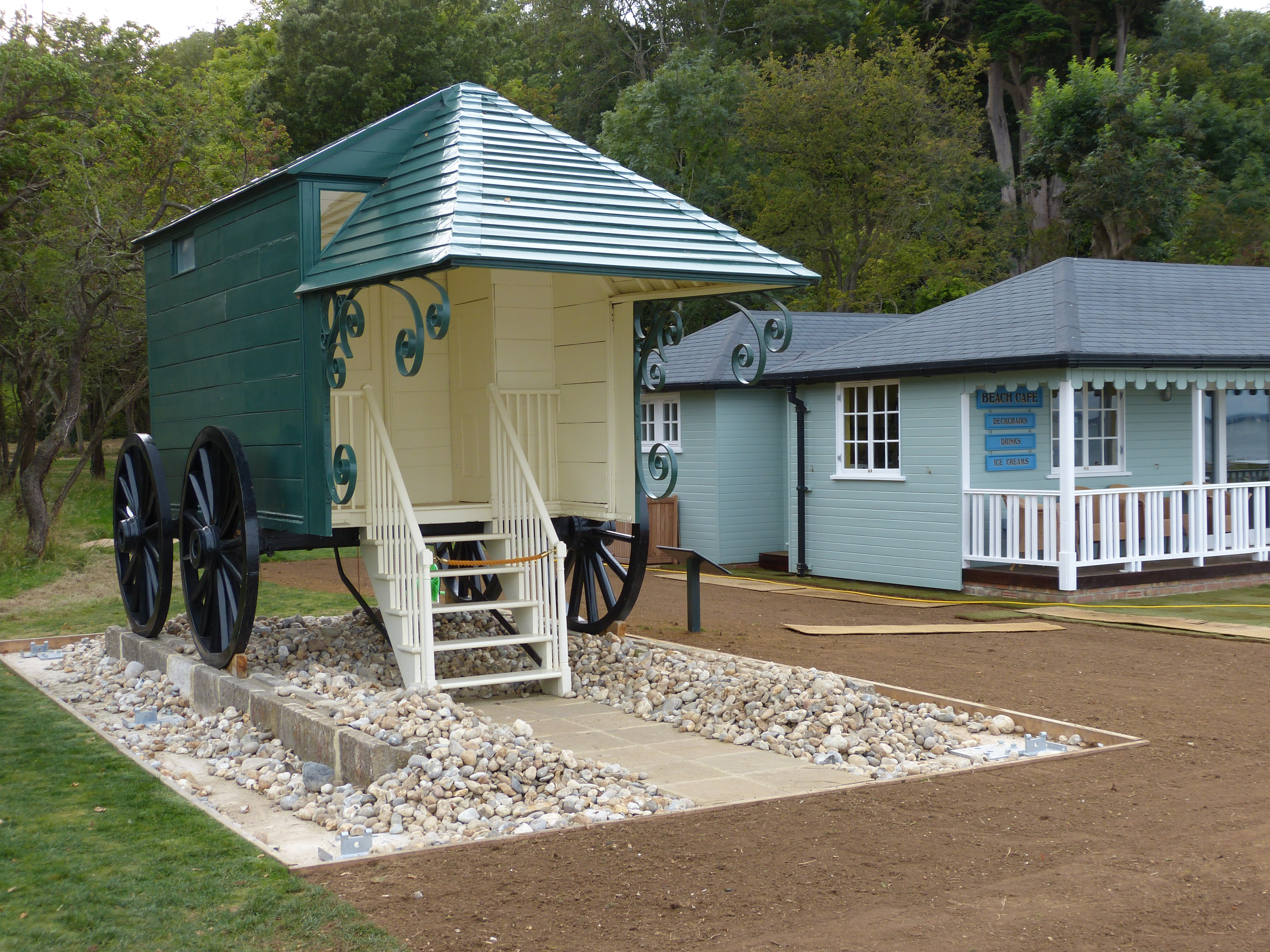
Queen Victoria's bathing machine (restored)

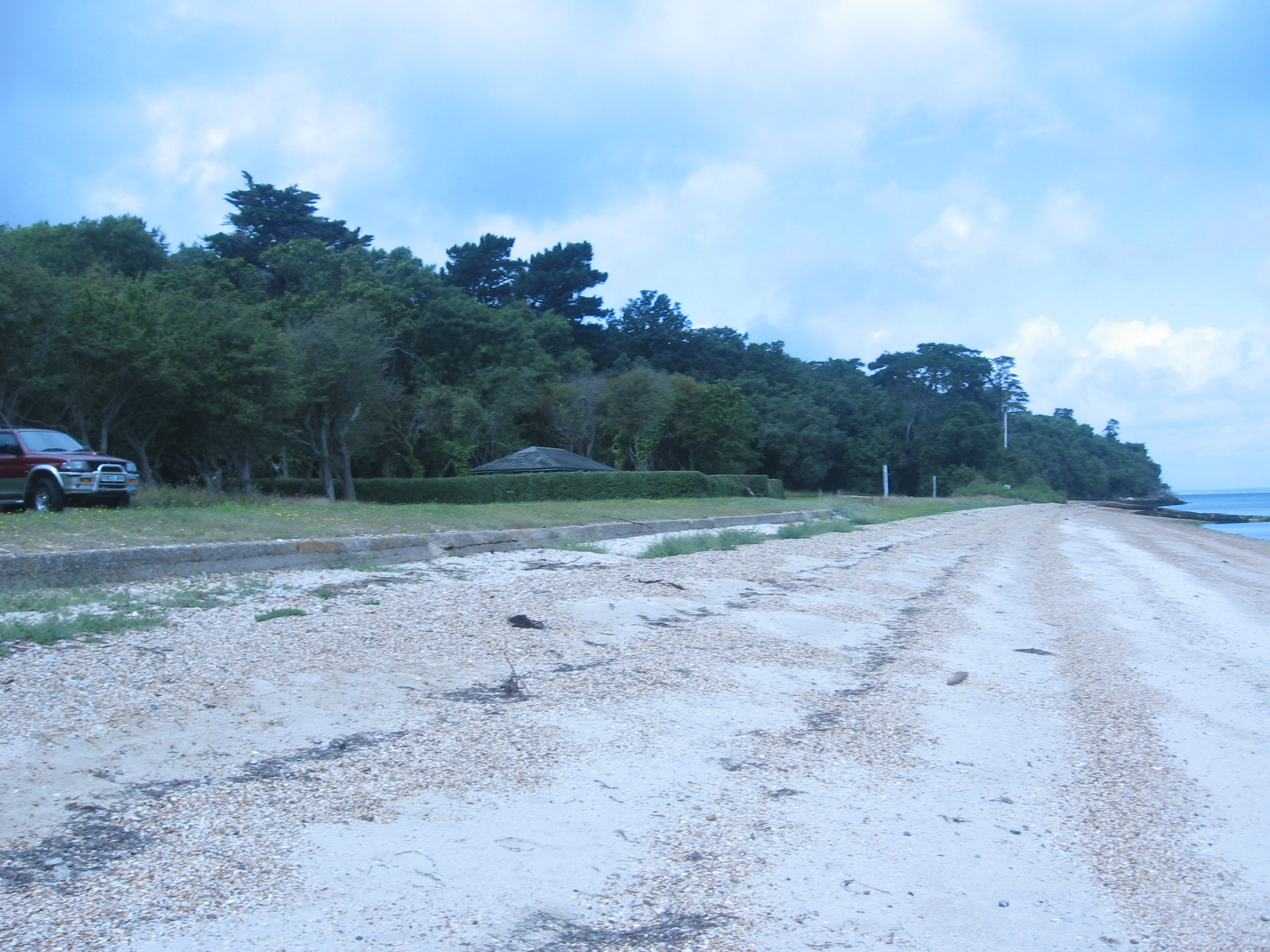
The private beach at Osborne House, where Queen Victoria, Prince Albert and their children swam from bathing machines

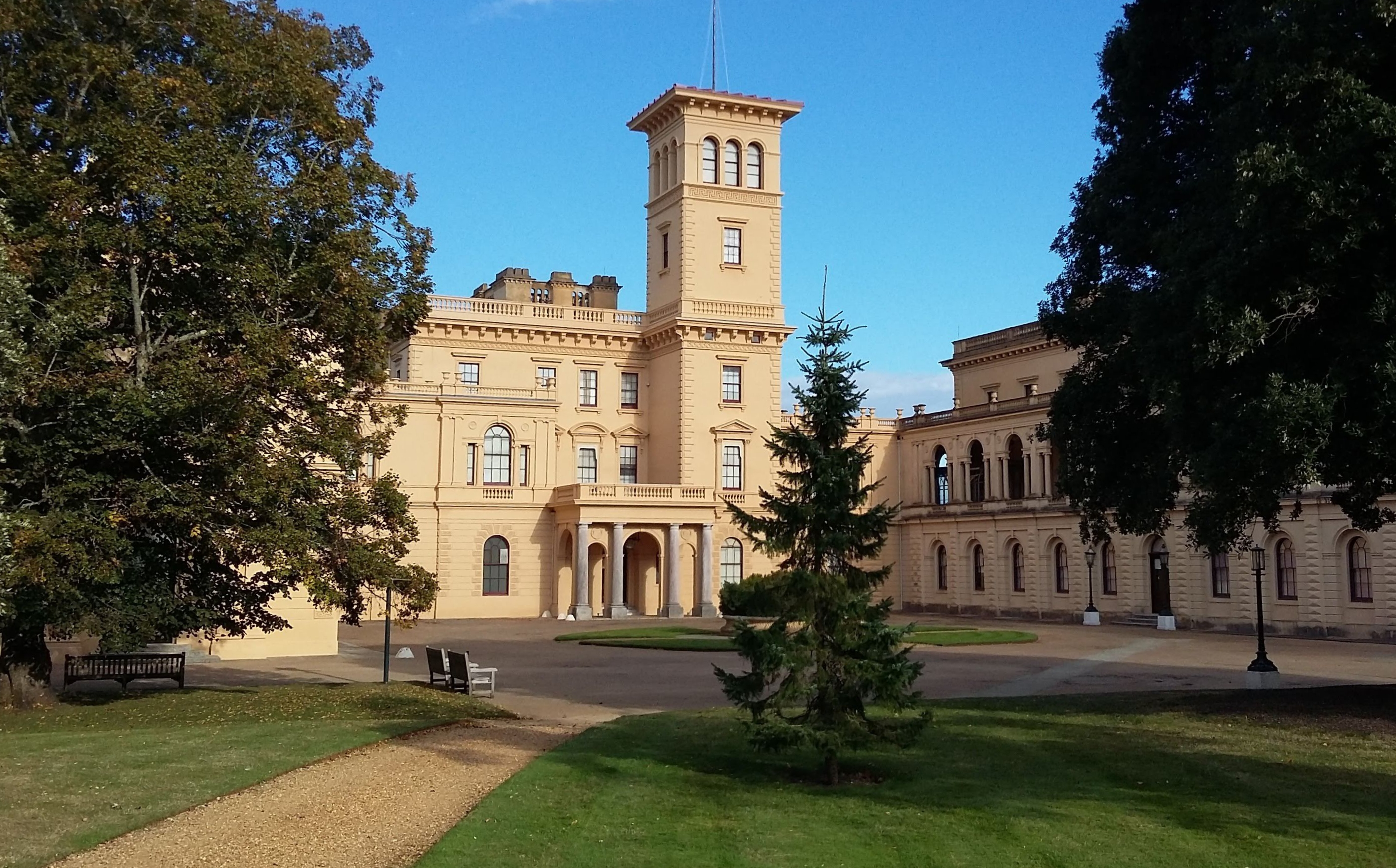
The Pavilion Wing from the south-west

The original square wing of the house was known as "The Pavilion", containing the principal and royal apartments on the ground and first floors, respectively. The principal apartments, particularly, hold reminders of Victoria's dynastic links with the other European royal families. The Billiard Room has held a massive porcelain vase (RCIN 41230) as well as mosaic table (RCIN 1450), that were the diplomatic gift of the Russian Tsar Nicholas I, after his visit to Britain in June 1844 to the queen and Prince Albert. The porcelain vase was originally placed in the window bay of the Green Drawing Room at Windsor Castle, where it stood until soon after Queen Victoria's death. Then it was removed to Osborne, where it was displayed in the billiard room of Osborne House. During the restoration of Windsor Castle following the 1992 fire, the vase and its marble pedestal were returned to Windsor and placed against the north window of the State Dining Room. The mosaic table remains in the billiard room at Osborne House as part of the Royal Collection.

The Billiard Room, Queen's Dining Room, and the Drawing Room on the ground floor all express grandeur.

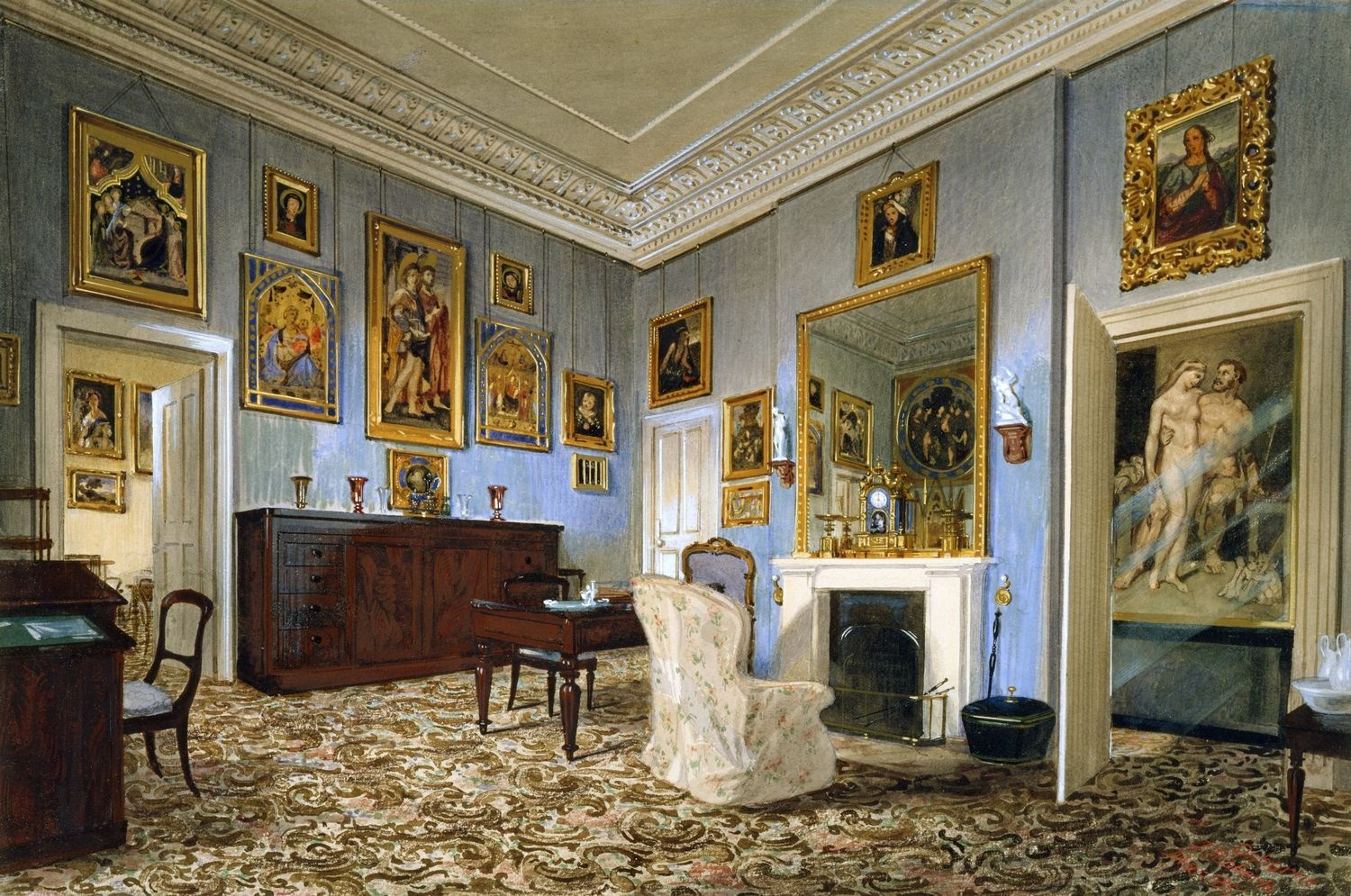
Prince Albert's Dressing Room, 1851, watercolour by James Roberts

In marked contrast is the more homely and unassuming décor of the royal apartments on the first floor. They include the Prince's Dressing Room, the Queen's Sitting Room, the Queen's Bedroom, and the children's nurseries. Intended for private, domestic use, the rooms were made as comfortable as possible. Both Queen Victoria and Prince Albert were determined to bring up their children in a natural and loving environment. They allowed the royal children to visit their parents' bedrooms frequently, at a time when children of aristocrats often lived removed from their parents in nurseries, only joining them occasionally in public rooms, rather than in shared intimate spaces.

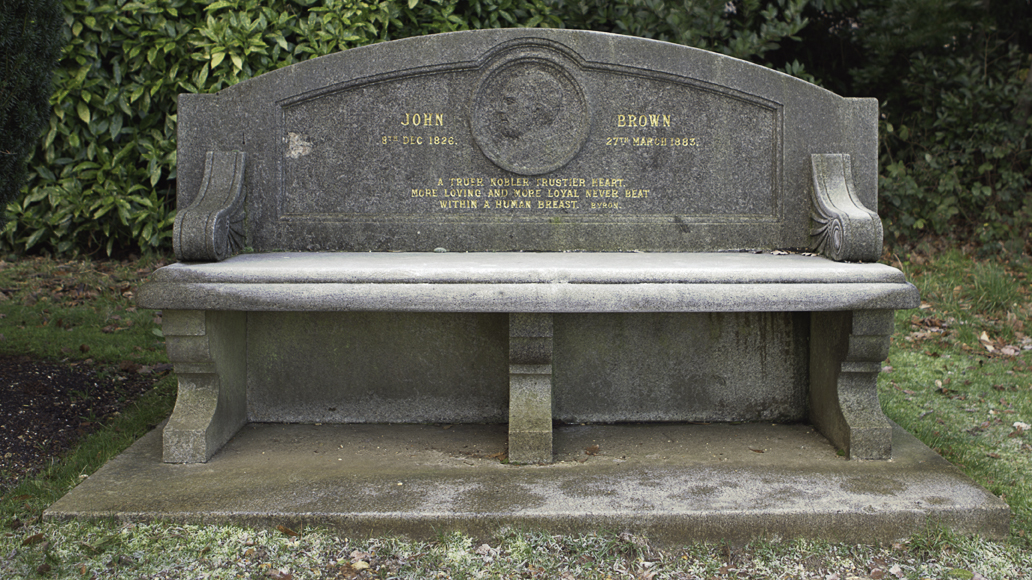
John Brown (1826–1883) Memorial Bench at Osborne House

The main wing was added later. It contains the household accommodation and council and audience chambers, as well as a suite for Victoria's mother. The final addition to the house was a wing, built between 1890 and 1891, designed by John Lockwood Kipling, father of the poet Rudyard Kipling. The ground floor includes the famous Durbar Room, named after an Anglicised version of the Hindi word durbar, meaning court. The Durbar Room was built for state functions. It was decorated by Bhai Ram Singh in an elaborate and intricate style, and has a carpet from Agra. It now holds gifts Queen Victoria received on her Golden and Diamond jubilees. They include engraved silver and copper vases, Indian armour, and a model of an Indian palace. The first floor of the new wing was for the sole use of Princess Beatrice and her family. Beatrice was the queen's youngest daughter, and she lived near Victoria during her life.

Osborne House expresses numerous associations with the British Raj and India, housing a collection of paintings of Indian persons and scenes, painted at Queen Victoria's request by Rudolf Swoboda. These include depictions of Indians resident or visiting Britain in the 19th century, and scenes painted in India when Swoboda travelled there to create such works.

The royal family stayed at Osborne for lengthy periods each year: in the spring for Victoria's birthday in May; in July and August when they celebrated Albert's birthday; and just before Christmas. In a break from the past, Queen Victoria and Prince Albert allowed photographers and painters to make works featuring their family in the grounds and in the house. That was partly for their own enjoyment and partly as a form of public relations, to demonstrate to the nation their character as a happy and devoted family. Many thousands of prints of the royal family were sold to the public, which led Victoria to remark, "no Sovereign was ever more loved than I am (I am bold enough to say)." Writing to her daughter Princess Victoria in 1858 about the gloominess of Windsor Castle, Queen Victoria stated, "I long for our cheerful and unpalacelike rooms at Osborne."

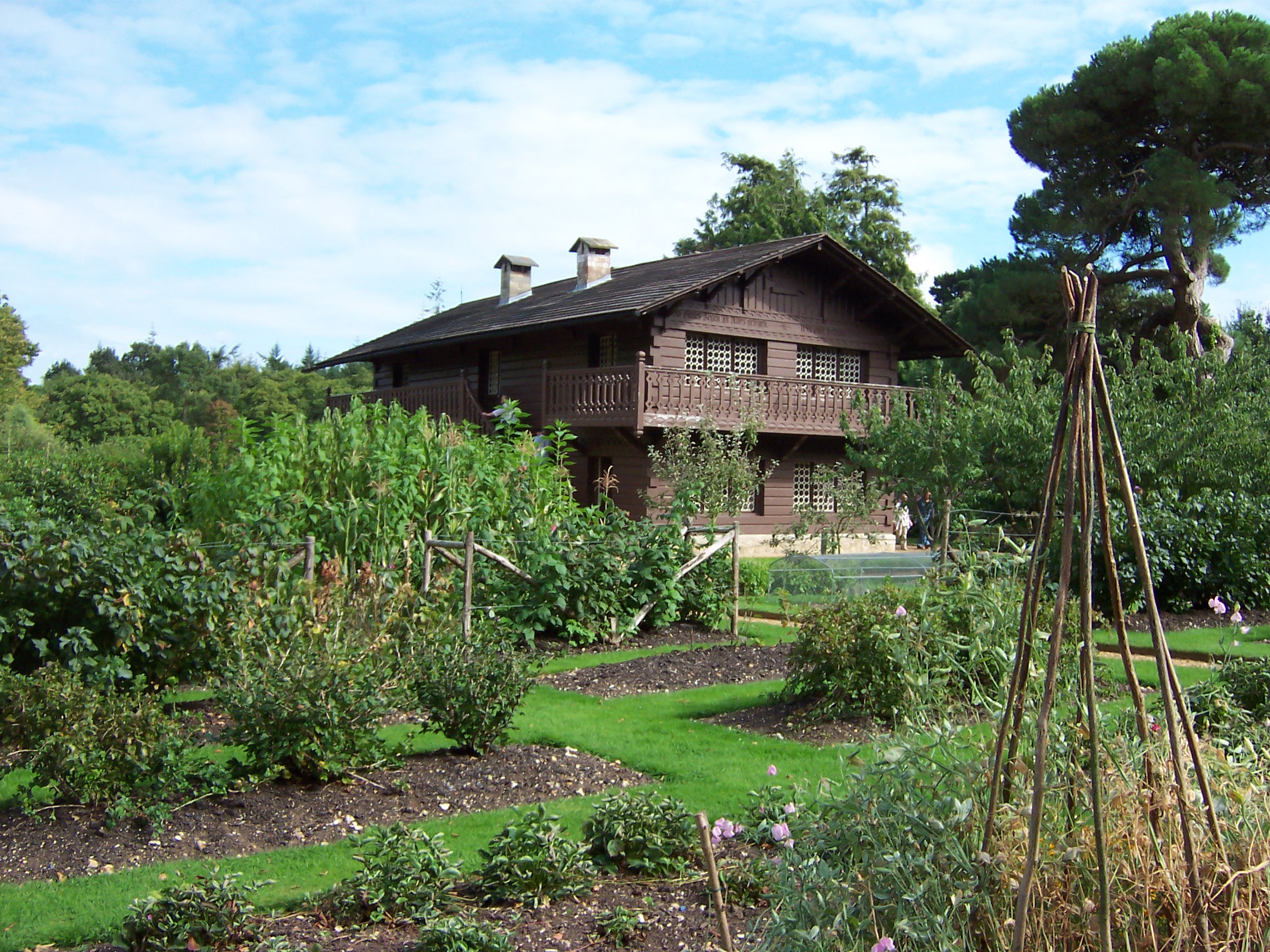
The Swiss Cottage

The grounds also included a "Swiss Cottage" for the royal children. The cottage was dismantled and brought piece by piece from Switzerland to Osborne where it was reassembled. There, the royal children were encouraged to garden. Each child was given a rectangular plot in which to grow fruit, vegetables and flowers. They sold their produce to their father. Prince Albert used this as a way to teach the basics of economics. The children also learned to cook in the Swiss Cottage, which was equipped with a fully functioning kitchen. Both parents saw this kind of education as a way of grounding their children in the activities of daily life shared by the people in the kingdom despite their royal status.

In 1859, Prince Albert designed a new and larger quadrangular stable block, which was built by Cubitts on the former cricket pitch. The building is listed Grade II* on the National Heritage List for England. After Prince Albert died at Windsor Castle in December 1861, Queen Victoria continued to visit Osborne House because it was one of her favourite homes. In 1876, as a tribute to Queen Victoria, the Government House in the colony (now State) of Victoria, Australia, was constructed as a copy of Osborne House.

On 14 January 1878, Alexander Graham Bell demonstrated an early version of the telephone to the queen at Osborne House, placing calls to Cowes, Southampton and London. They were the first publicly witnessed long-distance telephone calls in Britain. The queen tried the device and considered the process to be "quite extraordinary" although the sound was "rather faint". She later asked to buy the equipment that was used, but Bell offered to make "a set of telephones" specifically for her.

=== National gift ===
Osborne Estate Act 1902 (Note: Section 3.)
- Act of Parliament
- Parliament of the United Kingdom
- Long title: An Act to make provision with respect to the disposition and management of His Majesty's Osborne Estate in the Isle of Wight.
- Citation: 2 Edw. 7. c. 37
- Territorial extent: United Kingdom

Dates
- Royal assent: 18 December 1902
- Commencement: 18 December 1902 (Note: The Acts of Parliament (Commencement) Act 1793.)
Other legislation
Amended by	Civil List Act 1910; Crown Estate Act 1961; Enterprise and Regulatory Reform Act 2013

Status: Amended

Text of statute as originally enacted

Queen Victoria died at Osborne on 22 January 1901, with two generations of her family present. Although she adored Osborne, and her will left strict instructions Osborne was to remain in the family, her children did not share the attachment. Princess Beatrice and Princess Louise were granted houses on the estate. Edward VII presented Osborne to the nation on his Coronation Day in August 1902; this required an act of Parliament, the Osborne Estate Act 1902, to effect, the estate having been entailed to Edward's heirs after his death and the death of his eldest son, George, Prince of Wales. The royal apartments on the upper floors of the pavilion wing, including the late queen's bedroom, were turned into a private museum accessible only to the royal family.

=== Later uses ===
==== Royal Naval College, 1903–1921 ====
In 1903, the new stable block became a junior officer training college for the Royal Navy known as the Royal Naval College, Osborne. Initial training began at about the age of 13, and after two years studies were continued at the Royal Naval College, Dartmouth. The college closed in 1921, with the last students leaving on 9 April 1921. Former students of Osborne included Queen Victoria's great-grandsons, the future Edward VIII and George VI, and their younger brother George, Duke of Kent. Another well-known alumnus of the college was Jack Llewelyn Davies, one of the five Llewelyn Davies boys who inspired J. M. Barrie's Peter Pan. The case of George Archer-Shee from 1908, who was expelled from Osborne after being falsely accused of stealing a 5-shilling postal order, inspired the play The Winslow Boy.

==== Military convalescent home ====
During World War I, the secondary wings of Osborne House were used as an officers' convalescent home. Robert Graves and A. A. Milne were two famous patients. Known as the King Edward VII Retirement Home for Officers, it later accommodated convalescents from military and civil service backgrounds, including retired officers of the British armed services until 2000. Georgina Haines RRC was selected by King Edward VII to become matron of the convalscent home in 1903, and ran it until 1917. Sir Frederick Treves was chairman.

== Thomas Cubitt ==
Thomas Cubitt was one of the most renowned architects of the 19th century, known as "the Emperor of the building trade".

Prince Albert, impressed with Cubitt's previous works, commissioned him to rebuild Osborne House. Cubitt and Prince Albert worked hand in hand in constructing and designing the house, creating the mix of Palladian architecture and Italian renaissance style. Cubitt not only designed the structure but also implemented many of his own features into the house from his own workshops. As well as the doors and fireplaces of his own design, he also incorporated his own patterns for the plaster within the house.

The design of Osborne House is stately and intended for royalty, but it is not so grand that it is unwelcoming. Queen Victoria and Prince Albert wanted an escape from the stuffiness of Buckingham Palace; they wanted a home for their children to feel free and welcome. Once Osborne House was complete, they commissioned Cubitt to build the east wing of Buckingham Palace. Victoria admired Cubitt not only for his work on Osborne House but also for his character. She referred to him as "our Cubitt" and on his death said that "a better, kinder-hearted man never breathed".

== Preservation ==
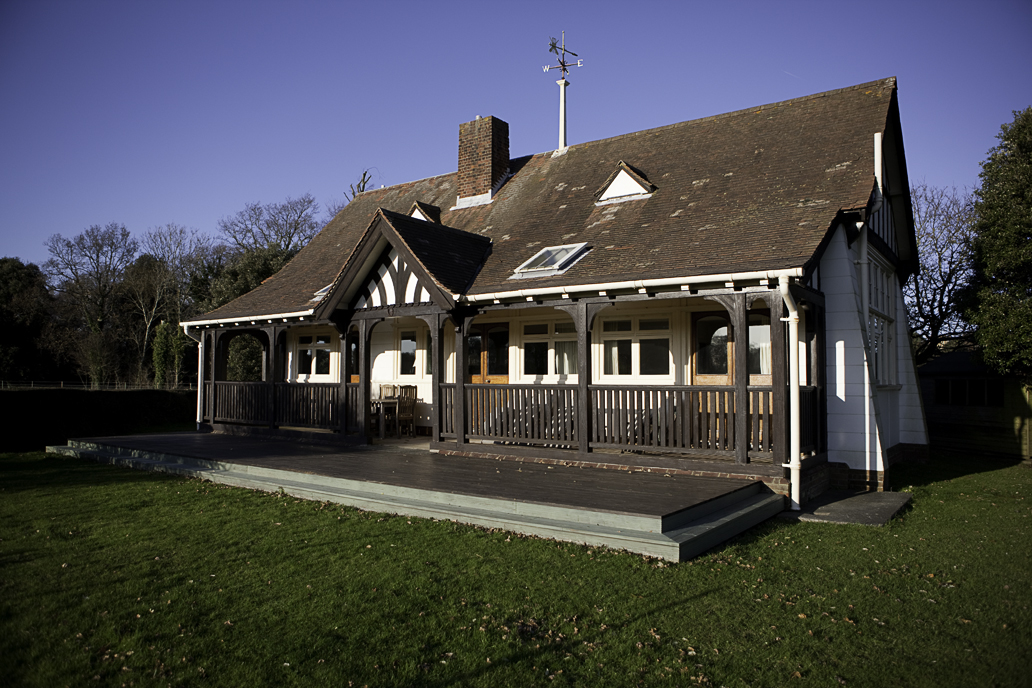
Cricket pavilion – Osborne House

Since 1986, Osborne House has been under the care of English Heritage. It is open to the public. The house is listed Grade I on the National Heritage List for England, and the landscaped park and gardens are listed Grade II* on the Register of Historic Parks and Gardens.

The former Naval College's cricket pavilion was converted into a holiday cottage in 2004. Since 2005, the house has occasionally hosted picnic-style concerts on the lawn outside the main house.

Queen Victoria's private beach at Osborne was opened to the public for the first time in July 2012.

== Gallery ==
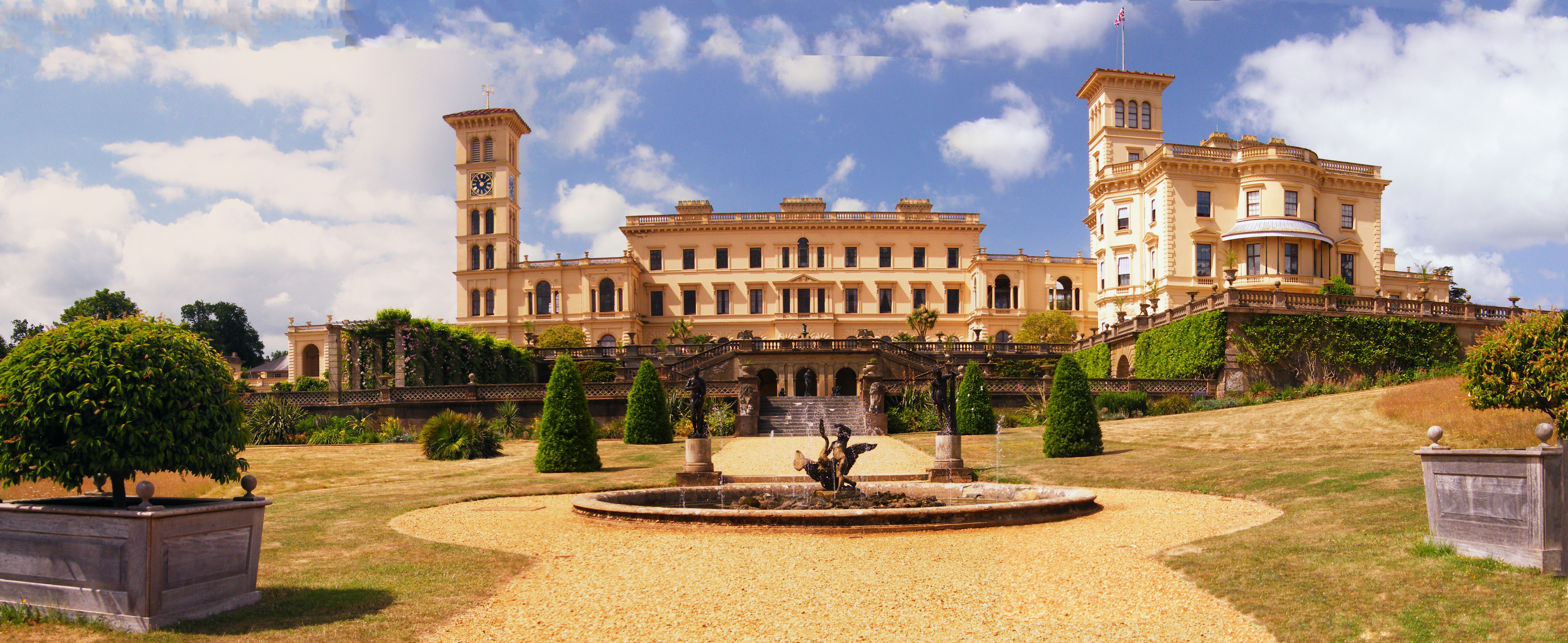
The main façade of Osborne House is designed in the Italianate style.

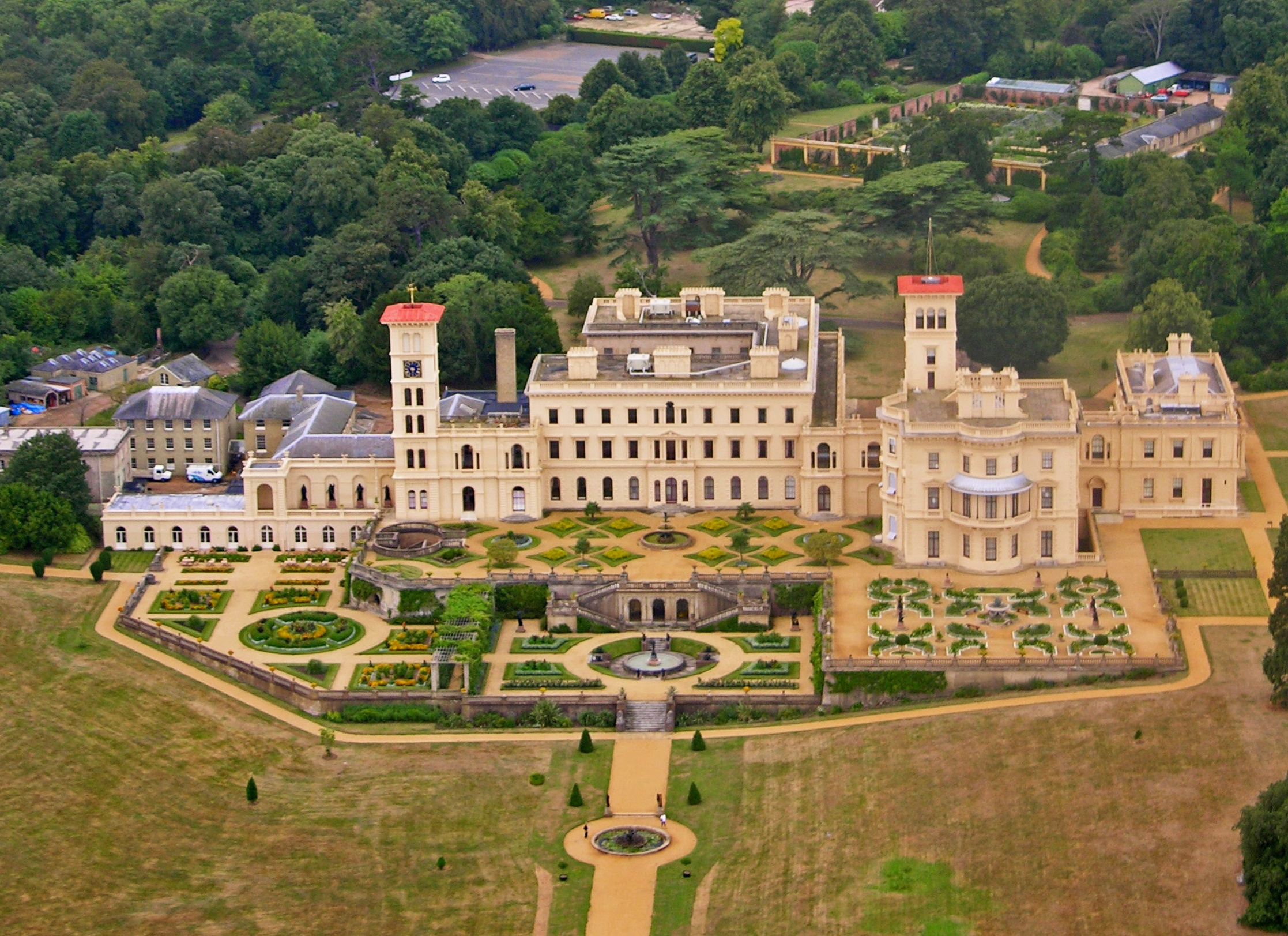
Aerial view of Osborne House

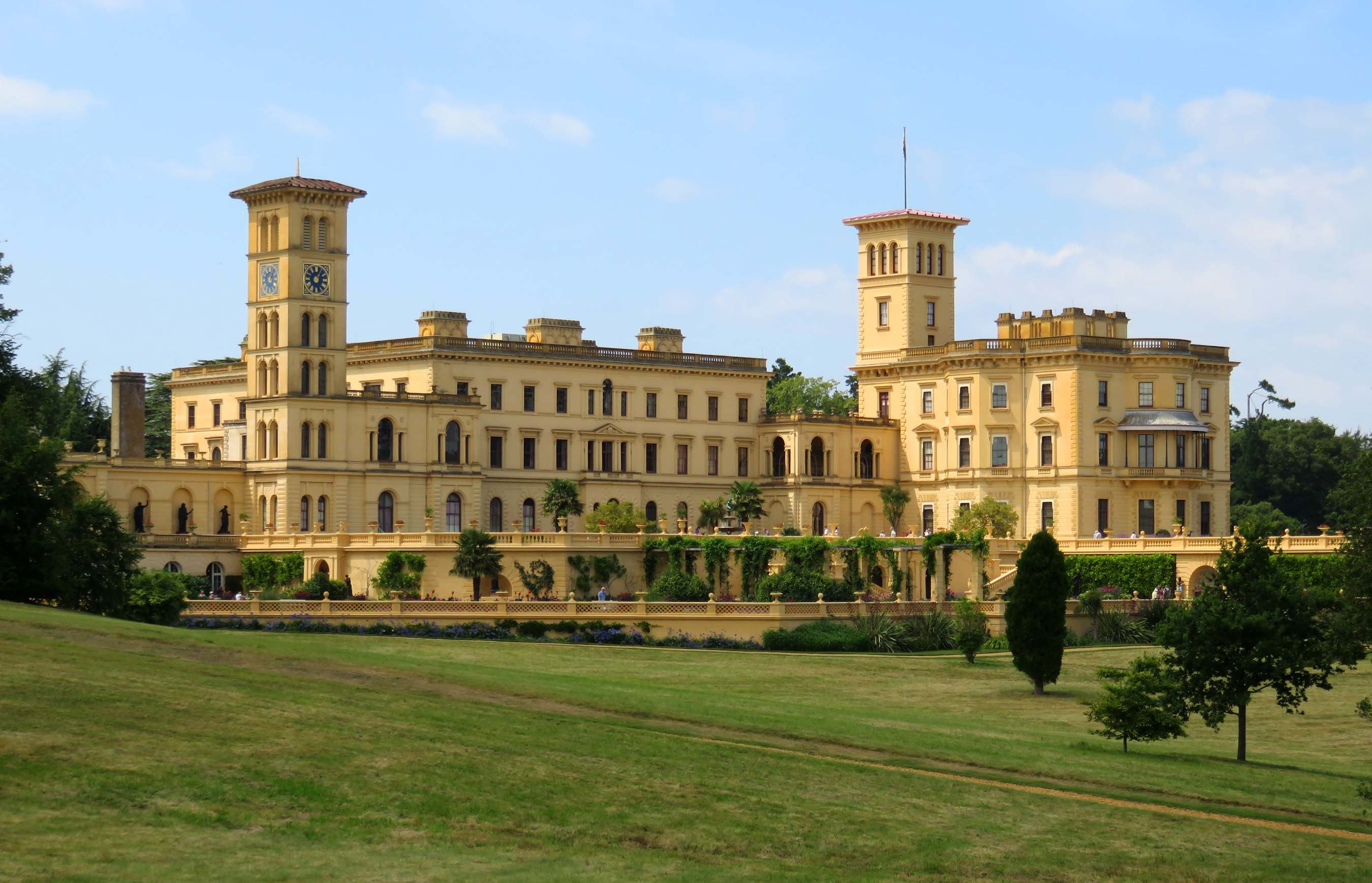
North east façade

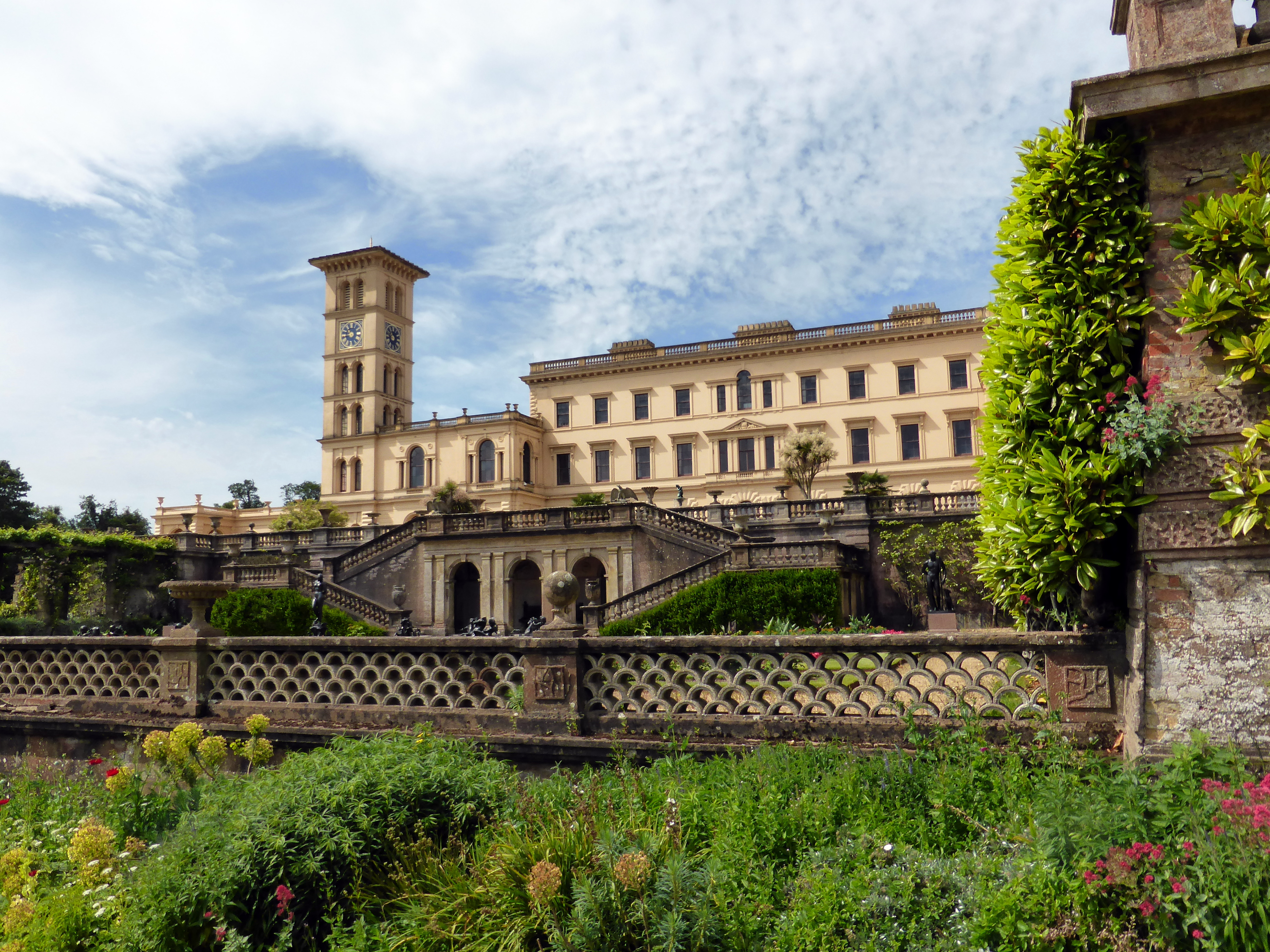
The main façade and terrace gardens of Osborne House

== Sources ==
- Adair, John Eric (1981). The Royal Palaces of Britain. C.N. Potter. ISBN 978-0-517-54554-6.
- Struthers, Jane; Coe, Chris; Riddle, Paul (2004). Royal Palaces of Britain. New Holland. ISBN 978-1-84330-733-4.
- Turner, Michael (2007). Osborne. London: English Heritage. ISBN 978-1-84802-295-9.
