= Henry VI at Towton =

Painting by William Dyce

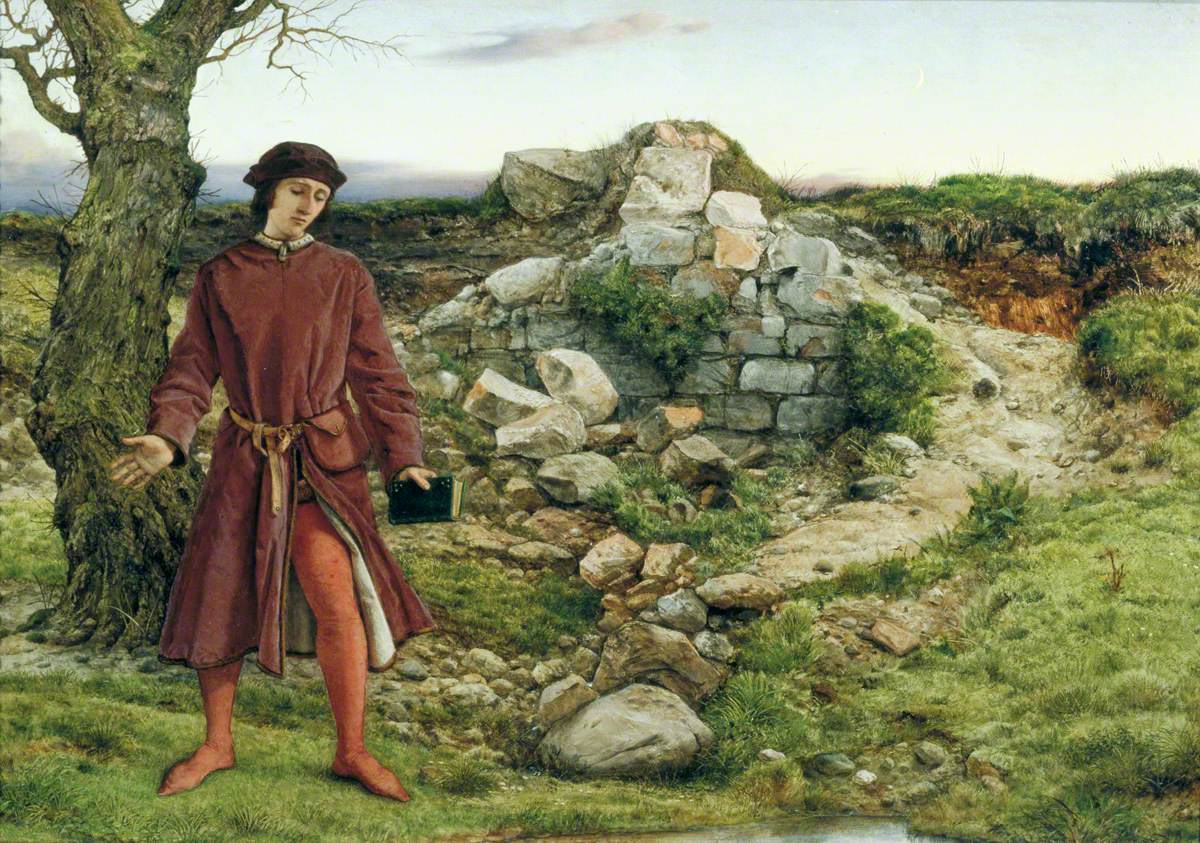
- Artist: William Dyce
- Year: 1860
- Type: Oil on panel, history painting
- Dimensions: 37 cm × 51 cm (15 in × 20 in)
- Location: Guildhall Art Gallery, London

Henry VI at Towton is an 1860 history painting by the British artist William Dyce. It depicts a scene from the War of the Roses. At the Battle of Towton in 1462, the dejected Henry VI wanders alone, ruminating on the horrors of civil war. The work is based on a passage from William Shakespeare's Elizabethan era play Henry VI, Part 3. The composition borrows from earlier images Dyce had produced depicting Jesus Christ in the Wilderness, giving the painting a touch of religious intensity.

In the latter part of his career the artist was associated with the Pre-Raphaelite Brotherhood. The work was never exhibited in Dyce's lifetime. The painting is in the collection of the Guildhall Art Gallery in London, having been given by Charles Gassiot in 1902.

== Bibliography ==
- Pointon, Marcia R. William Dyce, 1806-1864: A Critical Biography. Oxford University Press, 1979.
- Roe, Sonia & Oil Paintings in Public Ownership in the City of London of London. Public Catalogue Foundation, 2009.
- Sillars, Stuart. Shakespeare and the Victorians. Oxford University Press, 2013.
