= Book of Kings =

Book of Kings may refer to:

- Books of Kings in the Bible
- Shahnameh, an 11th-century epic Persian poem
- Pararaton, the Javanese Book of Kings, a 16th-century Javanese history of southeast Asia
- The Book of Kings, a 1999 World War II novel by James Thackara
- The Book of Kings, a 2011 funeral doom metal album by Mournful Congregation
- The final chapter of the Right Ginza, a Mandaean religious text

== See also ==
- King's Book (disambiguation)
- Book of shu-king
