= William Dyce =

Scottish painter (1806–1864)

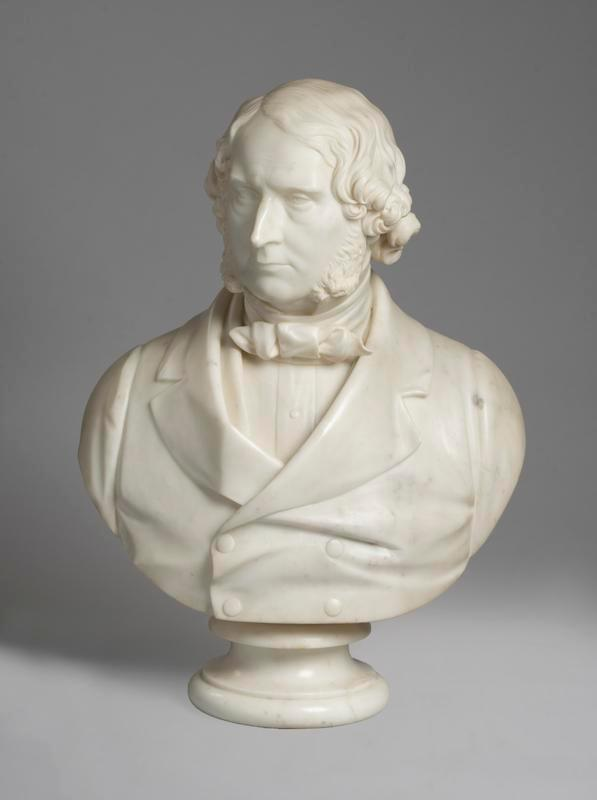
William Dyce RA, by Edgar George Papworth Senior, 1864

William Dyce FRSE RSA RA (/daɪs/; 19 September 1806 in Aberdeen – 14 February 1864) was a Scottish painter, who played a part in the formation of public art education in the United Kingdom, and the South Kensington Schools system. Dyce was associated with the Pre-Raphaelite Brotherhood and played a part in their early popularity.

== Life ==
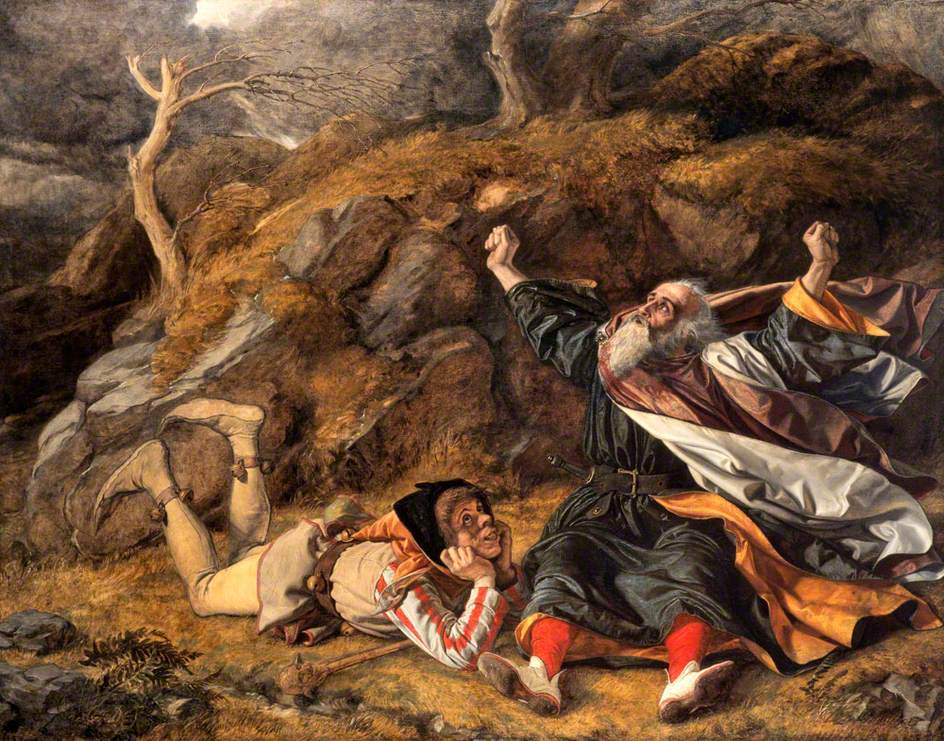
King Lear and the Fool in the Storm, 1851

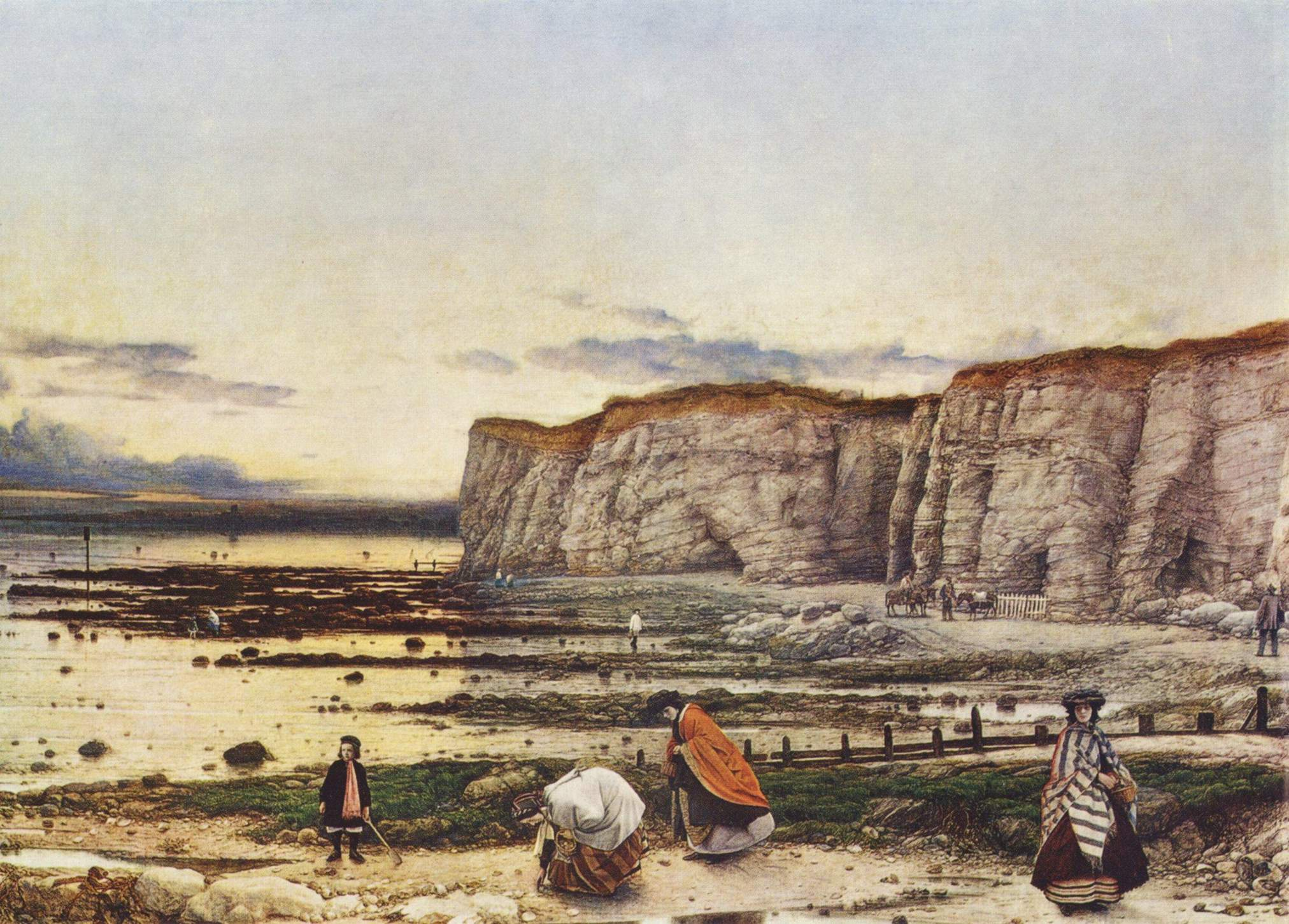
Pegwell Bay, Kent – a Recollection of October 5th 1858

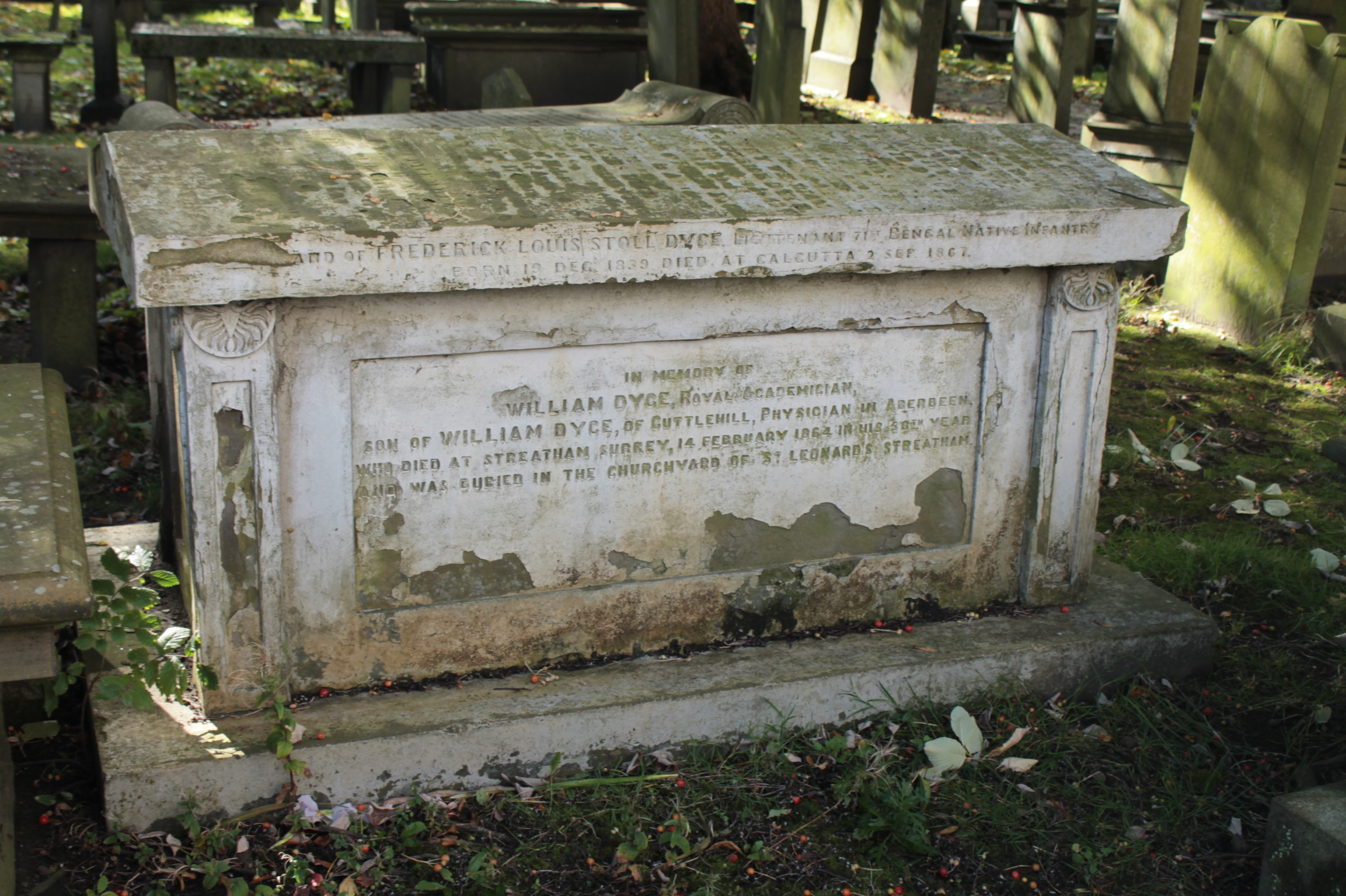
Dyce grave, churchyard of the Kirk of St Nicholas, Aberdeen

Dyce was born on 19 September 1806 at 48 Marischal Street in Aberdeen, the son of William Dyce of Fonthill and Cuttlehill FRSE and Margaret Chalmers of Westburn. His uncle was General Alexander Dyce FRSE. His older brother was Robert Dyce FRSE.

After studying at Marischal College, Dyce showed an early aptitude for design and began his artistic career at the Royal Academy schools in Edinburgh and London. He travelled to Rome for the first time in 1825, and while there he studied the works of Titian and Poussin. He returned to Aberdeen after nine months, and painted several pictures, including Bacchus nursed by the Nymphs of Nysa, which was exhibited in 1827. He returned to Rome in 1827, this time staying for a year and a half, and during this period he appears to have made the acquaintance of the German Nazarene painter Friedrich Overbeck, who admired Dyce's Virgin and Child. After these travels, Dyce settled for several years in Edinburgh. He supported himself by painting portraits at first, but soon took to other subjects of art, especially the religious subjects he preferred.

In 1837 Dyce was given charge of the School of Design in Edinburgh, and was then invited to London, where he was based thereafter, to head the newly established Government School of Design, later to become the Royal College of Art. Before taking up this post in 1838 he and a colleague were sent to visit France and Germany to enquire into design education there and prepare a report. He left the school in 1843, to be able to paint more, but remained a member of the Council of the school. The ideas that were developed in the following decade into the "South Kensington system" that dominated English art education for the rest of the century really have their origin in Dyce's work.

In 1844, having been appointed professor of fine art in King's College London, he delivered a significant lecture, The Theory of the Fine Arts. In 1835 he had been elected an associate of the Royal Scottish Academy, an honour he relinquished upon settling in London, and he was then made an honorary member. In 1844 he became an associate, and in 1848 a full member, of the London Royal Academy of Arts; he also was elected a member of the Pennsylvania Academy of the Fine Arts in Philadelphia. Around this time, Dyce moved to Cheyne Walk in the artistic quarter of Chelsea, London.

In 1849 when the new 'godless' florin coins were introduced by the Royal Mint, Dyce was responsible for the reverse design showing crowned cruciform shields bisected with emblems of the rose, thistle and shamrock in the angles. He also took on the similar design used on the reverse of the later Queen Victoria 'gothic head' florins which were issued from 1851 to 1887.

Dyce is less known for, but nevertheless important as, the founder of the Motett Society (1840–1852), which sought to advance the restoration and liturgical use of long-neglected works of the English church. He was noted as an able organist, and is also reputed to have composed some musical works (unverified).

Dyce died in Streatham in Surrey on 14 February 1864. There is a street in Streatham named for him – William Dyce Mews. A stained glass window in St Machar's Cathedral in Aberdeen is jointly dedicated to Dyce.

== Collections ==
Dyce's most highly thought of painting today is his exceptionally detailed seaside landscape of Pegwell Bay in Kent, now in the Tate Gallery. A rather atypical work, it is fully titled Pegwell Bay, Kent – a Recollection of October 5th 1858, and was exhibited at the Royal Academy summer exhibition in 1860. The largest collection of Dyce's work is held at Aberdeen Art Gallery, Scotland.

A lengthy assessment of his art and influence was written by William Michael Rossetti in the Encyclopædia Britannica Eleventh Edition.

== Pre-Raphaelites ==
Dyce is the figure in Scottish art most associated with the Pre-Raphaelites. He befriended the young Pre-Raphaelites in London and introduced their work to the influential art critic John Ruskin. His later work was Pre-Raphaelite in its spirituality, as can be seen in his The Man of Sorrows and David in the Wilderness (both 1860), which contain a Pre-Raphaelite attention to detail.

== Westminster frescoes ==
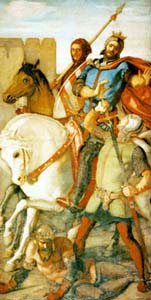
The Return of King Arthur

Knights of the Round Table Departing on the Quest for the Holy Grail

Later in his career, Dyce turned to fresco-painting, and was selected to execute a series of murals at the newly completed the Palace of Westminster. (Note: The complex history surrounding the decoration is best summarized by Boase 1954) In preparation for work at Westminster, he returned to Italy in 1845–47, to observe the fresco techniques employed there. He was particularly impressed by Pinturicchio's frescoes in the Piccolomini Library in Siena, and by the works of Perugino.

After completing The Baptism of Ethelbert (1846) in the House of Lords Chamber, Dyce was commissioned to decorate the Queen's Robing Room in the Palace. He chose as his subject the Arthurian legends, He had some difficulty adapting the Courtly love of Malory's tales to Victorian mores. The Arthurian legend became popular later in the Victorian period, but when Dyce received the commission to decorate the room in 1847, it was still an obscure subject. The legend soon became a major problem for Dyce, as it turns on the unfaithfulness of a queen, which causes the fall of a kingdom.

After initially experimenting with a narrative sequence in which the tale would unfold in the room's panels, Dyce abandoned this in favour of an allegorical approach. In their finished form, Dyce's frescoes depict scenes from the Arthurian legend that are intended to exemplify the virtues inscribed beneath them. The actions of the figures in his frescoes appear to the modern viewer to convey qualities whose status as virtues is uncertain, and the connection between the episodes from the Arthurian legend and the virtues they represent is sometimes difficult to discern. The virtues depicted are Mercy, Hospitality, Generosity, Religion, and Courtesy. Two projected frescoes, Courage and Fidelity, were never executed.

Dyce was working on the frescoes in Westminster when he collapsed, and later died at his home in Streatham on 14 February 1864. He was buried at St Leonard's Church, Streatham. A nearby drinking fountain, designed in the neo-Gothic style by Dyce, was subsequently dedicated to him by the parishioners.

== Family ==
In 1850 Dyce married Jane Bickerton Brand (died 1885).

Dyce's nephew (his sister's son) was the engineer William Dyce Cay, and his niece was the social activist Meredith Jemima Brown.

== Gallery of works ==
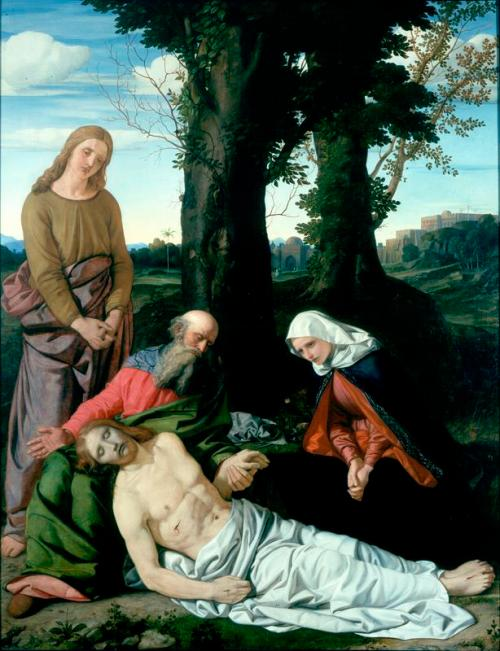
Lamentation over the Dead Christ, 1835, Aberdeen Art Gallery

Joash Shooting the Arrow of Deliverance, 1844, Hamburger Kunsthalle

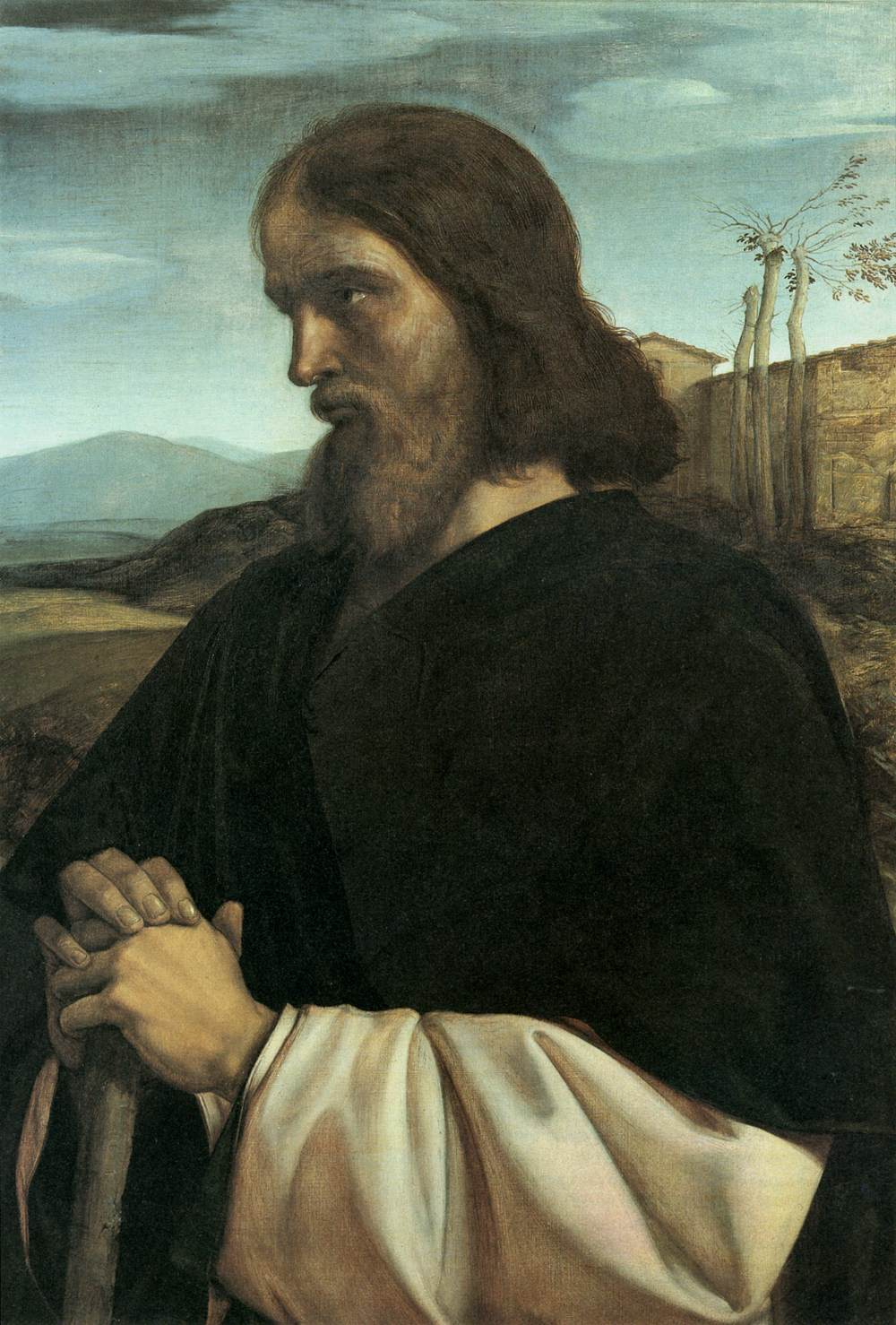
St Joseph, 1847, Windsor Castle

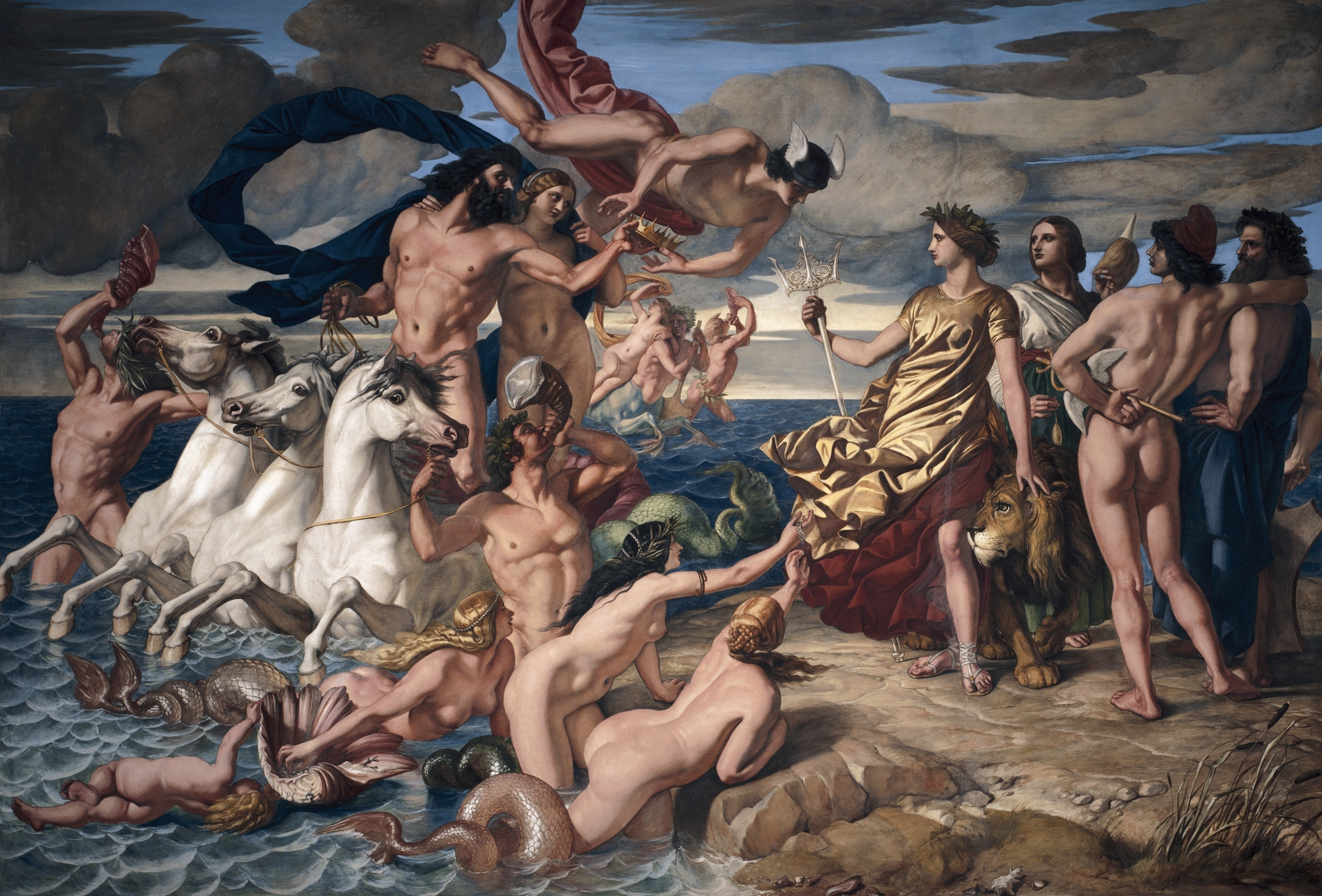
Neptune Resigning to Britannia the Empire of the Sea, 1847, Osborne House

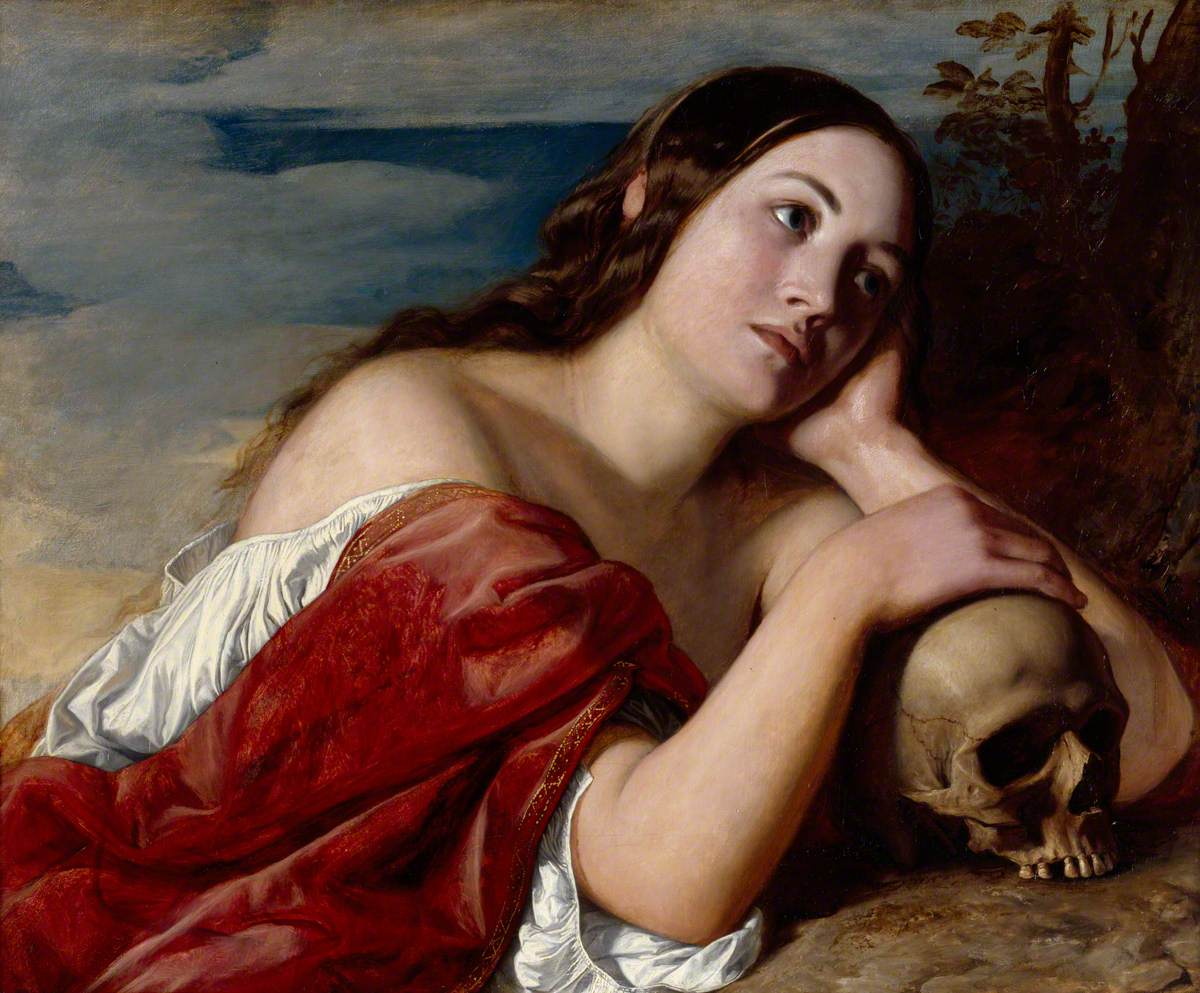
Omnia Vanitas, 1848

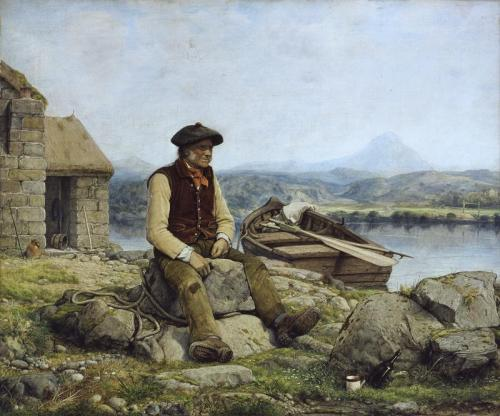
The Highland Ferryman, 1857, Aberdeen Art Gallery

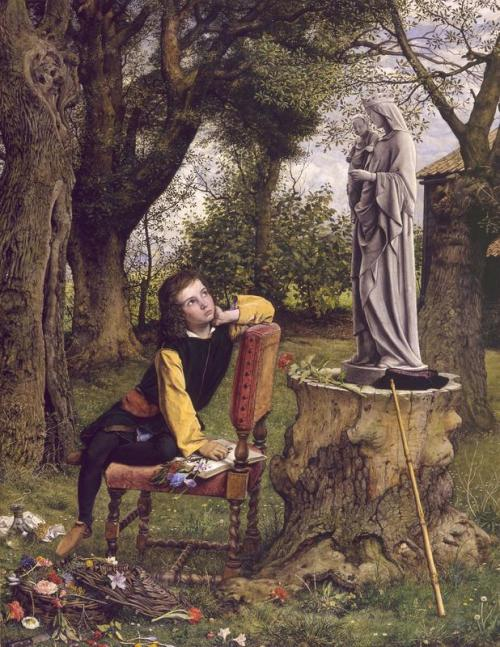
Titian Preparing To Make His First Essay in Colouring, 1856–1857, Aberdeen Art Gallery

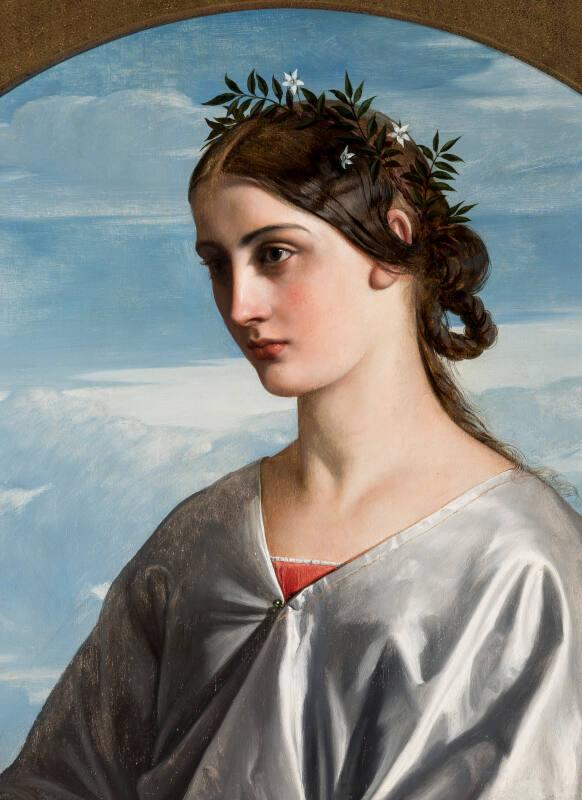
Beatrice, 1859, Aberdeen Art Gallery

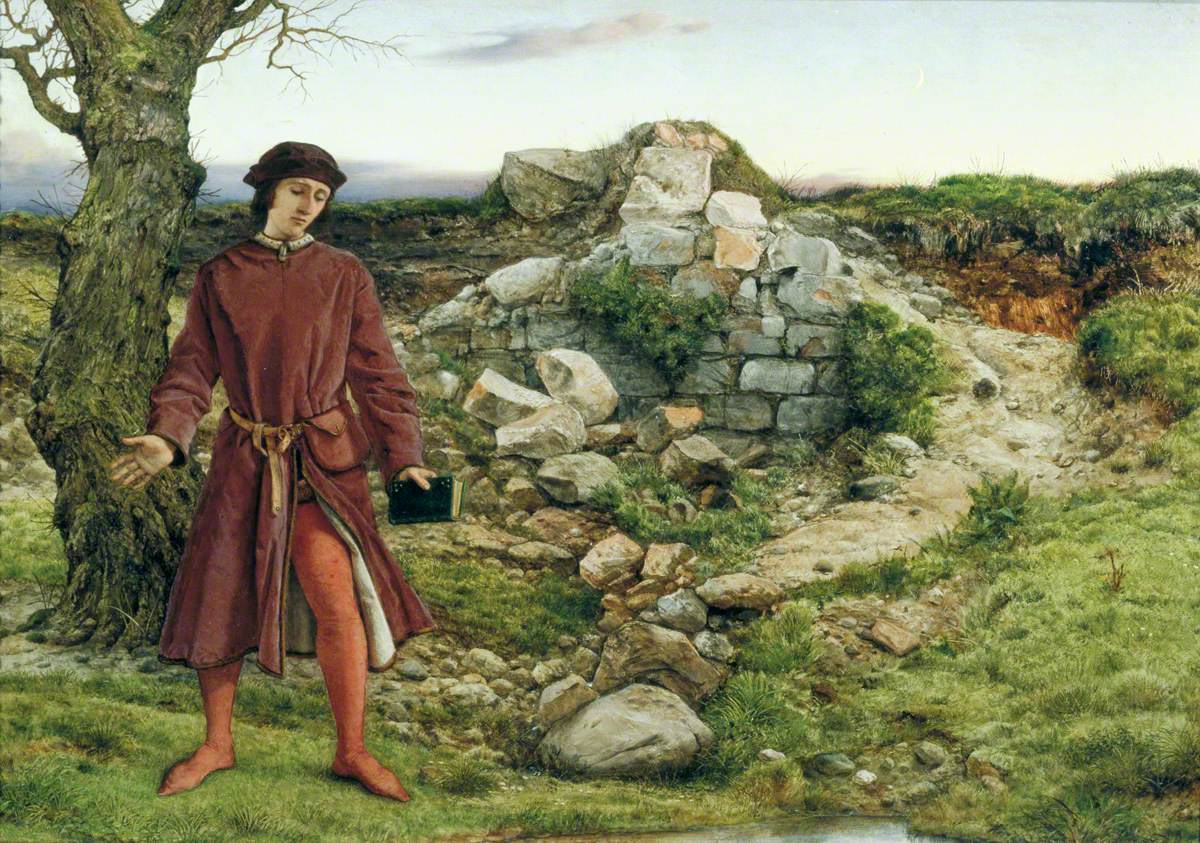
Henry VI at Towton, 1860

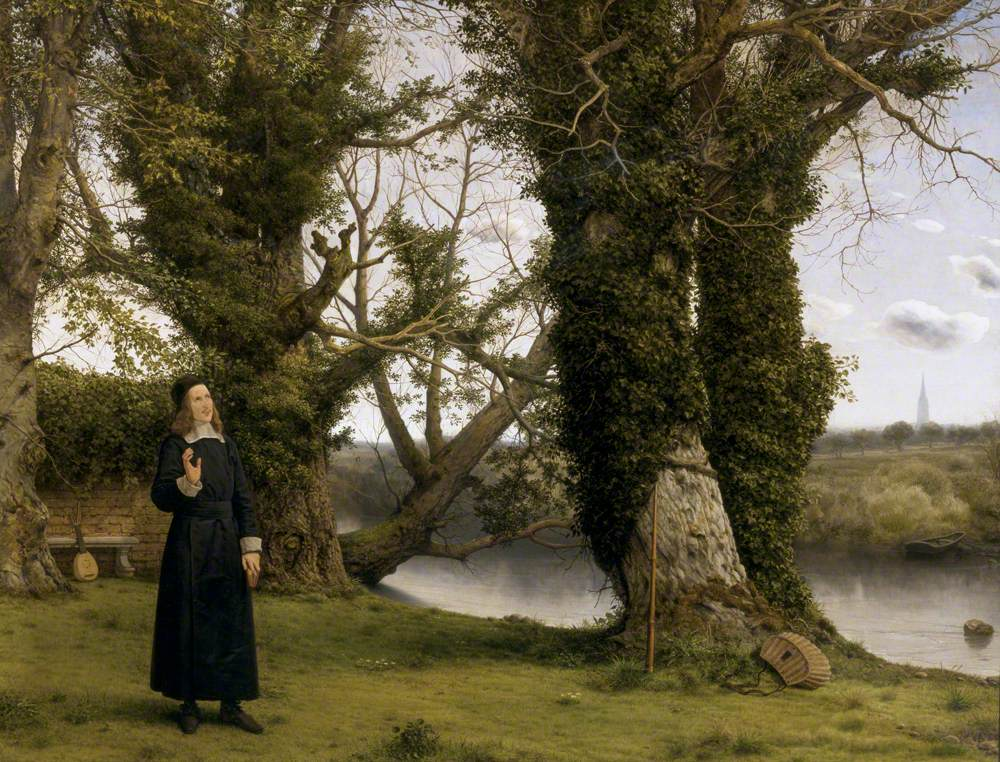
George Herbert at Bemerton 1860
