= James Poole (painter) =

English painter

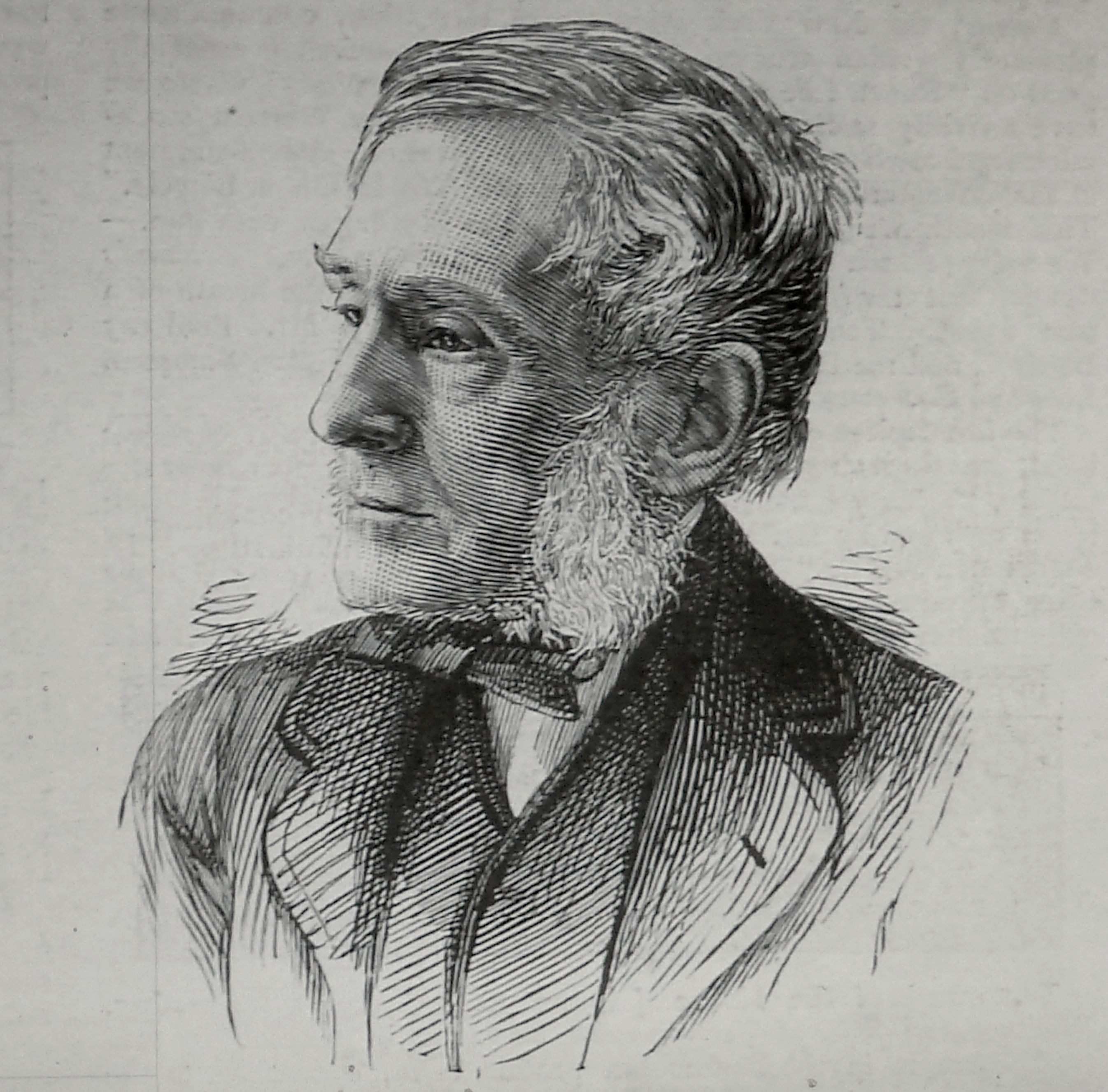
- James Poole
- Born: 29 January 1804; Birmingham
- Died: 14 March 1886 (aged 82); Sheffield
- Known for: Landscapes

James Poole (29 January 1804 – 14 March 1886) was a landscape painter of Ecclesall Manor House, Sheffield, West Riding of Yorkshire, England. He was born in Birmingham and died in Sheffield.

== Gallery ==
Black Cuillin in Skye by James Poole

Cinderella, a favourite cob of Mrs Henry Walker's, and her coachman William Sales, in Scarborough by James Poole

Off Machon Bank, Sheffield by James Poole

The head of Lake Lucerne, Switzerland by James Poole

Clogwyn Mawr, near Capel Curig by James Poole

Falls near Pont-y-Cefn by James Poole
