= 1844 in art =

Events from the year 1844 in art.

== Events ==
- The Gypsotheca Canoviana at the Museo Canova in Possagno is completed.
- June – Henry Fox Talbot begins publication of The Pencil of Nature, the first book illustrated with photographs from a camera to be commercially published (in London).
- July 31 – Opening of the Wadsworth Atheneum, which is today the oldest art museum in the United States.

== Works ==
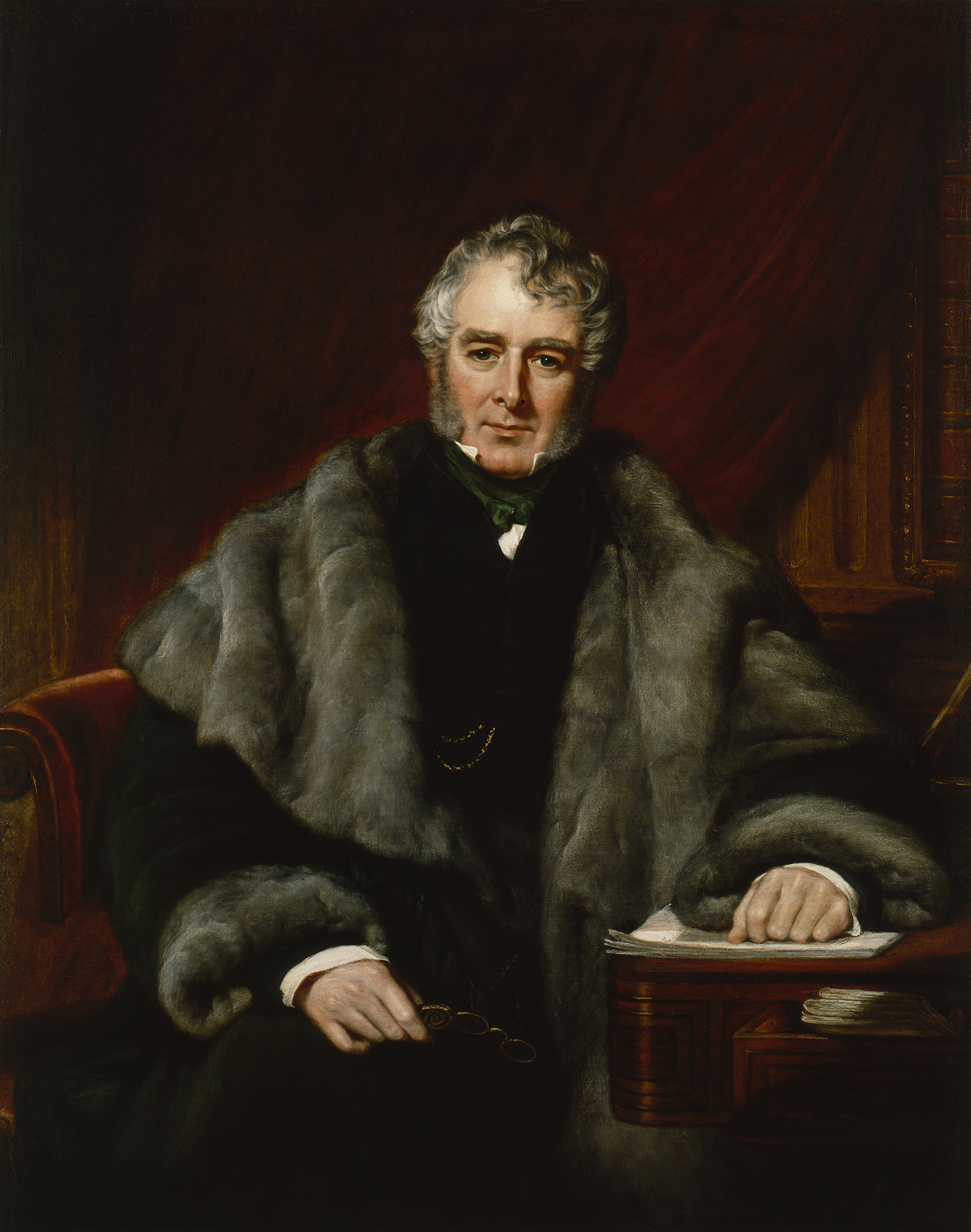
Portrait of Lord Melbourne by John Partridge.

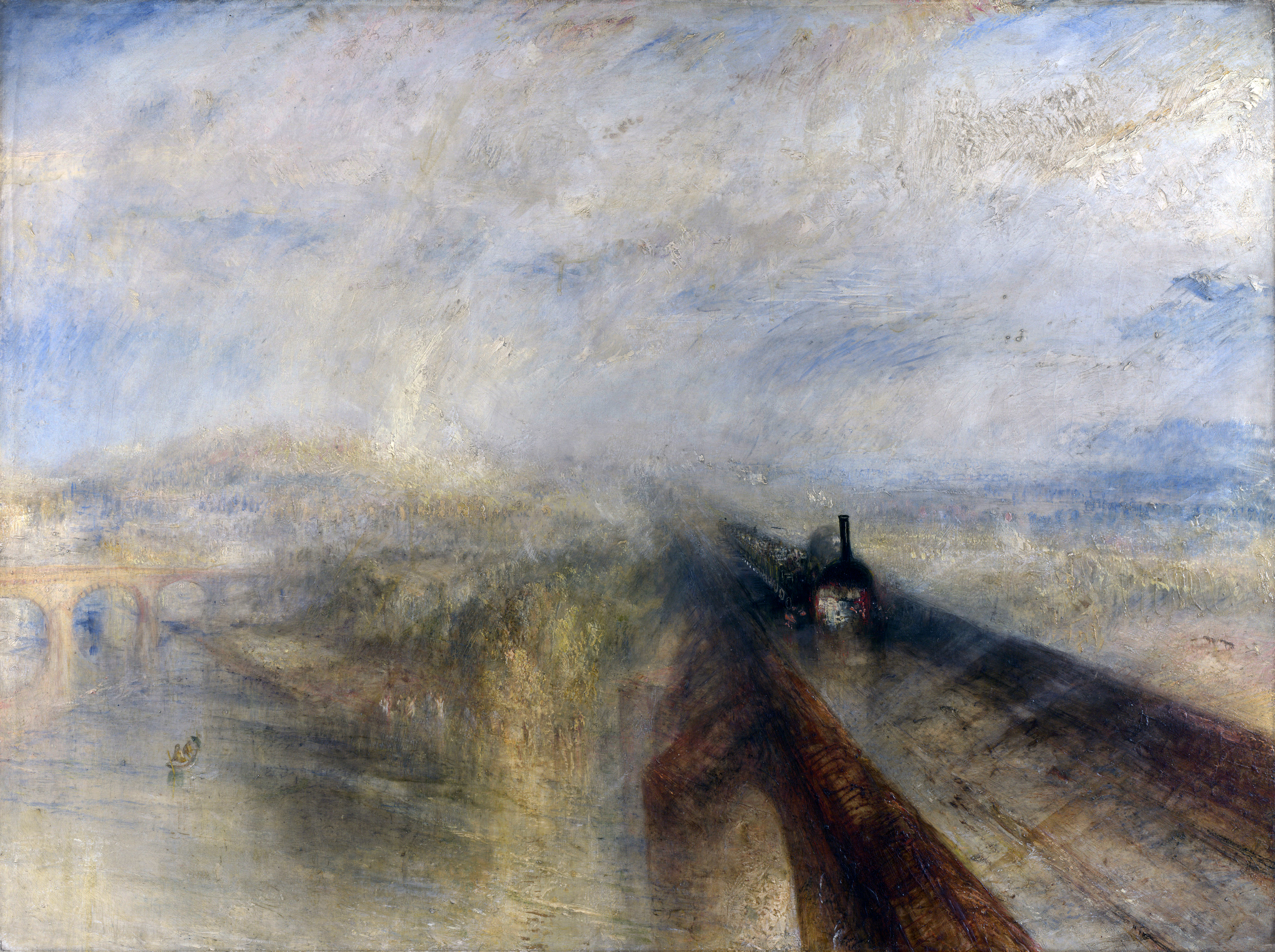
Turner – Rain, Steam and Speed

- József Borsos – Portrait of Kristóf Hegedűs
- Ford Madox Brown – The Bromley Family
- William Collins – Seaford, Sussex
- Charles West Cope – Palpitation
- Gustave Courbet
  - Portrait of Juliette Courbet (Musée du Petit Palais, Paris)
  - The Hammock
- Thomas Couture – The Love of Gold
- Thomas Creswick – Scene on the Tummel, Perthshire
- Honoré Daumier – Les bas bleus ("Bluestockings", series of lithographs)
- Eugène Delacroix – Last Words of the Emperor Marcus Aurelius
- William Dyce – Joash Shooting the Arrow of Deliverance
- William Powell Frith – John Knox Reproving Mary, Queen of Scots
- Théodore de Gudin – La Salle's Expedition to Louisiana in 1684
- Joseph Patrick Haverty – Patrick O'Brien: The Limerick Piper
- Edwin Landseer – Shoeing
- Carlo Marochetti – Wellington Statue, Glasgow (equestrian bronze)
- Eleuterio Pagliano – İl pepe e il peperoncino
- Dominique Papety – The Temptation of Saint Hilarion
- John Partridge – Portrait of Lord Melbourne
- Henri Félix Emmanuel Philippoteaux – The Battle of Rivoli
- Francesco Podesti – The Oath of the Anconetani
- Richard Redgrave
  - The Governess
  - The Sempstress
- Hiram Powers – The Greek Slave (marble)
- Frederick Richard Say – Portrait of the Earl of Derby
- Clarkson Stanfield
  - The Morning after the Wreck
  - Oude Scheld – Texel Island
- J. M. W. Turner
  - Approach to Venice
  - Ostend
  - Rain, Steam and Speed – The Great Western Railway (National Gallery, London)
  - Venice, Maria della Salute
  - Venice Quay, Ducal Palace
- Horace Vernet – Jeremiah on the Ruins of Jerusalem
- Peter von Hess – Crossing the Berezina River
- William Lindsay Windus - The Black Boy (International Slavery Museum, Liverpool)

== Births ==
- February 20 – Mihály Munkácsy, Hungarian painter (died 1909)
- February 26 – Annie Swynnerton, English painter (died 1933)
- March 10 - Marie Spartali Stillman, English model and painter (died 1927)
- April – Edmund Elisha Case, American painter (died 1919)
- April 14 – Pierre-Adrien Dalpayrat, French ceramicist (died 1910)
- May 21 – Henri Rousseau, "Le Douanier Rousseau", French modernist primitive painter (died 1910)
- May 22 – Mary Cassatt, American Impressionist painter (died 1926)
- July 25
  - Thomas Eakins, American painter, photographer and sculptor (died 1916)
  - Amanda Sidwall, Swedish painter (died 1892)
- July 31 – Léon Augustin Lhermitte, French genre painter (died 1925)
- August 5 – Ilya Repin, Russian painter and sculptor (died 1930)
- September 20 – William H. Illingworth, American photographer (died 1893)
- October 22 – Lady Margaret Forrest, French-born Australian patron of the arts (died 1929)
- October 25 – Viktor Oskar Tilgner, Austrian sculptor (died 1896)
- October 28 – Moses Jacob Ezekiel, American sculptor (died 1917)
- date unknown – Susan Isabel Dacre, English painter (died 1933)

== Deaths ==
- February 21 – Jacques-Edme Dumont, French sculptor (born 1761)
- March 6 – Francis Nicholson, English landscape painter (born 1753)
- March 24 – Bertel Thorvaldsen, Danish sculptor (born 1770)
- May 2 – William Beckford, English novelist, patron art critic (born 1760)
- May 5 – Andrew Geddes, British painter (born 1783)
- May 14 – Robert Hills, English painter and etcher (born 1769)
- July 23 – Christian Gobrecht, American engraver (born 1785)
- August 6 – Samuel Drummond, British painter especially portraits and marine genre works (born 1766)
- August 28 – Giuseppe Bernardino Bison, Italian painter, especially of history pieces, genre depictions, and whimsical and imaginary landscapes (born 1762)
- October 14
  - Adélaïde Victoire Hall, French painter (born 1772)
  - Jan Baptiste de Jonghe, Belgian landscape painter (born 1785)
- November 2 – Sir Augustus Wall Callcott, English landscape painter (born 1779)
- November 18 – Antonín Machek, Czech painter (born 1775)
- date unknown
  - Arnoldus Bloemers, Dutch painter of flowers, fruit, and animals (born 1792)
  - Giovacchino Cantini, Italian engraver (born c.1780)
  - Frédéric Théodore Faber, Belgian landscape and genre painter (born 1782)
  - Qian Du, Chinese landscape painter during the Qing dynasty (born 1764)
  - Alexander Johann Dallinger von Dalling, Austrian painter (born 1783)
