= Salon of 1844 =

1844 art exhibition in Paris

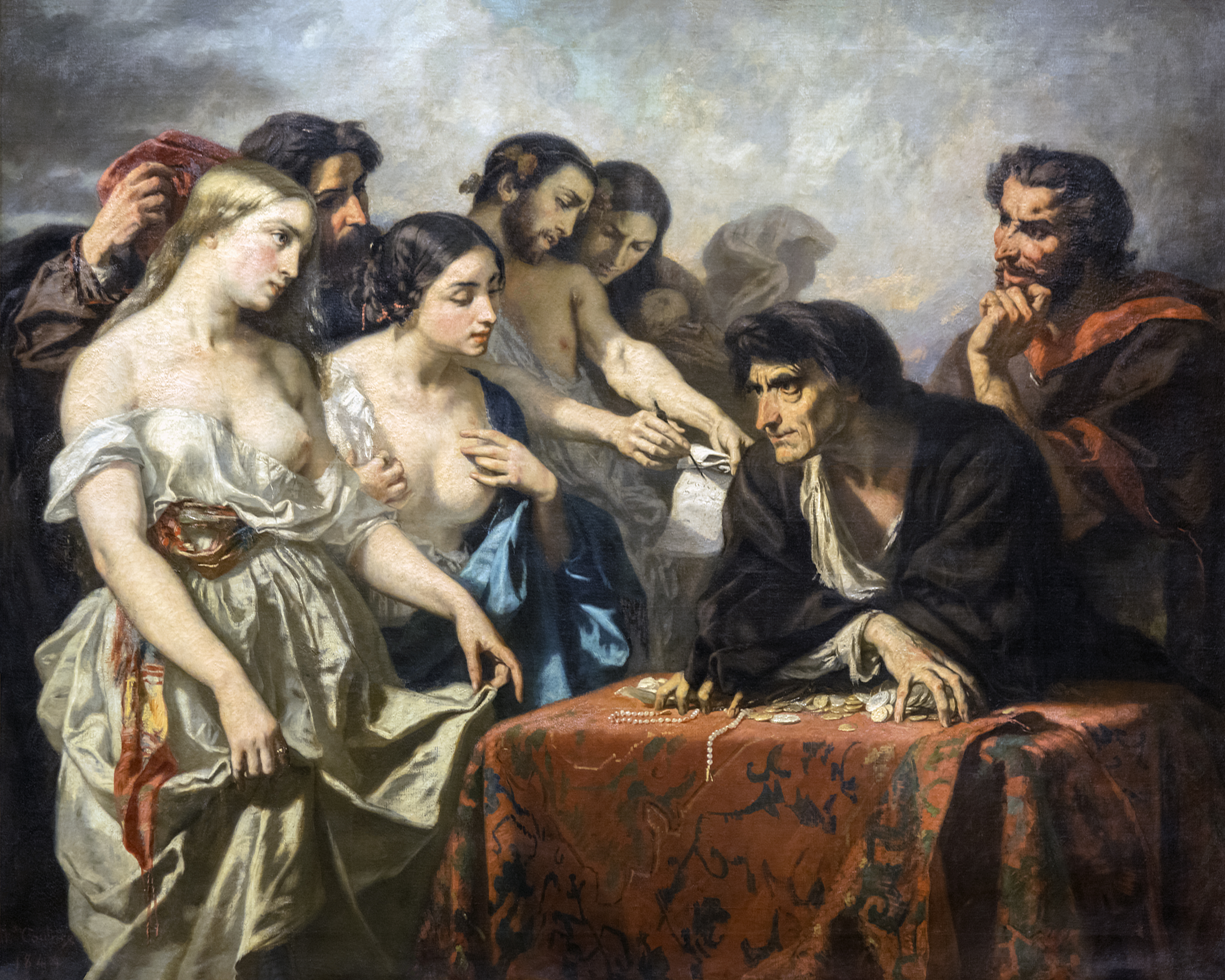
The Love of Gold by Thomas Couture

The Salon of 1844 was an art exhibition held at the Louvre in Paris. The annual Salon was organised by the Académie des Beaux-Arts and featured submissions from the leading artists and sculptors of the July Monarchy era. It continued to foreground the themes of Romanticism and Orientalism. Significantly, however, the Realist painter Gustave Courbet had his first piece of work Self-Portrait with a Black Dog accepted for the Salon. Several works commissioned for the Salles des Croisades at the Palace of Versailles were exhibited.

Other paintings on display included The Temptation of Saint Hilarion by Dominique Papety and The Love of Gold by Thomas Couture. Camille Corot produced a biblical scene The Destruction of Sodom, which he reworked and exhibited again fourteen years later at the Salon of 1857.

== Gallery ==
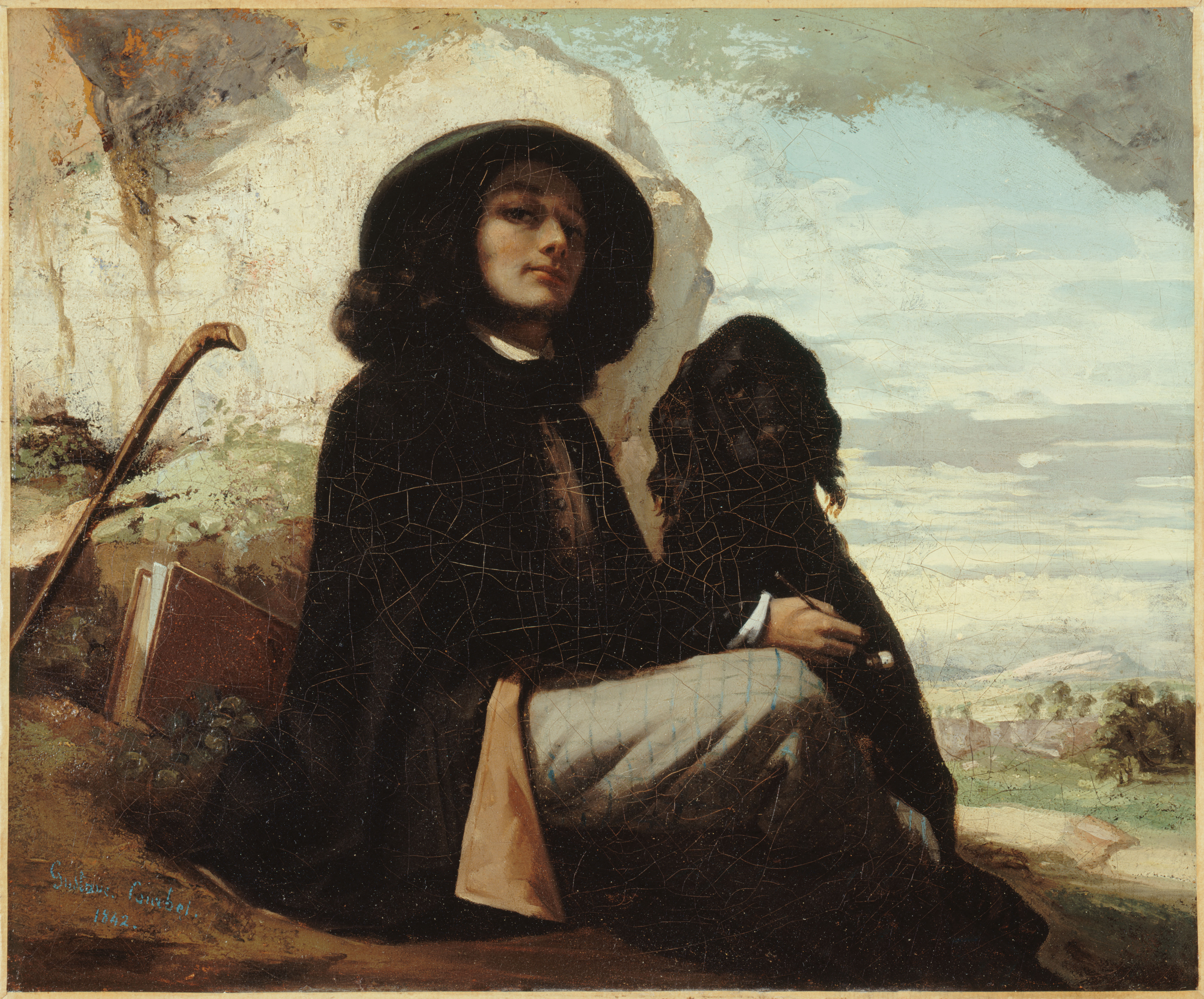
Self-Portrait with a Black Dog by Gustave Courbet

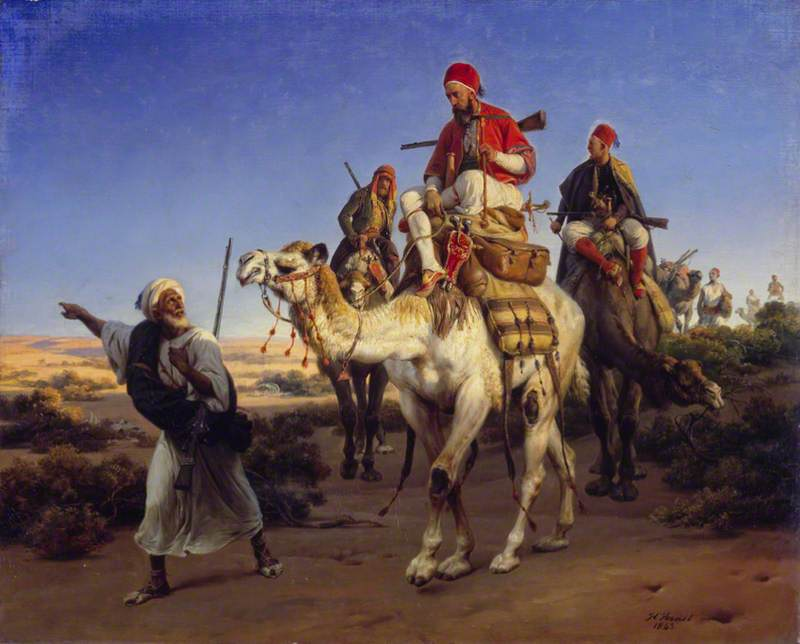
Arabs Travelling in the Desert by Horace Vernet

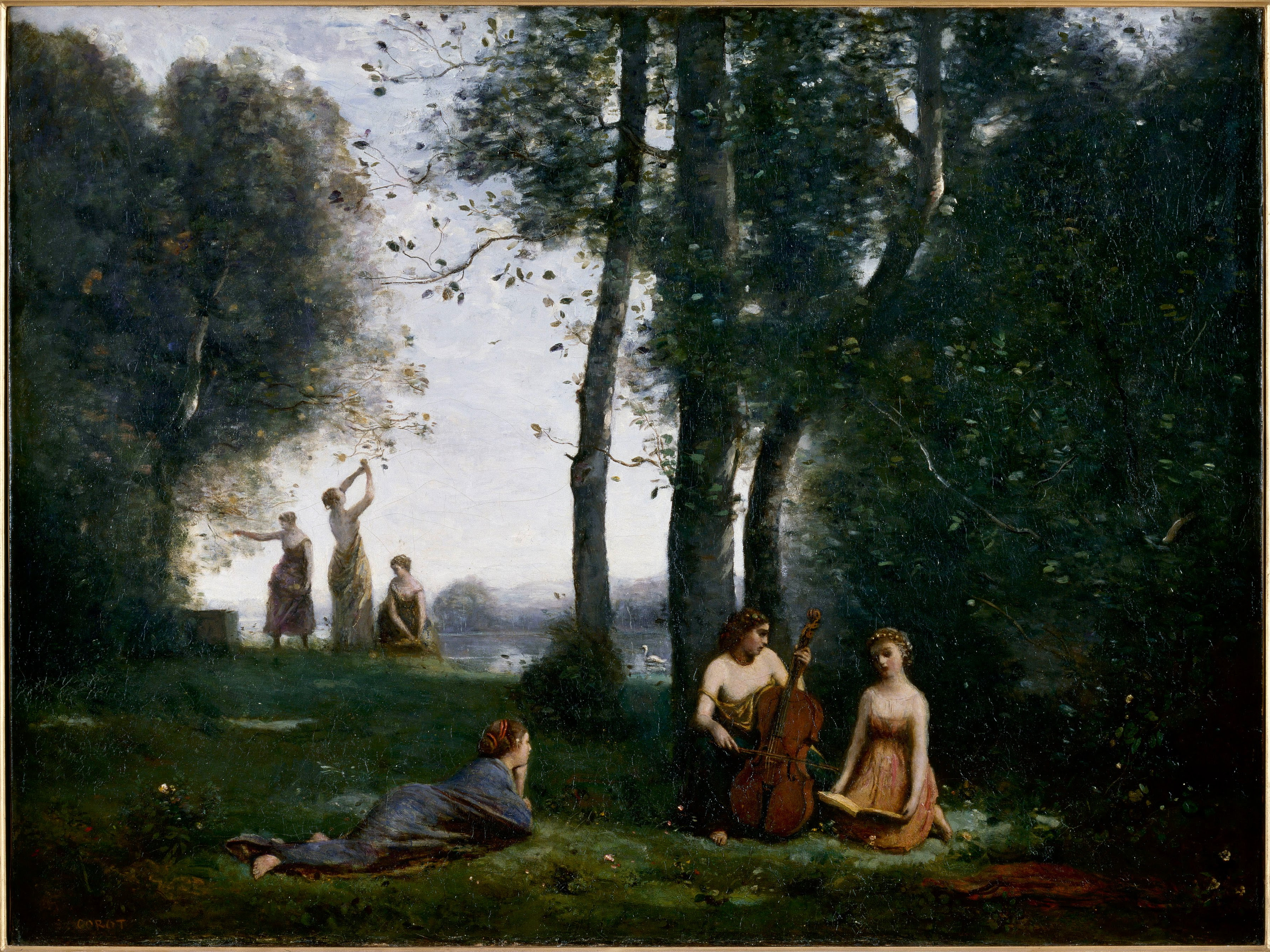
Le concert champêtre by Jean-Baptiste Camille Corot

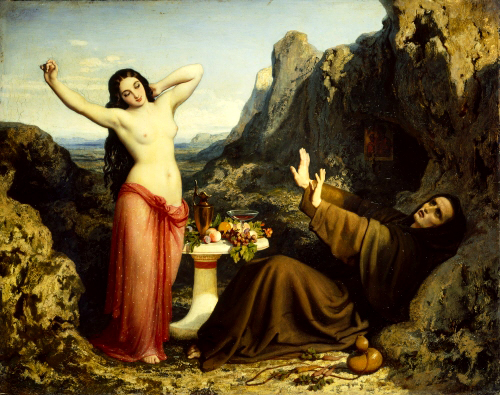
The Temptation of Saint Hilarion by Dominique Papety

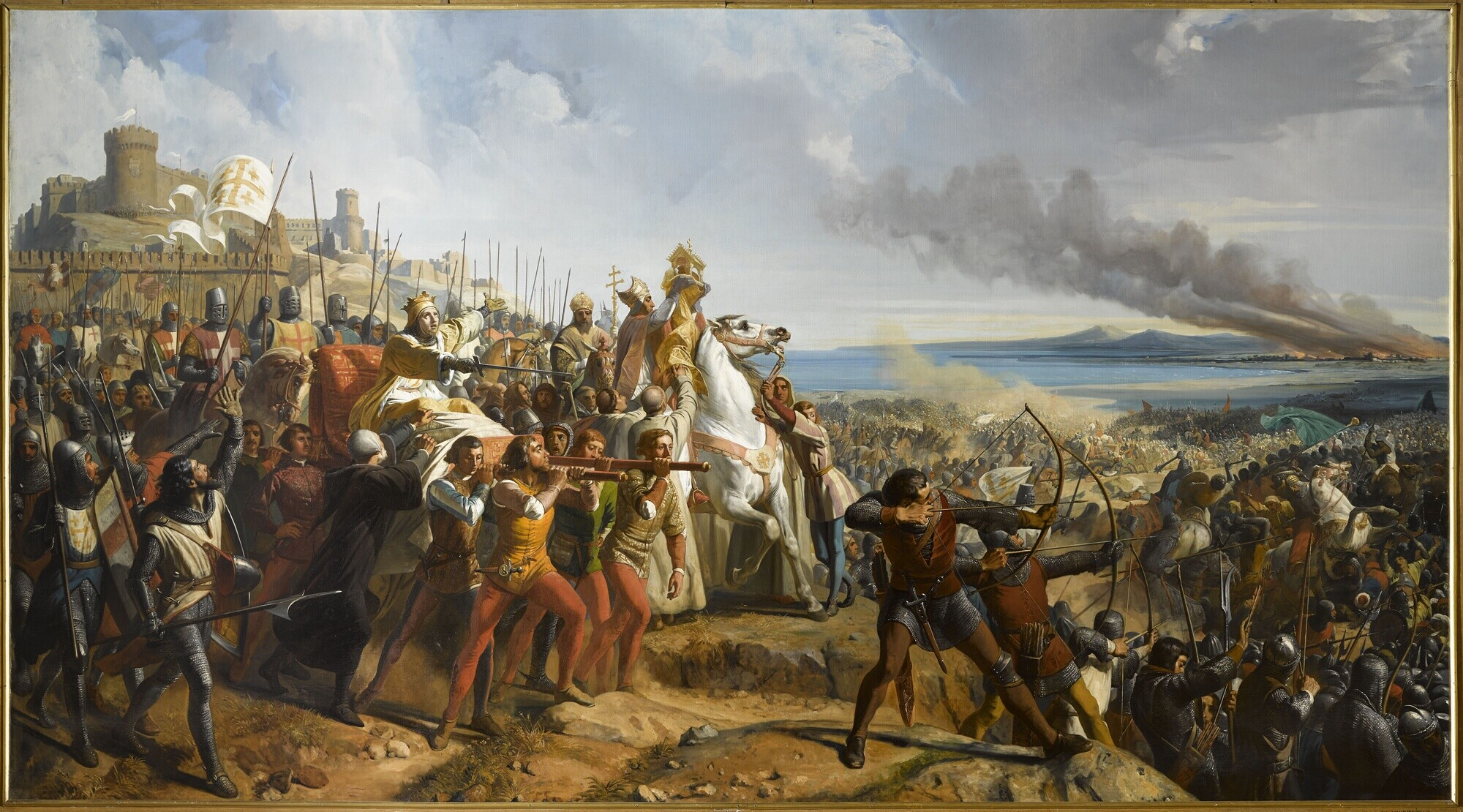
The Battle of Ascalon by Charles-Philippe Larivière

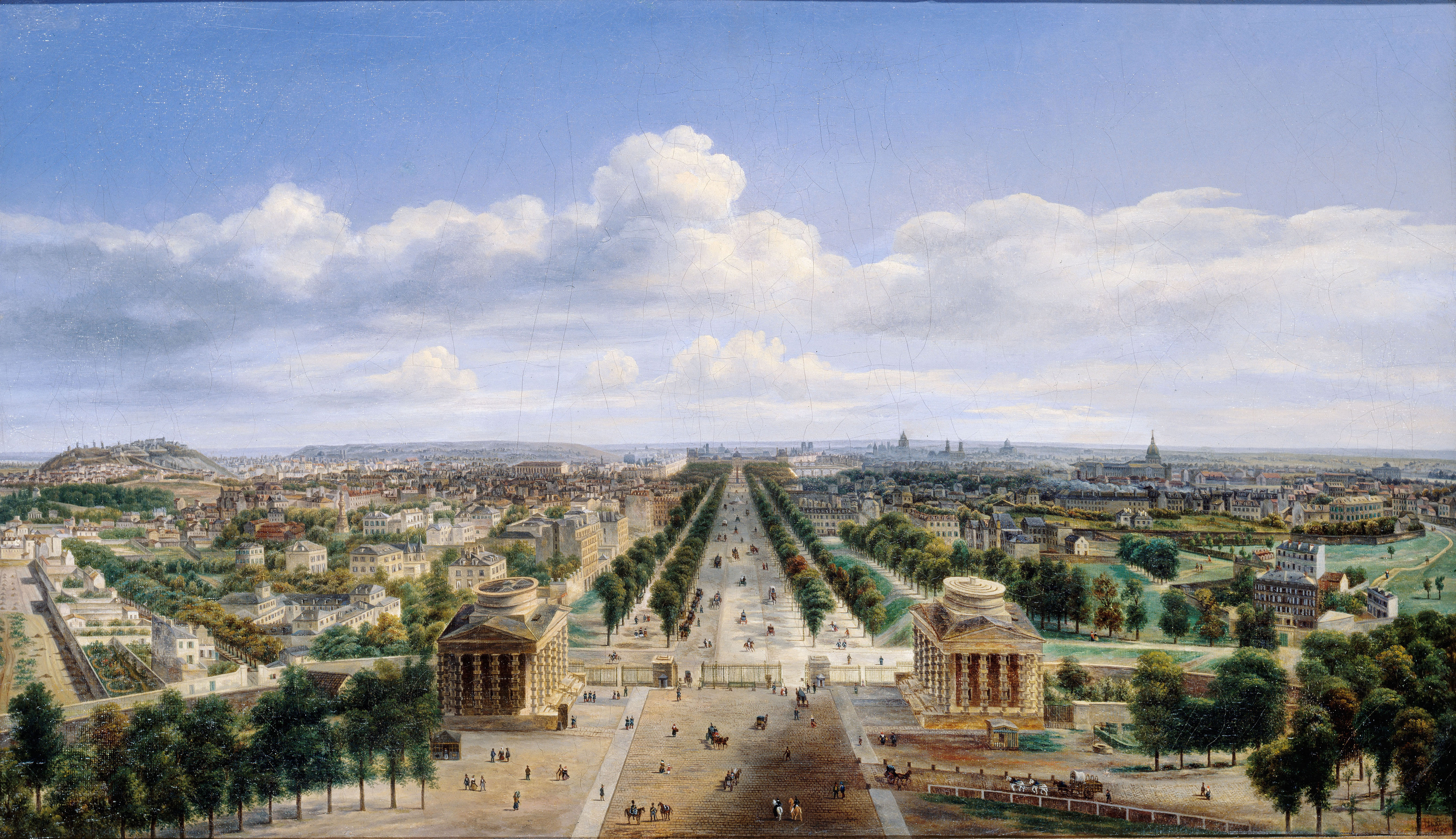
View of Paris from the Arc de Triomphe Auguste Cadolle

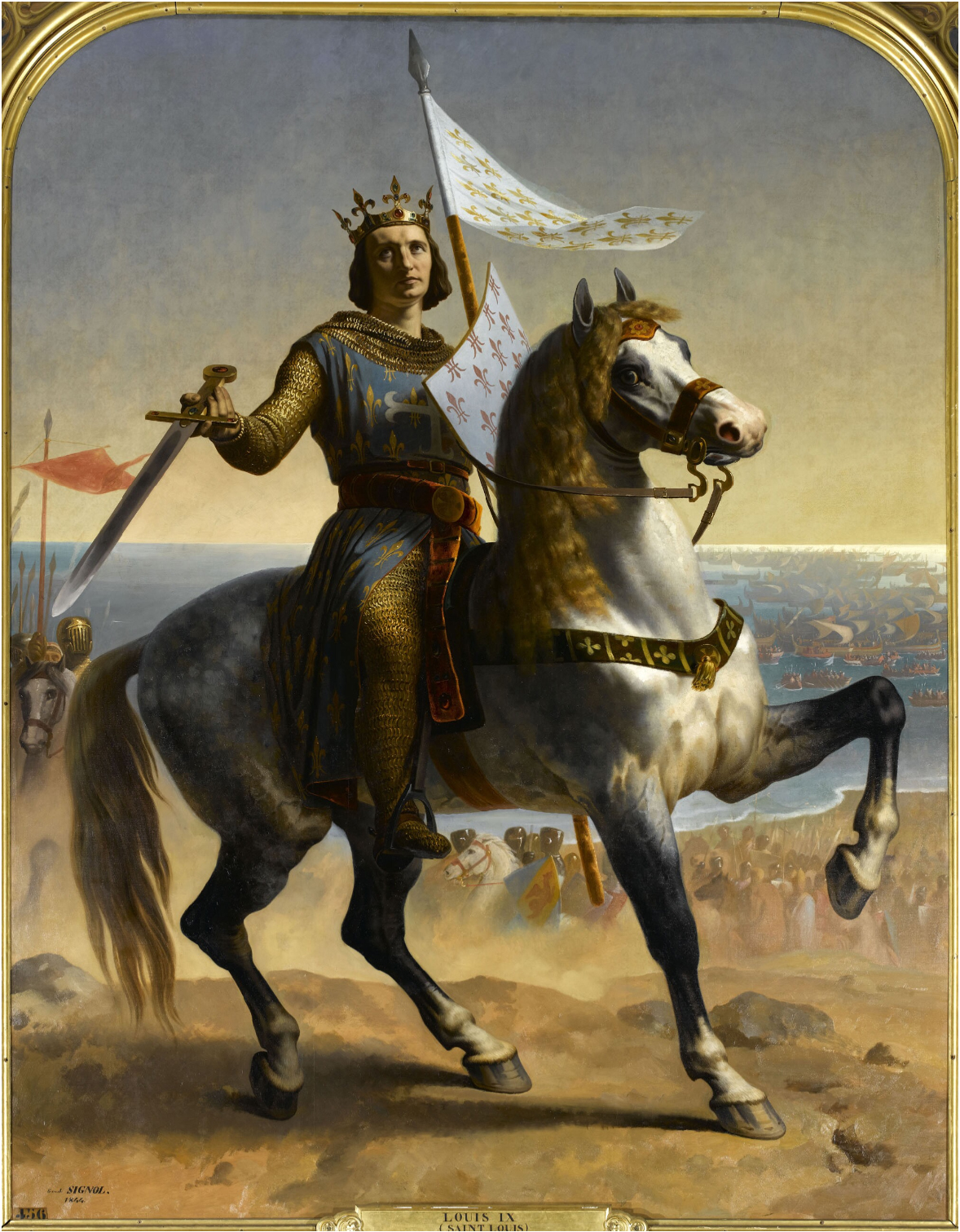
Louis IX by Émile Signol

Godfrey of Bouillon by Émile Signol

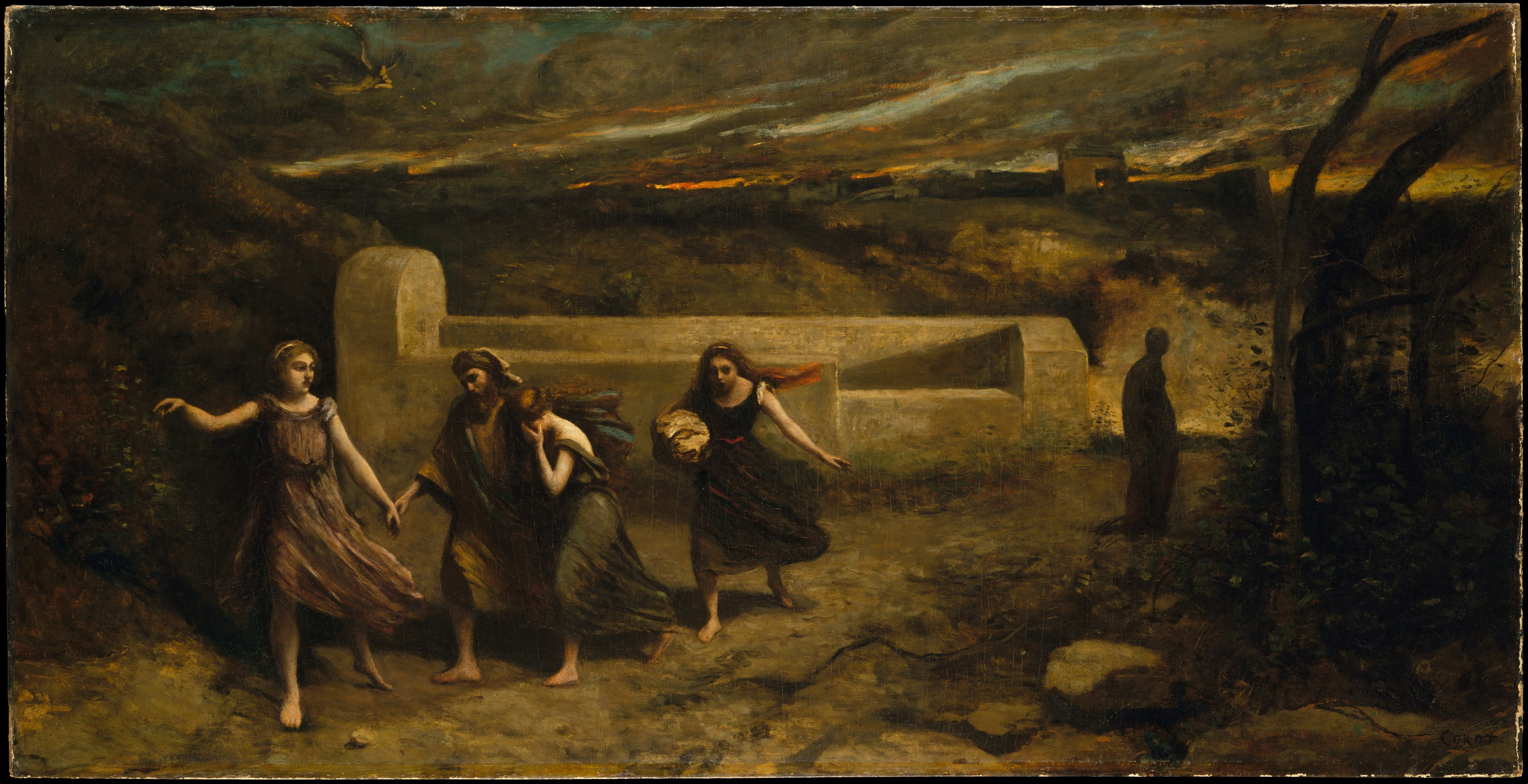
The Destruction of Sodom by Camille Corot

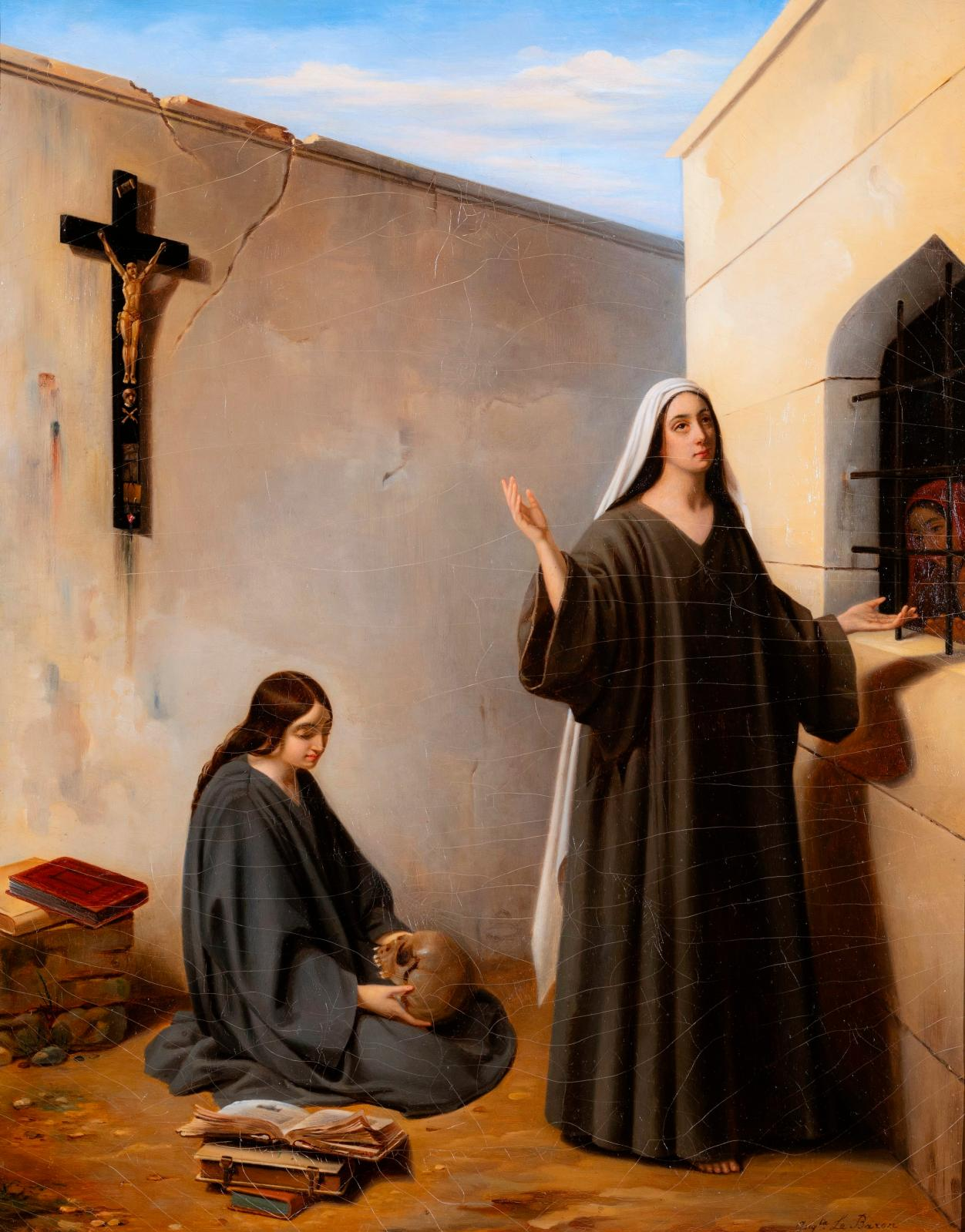
Saint Marana and Saint Cyra by Augusta Lebaron-Desves

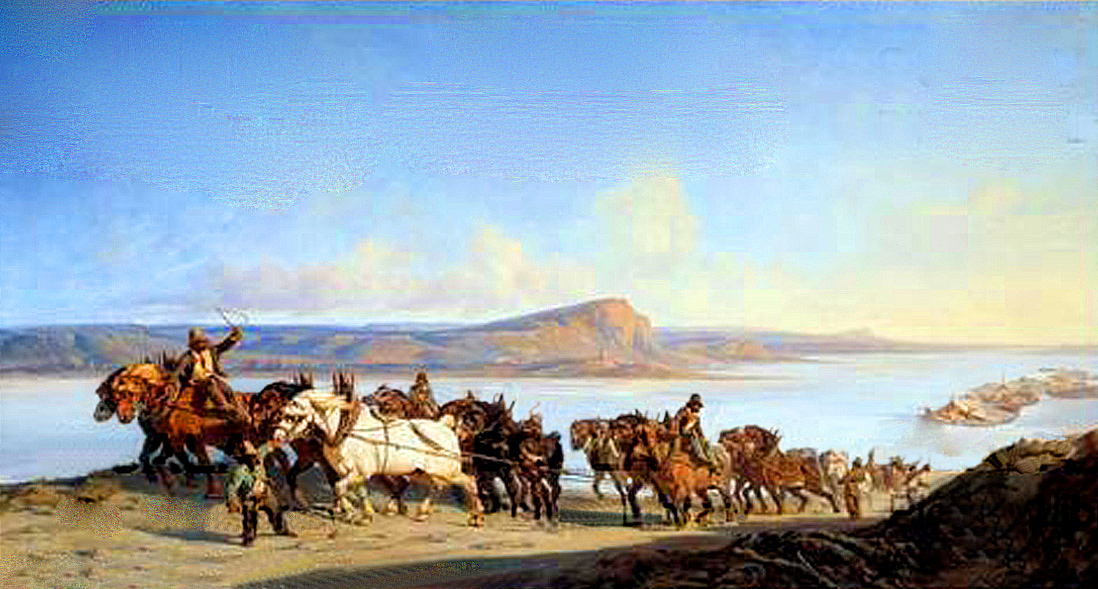
La remontée de bateaux sur le Rhône by Alexandre Dubuisson

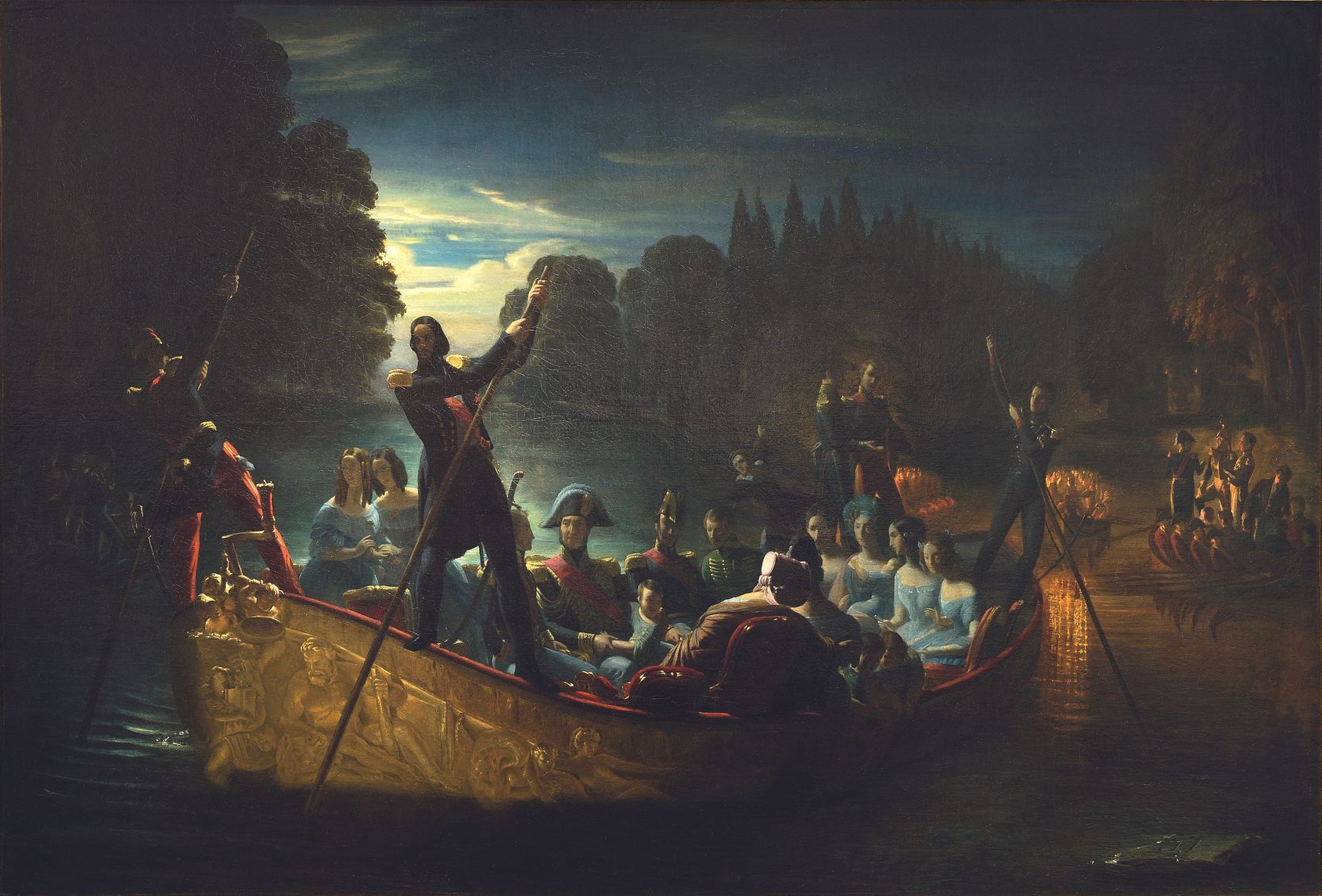
Return by boat from the Château de Saint-Cloud by Louise Philippe and his Family by Joachim Issarti

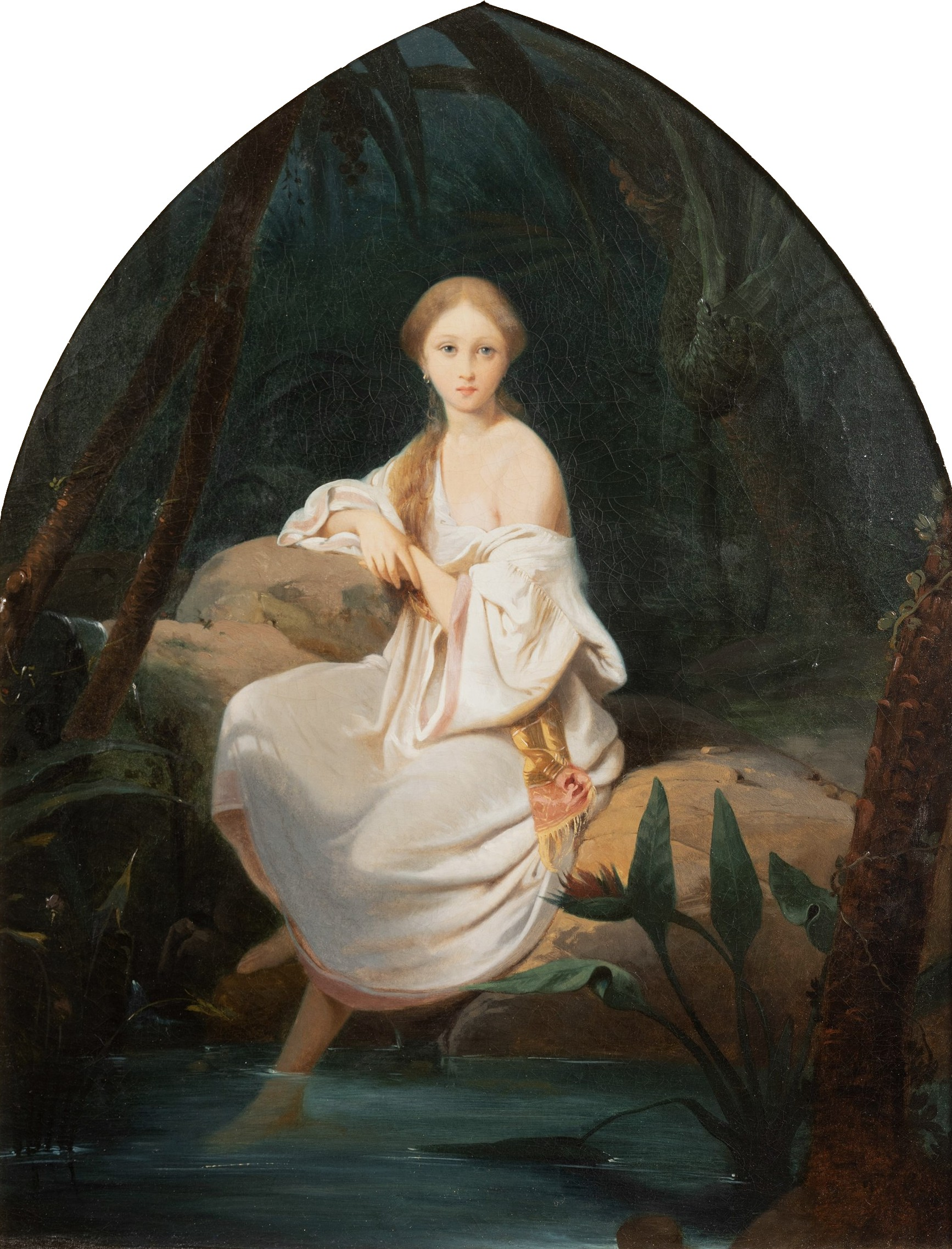
Virginie au bain by Henri Frédéric Schopin

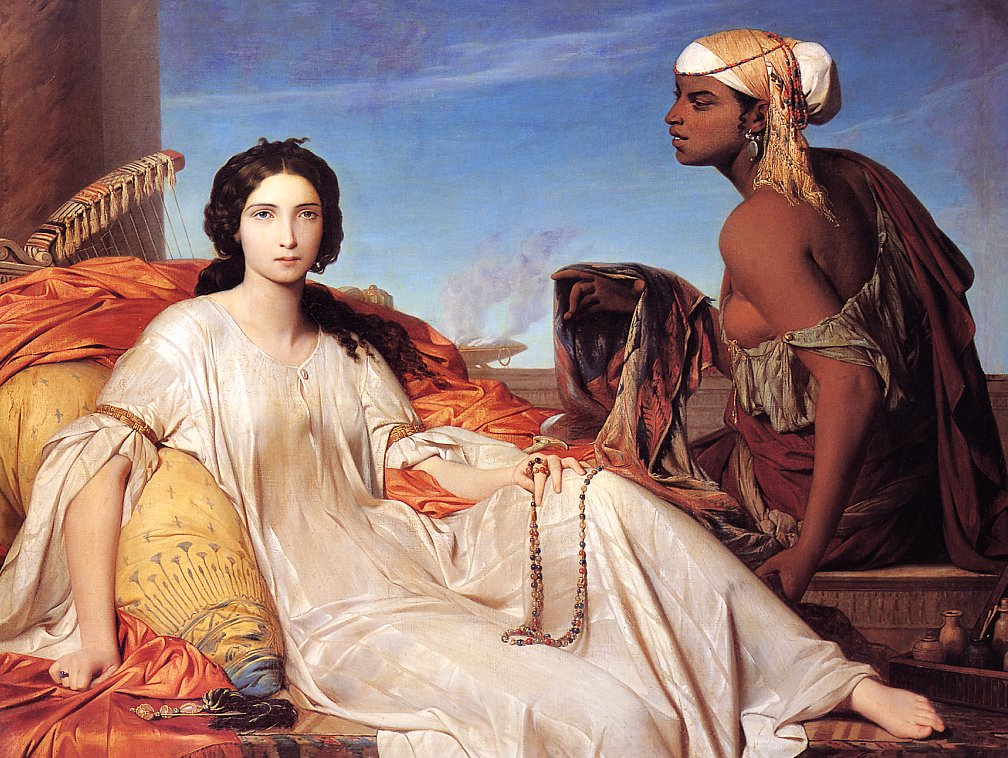
Esther and an Odalisque by François-Léon Benouville

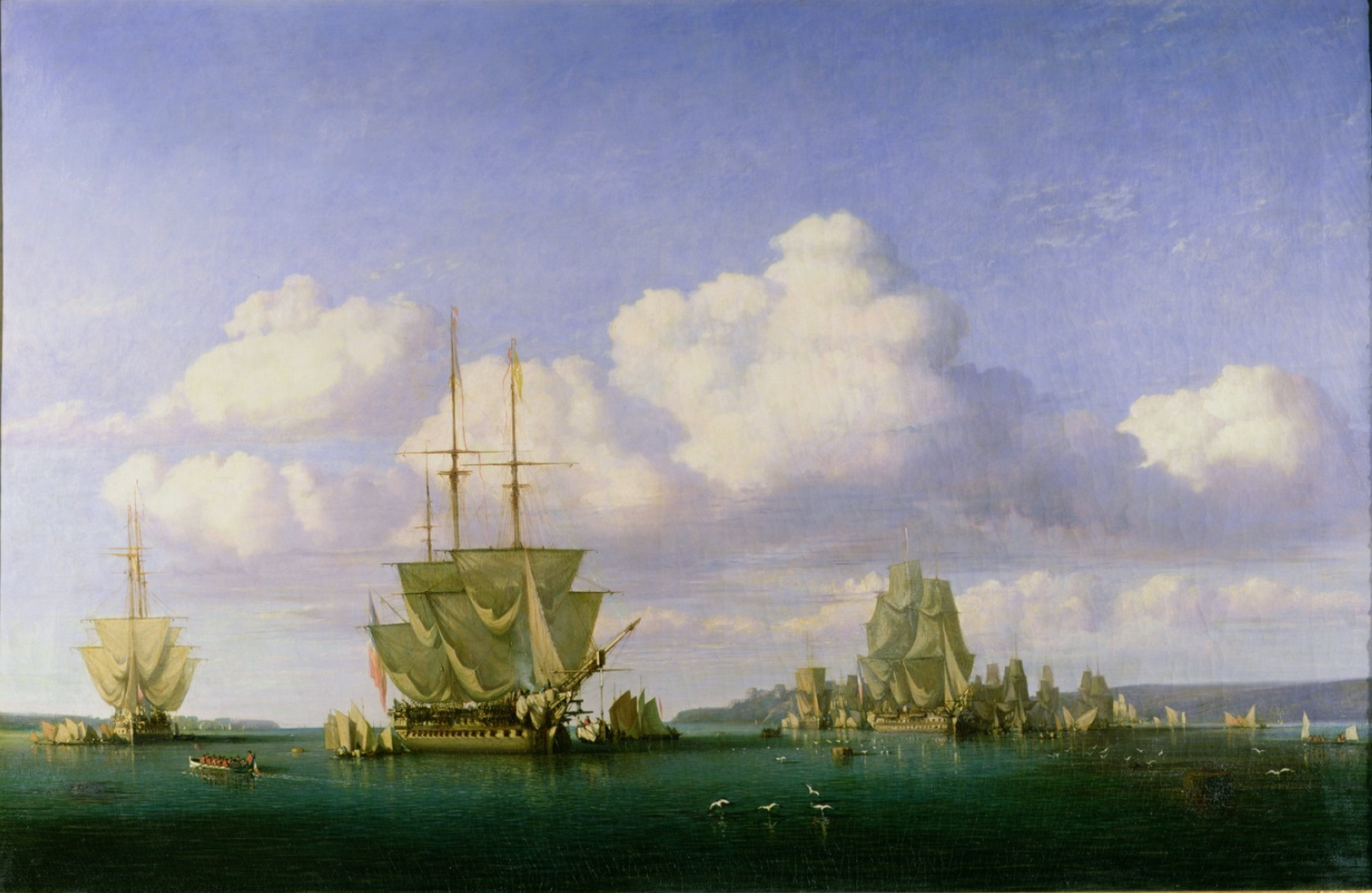
The Anchorage of Brest in Calm Weather by Jules Achille Noël

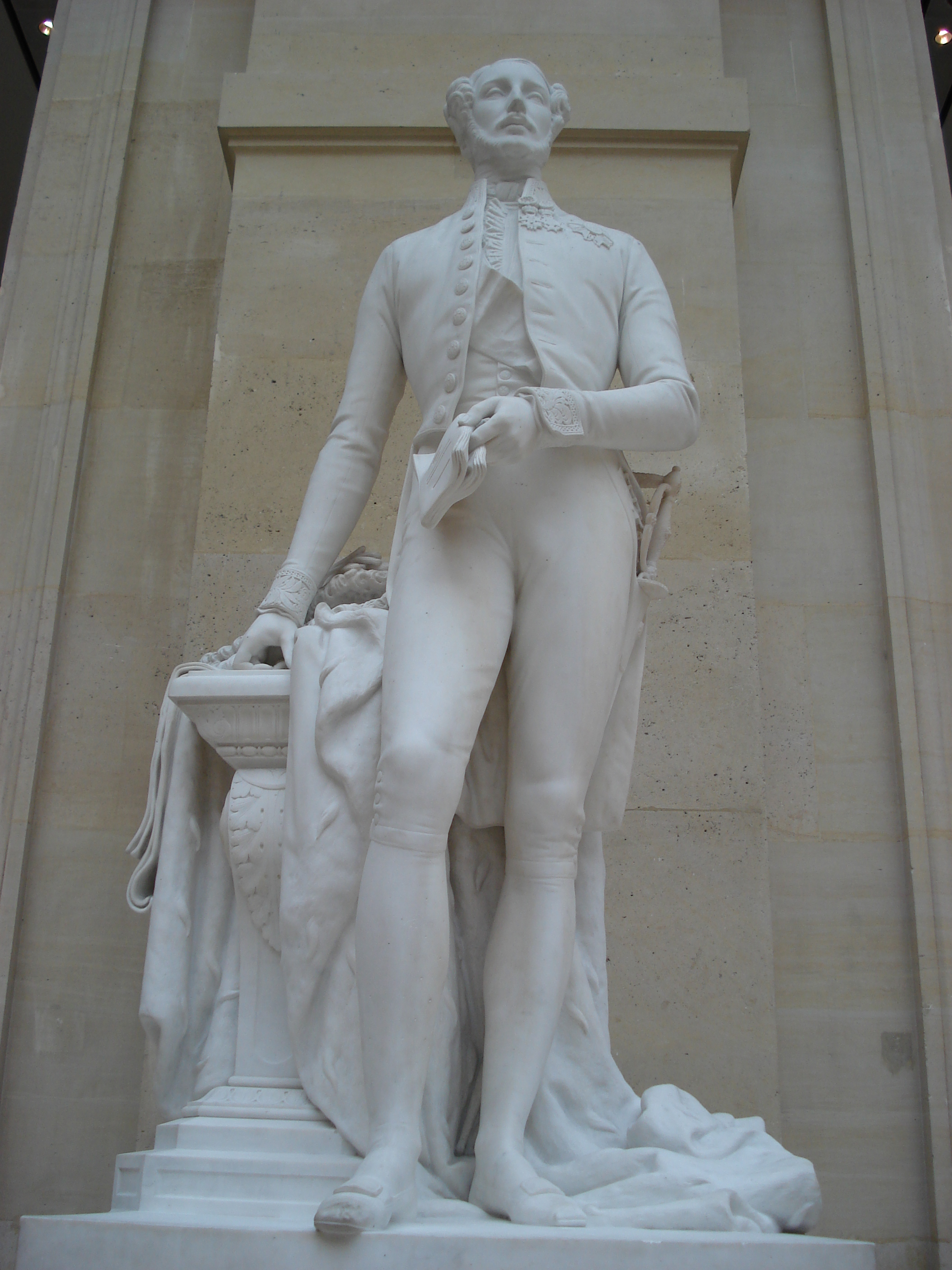
Prince Ferdinand Philippe, Duke of Orléans by Jean-Louis Jaley

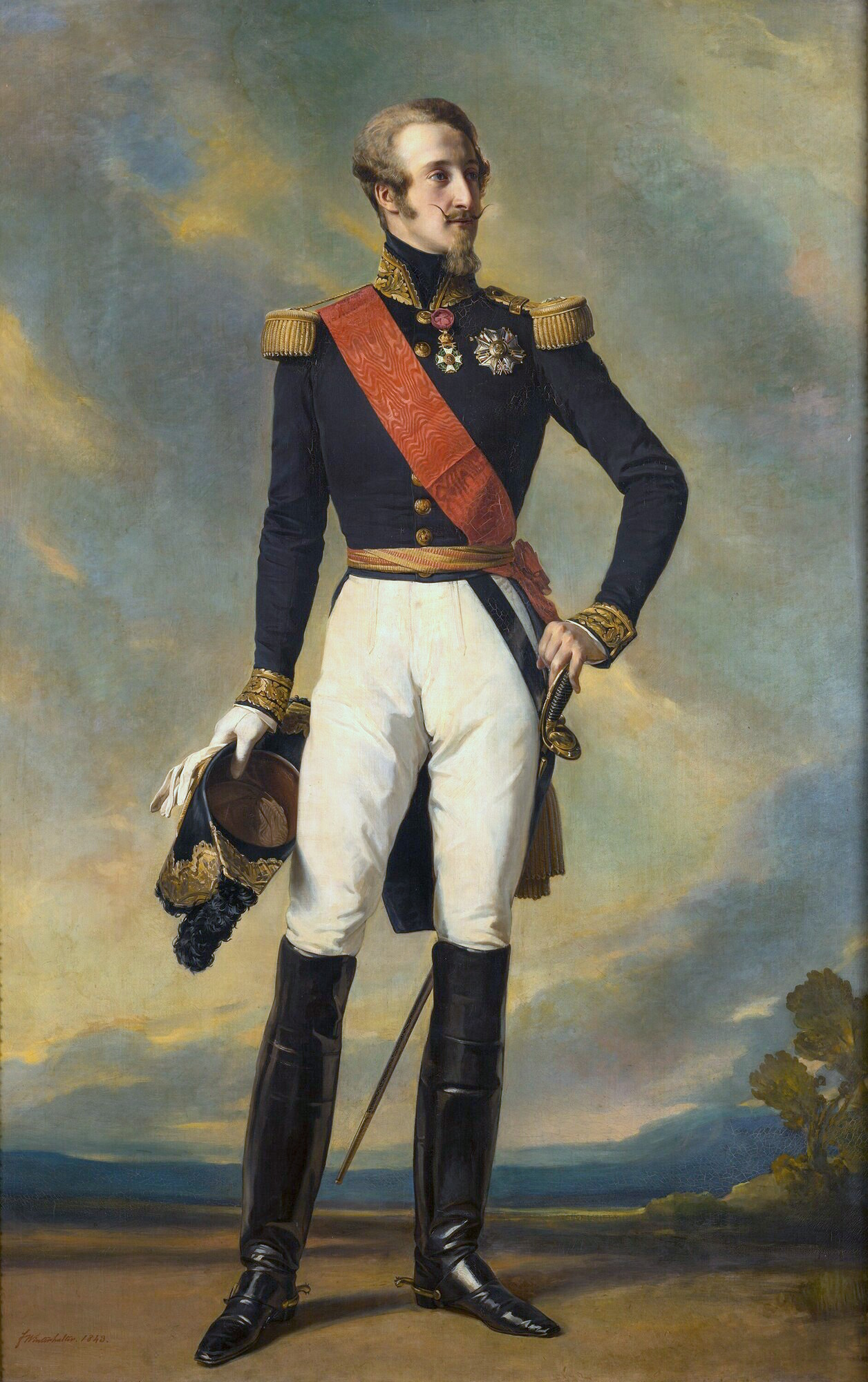
Portrait of the Duke of Nemours by Franz Xaver Winterhalter

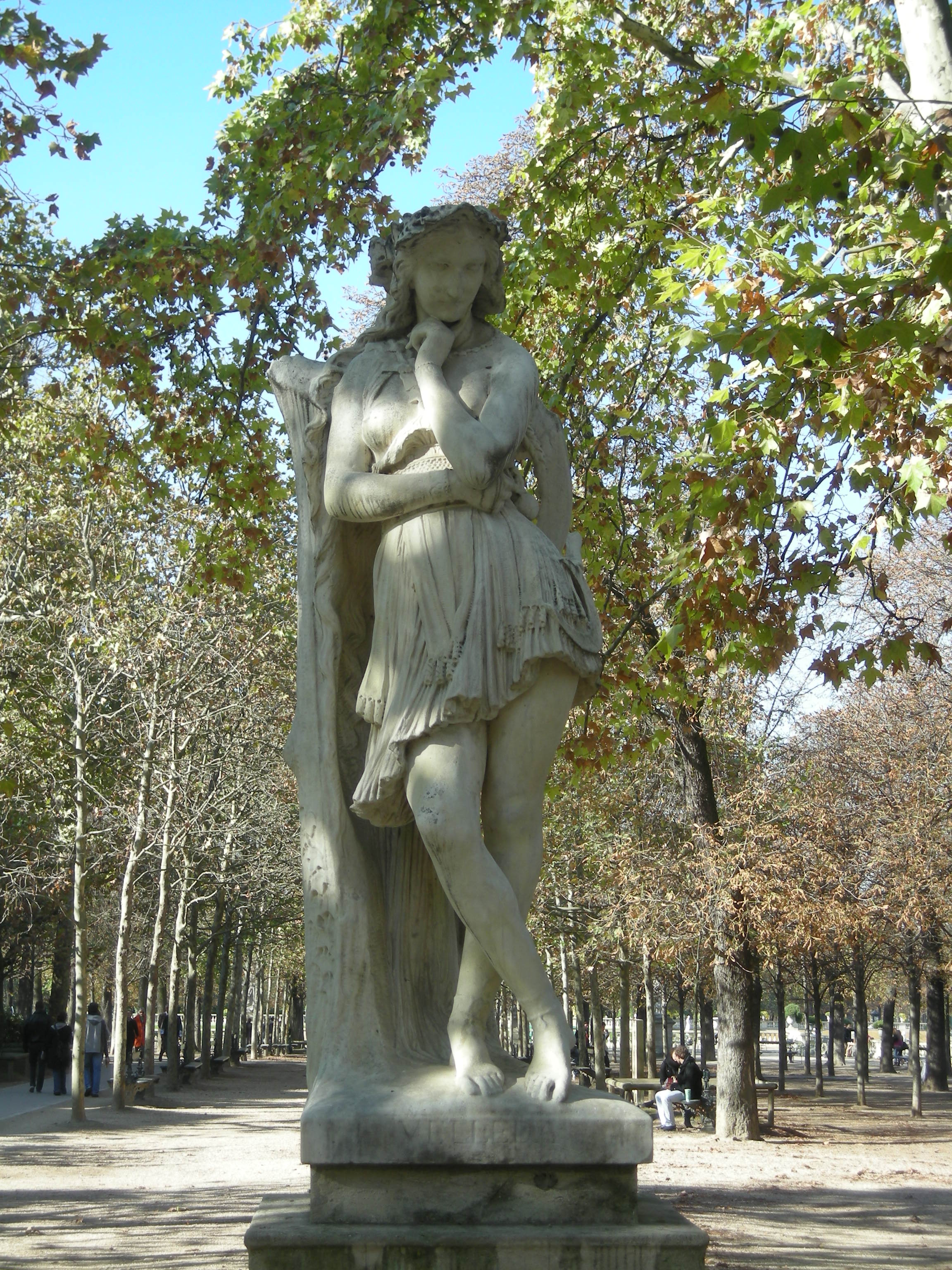
Velléda contemplant la demeure d'Eudore by Hippolyte Maindron

== Bibliography ==
- Allard, Sébastien & Fabre, Côme. Delacroix. Metropolitan Museum of Art, 2018.
- Boime, Albert. Art in an Age of Counterrevolution, 1815-1848. University of Chicago Press, 2004.
- Callen, Anthea. The Work of Art: Plein Air Painting and Artistic Identity in Nineteenth-Century France. Reaktion Books, 2015.
- Norman, Geraldine. Nineteenth-century Painters and Painting: A Dictionary. University of California Press, 1977.

== See also ==
- Royal Academy Exhibition of 1844, a contemporary event held at the National Gallery in London
