= Hegedűs =

Hegedűs or Hegedüs is a Hungarian surname; the surname's alternative form in Slovak is Hegedüš. Notable people with the surname include:

- Ádám Hegedűs (born 1989), Hungarian football player
- Adrienn Hegedűs, Hungarian tennis player
- Ágnes Hegedűs, Hungarian orienteering competitor
- Agnes Hegedüs (born 1964), Hungarian new media artist
- András Hegedüs (1922–1999), Hungarian politician
- András Hegedűs (orienteer), Hungarian orienteering competitor
- Csaba Hegedűs (footballer) (born 1985), Hungarian football player
- Csaba Hegedűs (wrestler) (born 1948), Hungarian wrestler
- Csilla Hegedüs (born 1967), Romanian politician and former Minister of Culture
- Endre Hegedűs (born 1954), Hungarian pianist
- Ferenc Hegedűs (fencer) (born 1959), Hungarian fencer
- Gyula Hegedűs (footballer) (born 1980), Hungarian football player
- Ilona Hegedűs, Hungarian writer of science fiction, fantasy and horror poetry
- Lajos Hegedűs (born 1987), Hungarian football player
- Miklós Hegedűs (born 1946), Hungarian wrestler
- Róbert Hegedűs (born 1973), Hungarian sprint canoeist
- Zsolt Hegedűs, Hungarian politician==See also==
- Portrait of Kristóf Hegedűs, 1844 painting by Hungarian painter Jozsef Borsos
