= Hilarion =

Saint of the Orthodox and Roman Catholic churches

Saint Hilarion
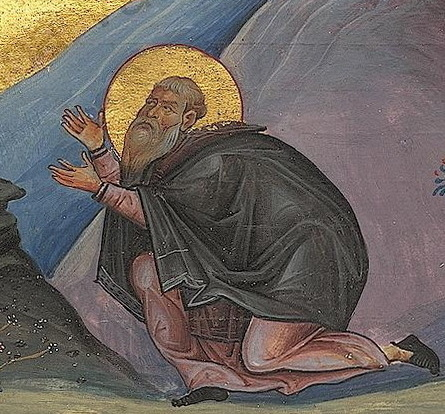
- Hilarion the Great, from the Menologion of Basil II, c. 1000 (Vatican Library)

Abbot, Venerable
- Born: AD 291; Thabatha, south of Gaza in Syria Palaestina, Roman Empire
- Died: AD 371; Province of Cyprus, Roman Empire
- Venerated in: Eastern Orthodox Church; Oriental Orthodox Churches; Roman Catholic Church
- Canonized: Pre-congregation
- Feast: October 21
- Attributes: Scroll, monastic habit

Hilarion (c. 291 – 371), also known by the bynames of Thavata, of Gaza and, in the Orthodox Church, as the Great, was a Christian anchorite who spent most of his life in the desert according to the example of Anthony the Great (c. 251–356). While Anthony is considered to have established Christian monasticism in the Egyptian Desert, Hilarion, who lived in the coastal area near Gaza, is considered by his biographer Jerome (c. 342/347 – 420), to be the founder of Palestinian monasticism – regarding this claim see also Hilarion's contemporary, Chariton (mid-3rd century – c. 350), founder of monasticism in the Judaean Desert. Hilarion is venerated as a saint exemplifying monastic virtues by the Eastern Orthodox Church, Oriental Orthodox Churches and the Roman Catholic Church.

== Biography ==
=== Origin and life as a hermit ===
Hilarion was born around 291 to pagan parents in Tabatha, a village five miles south of Gaza. Hilarion was at least bilingual, speaking both Greek as well as Aramaic, which was common around Gaza. His pagan parents sent him in his youth to study with a grammarian in Alexandria, where he gave, according to Jerome, a remarkable proof of his ability and character and became an accomplished speaker. While in Alexandria, he heard of the hermit Anthony and set off to study with him. After two months of learning the ascetic life from Anthony, Hilarion started to feel that the many visitors who came to Anthony for healing or exorcism were too much to bear and he decided to set off in the wilderness of Palestine to live alone as a hermit.

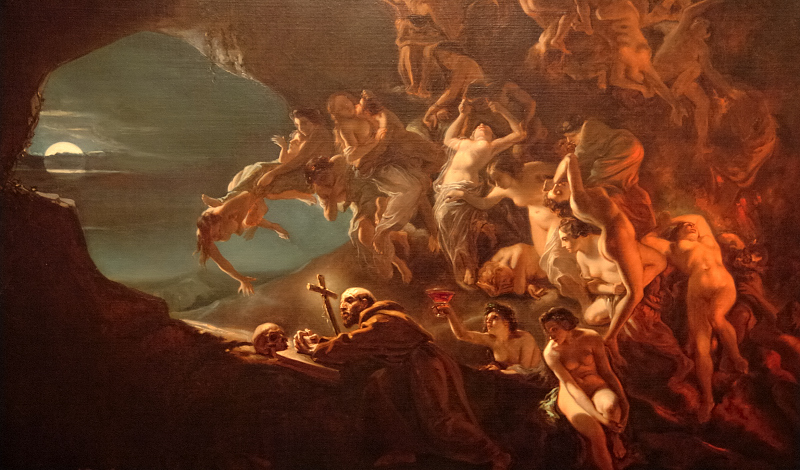
"The Temptation of Saint Hilarion", by Octave Tassaert, c. 1857 (Montreal Museum of Fine Arts)

Hilaron returned to Gaza, where he found his parents dead and subsequently gave away his goods to his brothers and the poor. He then established himself as a hermit in the desert inland from the coastal road, seven miles (11 km) from Maiuma, the port of Gaza. Though he went on one occasion to Jerusalem to venerate the holy sites, he chose not to live in the Judaean Desert as he did not wish to appear to confine God within prescribed limits, believing he could be close to God anywhere. Around 308, he built a hut where he lived in solitude for 22 years and which survived into the time of Jerome. Hilarion wove baskets as he had learned in Egypt where this was a common monastic occupation. Here he also struggled against fleshly desires and Jerome said that the devil tempted Hilarion by igniting the "flames of lust" in the young man. Hilarion fought this sexual desire by mortifying his body with hunger, thirst and strenuous labour.

=== Life in Gaza and attributed miracles ===
After the 22 years he lived in his solitary hut, Hilarion was approached by a brave woman who sought a cure for her sterility. First, he resisted, but soon he prayed for her upon which she was healed. From then on, Hilarion spent his life surrounded by disciples and people in need of healing and exorcism. Jerome reports several episodes in which Hilarion heals people, drives out demons, foresees the future, performs miracles and speaks divinely inspired words of wisdom. In one instance, Hilarion was able to heal the three children of Helpidius, who would later become praetorian prefect In Bethelea, Hilarion healed miraculously a certain Alaphion, which led to the conversion of the prominent family of the historian Sozomen.

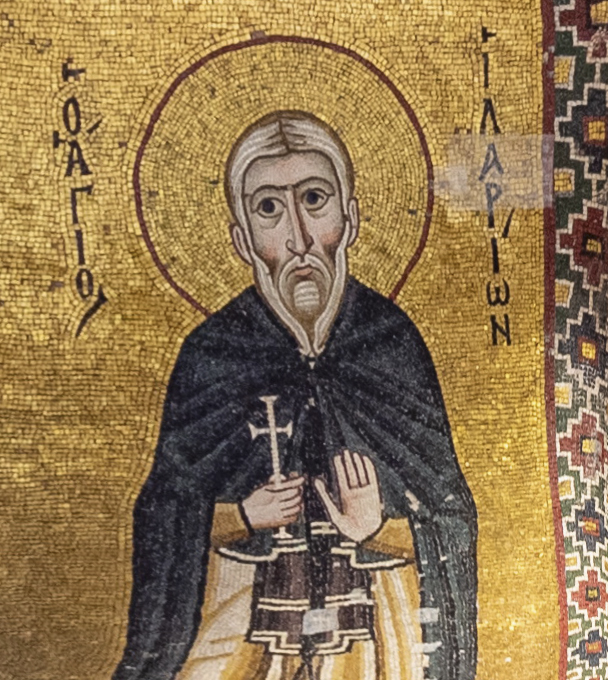
Saint Hilarion, 11th-century mosaic from Hosios Loukas

As there were no monasteries in Palestine or Syria at the time, people began to flock to Hilarion for spiritual training. Sozomen, possibly due to his local sources, singles out Epiphanius and Hesyach as the two most outstanding in the circle around Hilarion. Epiphanius, who is known by the bynames 'of Eleutheropolis' and 'of Salamis', became his disciple after returning from Egypt and would later go to Cyprus where he introduced monasticism and was elected bishop of Salamis around 367/368. With many more people seeking his guidance, Hilarion established a monastery during the reign of emperor Constantius (337–361) which, by the time he was sixty-three, consisted of a large community with many visitors.

=== Final years and death ===
Hilarion remained in Gaza until three years after the death of Anthony (around 356), upon which he went to the place where Anthony had died in Egypt in order to escape the crowds that visited him. While he was there, the pagan Julian became emperor of the East in the winter of 361/362 and the city authority of Gaza attempted to arrest Hilarion who then had to flee. Jerome's and Sozomen's account differs slightly as Jerome writes that Hilarion escaped arrest in Egypt and lived there until Julian's death before travelling to Sicily, Hilarion went according to Sozomen directly to Sicily. From there, he went soon to Epidauros in Dalmatia where he was said to have stilled the sea during the tsunami of 21 July 365 by drawing three crosses in the sand. Immediately after that, he went to Cyprus.

Hilarion was welcomed in Cyprus by his old disciple Epiphanius who encouraged him to stay. He initially settled near Paphos but later retired to a more remote place twelve miles (19 km) away. Here, Hilarion died at the age of eighty and was buried. Ten months after Hilarion's death, his disciple Hesyach stole his body, which was perfectly preserved and smelled sweetly, and interred it in his own monastery at Maiuma.

== Veneration and relics ==
Sozomen reports that after Hilarion's body was interred at his monastery, the local population started to celebrate an annual festival at the place. His relics continued to be venerated and are also mentioned by the anonymous Piacenza Pilgrim around the year 570.

Hilarion was venerated from early time in both East and West as an example of monastic holiness. Bede included him in his martyrology and he appeared frequently in Pre-Conquest English monastic calendars before his feast was ousted by those of Ursula and Dunstan's ordination. Charlemagne is said to have brought the relics of Hilarion to Moissac Abbey from where they were transferred to the church of Duravel in 1065.

Hilarion is the patron saint of Caulonia, a southern Italian town in Calabria, under the name Sant'Ilario.

On icons, Hilarion is depicted as an old man with a brown, rush-like beard divided into three points and he holds sometimes a scroll which reads: "The tools of a monk are steadfastness, humility, and love according to God."

== Sources ==
Upon Hilarion's death, Epiphanius announced his death in a laudatory letter which served as primary source for both Jerome and Sozomenus, who wrote subsequent hagiographies about Hilarion. Jerome wrote his Life of Hilarion in Latin around 390 in the monastery of Paula in Bethlehem. Jerome's work was translated into Greek by contemporary writer Sophronius upon whose translation Jerome looked favourably. Jerome was inspired by reading the Life of Anthony which also served as a literary model with regard to its content and ecclesiastic function of the text. There are two major themes Jerome focuses on, one being Hilarion's search for a life of solitary prayer and contemplation and the other being Hilarion's role as successor to Anthony. Jerome's goal was not so much to write a historical exact account but rather a hagiographic composition focusing on the life and deeds of Hilarion. Though Jerome's historical accuracy has been occasionally questioned, there can be no doubt that Hilarion was a historical figure and that Gaza became during his time a center of monasticism.

Hilarion's life is mentioned in the third, fifth and sixth book of Sozomen's Ecclesiastical history, which was written in the 440s. Whereas in the third book no new information to Jerome's Life of Hilarion is added and is in parts less detailed, Sozomen adds new information in the fifth and sixth books, possibly thanks to his local sources and own family history. Sozomen's own origin and literary aims as a historian therefore result in a different historical sketch of Hilarion's life than that of Jerome.

Hilarion is also mentioned twice in the Sayings of the Desert Fathers.

== In literature ==
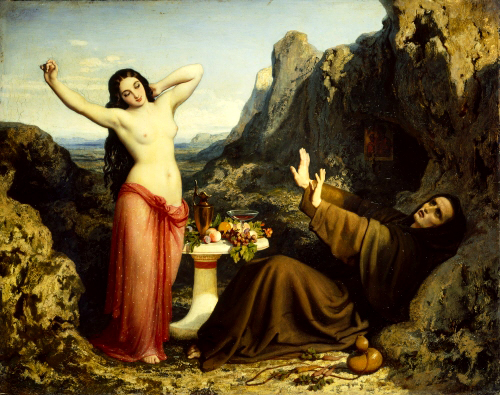
The Temptation of Saint Hilarion by Dominique Papety, 1844

Johann Gottfried Herder wrote the poem "The Paradise in the desert" about the teacher-disciple relation between Anthony and Hilarion in 1797. This motif was also taken up by Gustave Flaubert in his The Temptation of Saint Anthony, though changed, as Hilarion attempts to tempt Anthony away from his faith by creating doubt. Hermann Hesse adapted a biography of Hilarion as one of the three Lives of Joseph Knecht, making his Nobel Prize–winning novel The Glass Bead Game (also known as Magister Ludi).

== See also ==
- Chariton the Confessor (died c. 350), also considered to be the founder of Palestinian monasticism
- Euthymius the Great (377–473), founder of monasteries in Palestine and saint
  - Theoctistus (died 451), who together with Euthymius established and led the first coenobium (communal monastic settlement) in the Judaean desert (see also Theodosius)
- Paul of Thebes (c. 226/7–c. 341), known as "Paul, the First Hermit", who preceded both Anthony and Chariton
- Sabbas the Sanctified (439–532), monk and saint, founded several monasteries in Palestine
- Saint Hilarion Castle in Templos, Cyprus. Known in Turkish as "101 houses" (legends of Cyprus). Named for unconnected obscure saint.
- Saint Hilarion Monastery near Gaza
- Theodosius the Cenobiarch (c. 423–529), a founder of cenobitic monastic life in the Judaean desert (see also Theoctistus)

== Bibliography ==
- Barnes, Timothy David (2010). Early Christian Hagiography and Roman History. Mohr Siebeck. ISBN 978-3-16-150226-2.
- Binns, John (1994). Ascetics and Ambassadors of Christ: The Monasteries of Palestine, 314-631. Clarendon Press. ISBN 978-0-19-826465-1.
- Bitton-Ashkelony, Brouri; Kofsky, Aryeh (February 2006). The Monastic School of Gaza. Brill. pp. 36–43. ISBN 9789047408444.
