= Caroline Unger =

Austrian opera singer

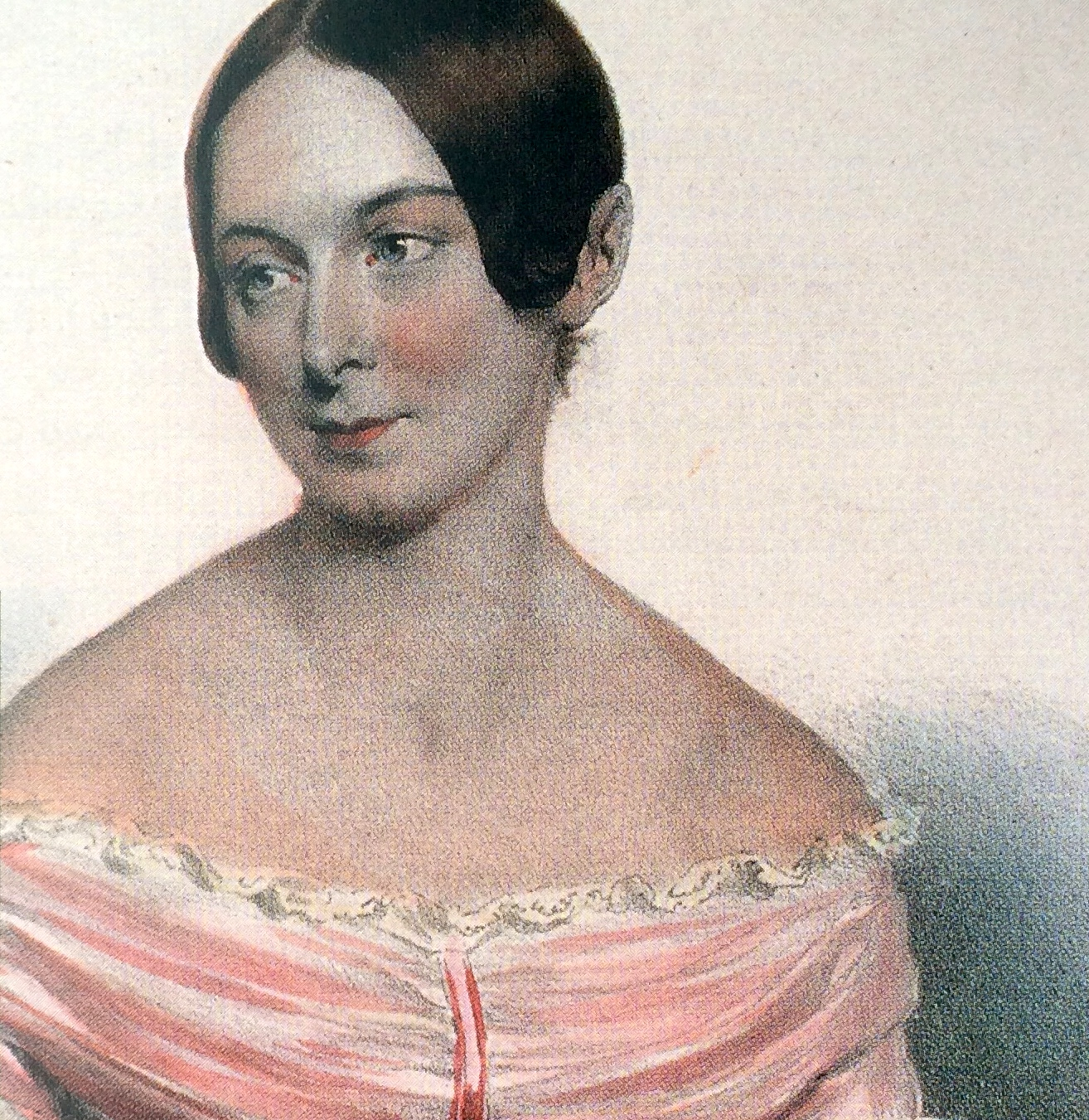
Caroline Unger

Caroline Unger (sometimes Ungher; 28 October 1803 – 23 March 1877), alternatively known as Karoline, Carolina, and Carlotta, was an Austro-Hungarian contralto.

== Biography ==
Born in Vienna (according to erroneous sources, in Stuhlweißenburg, today Székesfehérvár) she studied in Italy; among her teachers were Aloysia Weber Lange and Domenico Ronconi. Her stage debut, in her native city, came in 1821, when she performed in Mozart's Così fan tutte, a performance for which Franz Schubert had briefly served as her répétiteur. Three years later she sang in the first performances of Ludwig van Beethoven's Ninth Symphony and Missa solemnis.

She performed a great deal in Italy, principally in Naples after 1825 when she became engaged to the impresario of the Teatro di San Carlo, Domenico Barbaia. Among the roles written for her were those of Isoletta in Vincenzo Bellini's La straniera (1829, Milan), Gaetano Donizetti's Parisina (1833, Florence), Antonina in Belisario (1836, Venice), Maria de Rudenz (1838, Venice), and Bianca in Saverio Mercadante's Le due illustre rivali (1838, Venice).

Unger had a great success at the Théâtre-Italien in Paris in October 1833, where Sadie speculates that this was the occasion upon which Rossini is known to have commented on her voice as having "the ardour of the south, the energy of the north, brazen lungs, a silver voice and a golden talent".

In 1835, she had a passionate love affair with the French writer Alexandre Dumas during the boat trip they made together from Naples to Palermo, where the singer had been engaged for the autumn season at the Teatro Massimo.

In 1841 she married the French writer François Sabatier-Ungher and retired from the stage in 1843. She died in Florence and was buried in the cemetery of the basilica San Miniato al Monte there.

She is memorable for her part in the famous anecdote regarding the applause at the premiere of Beethoven's Ninth Symphony, at which she sang the contralto solo part – it was reported she turned the deaf composer around to receive his audience's thunderous applause.
