= Le concert champêtre =

Painting by Jean-Baptiste-Camille Corot

- Woodland Music-makers (English)
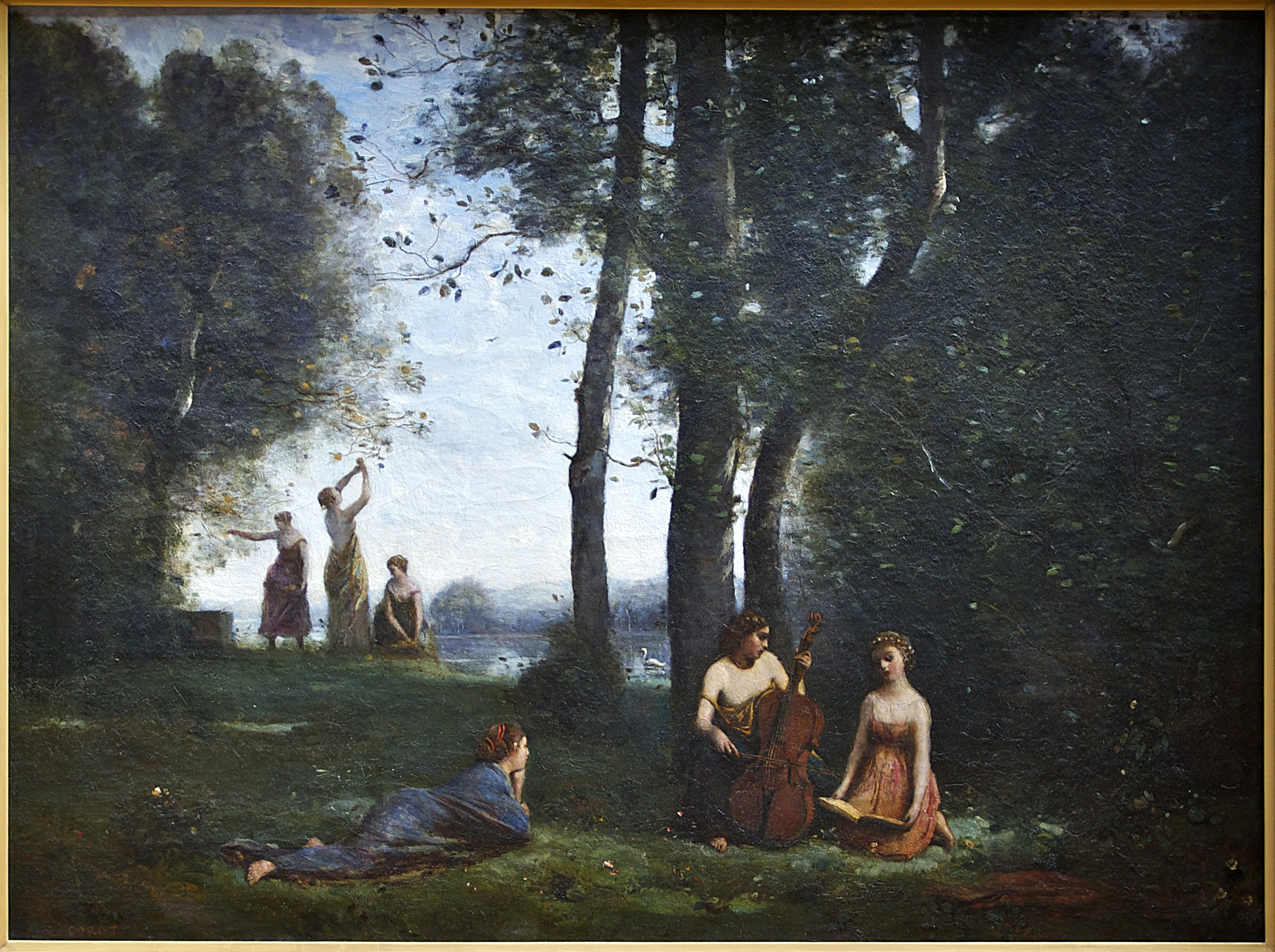
- Artist: Jean-Baptiste-Camille Corot
- Year: 1857
- Medium: oil on canvas
- Dimensions: 98 cm × 130 cm (39 in × 51 in)
- Location: Musée Condé; Chantilly
- Owner: Institut de France

Le Concert Champêtre (English: Woodland Music-makers) is an 1857 oil-on-canvas painting by French artist Jean-Baptiste-Camille Corot, now in the Musée Condé of Chantilly, France. A reworking of a composition exhibited by Corot in the Salon of 1844, the painting was shown in the Salon of 1857.

The painting depicts three women, one with a cello, in the foreground of a forest landscape.

== Sources ==
- Garnier-Pelle, Nicole (1997). Chantilly, musée Condé, Peintures des XIXème et XXème siècles (in French). Paris: RMN. pp. 90–92.
