= François Sabatier-Ungher =

French writer (1818–1891)

François Sabatier-Ungher; sketch by Gustave Courbet (1854)

Marie Jean Baptiste François Sabatier (2 July 1818 - 1 December 1891) was a French philanthropist, art critic, and translator. He changed his name to Sabatier-Ungher after his marriage to the Austro-Hungarian opera singer, Caroline Ungher.

== Biography ==
Marie Jean Baptiste François Sabatier was born and raised in Montpellier, France. His father was a wealthy landowner from Languedoc, who died just before his birth, so he was raised by an uncle, the Abbé Roques. Not long after beginning his studies at a Jesuit college, he declared his intention to become a writer and poet, running away to Paris to pursue that goal. He arrived there in 1833 and found encouragement from Alfred de Vigny. He also made acquaintances in the art world, including Auguste Bouquet and Edmond Wagrez (1815-1882), both of whom would accompany him to Rome in 1838. While there, he befriended several more French artists who were residing at the Villa Medici, notably Dominique Papety, and was introduced to the philosophy of Charles Fourier.

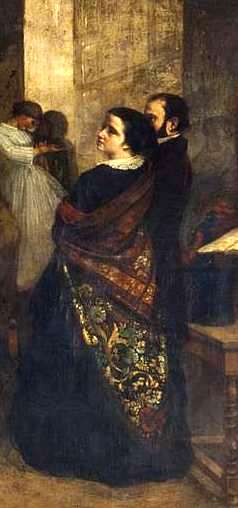
Détail from The Painter's Studio

During this trip, he met the Austrian opera singer, Caroline Ungher, who was famous for helping Beethoven acknowledge the applause at the premiere of his Ninth Symphony. They were married in 1841, in Florence. After a honeymoon, travelling through Germany, they returned to Florence and settled there. His artist friends pitched in to help them decorate their new apartment.

In 1846, Sabatier and Papety embarked on a study trip to Greece, but Sabatier returned upon hearing the news that his friend, Bouquet, was dying. He and Caroline adopted Bouquet's daughter, Louise, who would later marry the Italian historian, Michele Amari.

The French Revolution of 1848, with its promise of establishing a government based on Fourier's principles, drew him back to France. In 1851, he wrote a review of that year's Salon; welcoming the rise of Realism and, in particular, the works of Gustave Courbet. Shortly after, he would become one of Courbet's patrons and, later, his friend.

Following the Coup d'état of 1851, he retired to his estate, Le Tour de Farges, near Lunel-Viel, welcoming Courbet there in 1854. The following year, while living in Ornans, Courbet would create his large canvas, The Painter's Studio which depicts the artist Apollonie Sabatier (no relation) next to a man who is usually identified as her lover, Alfred Mosselman, but may be François. In 1857, Courbet returned for a lengthy visit to Le Tour, creating several landscapes there. In addition to notables from the art world, several political figures were also his guests, including the German revolutionary, Moritz Hartmann.

After Caroline's death in 1877, he remarried to Catherine Boll, about whom little is known. His will left his writings to the Musée Fabre and his art collection to the Louvre. He also made a large donation to a retirement home in Neuilly-sur-Seine, where one of his old friends, the sculptor Auguste Ottin, was a resident.

Among the works he translated from German are Die Grabmäler der Römischen Päpste by Ferdinand Gregorovius, Wilhelm Tell by Friedrich von Schiller and Faust by Goethe.

Sabatier-Ungher died on 1 December 1981, near Lunel-Viel.

== Sources ==
- Michel Hilaire, "L'Autre rencontre: François Sabatier et l'art phalanstérien", in: Noël Barbe and Hervé Touboul, Courbet / Proud'hon: L'Art et le peuple, éditions du Sekoya, 2010, pgs. 50-61, ISBN 978-2-84751-078-2 Online
- Documents and photographs @ the Website of the Domaine de la Tour de Farges
- Otto Hartwig, "François Sabatier und Caroline Sabatier-Unger", in: Deutsche Rundschau, Vol. 91 (1897), pgs. 227–243
- Fanny Lewald, "Caroline Ungher-Sabatier", in: Zwölf Bilder nach dem Leben. Erinnerungen, Berlin 1888, pgs. 75–93
