= Ilona Hegedűs =

Hungarian writer

Ilona Hegedűs is a Hungarian writer of science fiction, fantasy and horror poetry, writing in English, who has written Unearthly Companion (2005), a book of speculative poetry with poems nominated for Muses Prize and James B. Baker Award. She was the editor of the European Reader magazine (2006–2010). She is also well known as a book reviewer. Some of her poems have been published in the US, UK, France, Greece and Hungary.

== See also ==
- Hegedűs
- Ilona
