= Arabs Travelling in the Desert =

Painting by Horace Vernet

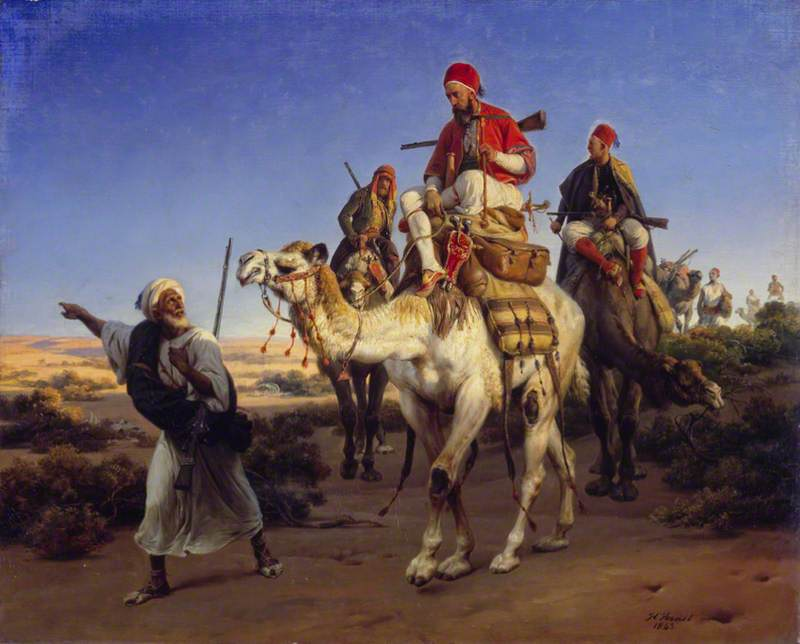
- Artist: Horace Vernet
- Year: 1843
- Type: Oil on canvas, genre painting
- Dimensions: 46.7 cm × 57.7 cm (18.4 in × 22.7 in)
- Location: Wallace Collection; London

Arabs Travelling in the Desert is an 1843 genre painting by the French artist Horace Vernet. It depicts a group of travellers crossing the desert on camel. Stylistically it reflects the fashionable Orientalism of the era. Vernet had begun his career in the Napoleonic era, but continued his success through multiple changes in France's government becoming particularly known for his battle paintings.

Vernet had travelled extensively in French Algeria. The title may be a misonmer, as it likely depicts Vernet and his cousin Charles Burton and nephew Frédéric Goupil-Fesquet. The picture was likely painted from memory while on a trip to the Russian Empire.

The painting was displayed at the Salon of 1844 at the Louvre in Paris. Today it is in the Wallace Collection in London, having been purchased by Marquess of Hertford.

== Bibliography ==
- Ben-Arieh, Yehoshua Painting the Holy Land in the Nineteenth Century.University of Virginia, 1997.
- Ingamells, John. The Wallace Collection: French Nineteenth Century. Trustees of the Wallace, 1975.
- Netton, Ian Richard. Orientalism Revisited: Art, Land and Voyage Routledge, 2011.
