= The Temptation of Saint Hilarion =

Painting by Dominique Papety

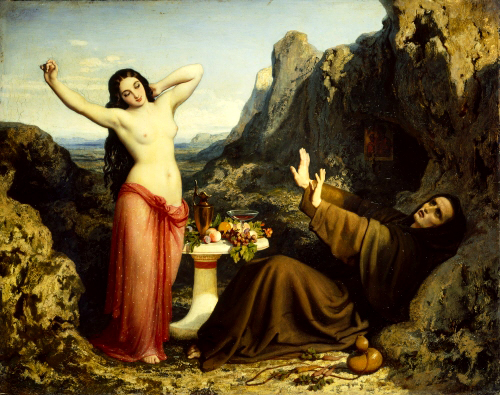
- Artist: Dominique Papety
- Year: 1843–1844
- Type: Oil on mahogany, history painting
- Dimensions: 50.5 cm × 64.6 cm (19.9 in × 25.4 in)
- Location: Wallace Collection; London

The Temptation of Saint Hilarion is an 1844 history painting by the French artist Dominique Papety. It depicts the Christian Saint Hilarion, a hermit who founded monasteries in Palestine but was forced to endure many temptations by the devil.

The painting was displayed at the Salon of 1844 at the Louvre in Paris. The Art Journal described it as "a small picture, but full of interest and beautiful details". It was acquired by the Marquess of Hertford in 1860 and is today in the Wallace Collection in London.

== Bibliography ==
- Potts, Malcolm & Short, Roger. Ever Since Adam and Eve: The Evolution of Human Sexuality. Cambridge University Press, 1999.
- Ryan, Marianne. La France, Images of Woman and Ideas of Nation, 1789-1989 . South Bank Centre, 1989.
