= The Love of Gold =

Painting by Thomas Couture

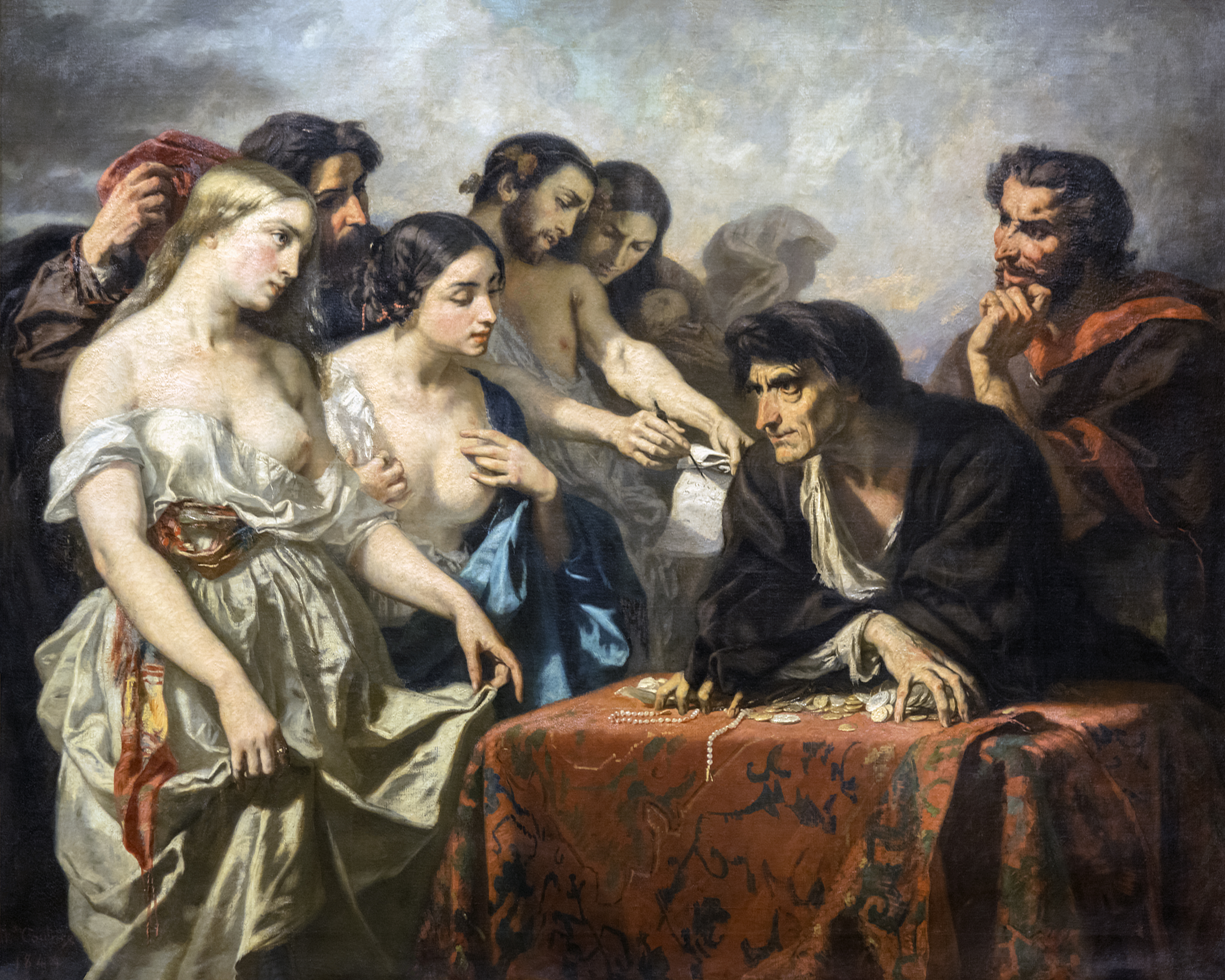
- Artist: Thomas Couture
- Year: 1844
- Type: Oil on canvas, allegorical painting
- Dimensions: 152 cm × 189.5 cm (60 in × 74.6 in)
- Location: Musée des Augustins; Toulouse

The Love of Gold (French: La soif de l'or) is an 1844 allegorical oil painting by the French artist Thomas Couture. Romantic in style, it depicts the effects of greed and the moral corruption that follows. Three years later Couture would have his greatest success with The Romans in their Decadence, which dwelt on similar themes. The painting was displayed at the Salon of 1844 at the Louvre in Paris. Today it is part of the collection of the Musée des Augustins in Toulouse, having been acquired in 2004.

== Bibliography ==
- Boime, Albert. Art in an Age of Counterrevolution, 1815-1848. University of Chicago Press, 2004.
- Raineau, Joëlle . Balzac et l'italie: lectures croisées. Paris-Musées, 2003.
