= Self-Portrait with a Black Dog =

Painting by Gustave Courbet

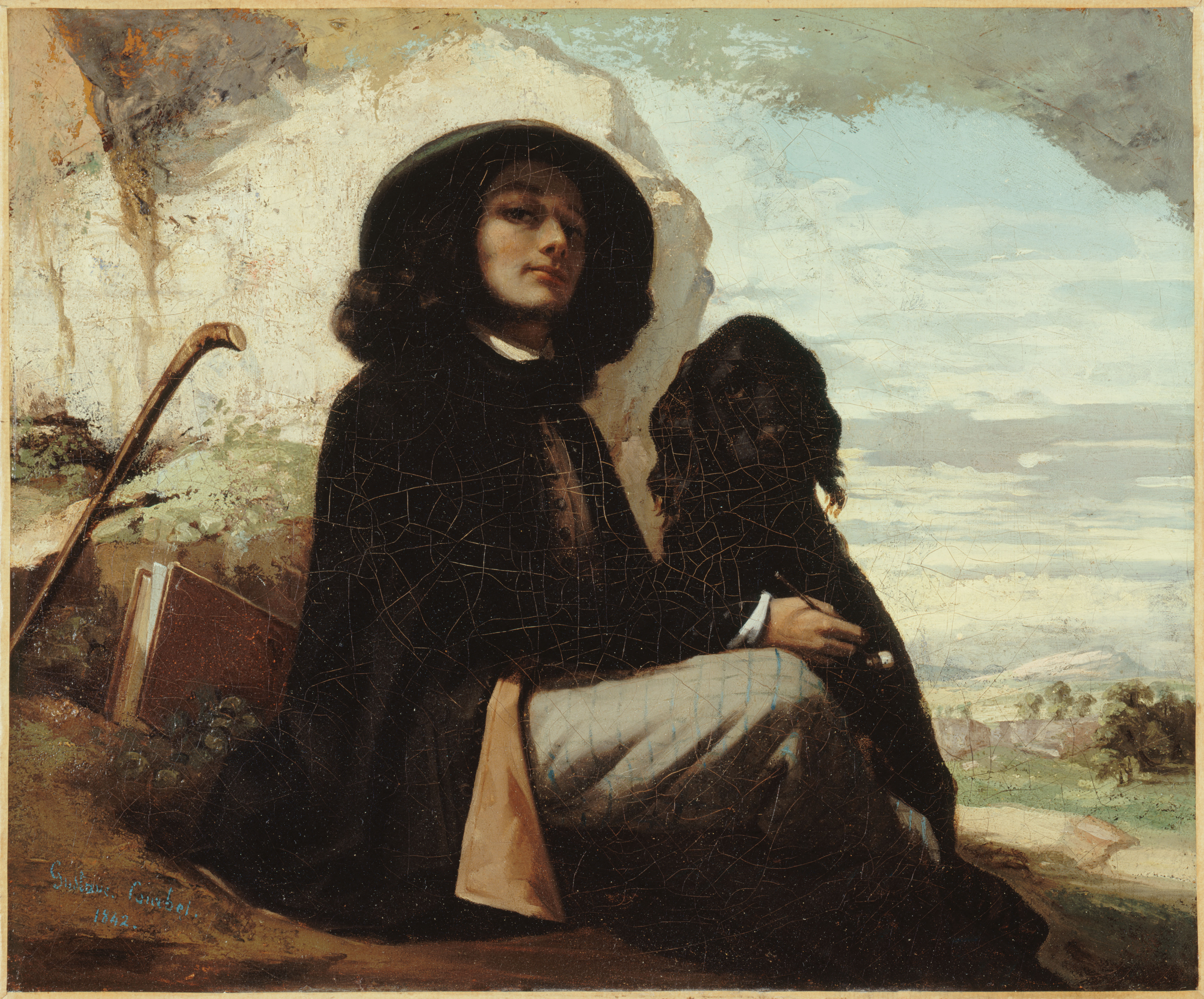
- Artist: Gustave Courbet
- Year: 1842-1844
- Medium: Oil on canvas
- Dimensions: 46.3 cm × 55.5 cm (18.2 in × 21.9 in)
- Location: Petit Palais, Paris

Self-Portrait with a Black Dog, Portrait of the Artist or Courbet with a Black Dog (French: Courbet au chien noir) is an 1842 oil-on-canvas painting by the French artist Gustave Courbet, retouched by the artist in 1844. It is now in the Petit Palais in Paris.

== History ==
This painting was one of the first by Courbet to be accepted at the Paris Salon. In the official catalog of the exhibition, opened in March 1844 at the Louvre Palace, it appears under number 414, with the title Portrait of the Author. Of the three paintings that he submitted, only this one was accepted.

Analysis of the canvas reveals that it is the result of a re-use. Thus, we see on the contours the traces of a coat hanger, so as to present the painting in a rounded form. It is assumed that this painting was presented to the Salon public in the slightly rounded form. The artist is seen di sotto, involving a sunken viewer, suggesting that the painting may have been intended for an overdoor.

== Description ==
A young man, Courbet himself, wearing a hat sits on the ground, flanked by a black dog. The character, leaning against a large rock, looks at the viewer while holding a pipe. Behind him a book and a cane are placed among the grass. In the distance are a landscape, a valley, trees and hills, overlooked by blue and cloudy skies. On the left are inscribed in blue the signature "Gustave Courbet" and a date, "1842".

== Analysis ==
Courbet presents himself in the fashion of the time, with his bohemianism symbolized by his black cape hemmed in light, striped trousers, and long hair, in a landscape of his native land, which was assumed to be the Bonnevaux valley, but which is undoubtedly partly imaginary. By settling in the open air, he follows the process of the English portrait painters of the 18th century, which was in vogue during the Romantic era.

The style and the motif of the painting are noticeably inspired by Théodore Géricault, but also by the "serpentine line" of William Hogarth.
