= Portrait of Kristóf Hegedűs =

1844 painting by József Borsos

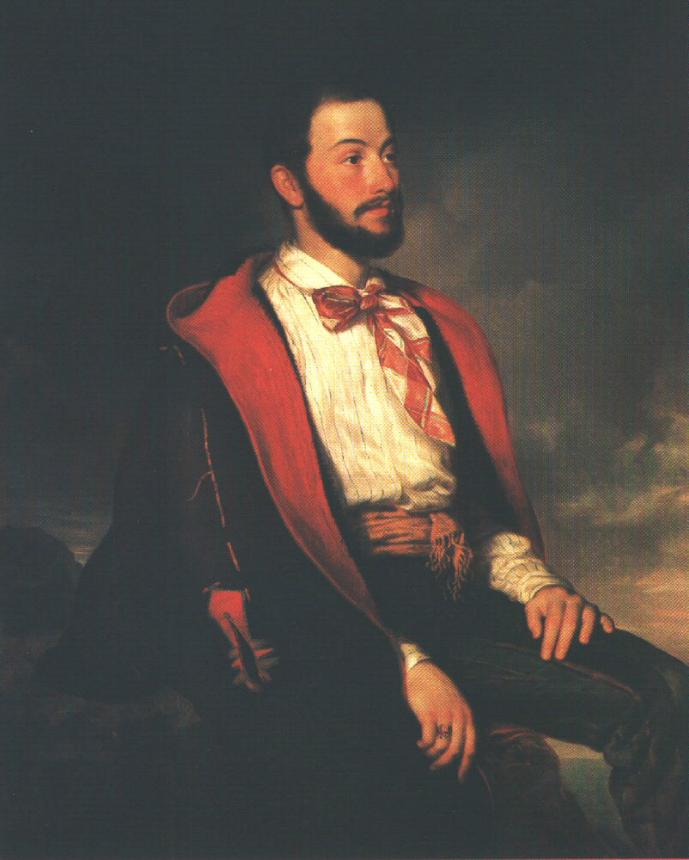
- Artist: József Borsos
- Year: 1844
- Dimensions: 126.5 cm × 82 cm (49.8 in × 32 in)
- Location: Hungarian National Museum; Budapest

The Portrait of Kristóf Hegedűs is an 1844 painting by Hungarian painter József Borsos. It was one of his earliest works.

The oil on canvas measures 126.5 x 82 cm and is currently on display at the Historical Picture Gallery section of the Hungarian National Museum, Budapest

== Sources ==
- Works by Jozef Borsos
