= Dominique Papety =

French painter

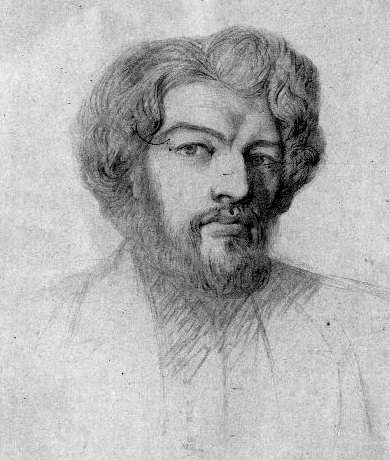
Dominique Papety, by Louis-Marie Normand, from L'Artiste, 15 June 1864

Dominique Louis Féréol Papety (12 August 1815 – 19 September 1849) was a French painter. He is best known for his canvases and drawings on Greek themes, both Classical and contemporary, and is considered an early member of the Néo-Grec movement.

== Biography ==
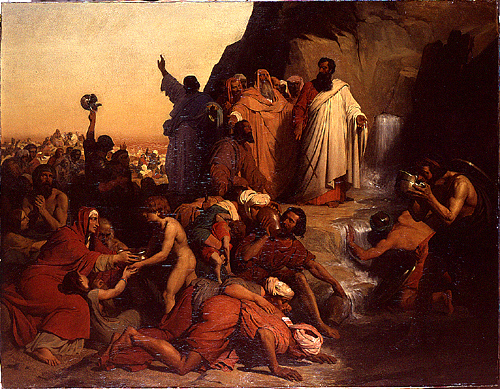
Moses Striking Water from a Stone, 1836

He was born in Marseille. His father was a soap maker. After displaying some talent for drawing, Papety took lessons from Augustin Aubert. In 1835, he enrolled at the École des Beaux-arts in Paris, where he studied with Léon Cogniet. The following year, he and Charles Octave Blanchard shared first place for the Prix de Rome. Papety's entry depicted Moses striking water from a stone with his staff.

He spent the years from 1837 to 1842 at the Villa Medicis. One of his teachers, Ingres, said that "...he was already a master when he touched a brush". His first exhibition at the Salon was in 1843.

Papety became a close friend of François Sabatier-Ungher, an art critic who was interested in antiquities. Together, they took a trip to Greece in 1846. He visited all twenty-three monasteries on Mount Athos, made hundreds of drawings and, the following year, published a combination travelogue and report in the Revue des deux Mondes titled Les peintures byzantines et les couvents de l'Athos; influenced by the ideas of Charles Fourier. Those ideas also inspired his best known painting: Le Rêve du Bonheur (Dream of Happiness).

He took another trip to Greece, in 1847, and made sketches that were later used to decorate the Panthéon in Paris. In addition, he documented archaeological sites and made ethnographic studies of the local customs and costumes. Following a suggestion by the Duc de Montpensier, he created a scene commemorating the Royal Family's visit to Athens in 1845. When he returned to Marseille, he was ill with cholera. He appeared to improve, but occasional bouts of fever recurred and worsened during a stay in Camargue.

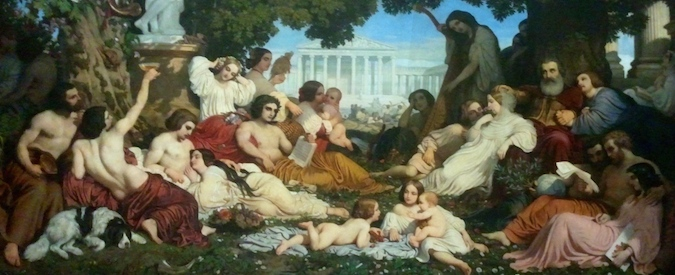
The Dream of Happiness (detail)

The disease ultimately proved to be fatal and he died in Marseille in 1849, aged only thirty-four. This was after the Second Cholera Pandemic had reached France, so his funeral was unattended. His remaining works were sold at an auction.

A large selection of Papety's works was shown in a major exhibition at the French School at Athens in 1946, celebrating the school's centennial. A street in Marseille has been named after him.

== Gallery ==
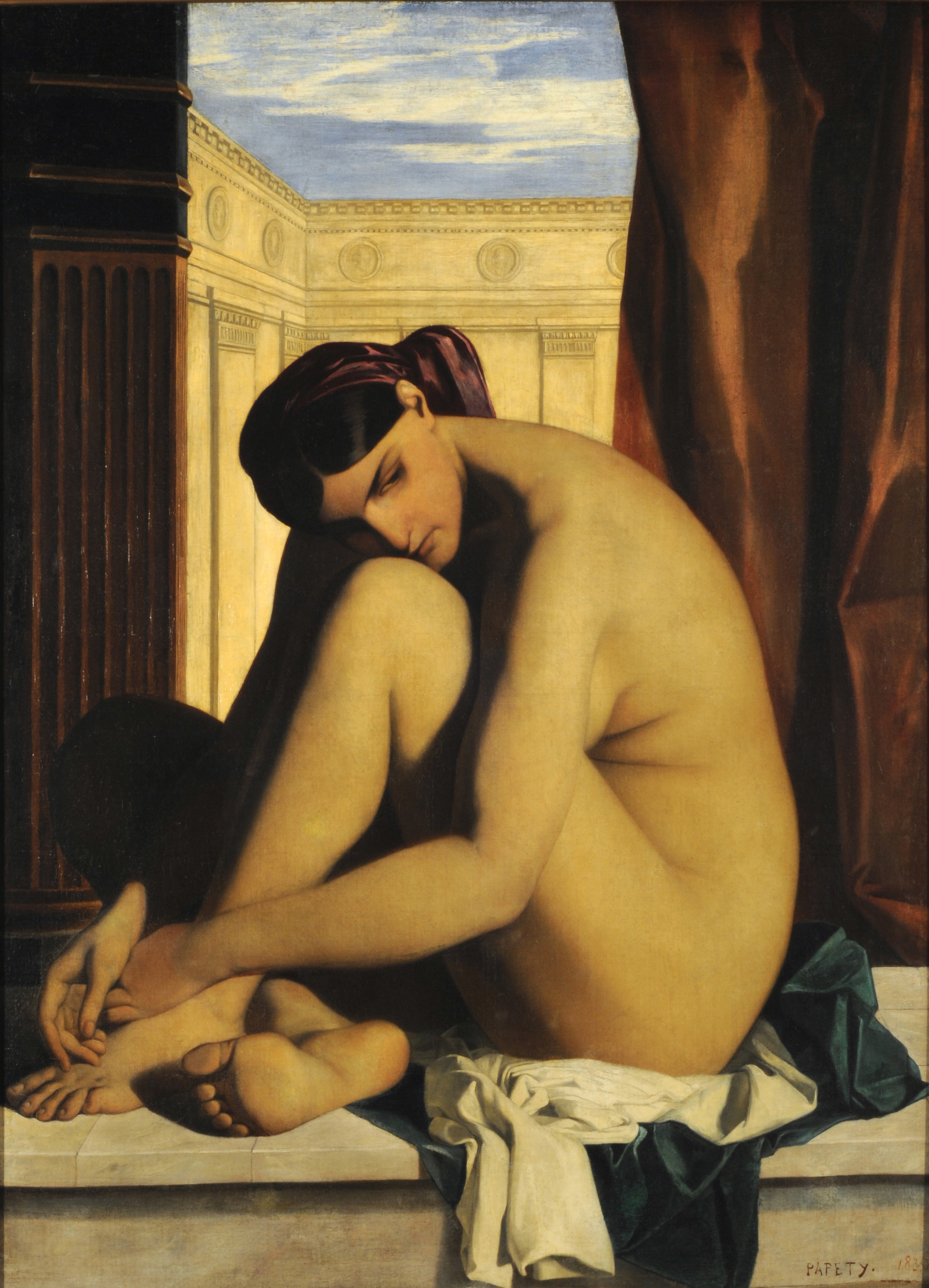
In the Bath, c 1835, Museo Nacional de Bellas Artes

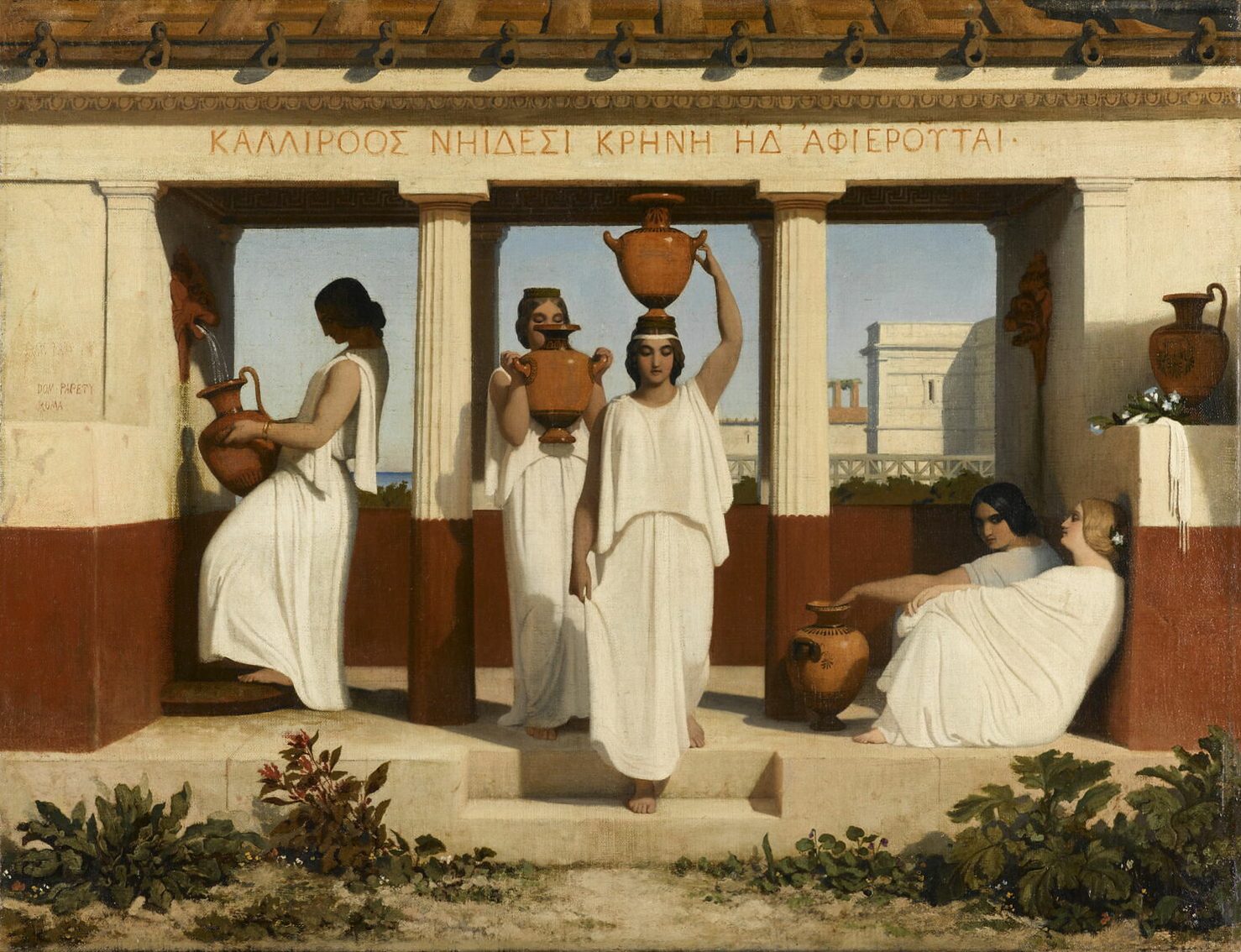
Greek Women at a Fountain, c 1841, Louvre Museum

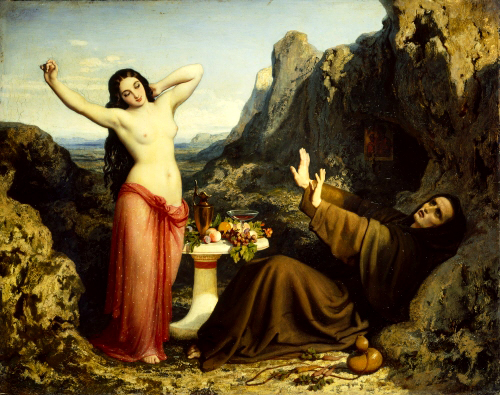
The Temptation of Saint Hilarion, 1844

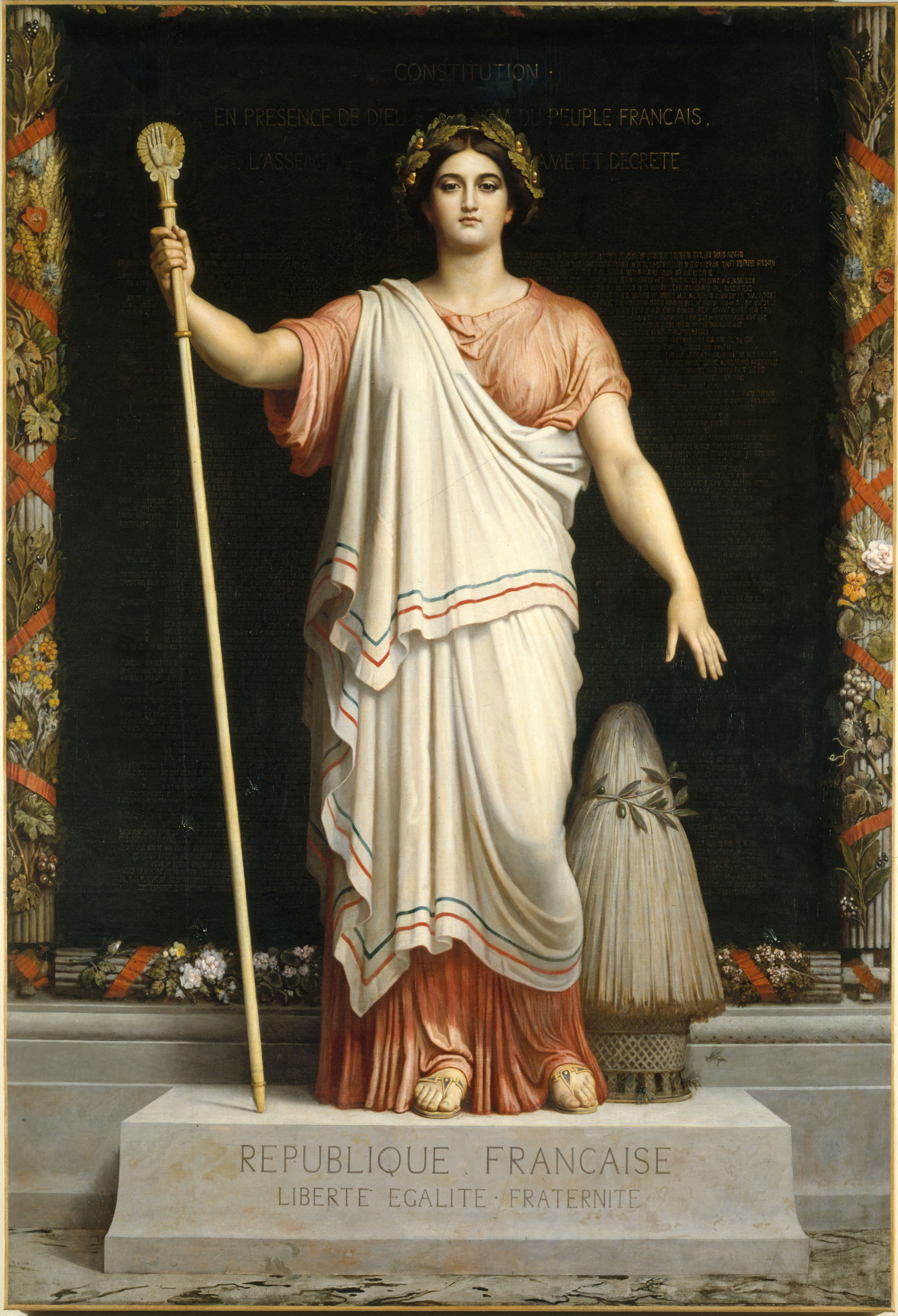
La République, c 1848, Musée des Beaux-Arts de la ville de Paris

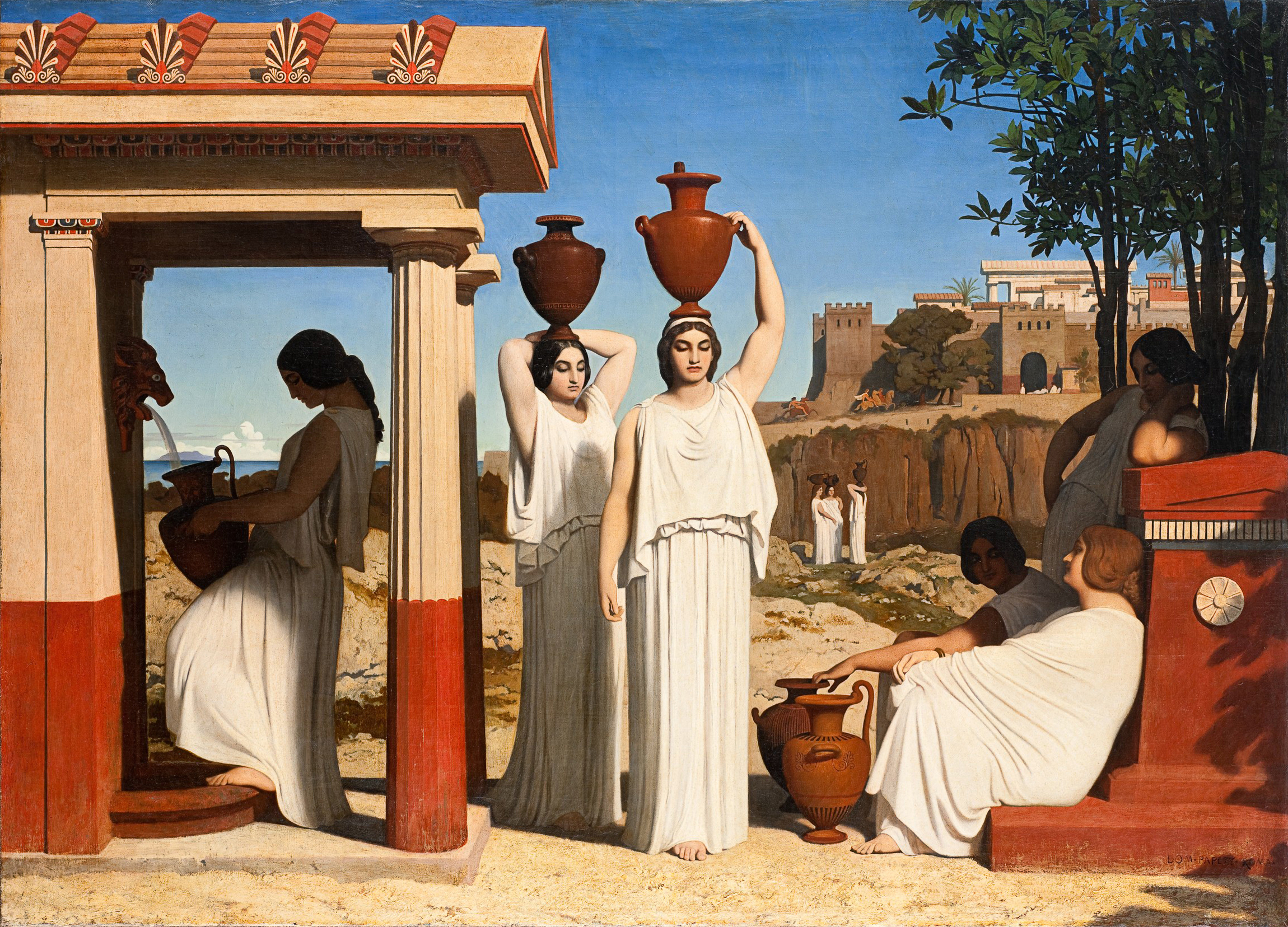
Femmes à la fontaine, c 1839–1840, Musée Fabre

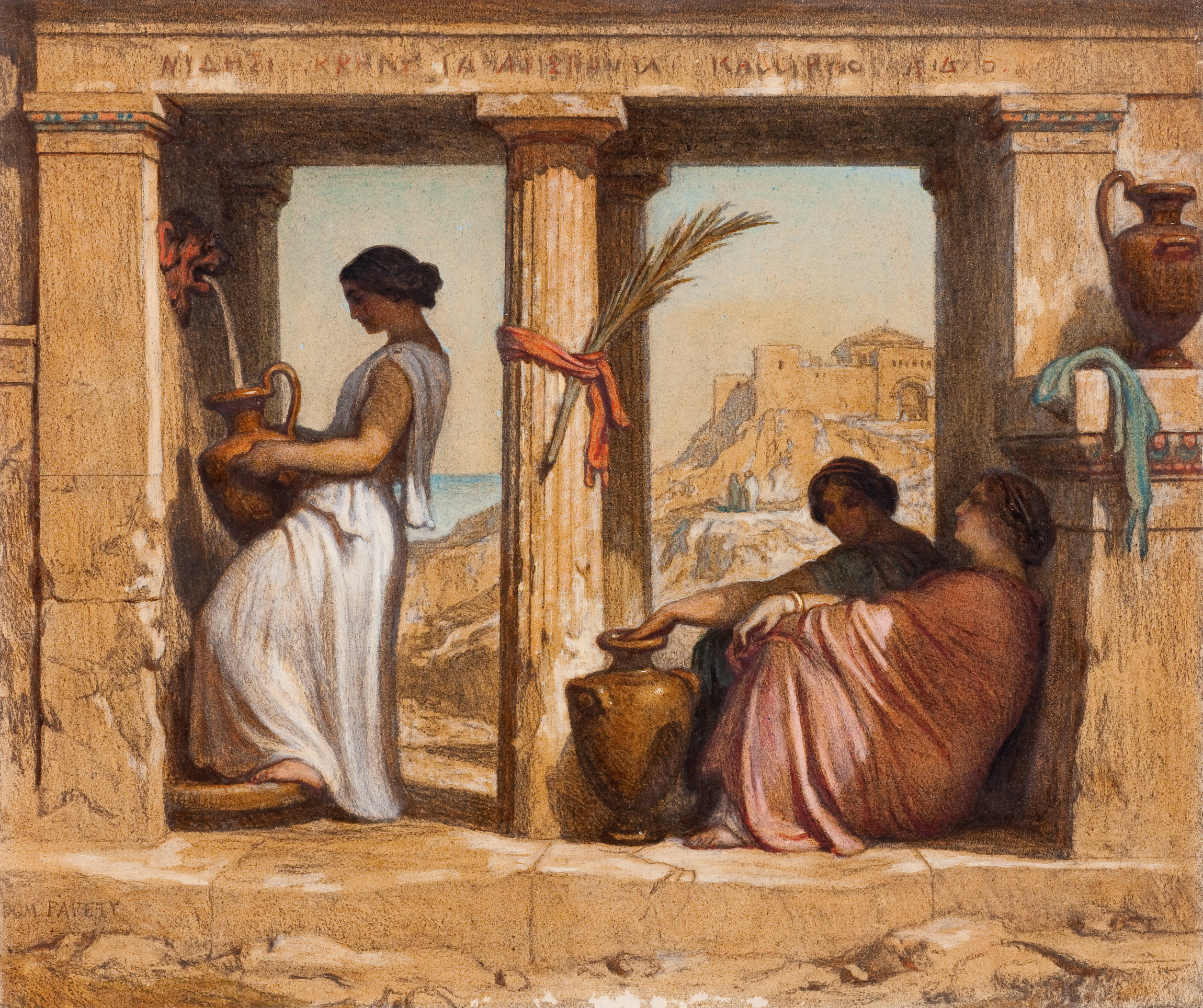
Femmes à la fontaine, c 1840–1841, Musée Fabre

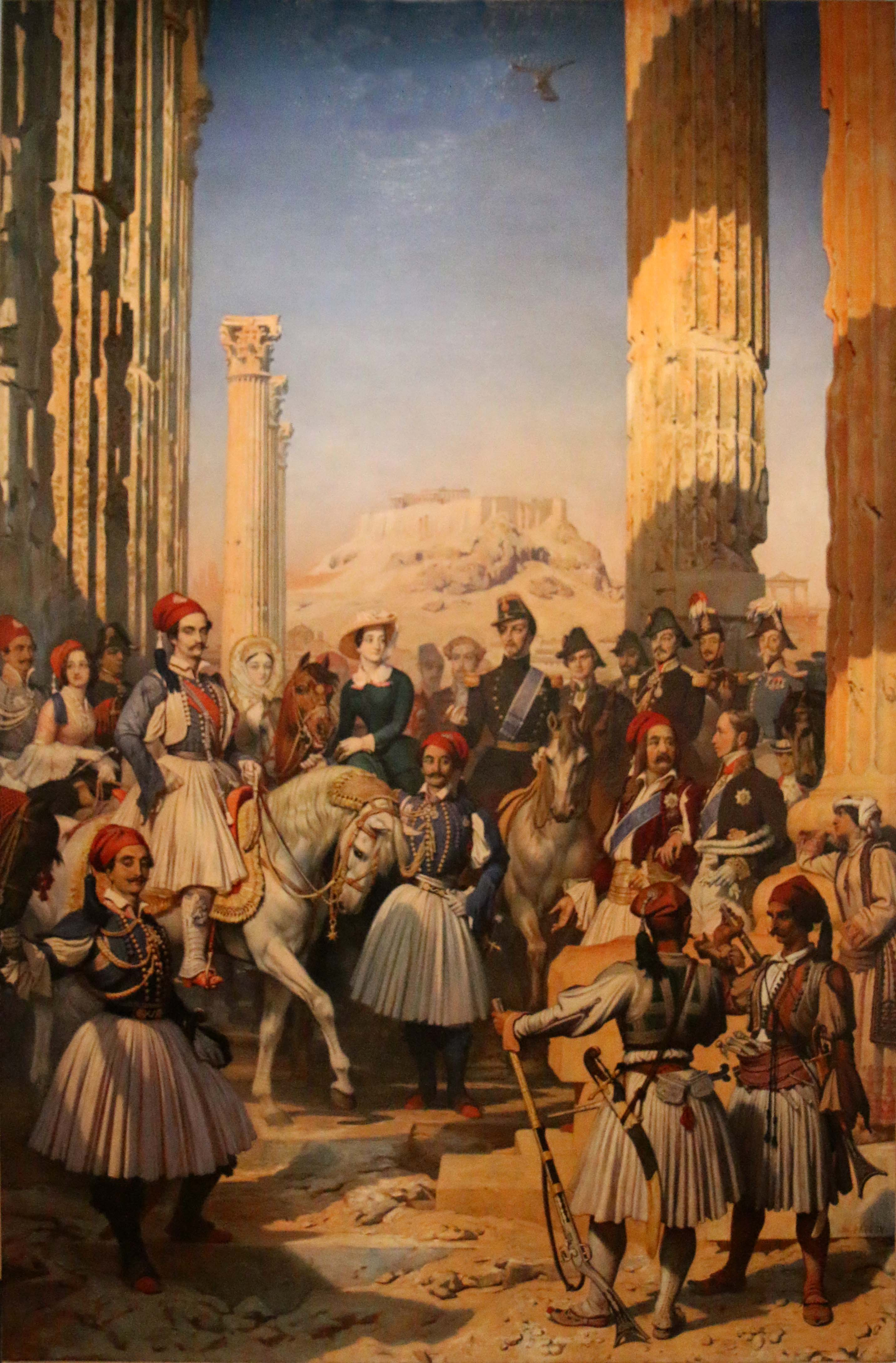
Le duc de Montpensier visitant les ruines du temple de Jupiter à Athènes, c 1848, Museum of European and Mediterranean Civilisations

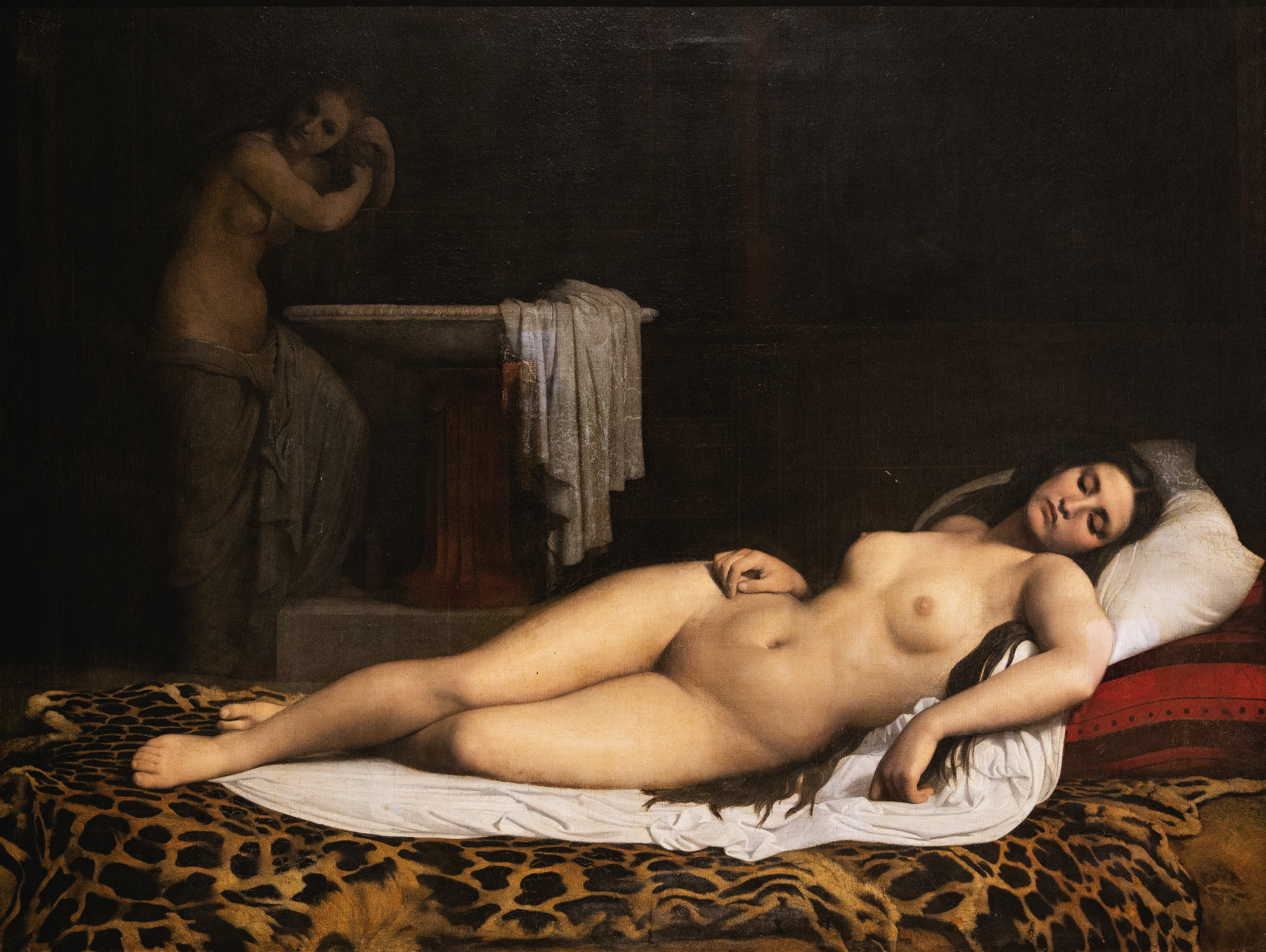
The Odalisque
