= Palpitation (painting) =

Painting by Charles West Cope

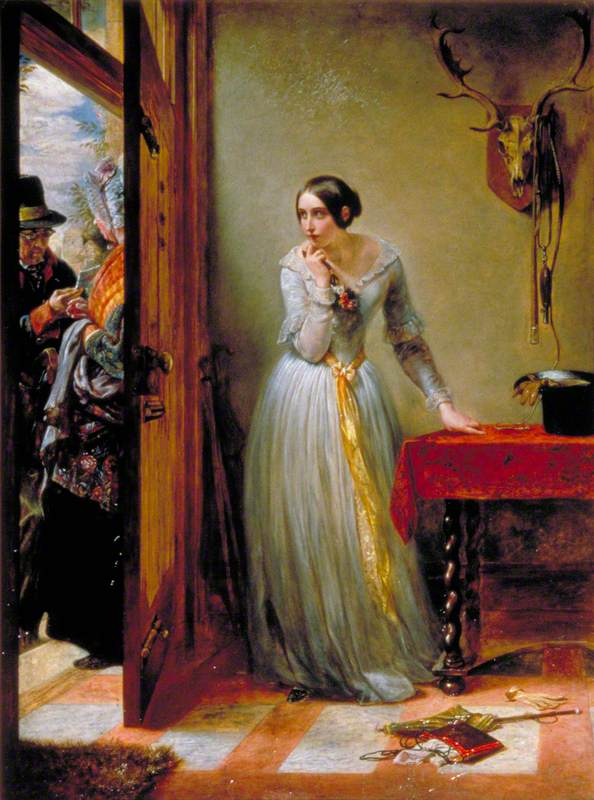
- Artist: Charles West Cope
- Year: 1844
- Type: Oil on panel, genre painting
- Dimensions: 76.2 cm × 57.8 cm (30.0 in × 22.8 in)
- Location: Victoria and Albert Museum, London

Palpitation is an 1844 genre painting by the British artist Charles West Cope. It depicts a fashionable young woman waiting in a state of or anxiety as the postman and a servant are gossiping on the doorstep. She is waiting for a letter, either from a suitor or a secret lover.

The painting was displayed at the Royal Academy Exhibition of 1844 held at London's National Gallery. It was acquired by the art collector John Sheepshanks, who included it in his large donation of paintings to the Victoria and Albert Museum in 1857.

== Bibliography ==
- Lambourne, Lionel. Victorian Painting. Phaidon, 1999.
- Roe, Sonia. Oil Paintings in Public Ownership in the Victoria and Albert Museum. Public Catalogue Foundation, 2008.
