= Ostend (painting) =

Painting by J. M. W. Turner

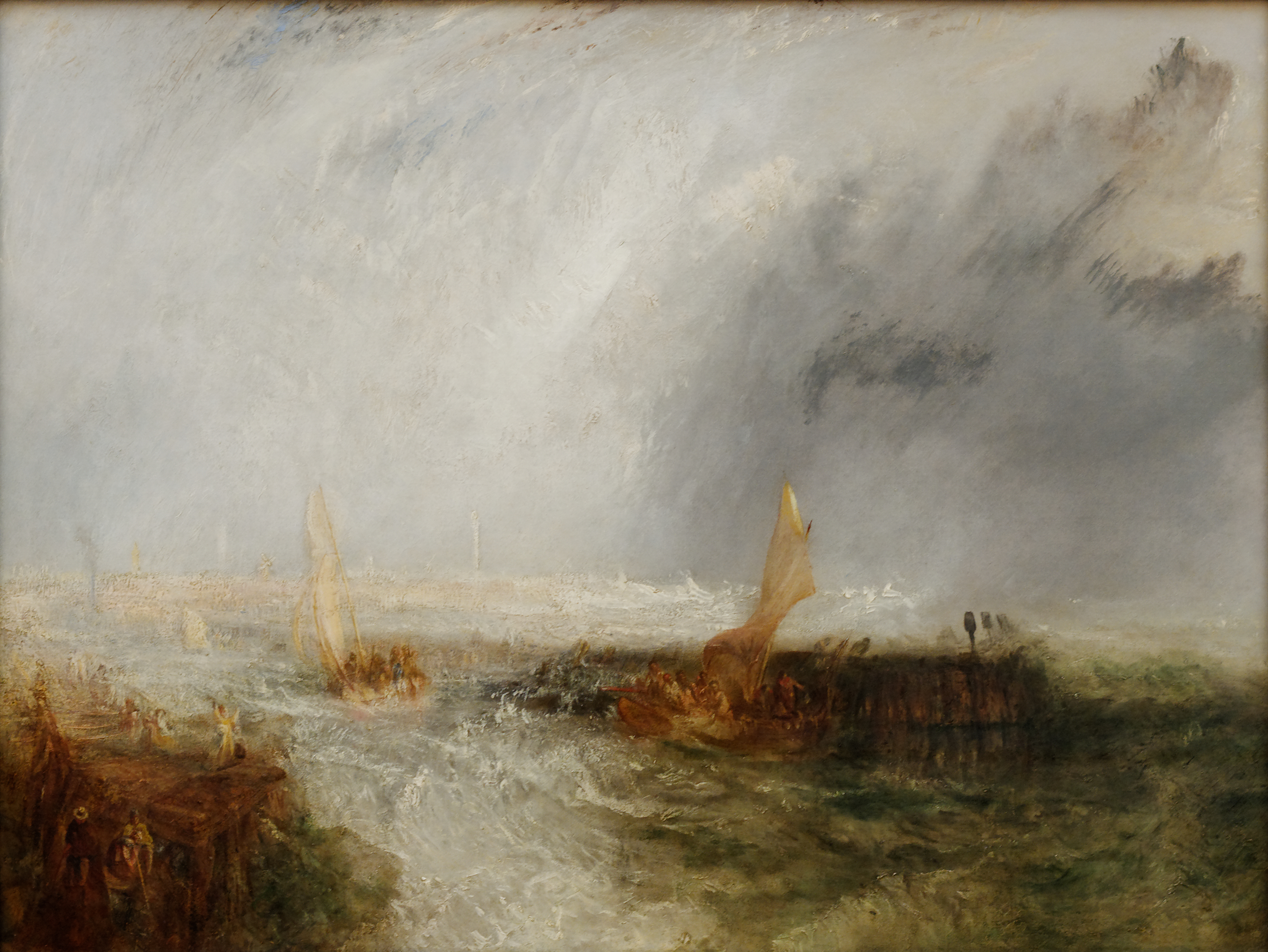
- Artist: J. M. W. Turner
- Year: 1844
- Type: Oil on canvas, landscape painting
- Dimensions: 91.6 cm × 122 cm (36.1 in × 48 in)
- Location: Neue Pinakothek, Munich

Ostend (German: Ostende) is an 1844 landscape painting by the British artist J.M.W. Turner. It depicts the port of Ostend in Belgium. The work was one of six displayed by Turner at the Royal Academy Exhibition of 1844 held at the National Gallery in London. Today the painting is part of the collection of the Neue Pinakothek of Munich in Bavaria.

== See also ==
- List of paintings by J. M. W. Turner

== Bibliography ==
- Bachrach, Fred G. Turner's Holland. Tate Gallery, 1994.
- Lenz, Christian. The Neue Pinakothek, Munich. Beck, 2007.
- Reynolds, Graham. Turner. Thames & Hudson, 2022.
- Solkin, David. Turner and the Masters. Harry N. Abrams, 2009.
