= Venice Quay, Ducal Palace =

Painting by J. M. W. Turner

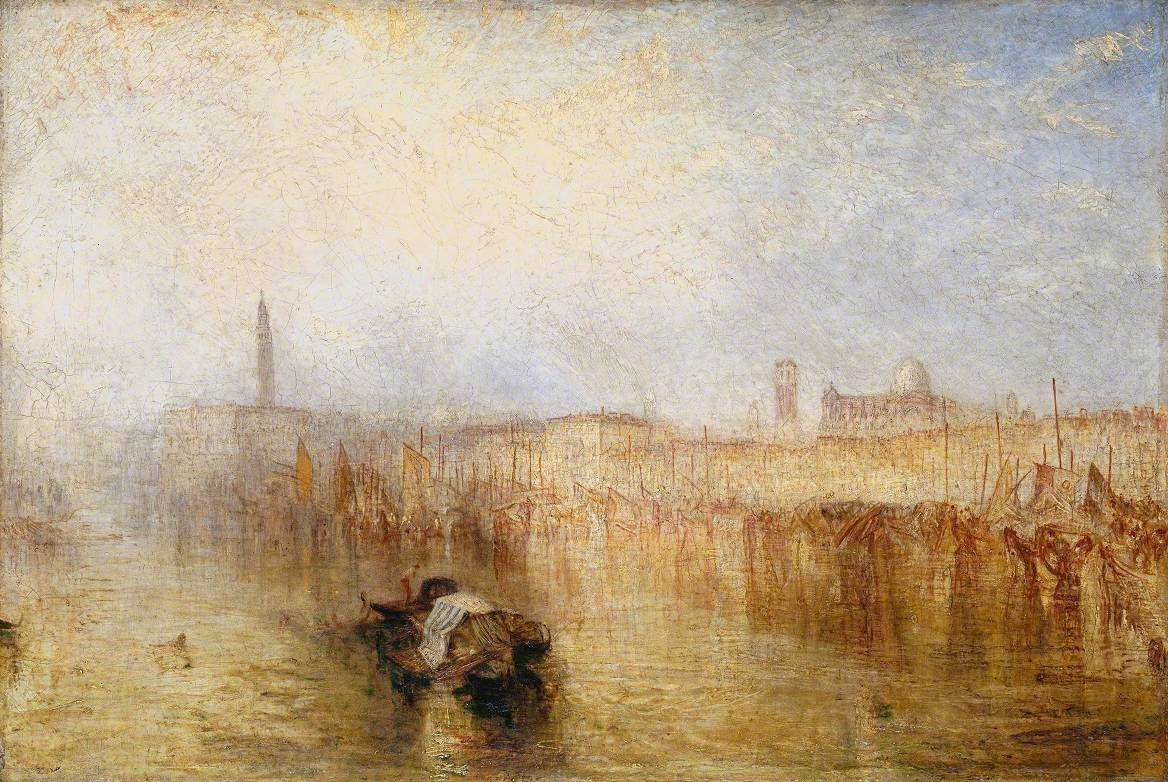
- Artist: J. M. W. Turner
- Year: 1844
- Type: Oil on canvas, landscape painting
- Dimensions: 62.2 cm × 92.7 cm (24.5 in × 36.5 in)
- Location: Tate Britain, London
- Website: tate.org.uk/...n00540

Venice Quay, Ducal Palace is an 1844 landscape painting by the British artist J.M.W. Turner. It depicts a view of the Riva degli Schiavoni, the main waterfront in Venice. On the left is the Doge’s Palace with St Mark's Campanile behind it. On the right iare the white dome and bell tower of San Zaccaria. The foreground is filled wth craft at the city's quay.

Turner turned to Venice as a subject later in his career, displaying a painting for the first time at the Royal Academy Exhibition of 1833, but then turned to it frequently in his work during the following decade.

This painting featured at the Royal Academy Exhibition of 1844 at the National Gallery. Part of the Turner Bequest of 1856, it is now in the collection of the Tate Britain.

== See also ==
- List of paintings by J. M. W. Turner

== Bibliography ==
- Finberg, Alexander Joseph. In Venice with Turner. Cotswold Gallery, 1930.
- Hamilton, James (ed.) Turner and Italy. National Galleries of Scotland, 2009.
- Reynolds, Graham. Turner. Thames & Hudson, 2022.
