= Approach to Venice =

Painting by J. M. W. Turner

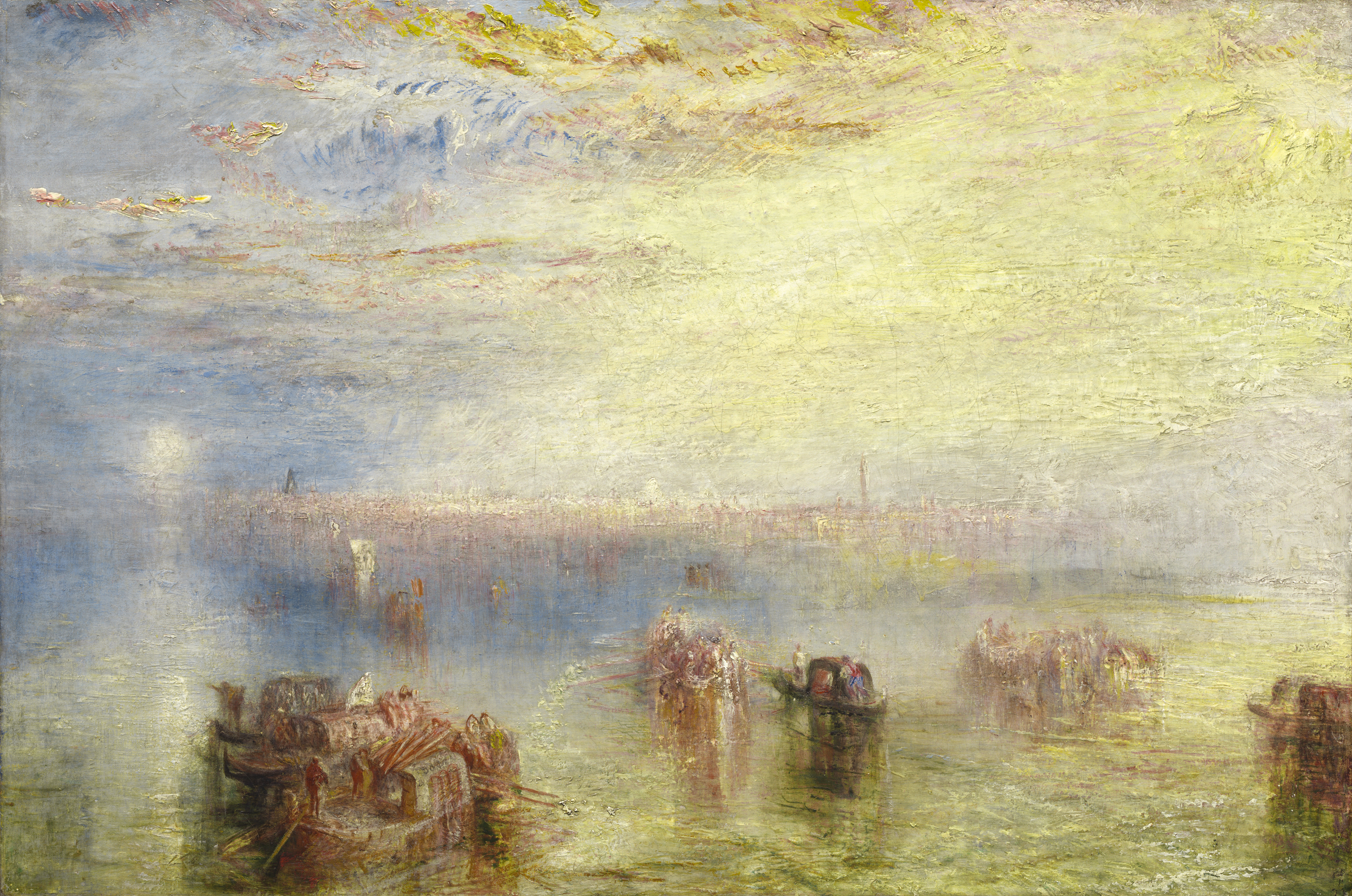
- Artist: J. M. W. Turner
- Year: 1844
- Type: Oil on canvas, landscape
- Dimensions: 62 cm × 94 cm (24 in × 37 in)
- Location: National Gallery of Art, Washington D.C.

Approach to Venice is an 1844 landscape painting by the British artist J.M.W. Turner. Produced late in the artist's career, it depicts a view of Venice from the North, across the Lagoon. Turner produced many views of Venice during the 1830s and 1840s, depicting it in Romantic pre-Impressionist style.

The painting was displayed at the Royal Academy Exhibition of 1844 at the National Gallery in London's Trafalgar Square with a couplet from Lord Byron's poem Childe Harold's Pilgrimage. It was described by John Ruskin as "the most perfectly beautiful piece of colour of all I have seen produced by human hands, by any means, or at any period". Today the work is in the collection of the National Gallery of Art in Washington D.C., having been acquired in 1937.

== See also ==
- List of paintings by J. M. W. Turner

== Bibliography ==
- Bailey, Anthony. J.M.W. Turner: Standing in the Sun. Tate Enterprises Ltd, 2013.
- Costello, Leo. J.M.W. Turner and the Subject of History. Routledge, 2017.
- Hamilton, James (ed.) Turner and Italy. National Galleries of Scotland, 2009.
- Reynolds, Graham. Turner. Thames & Hudson, 2022.
