= Portrait of Sir Francis Burdett (Archer Shee) =

1843 painting by Martin Archer Shee

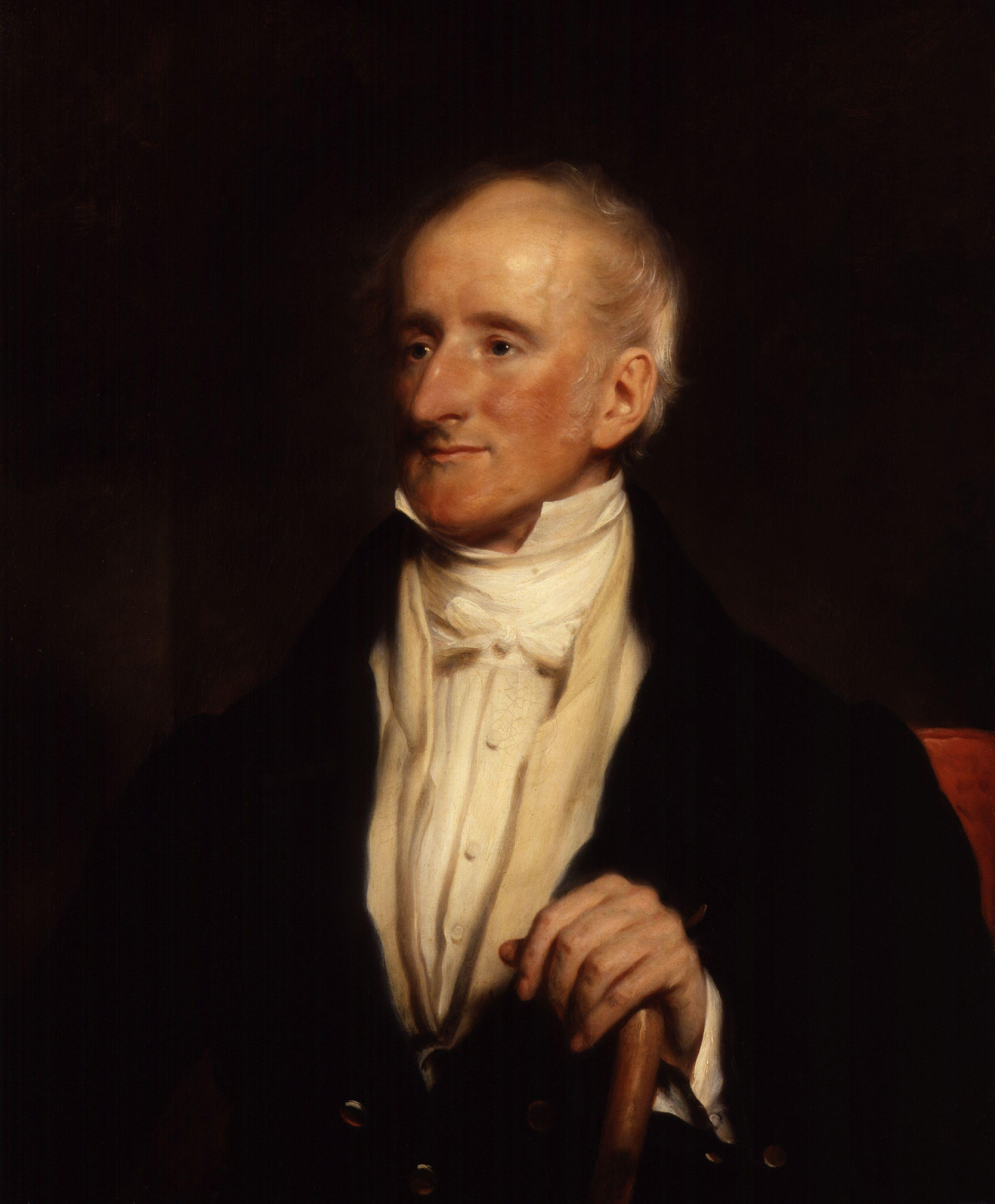
- Artist: Martin Archer Shee
- Year: 1843
- Type: Oil on canvas, portrait painting
- Dimensions: 76.8 cm × 63.9 cm (30.2 in × 25.2 in)
- Location: National Portrait Gallery, London

Portrait of Sir Francis Burdett is an 1843 portrait painting by the Irish artist Martin Archer Shee. It depicts the English politician Sir Francis Burdett. Burdett was a Whig known for his radical views. He is shown at the end of his lengthy career. Archer Shee had previously produced a slightly larger 1838 portrait, with both likely to have been commissioned by Burdett's daughters.

Archer Shee was a noted portraitist of the Regency era who succeeded his rival Thomas Lawrence as President of the Royal Academy in 1830 and held the position until his death in 1850.

This painting was displayed at the Royal Academy Exhibition of 1844 held at the National Gallery in London. It is now in the collection of the neighbouring National Portrait Gallery, haven't been donated by Burdett's daughter in 1876.

== Bibliography ==
- Baetjer, Katharine. British Paintings in the Metropolitan Museum of Art, 1575-1875. Metropolitan Museum of Art, 2009.
- Walker, Richard John Boileau. Regency Portraits, Volume 1. National Portrait Gallery, 1985.
