= Royal Academy Exhibition of 1844 =

1844 art exhibition in London

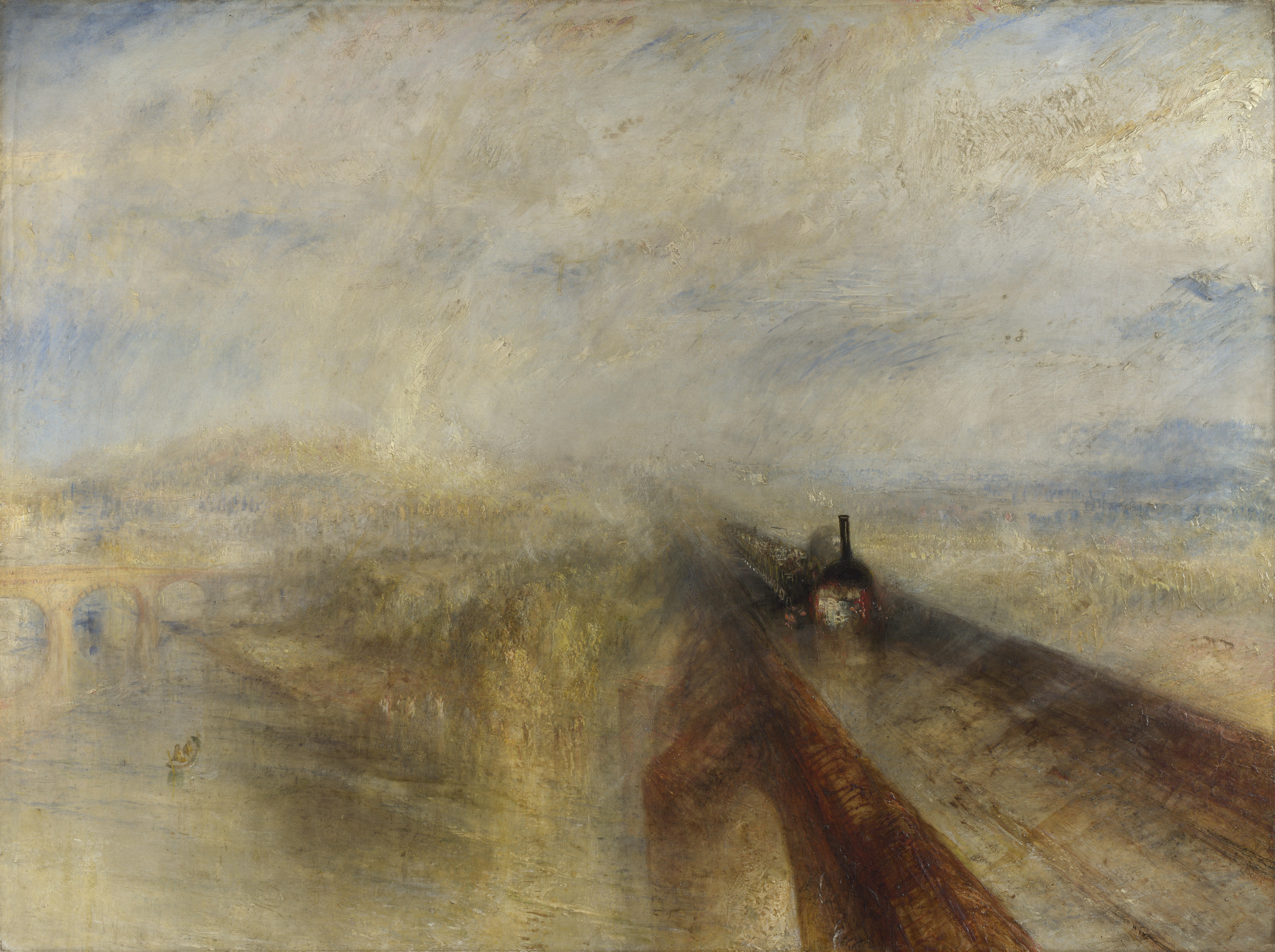
Rain, Steam and Speed – The Great Western Railway by J.M.W. Turner

Royal Academy Exhibition of 1844 was the seventy sixth annual Summer Exhibition of the British Royal Academy of Arts. It was held at the National Gallery in London from 6 May to 27 July and featured submissions from leading painters, sculptors and architects of the early Victorian era.

The best-known painting to feature in the exhibition was Turner's Rain, Steam and Speed showing crossing the Great Western Railway's recently opened Maidenhead Railway Bridge, designed by Isambard Kingdom Brunel. Amongst the other six oil paintings Turner displayed were three scenes of Venice, a major theme of his work during the period.

Edwin Landseer, known for his animal paintings, submitted Shoeing and The Otter Speared, the later a depiction of an otter hunt in Scotland commissioned by the politician Lord Aberdeen. William Collins displayed the landscape paintings Seaford, Sussex and Morning, Boulogne. The French artist Paul Delaroche exhibited a religious painting.

The President of the Royal Academy Martin Archer Shee displayed a portrait of the veteran radical politician Sir Francis Burdett.

== Gallery ==
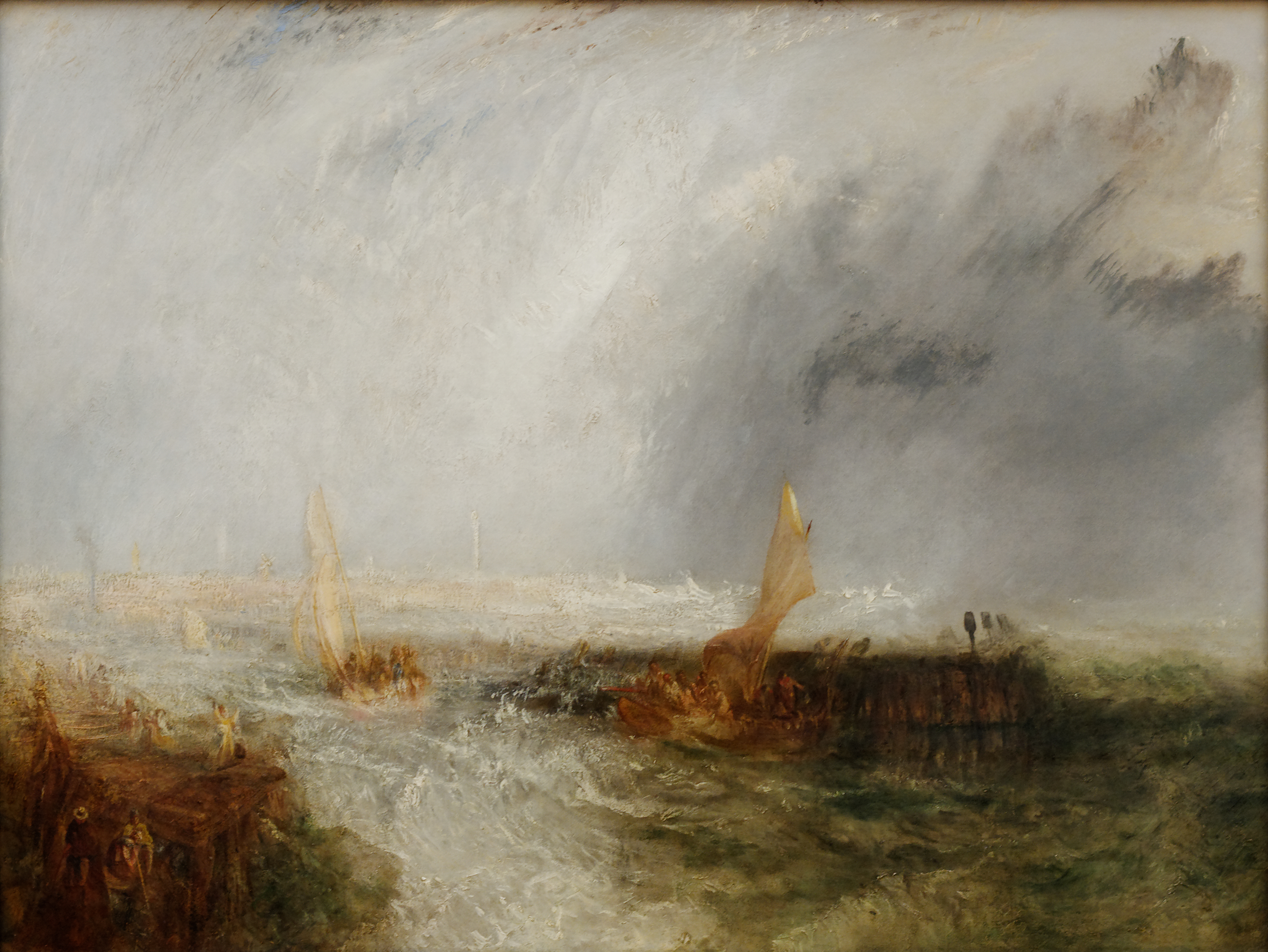
Ostend by J.M.W. Turner

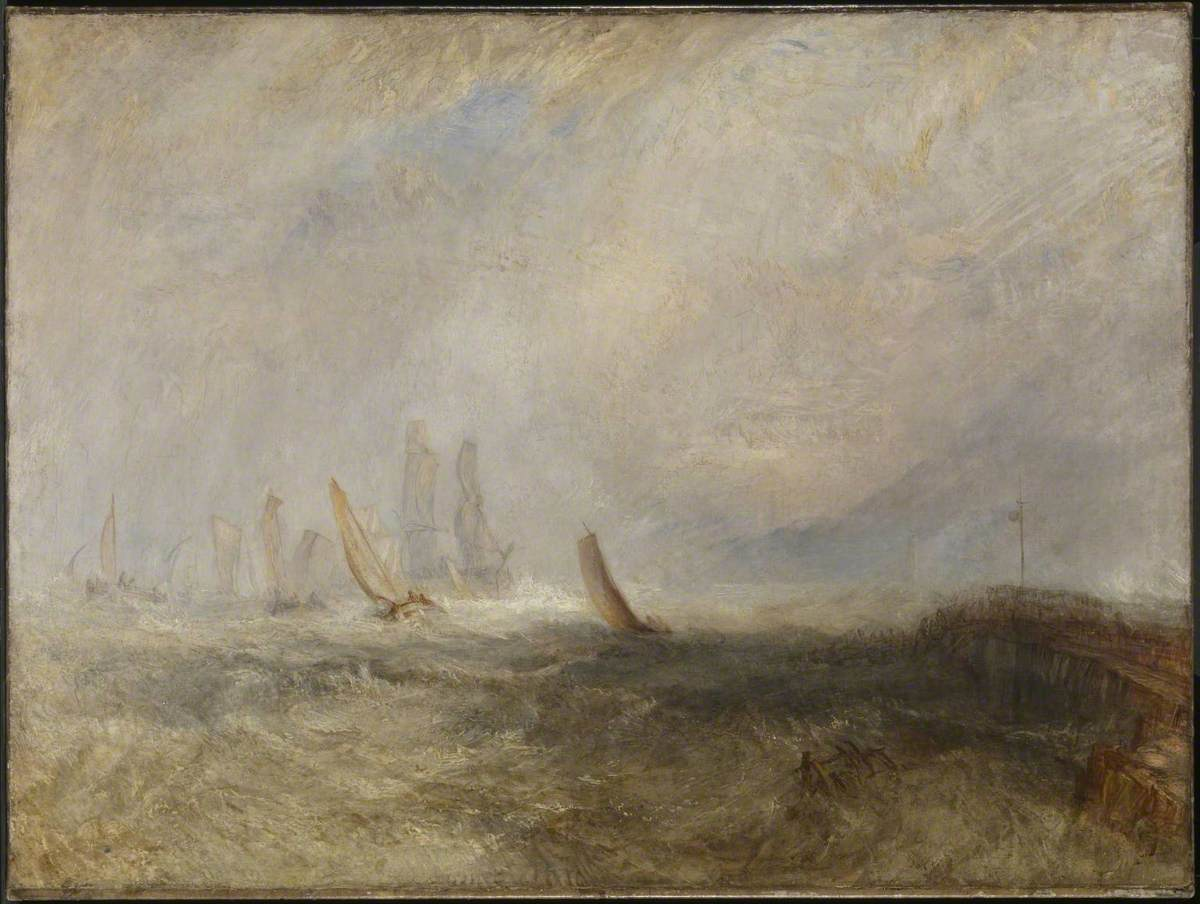
Fishing Boats Bringing a Disabled Ship into Port Ruysdael by J.M.W. Turner

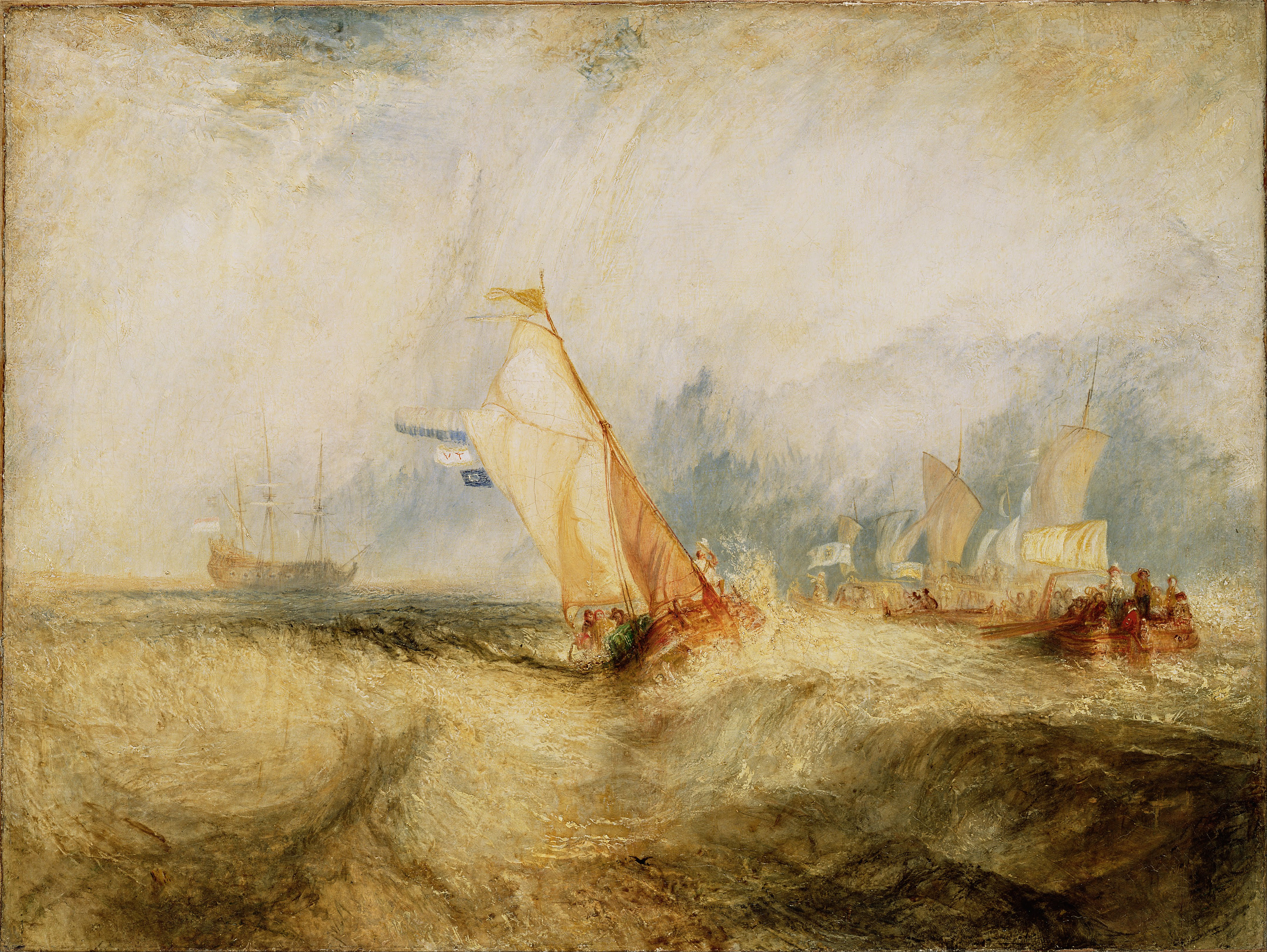
Van Tromp, Going About to Please His Masters by J.M.W. Turner

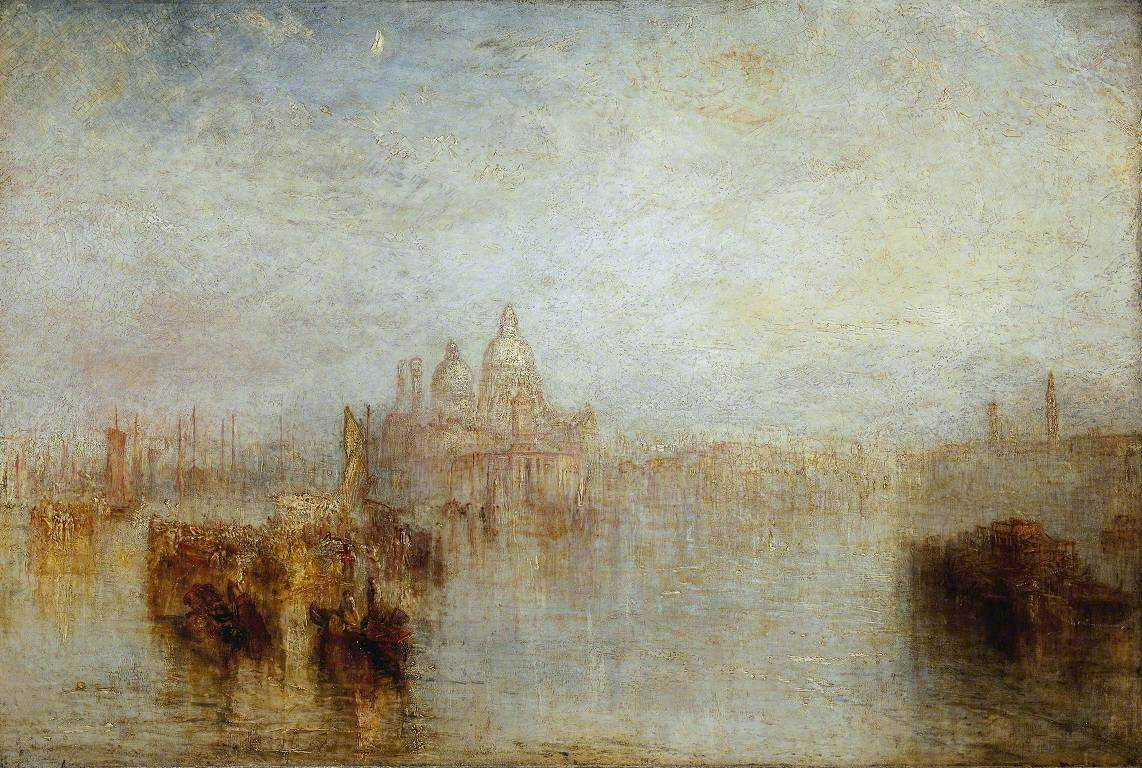
Venice, Maria della Salute by J.M.W. Turner

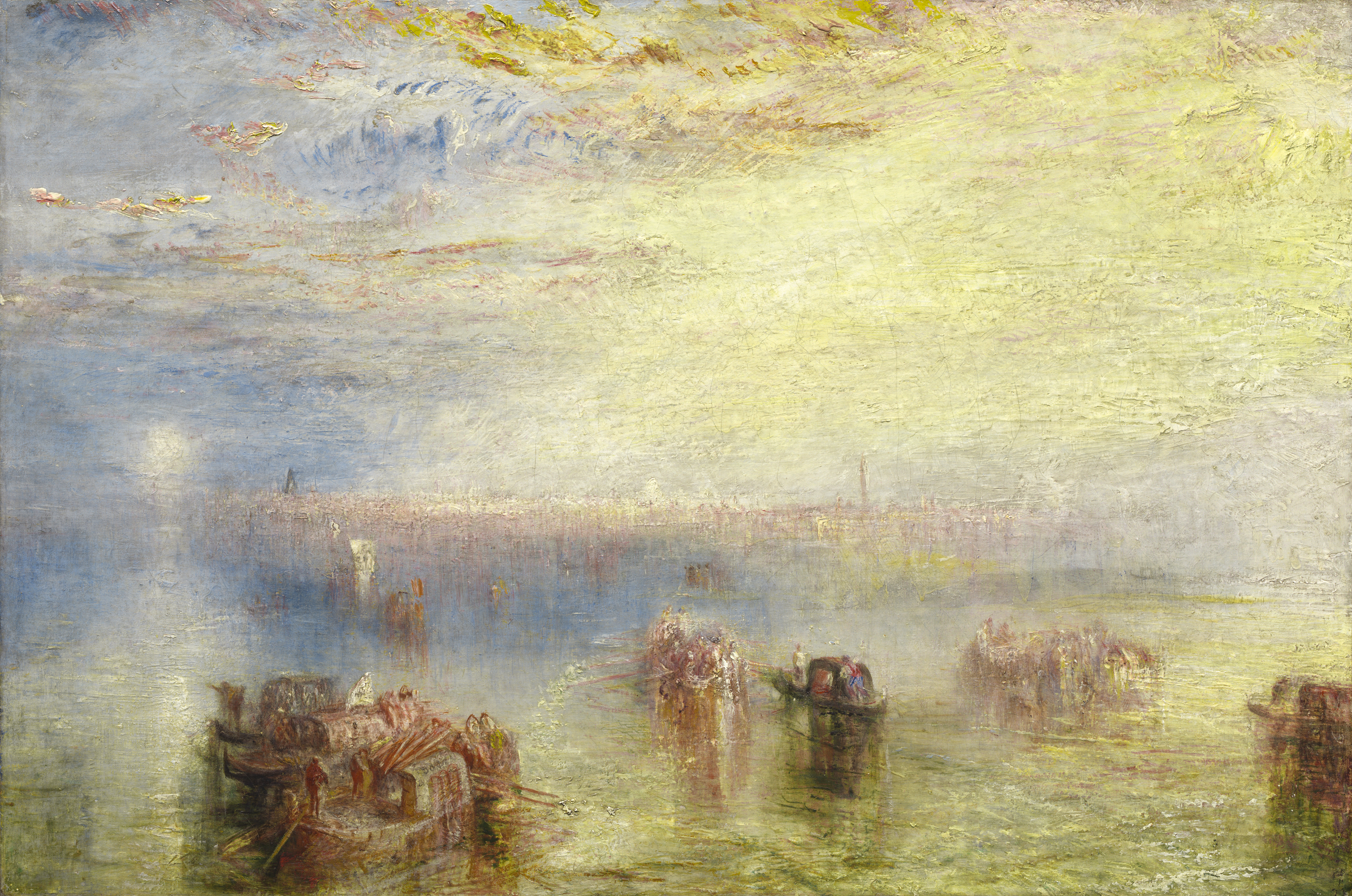
Approach to Venice by J.M.W. Turner

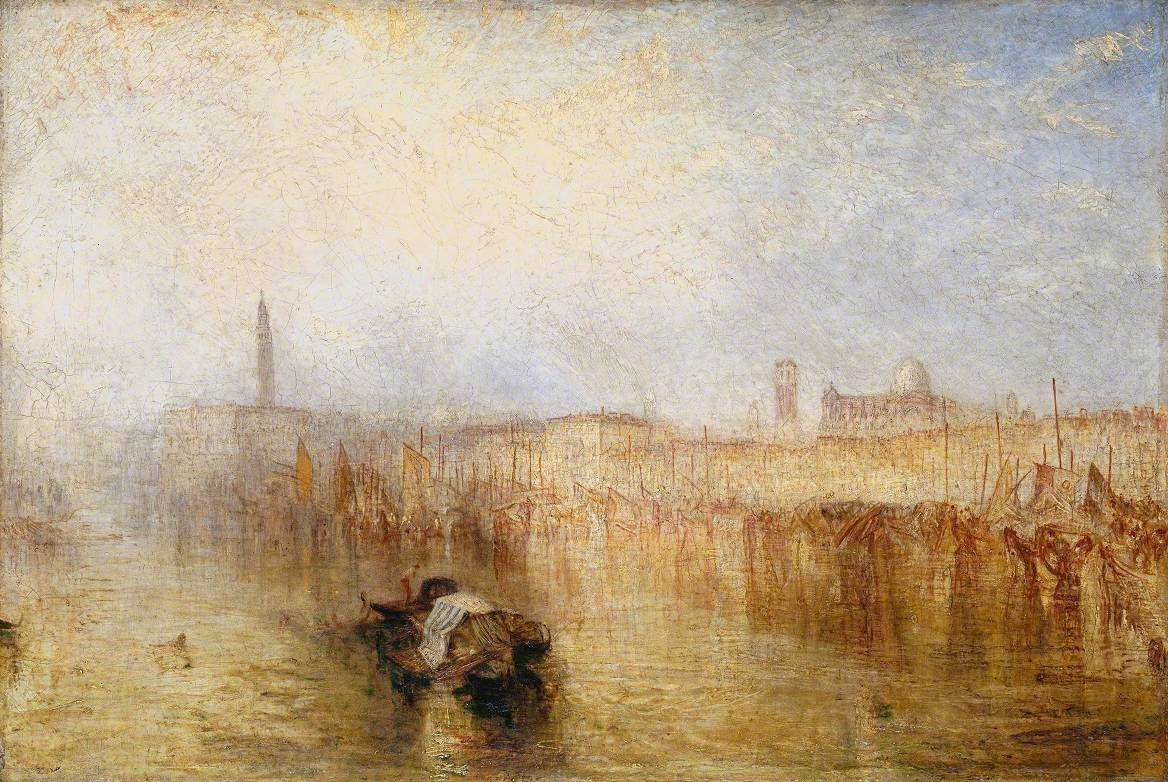
Venice Quay, Ducal Palace by J.M.W. Turner

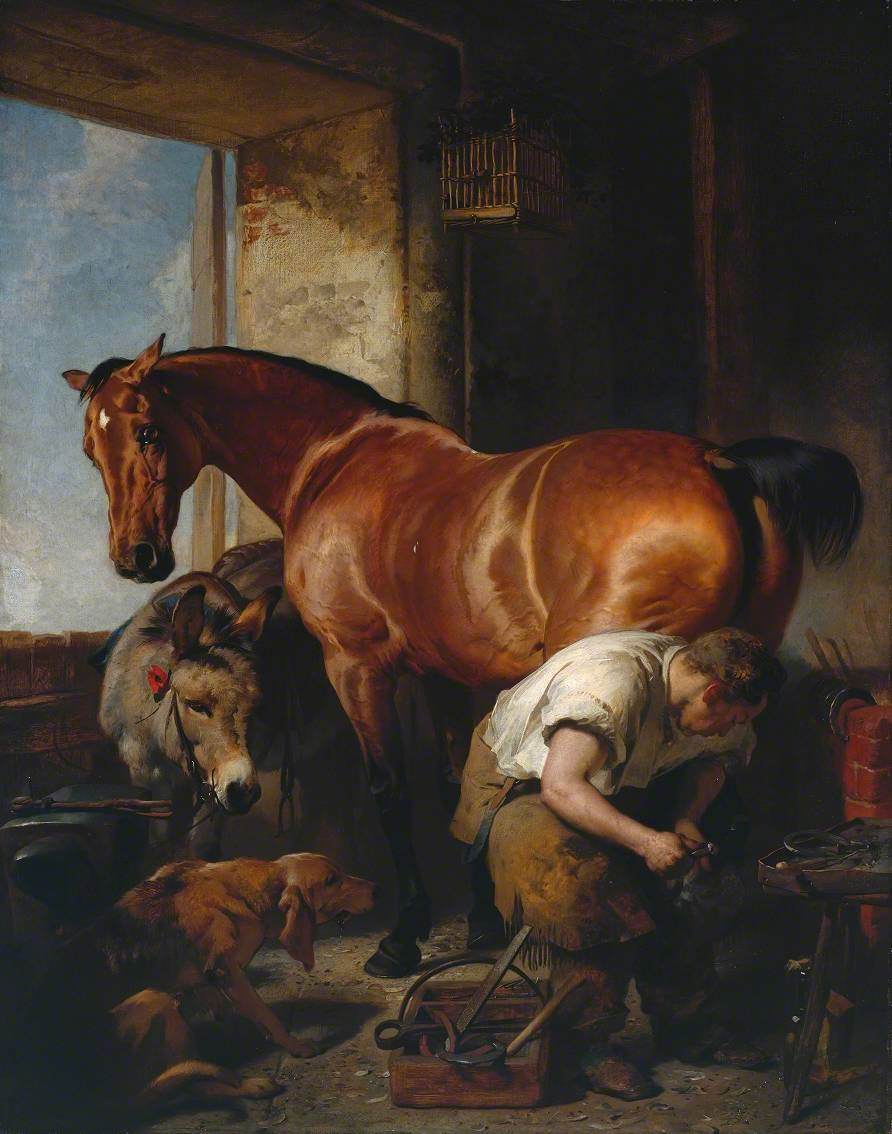
Shoeing by Edwin Landseer

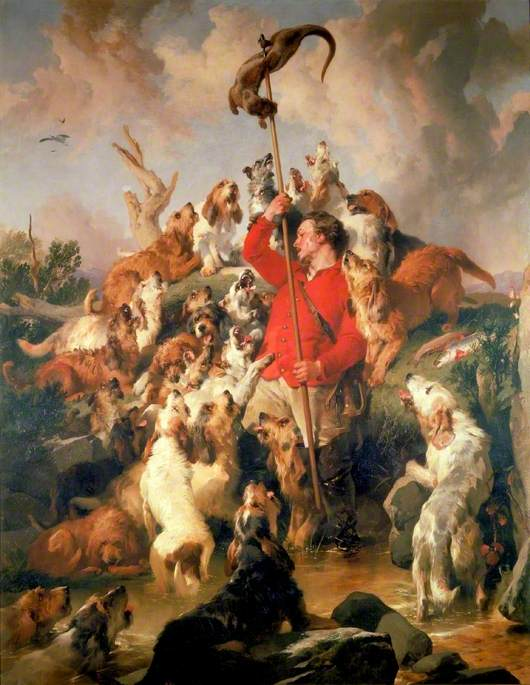
The Otter Speared by Edwin Landseer

Seaford, Sussex by William Collins

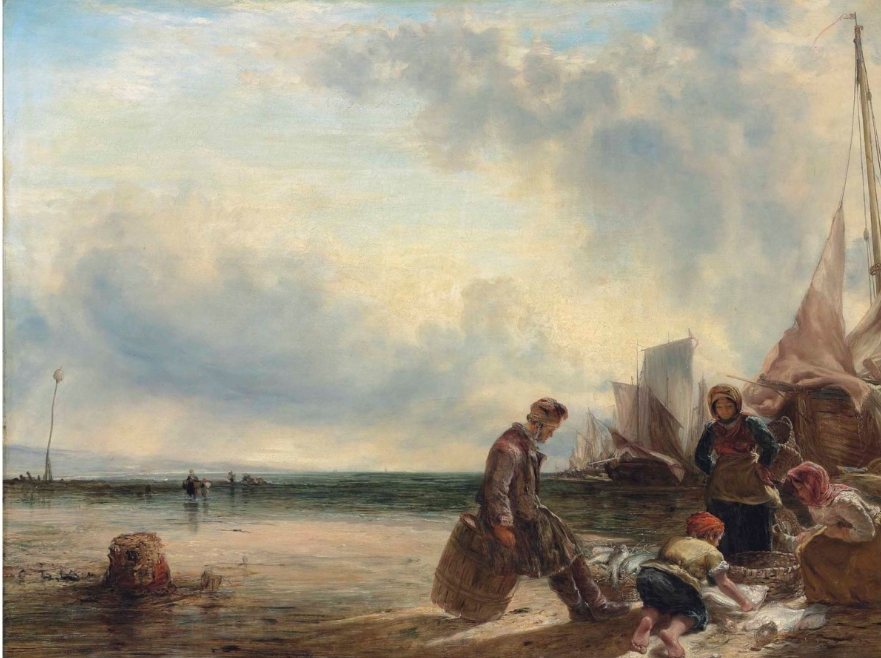
Morning, Boulogne by William Collins

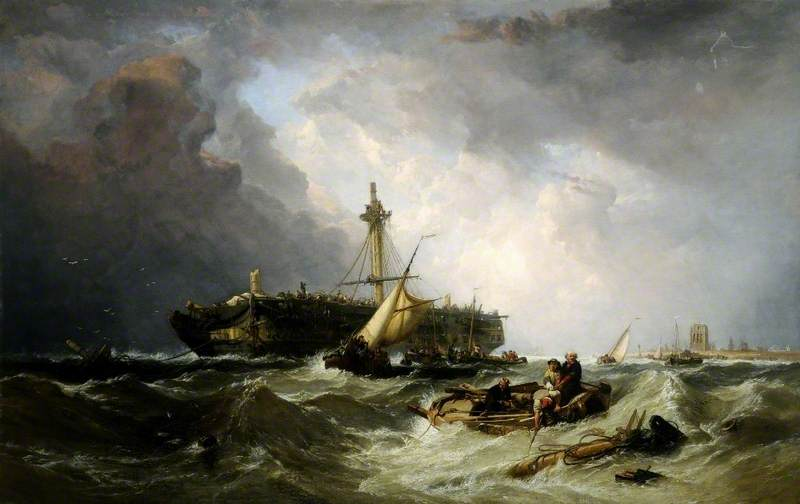
The Morning after the Wreck by Clarkson Stanfield

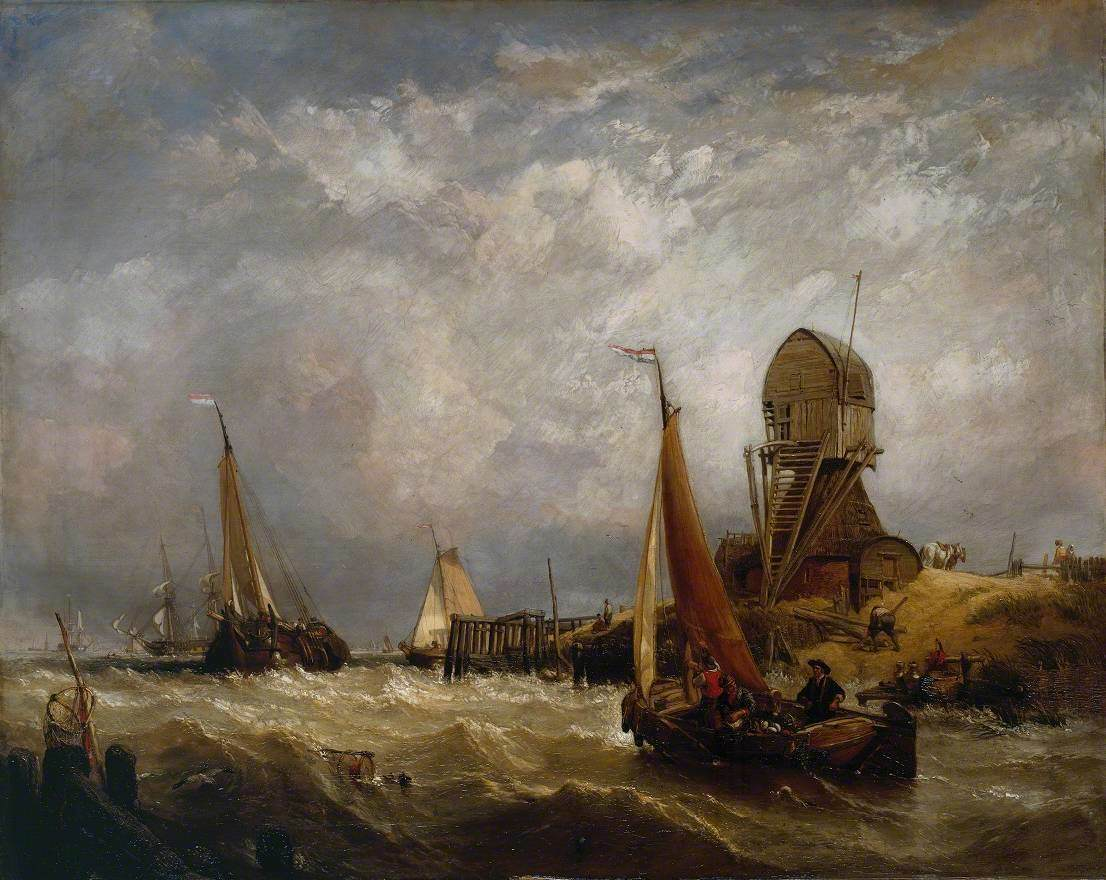
Oude Scheld – Texel Island by Clarkson Stanfield

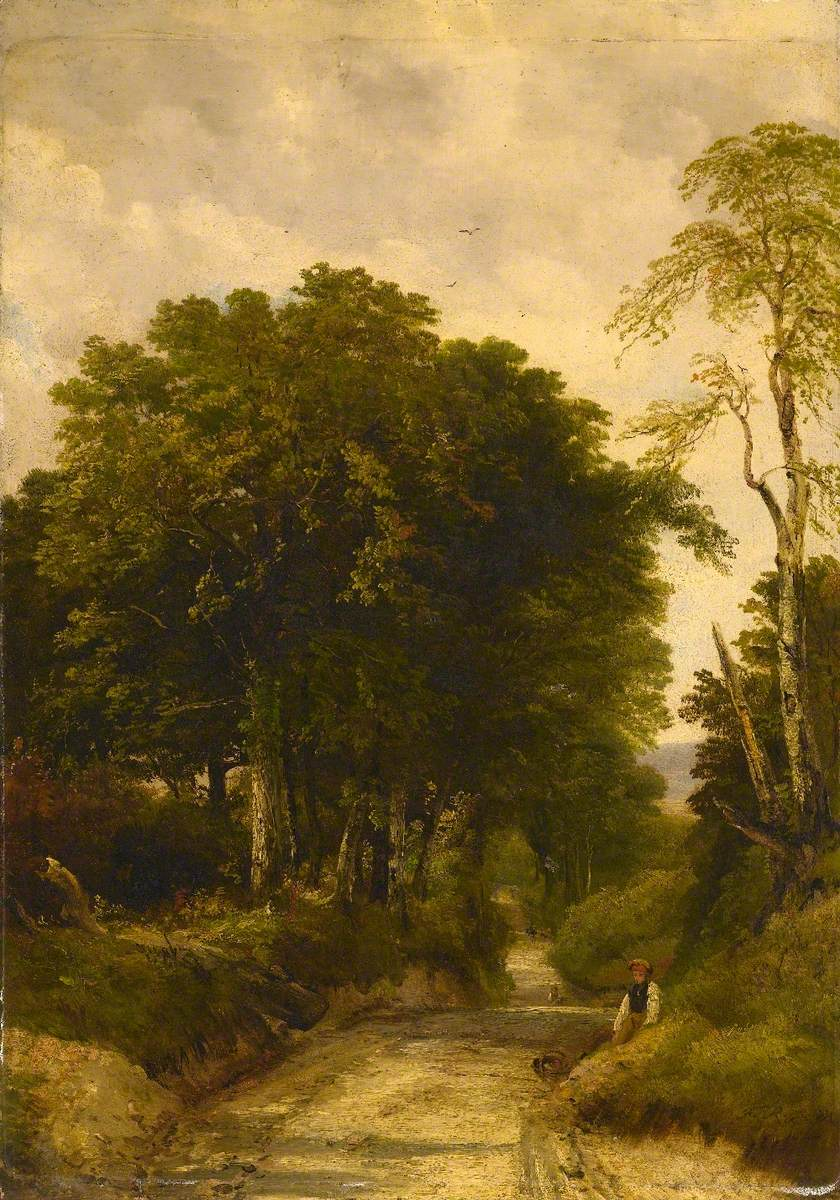
A Devon Lane by Frederick Richard Lee

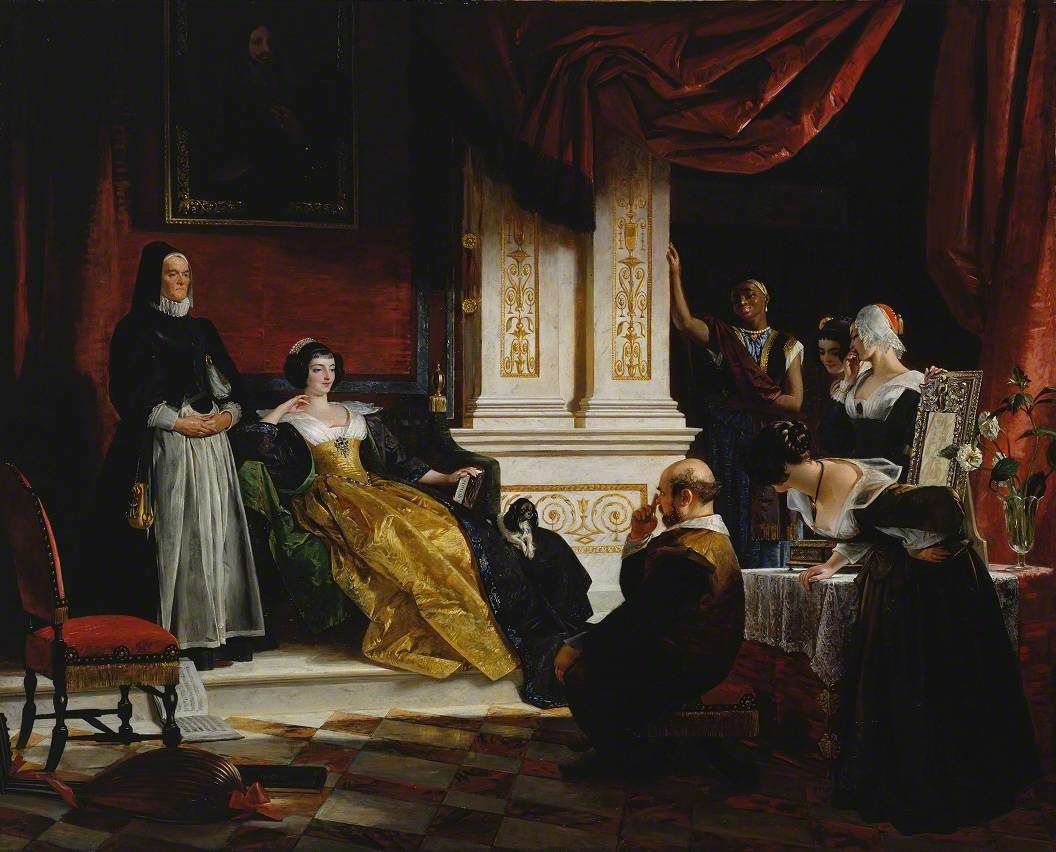
Sancho Panza in the Apartment of the Duchess by Charles Robert Leslie

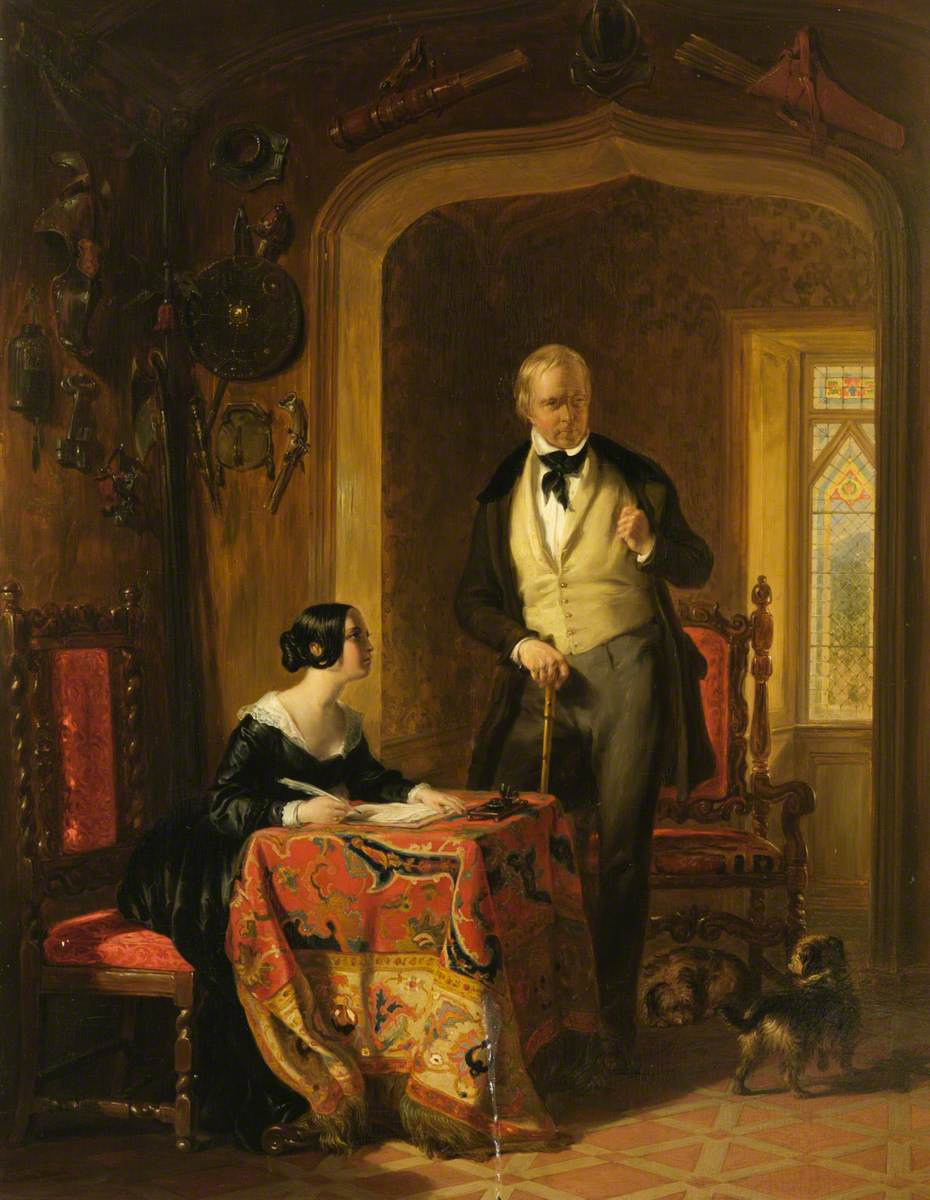
Sir Walter Scott Dictating to His Daughter by William Allan

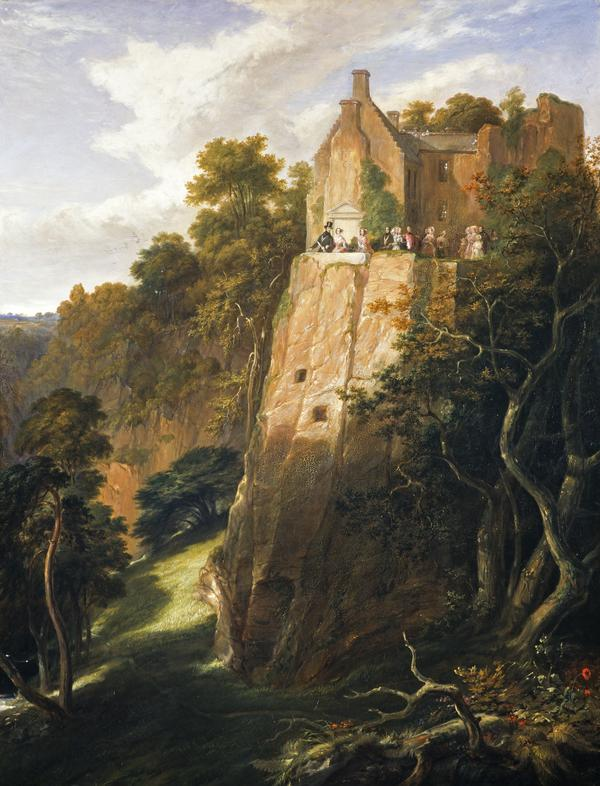
The Visit of Queen Victoria and Prince Albert to Hawthornden by William Allan

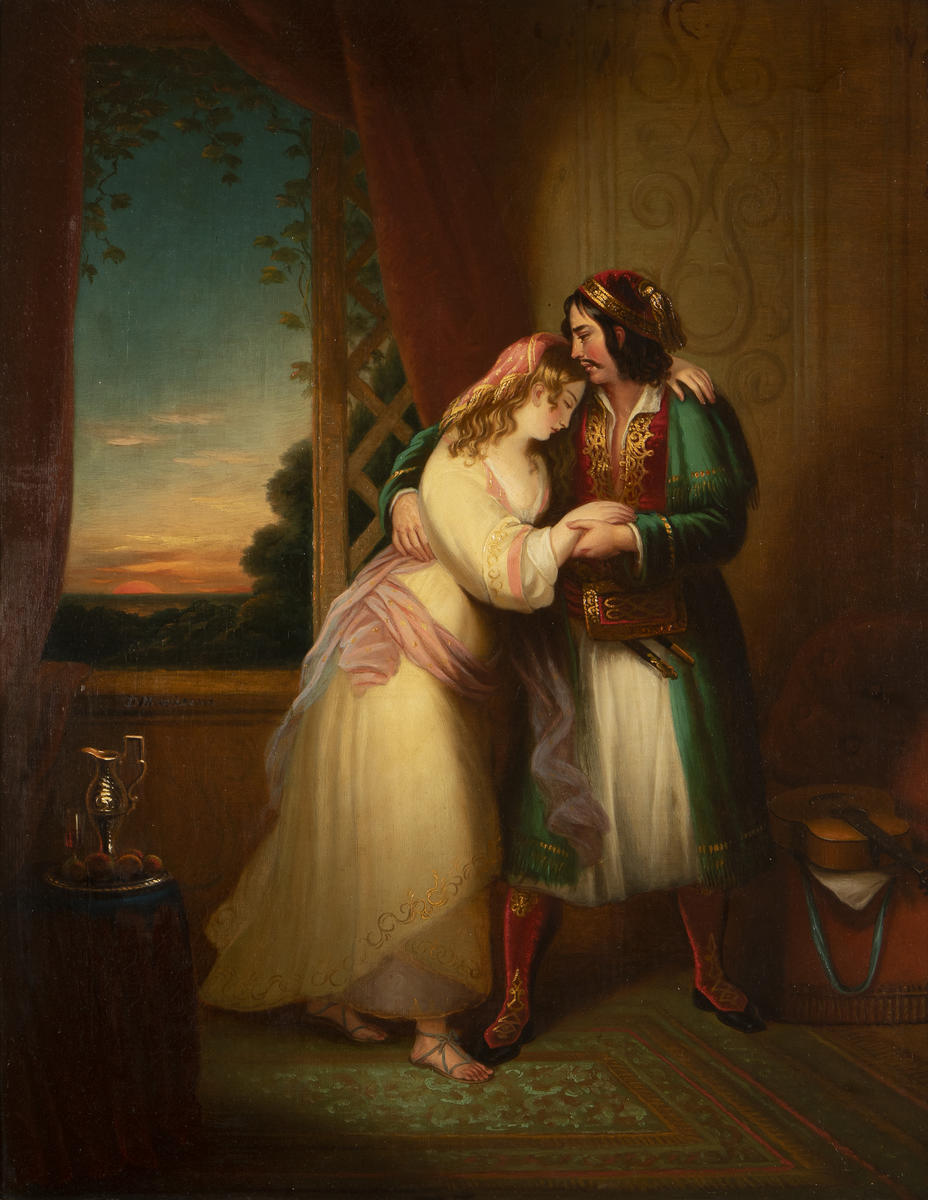
A Scene from Milton's Comus by Daniel Maclise

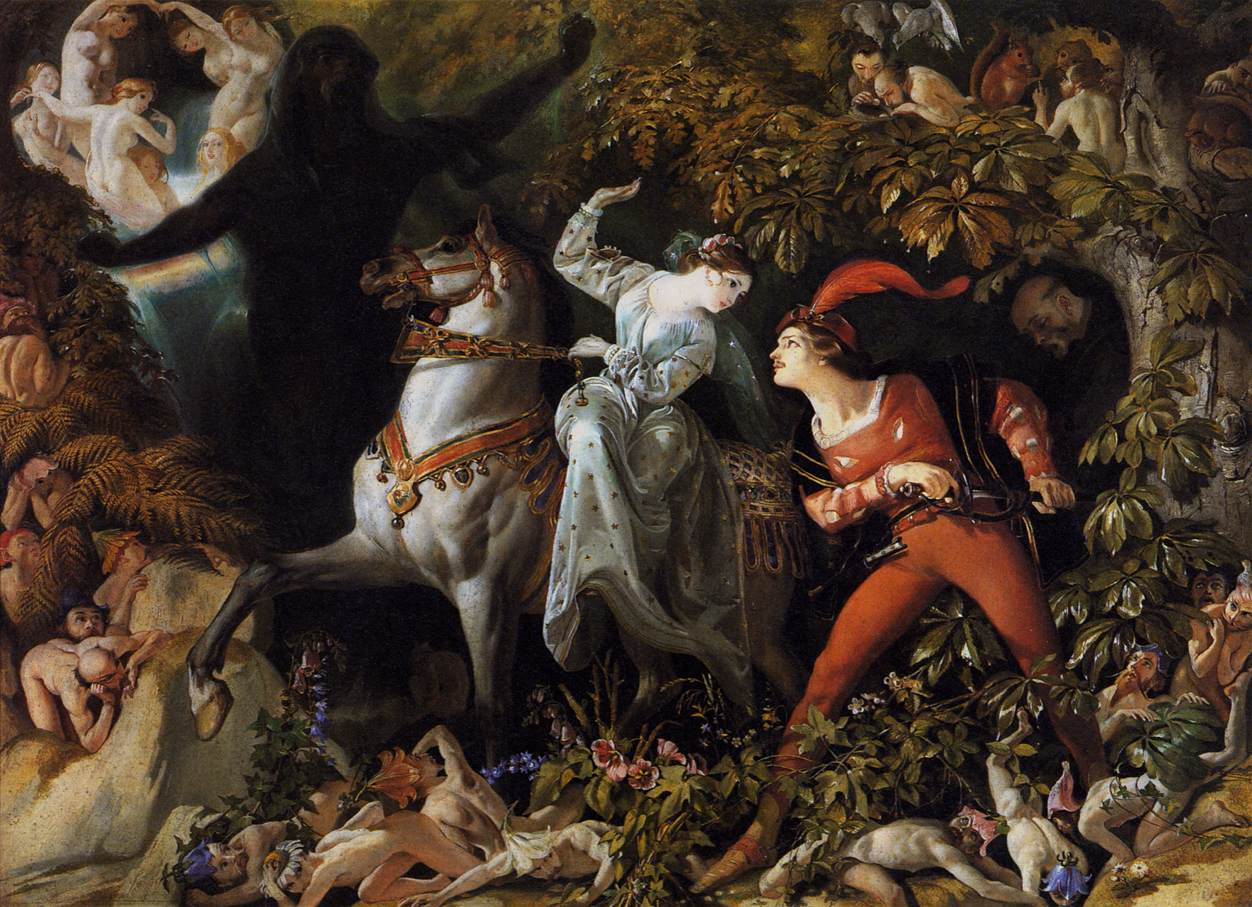
A Scene from Undine by Daniel Maclise

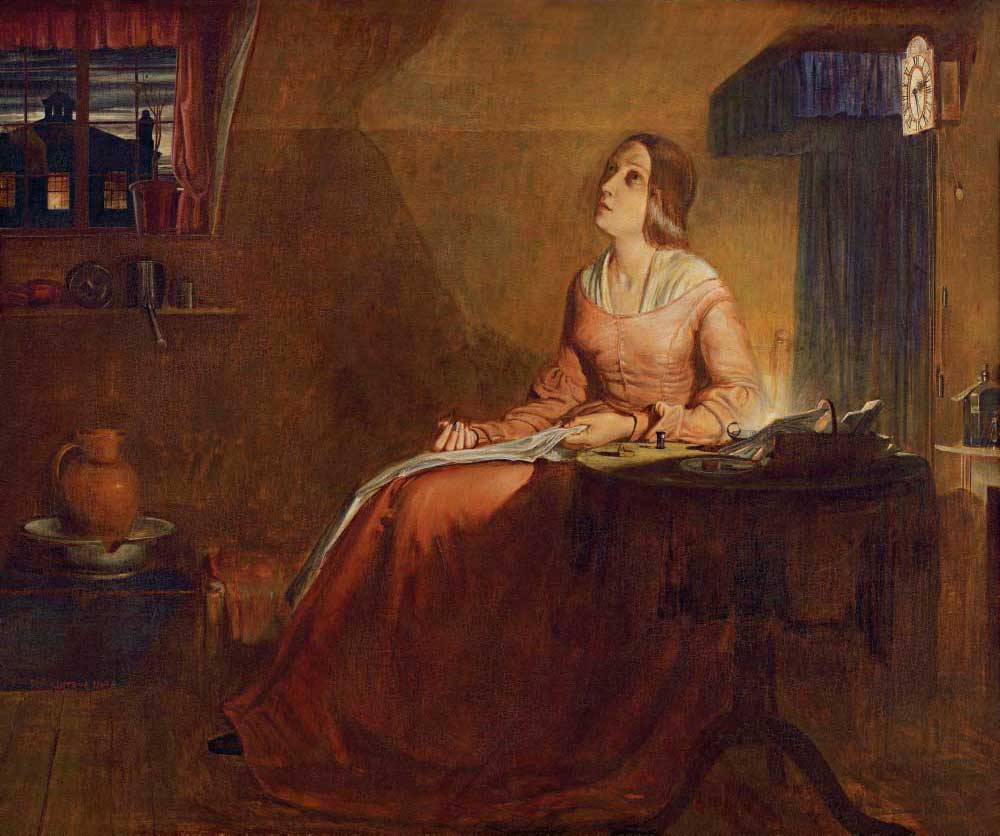
The Sempstress by Richard Redgrave

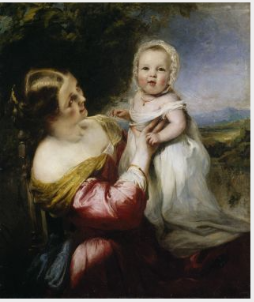
The Young Mother's Pastime by Richard Rothwell

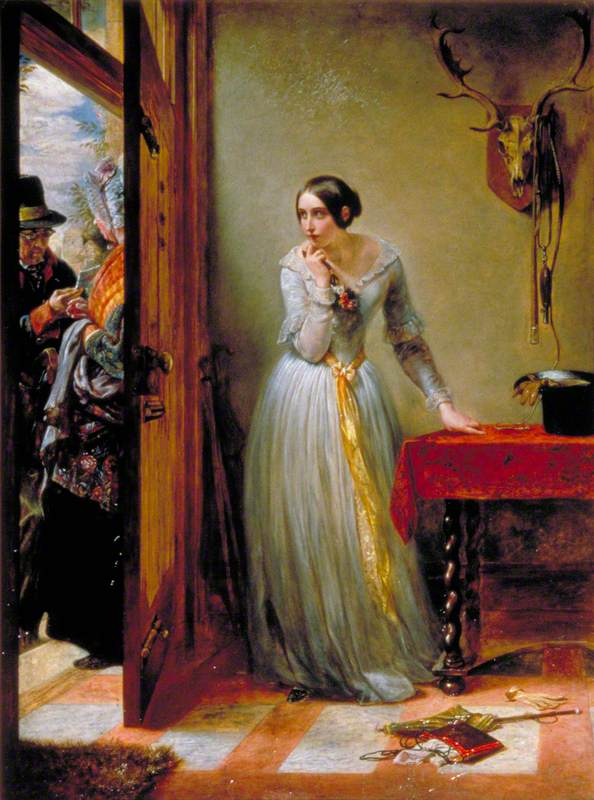
Palpitation by Charles West Cope

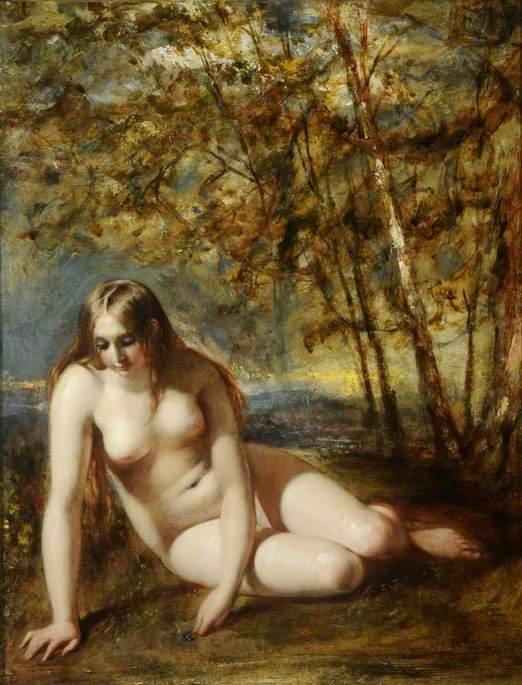
Eve at the Fountain by William Etty

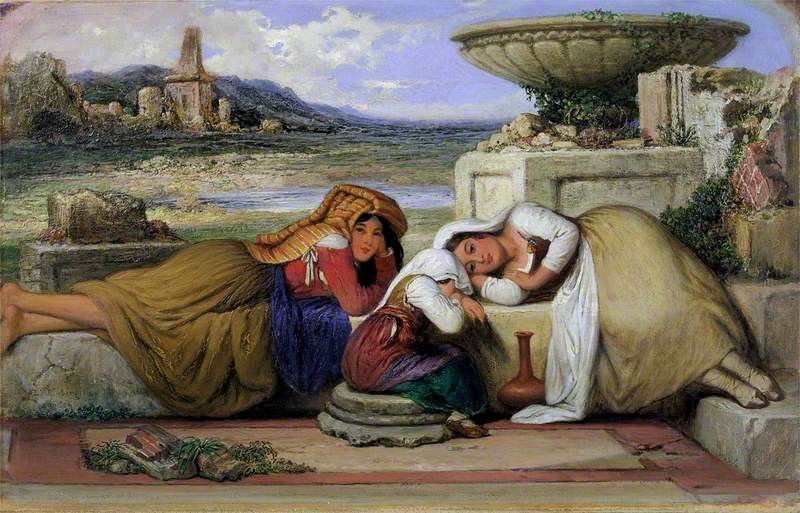
Mendicants of the Roman Campagna by Edward Villiers Rippingille

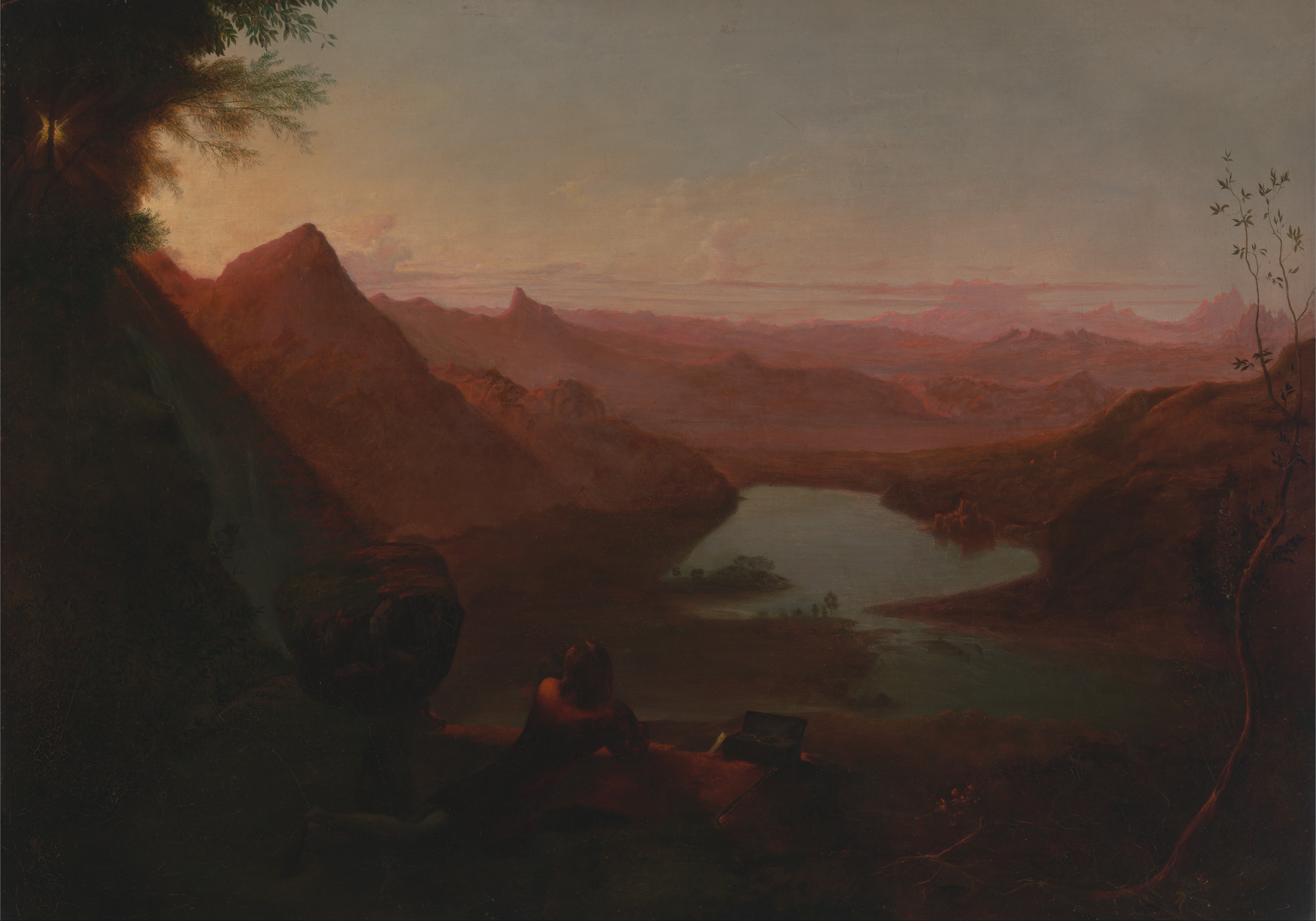
The Painter's Holiday by Francis Danby

Claverhouse Ordering Morton to be Carried Out and Shot by Robert Scott Lauder

Poor Louise by Robert Scott Lauder

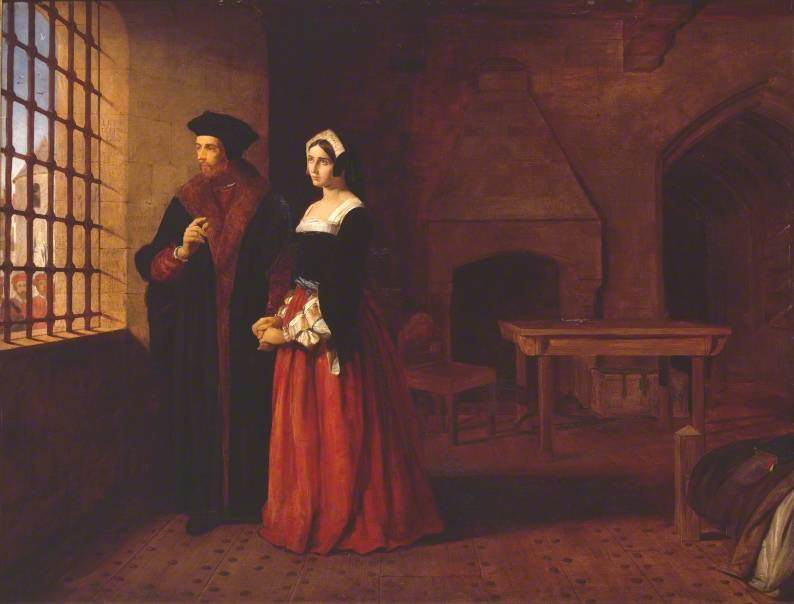
Sir Thomas More and his Daughter by John Rogers Herbert

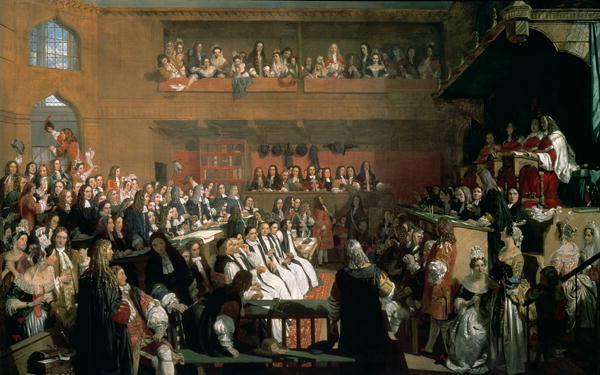
The Trial of the Seven Bishops by John Rogers Herbert

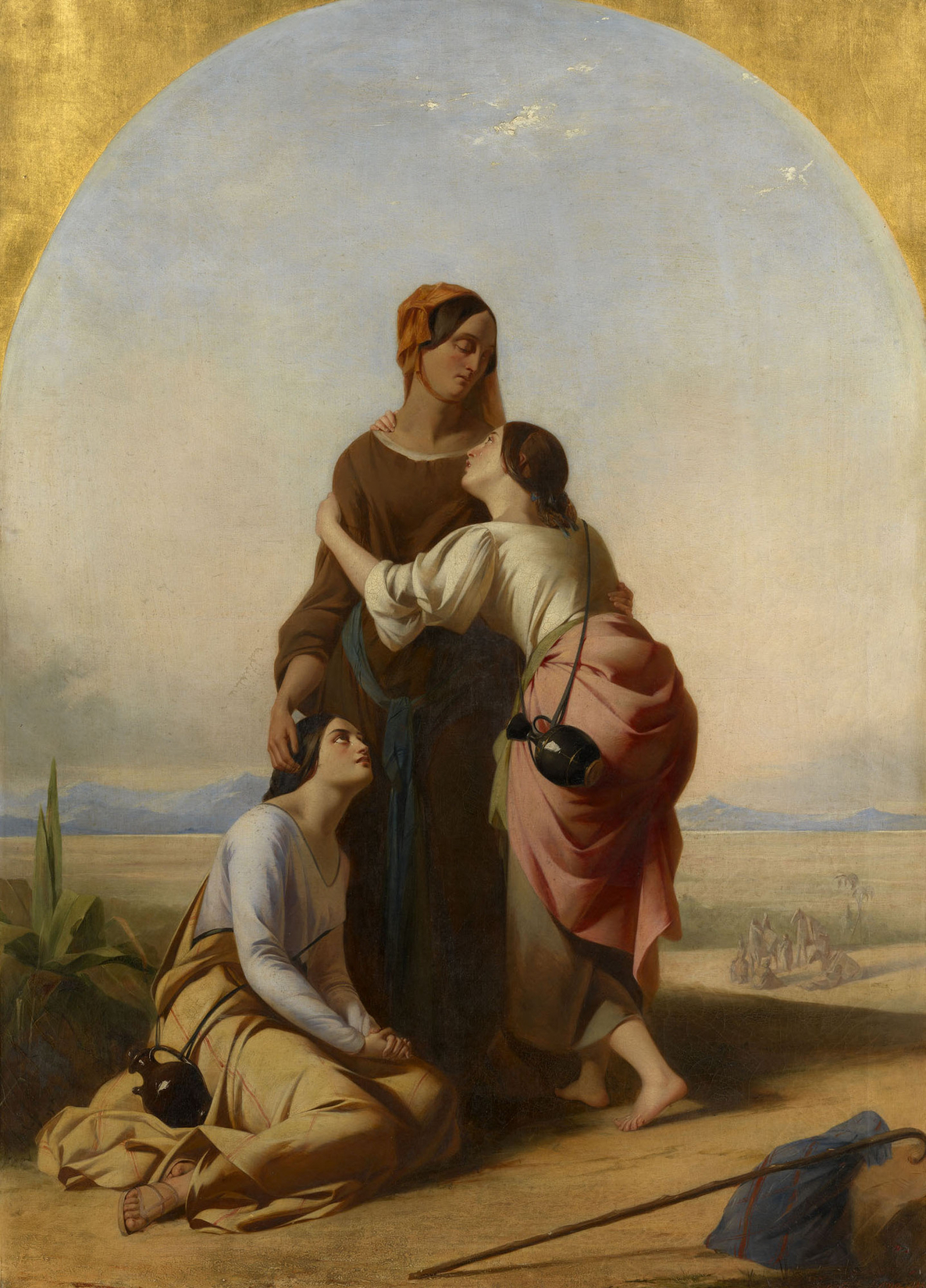
Naomi with her Daughters-in-Law by Henry Nelson O'Neil

The Mall, Kensington Gravel Pits by William Mulready

Scene on the Tummel, Perthshire by Thomas Creswick

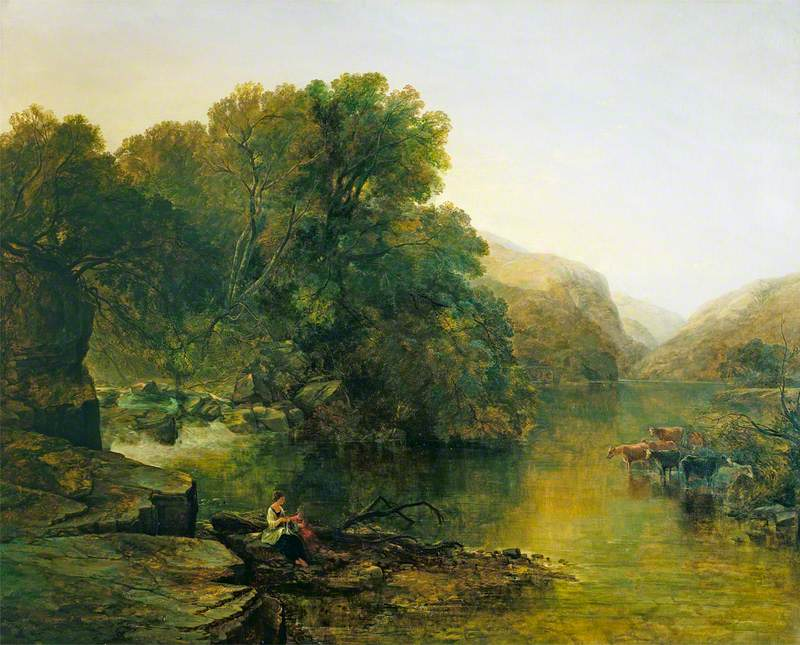
A Summer's Afternoon by Thomas Creswick

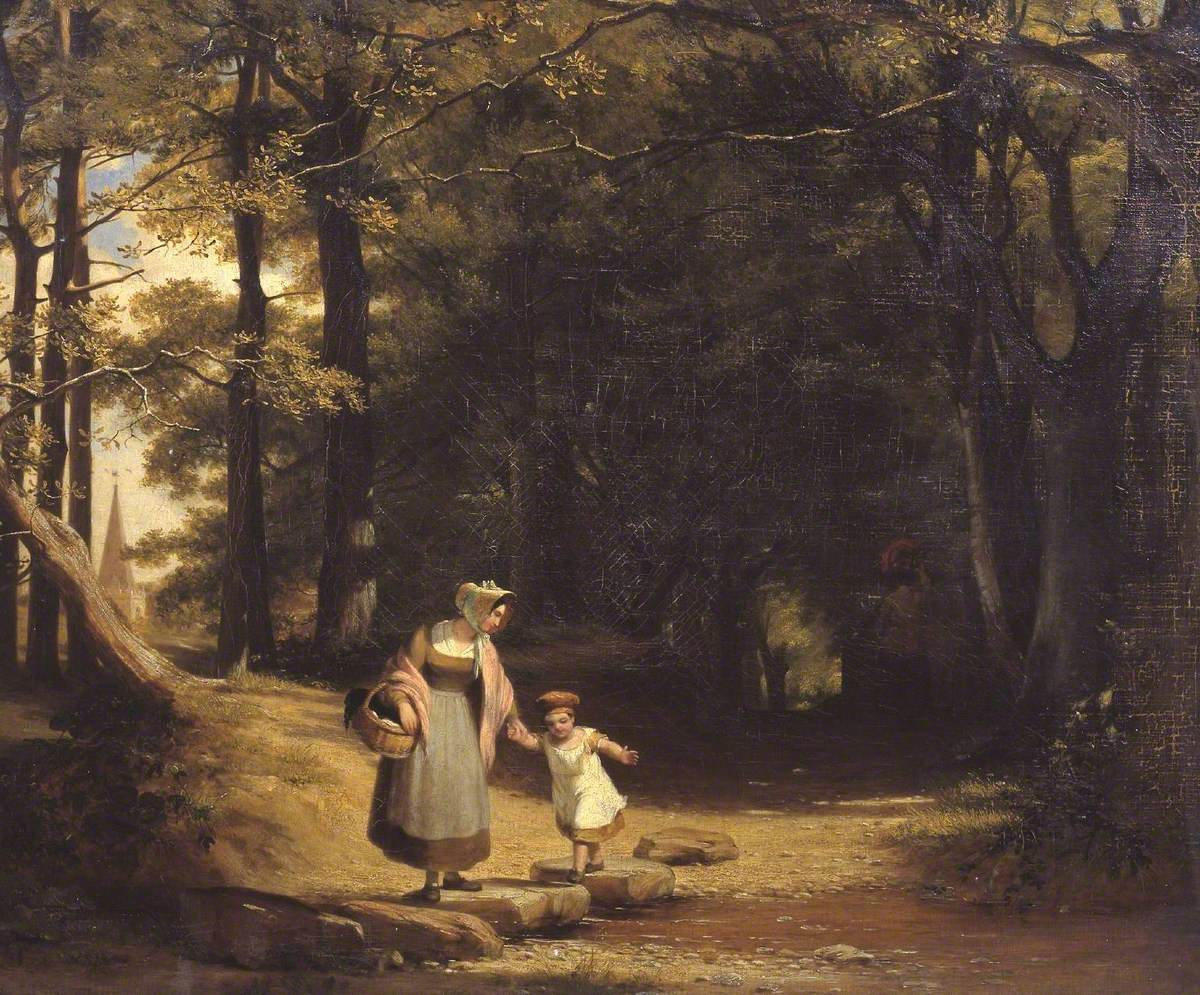
Stepping Stones on the Machno, North Wales by William Frederick Witherington

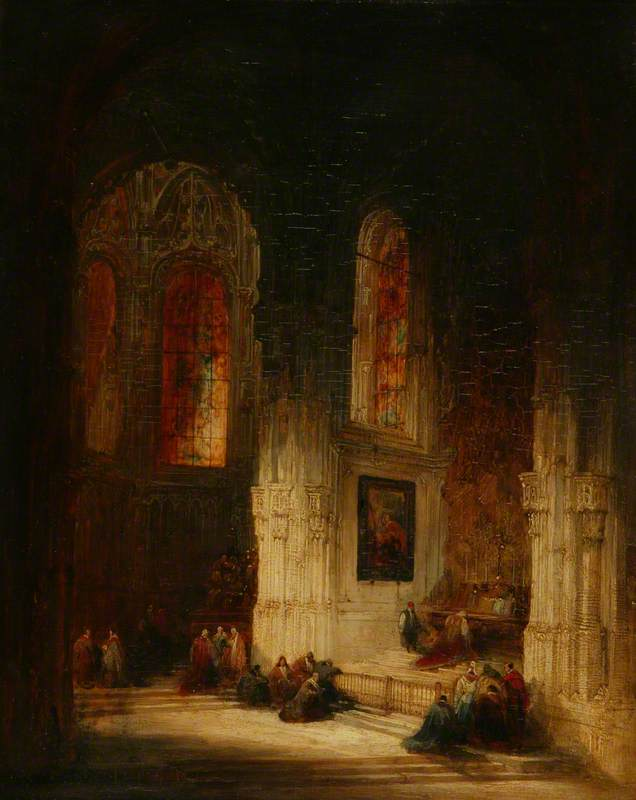
Church of St Pierre, Caen by David Roberts

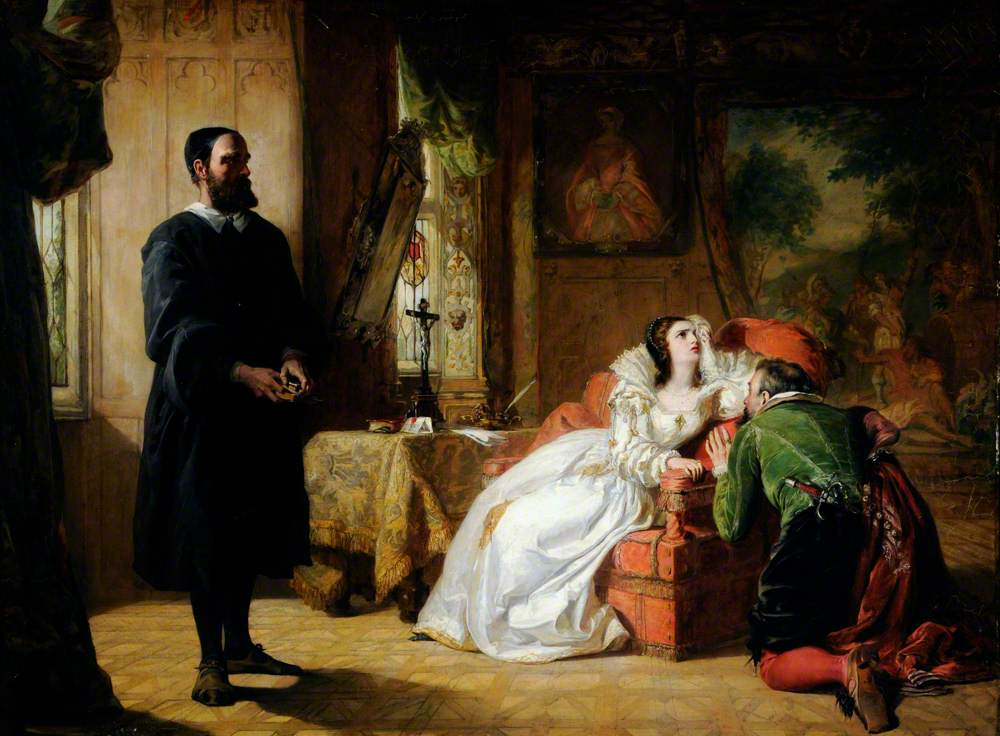
John Knox Reproving Mary, Queen of Scots by William Powell Frith

Carolan, the Irish Bard by James Christopher Timbrell

La Fleur's departure from Montreuil by Edward Matthew Ward

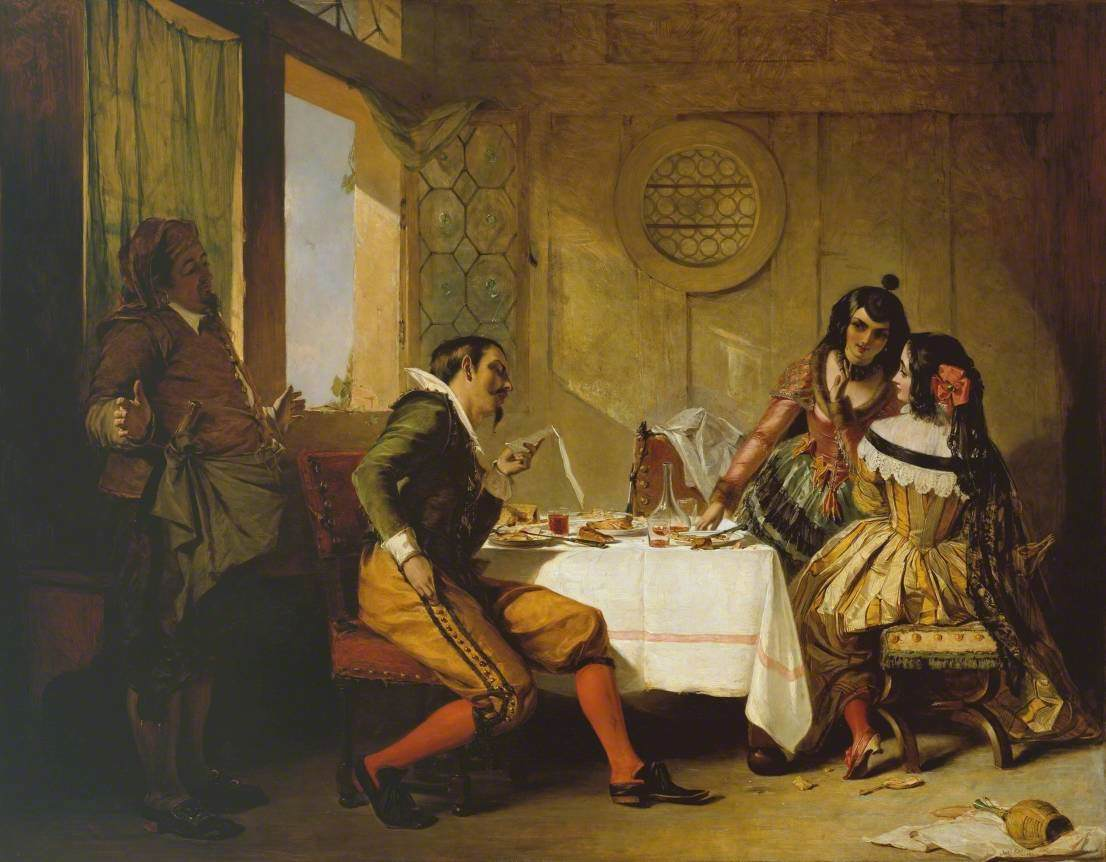
The Devil Upon Two Sticks by Augustus Egg

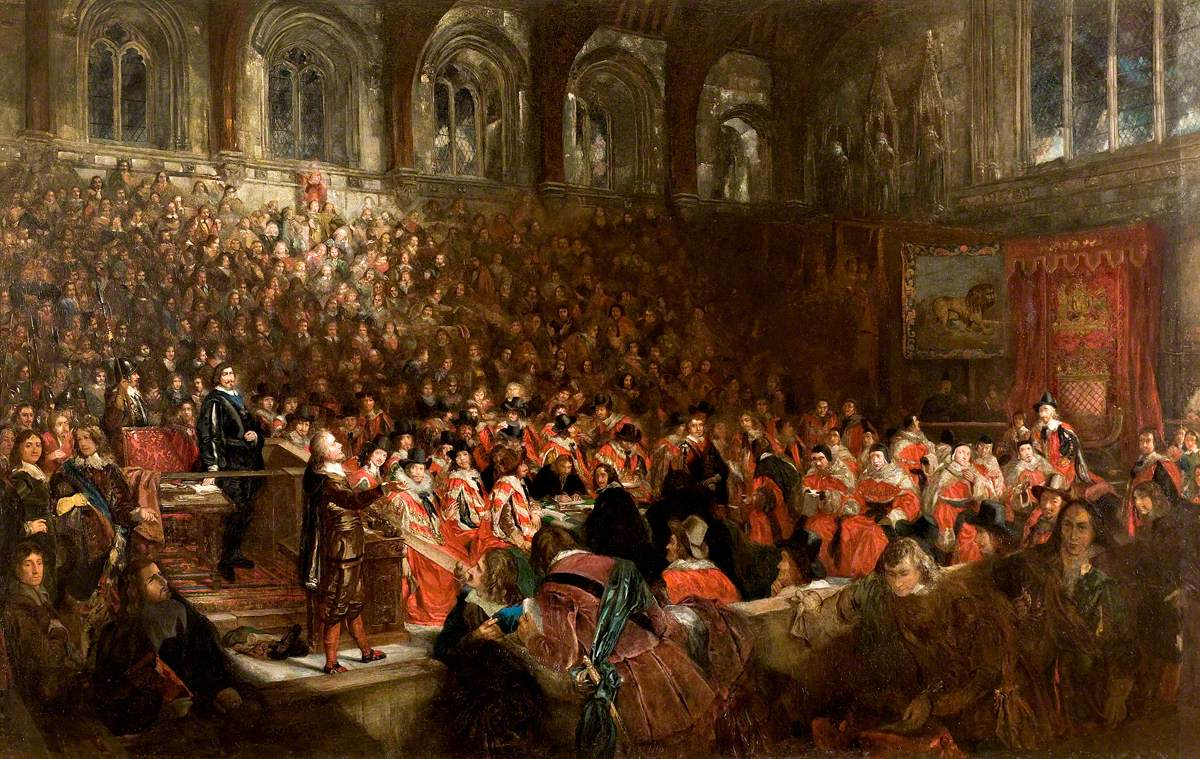
The Trial of the Earl of Strafford by Thomas Woolnoth

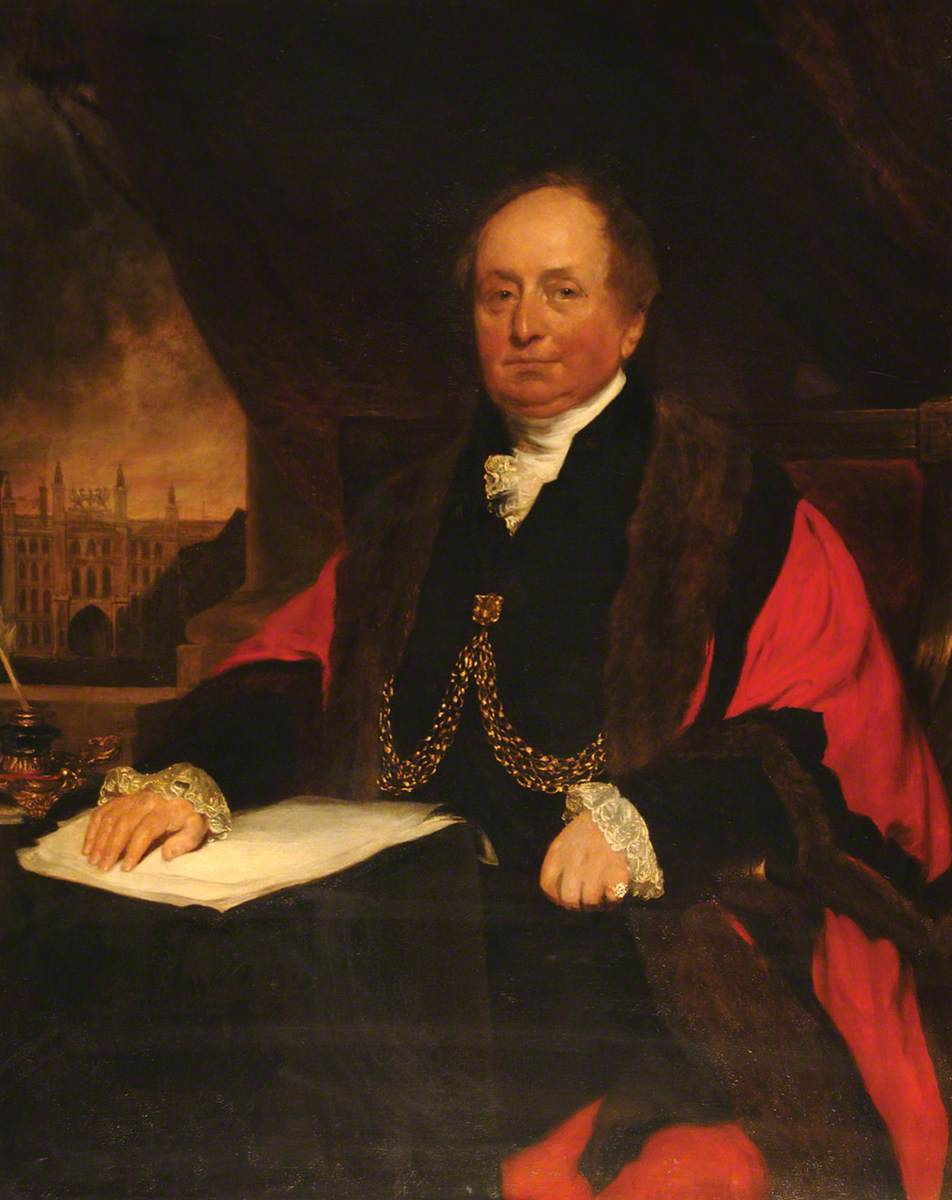
Alderman Anthony Brown by Samuel Lane

Portrait of William Allen by Henry Perronet Briggs

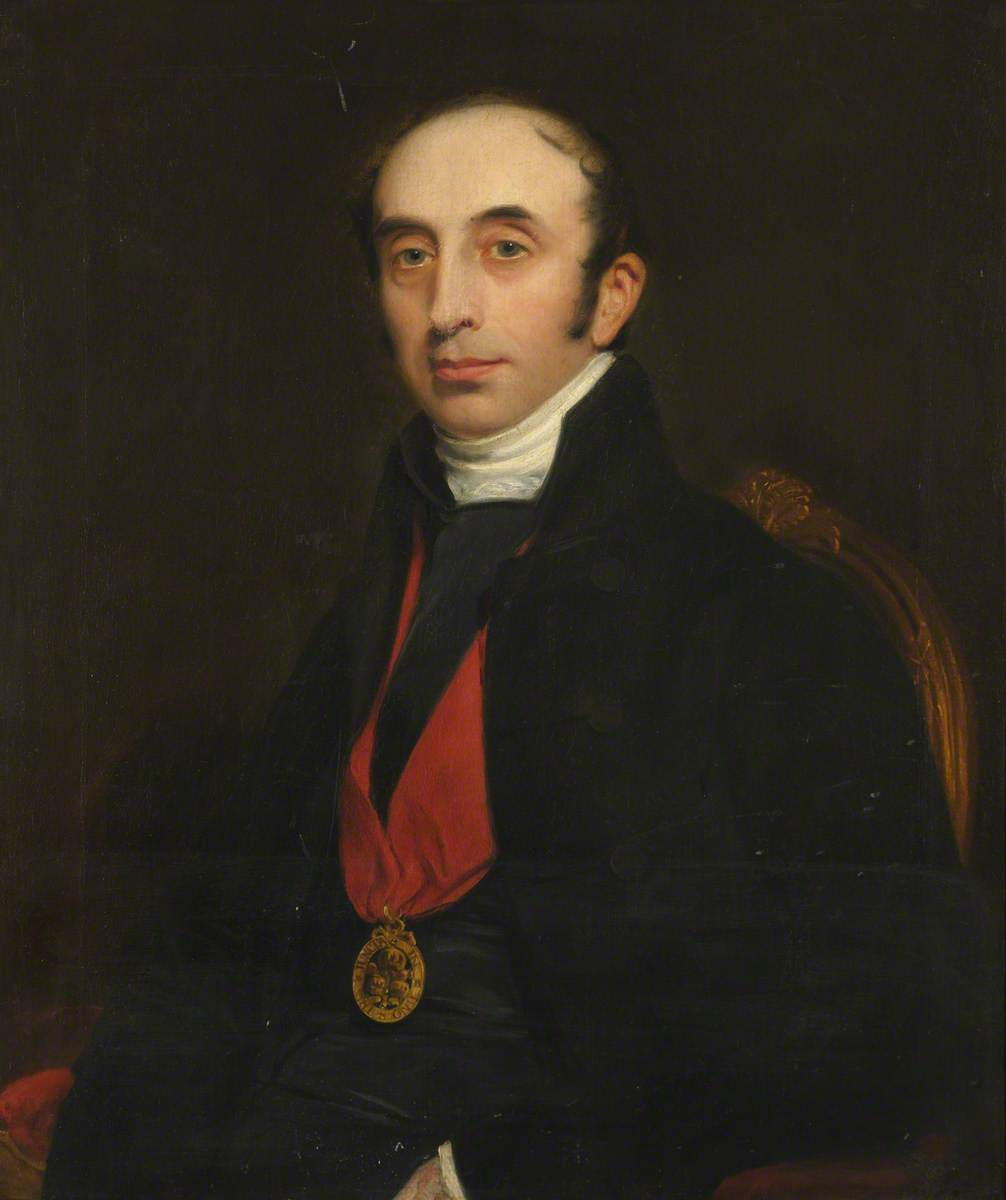
Portrait of Thomas Turton by Henry William Pickersgill

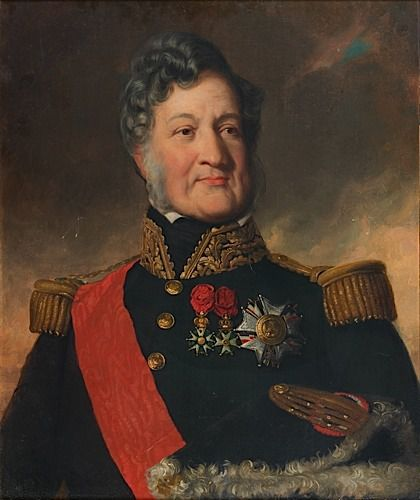
Portrait of Louis Philippe by George Peter Alexander Healy

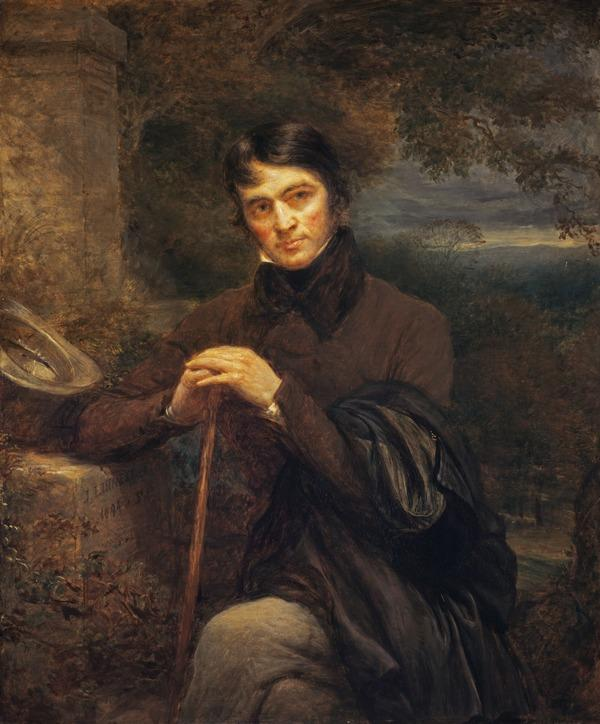
Portrait of Thomas Carlyle by John Linnell

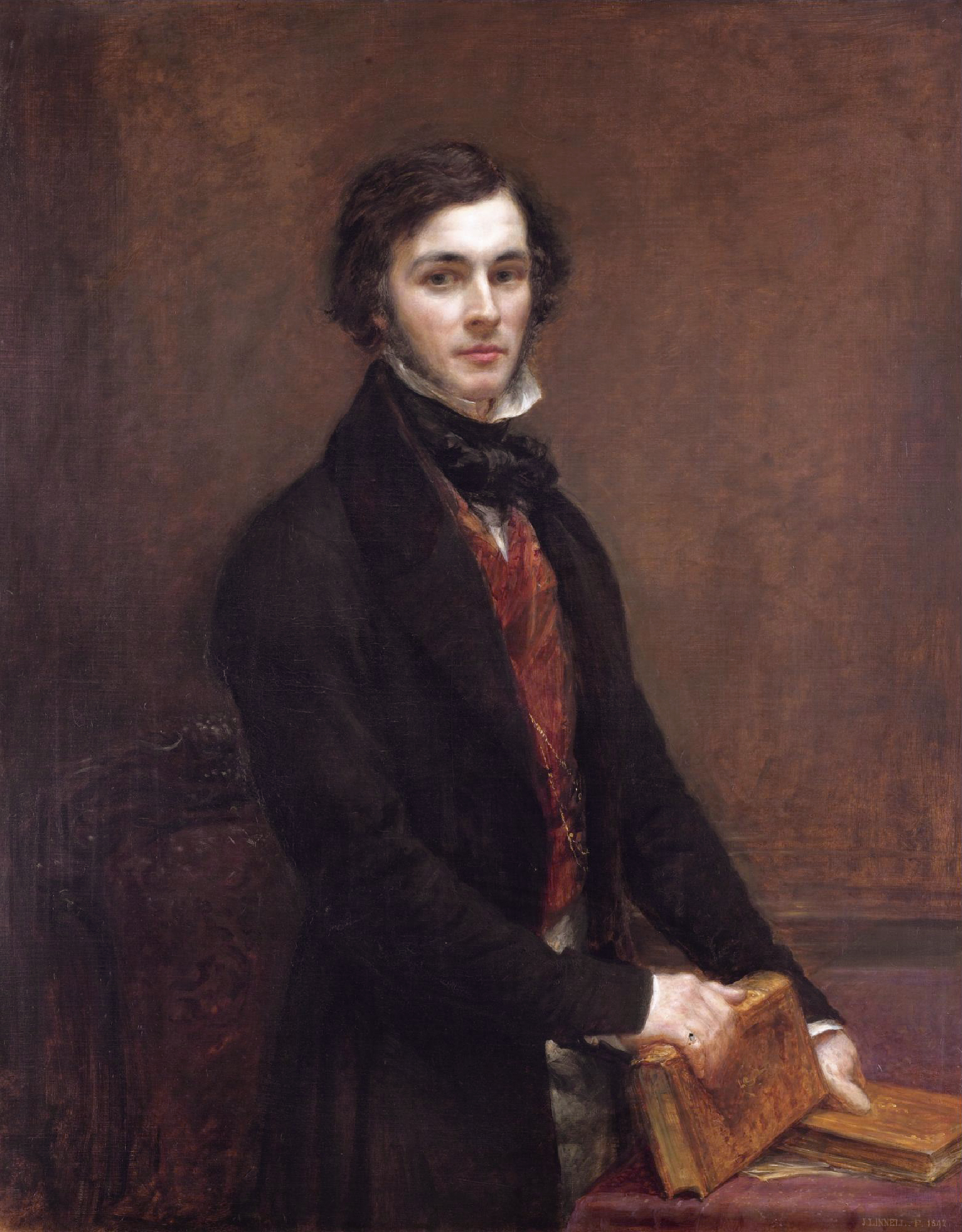
Portrait of William Coningham by John Linnell

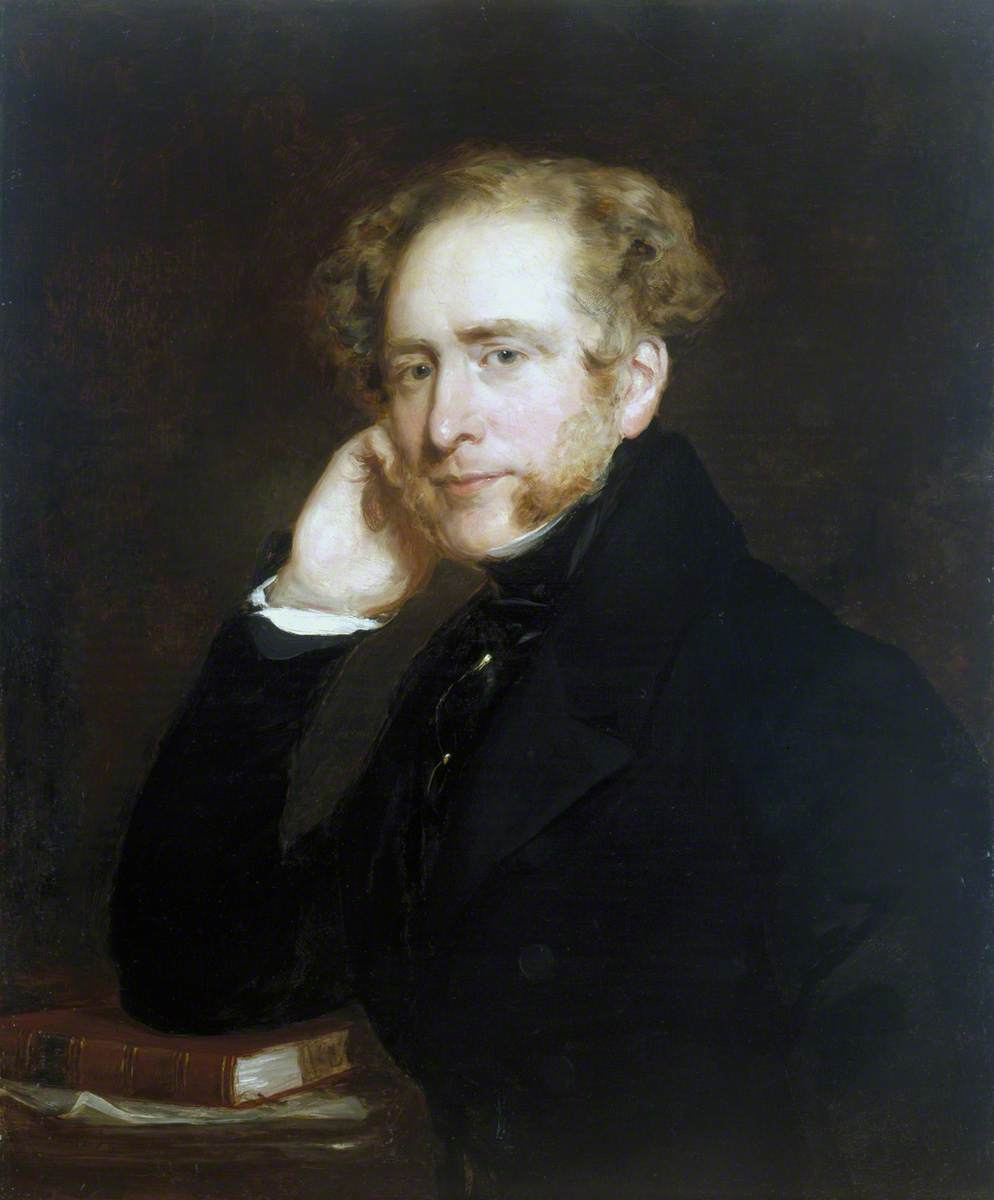
Portrait of Alexander Nasmyth by Francis Grant

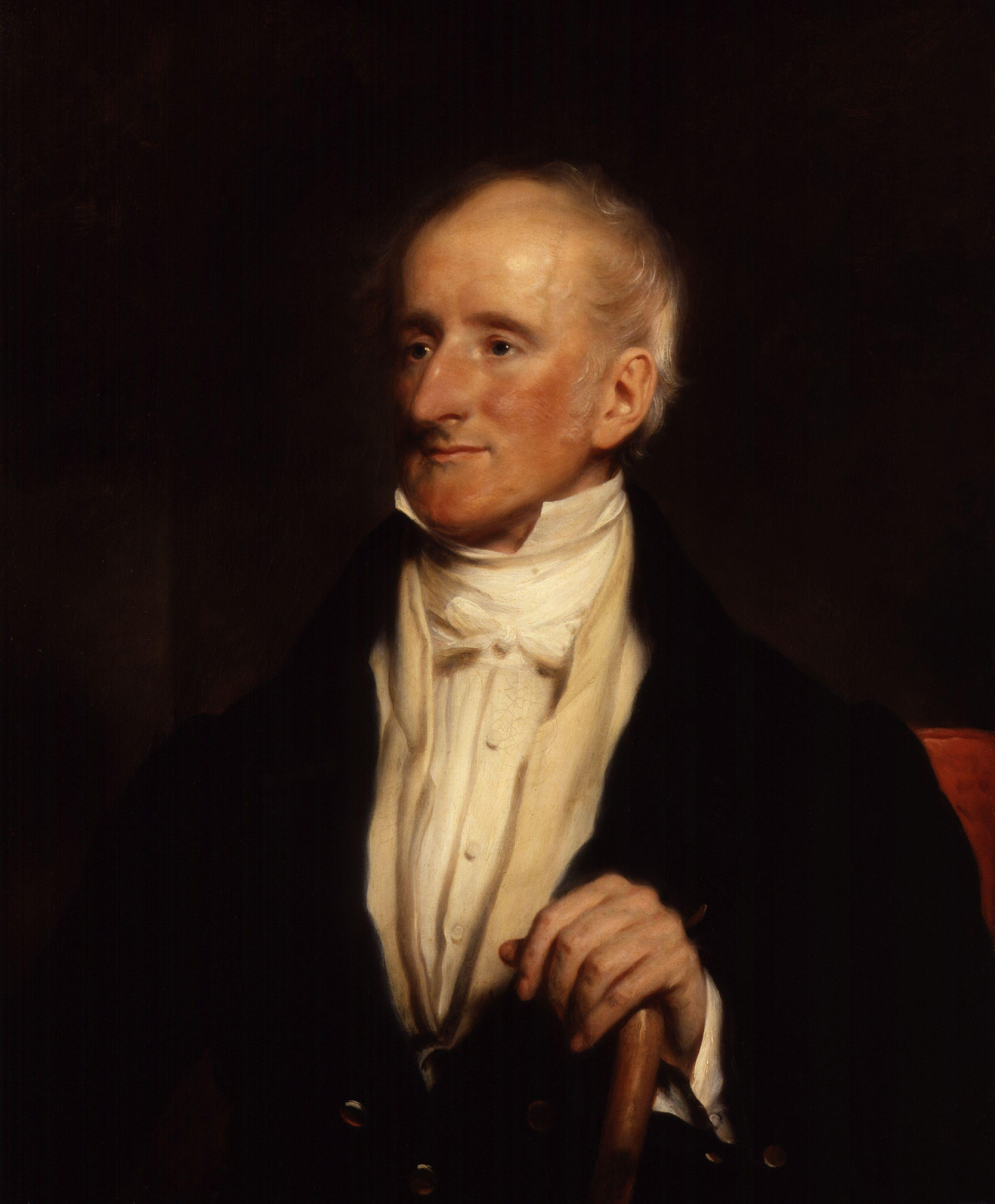
Portrait of Sir Francis Burdett by Martin Archer Shee

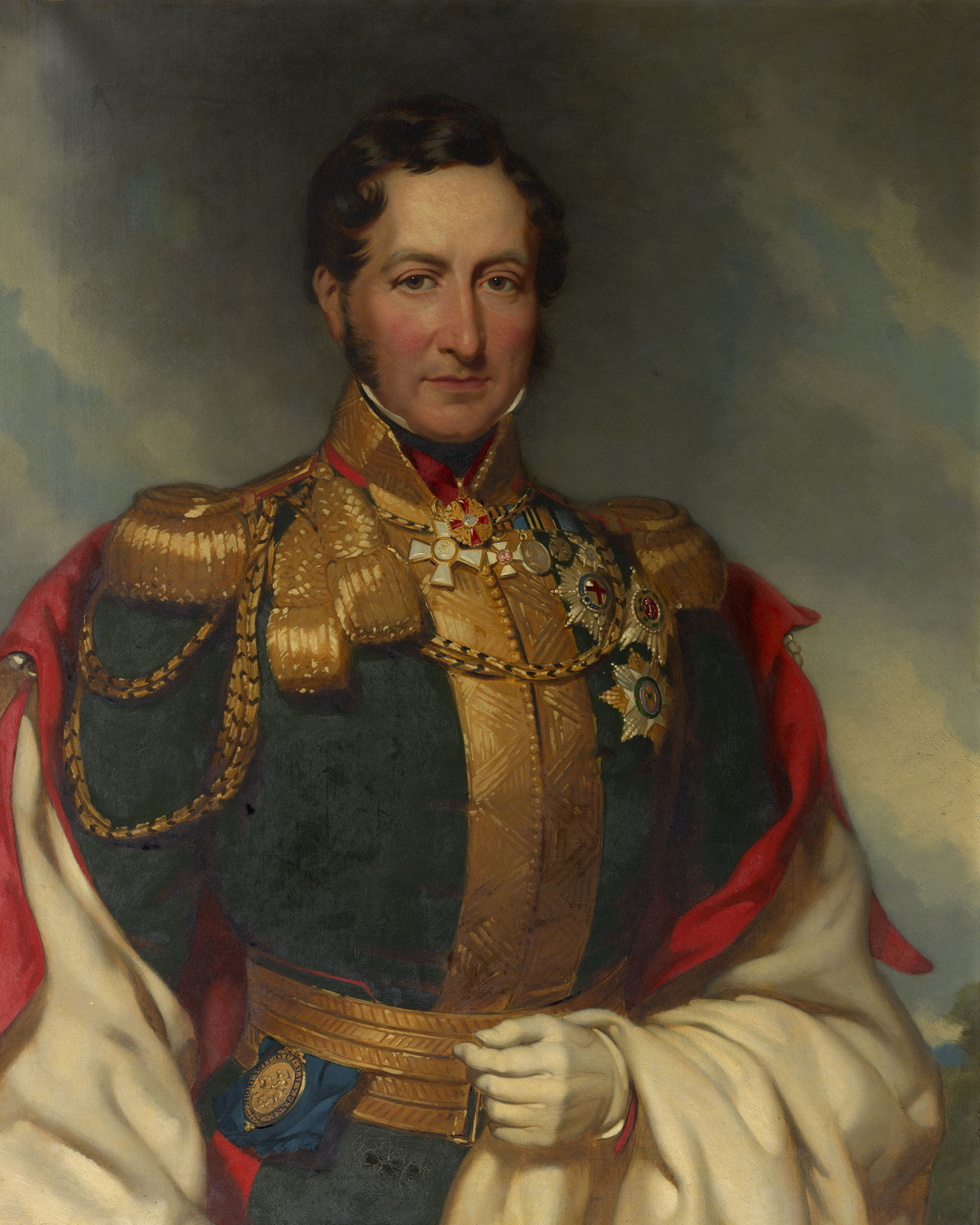
Portrait of the Duke of Saxe-Coburg-Gotha by John Lucas

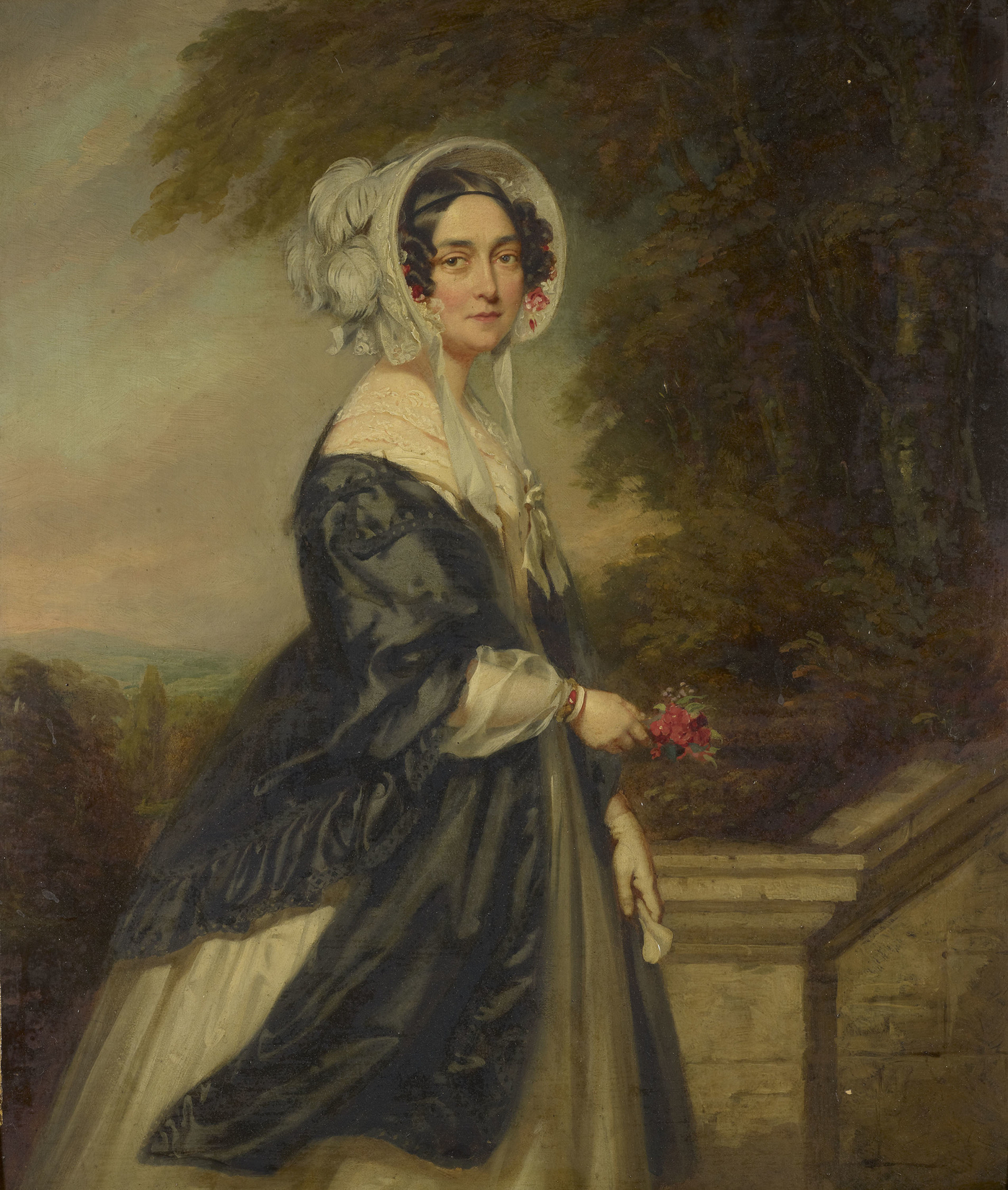
Portrait of Victoria, Duchess of Kent by John Lucas

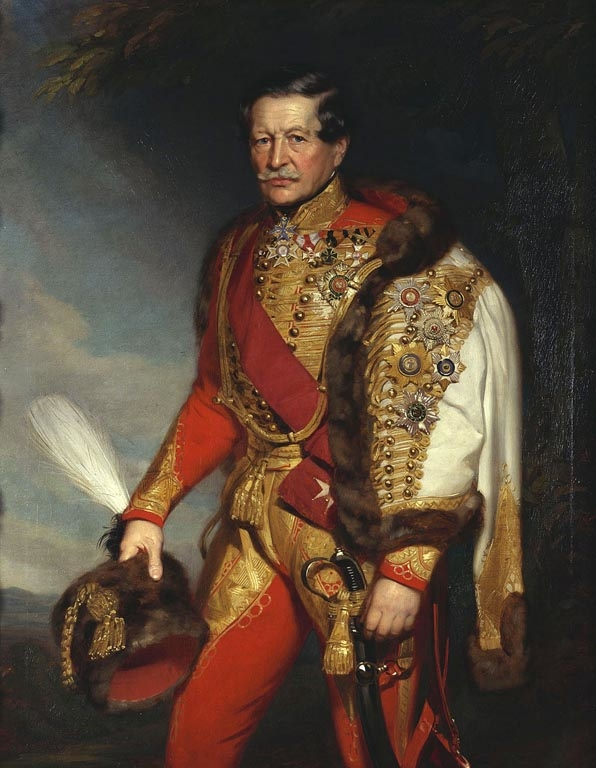
Portrait of Count Mensdorff-Pouilly by John Lucas

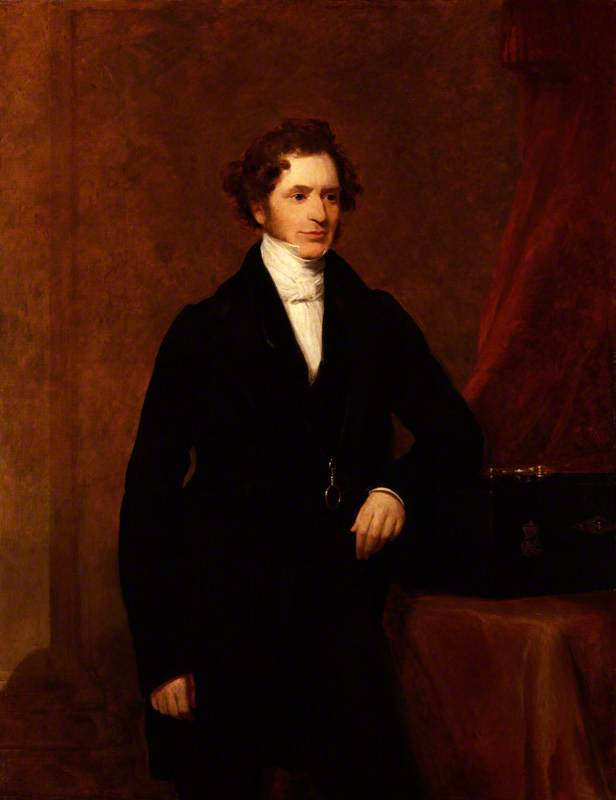
Portrait of the Earl of Derby by Frederick Richard Say

== See also ==
- Royal Academy Exhibition of 1843, the previous year's exhibition
- Salon of 1844, a contemporary French exhibition held at the Louvre in Paris

== Bibliography ==
- Bailey, Anthony. J.M.W. Turner: Standing in the Sun. Tate Enterprises Ltd, 2013.
- Hamilton, James. Turner - A Life. Sceptre, 1998.
- Ormond, Richard. Sir Edwin Landseer. Philadelphia Museum of Art, 1981.
- Kennedy, Ian G. & Treuherz, Julian. The Railway: Art in the Age of Steam. Yale University Press, 2008.
- Roe, Sonia. Oil Paintings in Public Ownership in the Victoria and Albert Museum. Public Catalogue Foundation, 2008.
- Shanes, Eric. The Life and Masterworks of J.M.W. Turner. Parkstone International, 2012.
