= The Morning after the Wreck =

Painting by Clarkson Stanfield

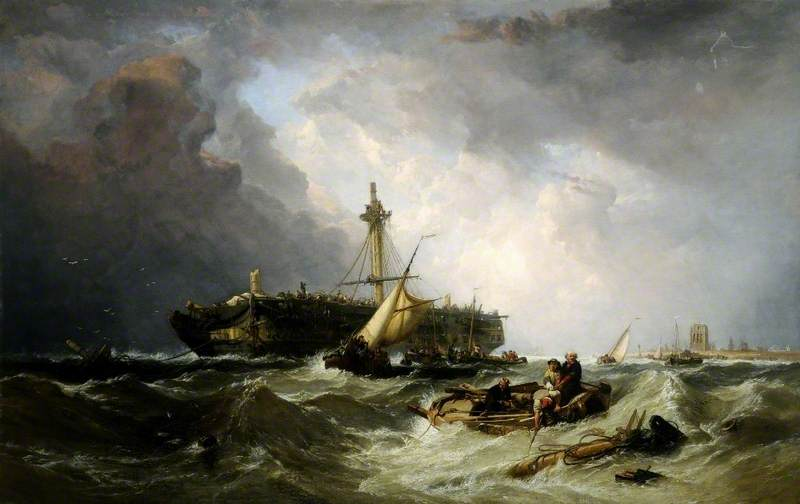
- Artist: Clarkson Stanfield
- Year: 1844
- Type: Oil on canvas, seascape painting
- Dimensions: 153 cm × 232.4 cm (60 in × 91.5 in)
- Location: Graves Art Gallery, Sheffield

The Morning after the Wreck is an 1844 oil-on-canvas painting by the British artist Clarkson Stanfield. It depicts an East Indiaman wrecked on the Eastern Scheldt in the province of Zeeland in the Netherlands.

The work was first purchased, and possibly commissioned by Elhanan Bicknell. It was displayed at the Royal Academy Exhibition of 1844 at the National Gallery in London, under the longer title The Day after the Wreck. A Dutch East Indiaman on Shore in the Ooster Scheldt: Zierkizee in the Distance and again at the annual exhibition of the Royal Society of Artists in 1845 Today it is in the collection of the Graves Art Gallery in Sheffield, having been acquired in 1929. A separate watercolour version also exists.

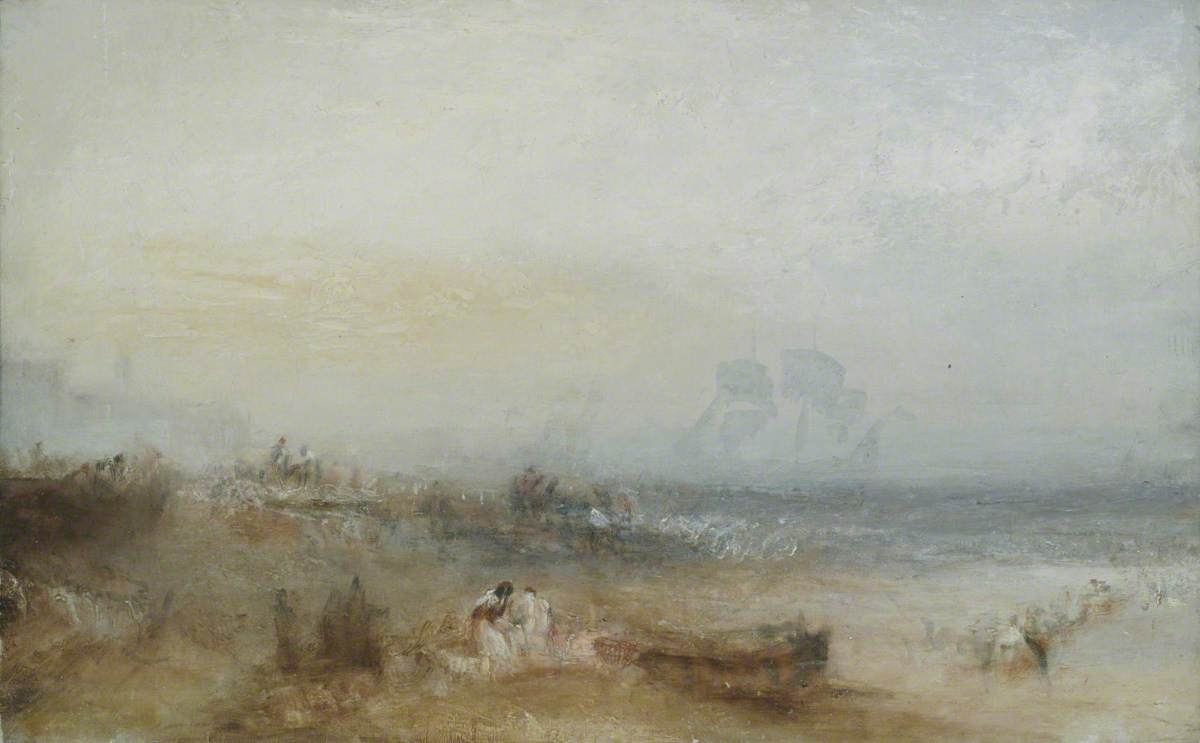
The Morning After the Wreck, an unrelated painting by J.M.W. Turner

It should not be confused with a painting of the same title by J.M.W. Turner, a friend and contemporary of Stanfield.

== Bibliography ==
- Van der Merwe, Pieter & Took, Roger. The Spectacular career of Clarkson Stanfield. Tyne and Wear County Council Museums, 1979.
- Wright, Christopher, Gordon, Catherine May & Smith, Mary Peskett. British and Irish Paintings in Public Collections: An Index of British and Irish Oil Paintings by Artists Born Before 1870 in Public and Institutional Collections in the United Kingdom and Ireland. Yale University Press, 2006.
