= Venice, Maria della Salute =

Painting by J. M. W. Turner

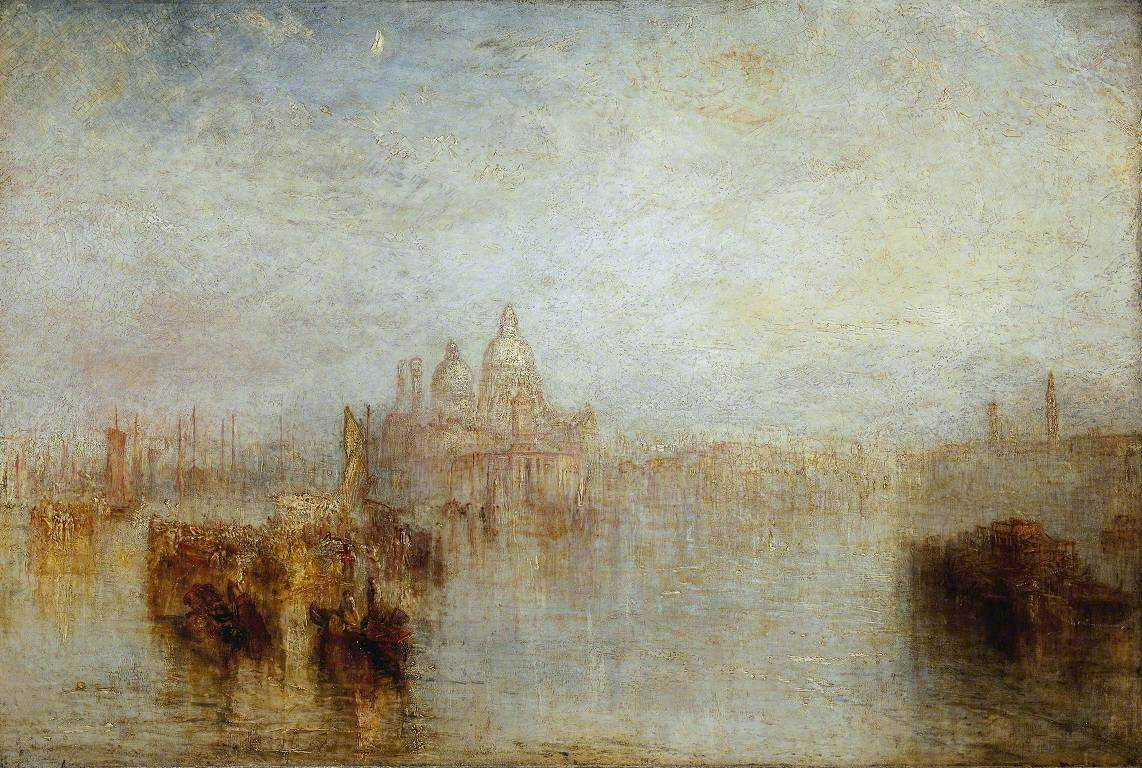
- Artist: J. M. W. Turner
- Year: 1844
- Type: Oil on canvas, landscape painting
- Dimensions: 61.3 cm × 92.1 cm (24.1 in × 36.3 in)
- Location: Tate Britain, London
- Website: tate.org.uk/...n00539

Venice, Maria della Salute is an 1844 landscape painting by the British artist J.M.W. Turner. It depicts a view of Venice with the Santa Maria della Salute in the centre, with the Dogana beyond it and the Giudecca to the left and Zecca to the right. It was one of a large number of paintings of Venice that Turner produced in the 1830s and 1840s. The picture was displayed at the Royal Academy Exhibition of 1844 at the National Gallery in London. It subsequently formed part of the Turner Bequest of 1856 and is now in the collection of the Tate Britain in Pimlico.

== See also ==
- List of paintings by J. M. W. Turner

== Bibliography ==
- Bailey, Anthony. J.M.W. Turner: Standing in the Sun. Tate Enterprises, 2013
- Blatt, Sidney J. & Blatt, Ethel. Continuity and Change in Art: The Development of Modes of Representation. Routledge, 2014.
- Costello, Leo. J.M.W. Turner and the Subject of History. Routledge, 2017.
- Finberg, Alexander Joseph. In Venice with Turner. Cotswold Gallery, 1930.
- Hamilton, James (ed.) Turner and Italy. National Galleries of Scotland, 2009.
