= 1843 in art =

Events from the year 1843 in art.

== Events ==
- 8 May – The Royal Academy Exhibition of 1843 opens at the National Gallery in London.
- August – Richard Dadd, taken to the country by his family to recover from a mental breakdown, commits patricide.
- The Hill & Adamson photographic partnership is formed in Edinburgh.

== Publications ==
- Charles Robert Leslie – Memoirs of the Life of John Constable
- John Ruskin – Modern Painters

== Works ==
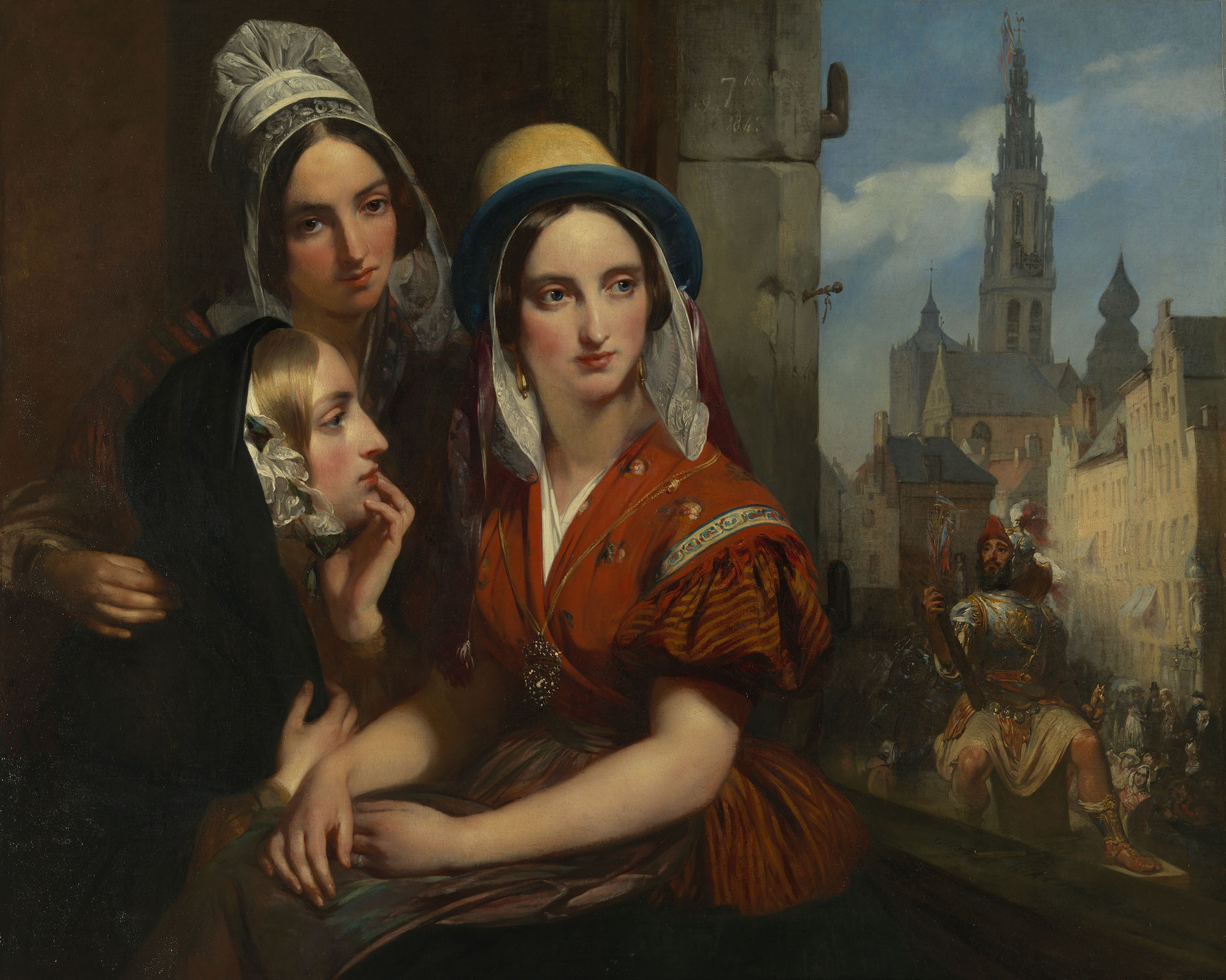
Souvenirs of Antwerp by Gustaf Wappers

- Berlin Peace Column
- Madison Square Fountain, New York City
- Martin Archer Shee – Portrait of Sir Francis Burdett
- François Bouchot – Napoleon Signing His Abdication at Fontainebleau
- Théodore Chassériau – The Two Sisters
- Gustave Courbet – The Desperate Man (self-portrait)
- Paul Delaroche – Charles de Rémusat
- William Etty – Musidora: The Bather 'At the Doubtful Breeze Alarmed' (first version)
- Julius Exner – Fra Kunstakademiets figursal ("From the Art Academy's Plaster Cast Collection")
- George Hayter – The House of Commons, 1833
- Eugène Lami – The Arrival of Queen Victoria at the Château d'Eu
- Charles Landseer – The Dying Warrior
- Edwin Landseer – Windsor Castle in Modern Times
- Paul Falconer Poole – Solomon Eagle exhorting the People to Repentance during the Plague of 1665
- Hiram Powers – The Greek Slave
- Richard Redgrave – Going into Service
- David Roberts – The Gate of Metawaley
- Hendrik Scheffer – Entry of Joan of Arc into Liberated Orleans
  - J. M. W. Turner
  - Light and Colour (Goethe's Theory) – The Morning after the Deluge – Moses Writing the Book of Genesis
  - St Benedetto, Looking Towards Fusina
  - The Opening of the Wallhalla
  - The Sun of Venice Going to Sea
- Peter von Hess – The Battle of Borodino
- Horace Vernet – Arabs Travelling in the Desert
- Gustaf Wappers – Souvenirs of Antwerp
- Robert Walter Weir – Embarkation of the Pilgrims
- Franz Xaver Winterhalter
  - Leonilla Bariatinskaia Princess of Sayn Wittgenstein Sayn (Getty Museum, Los Angeles)
  - Queen Victoria (British Royal Collection)

== Births ==
- March 3 – Aleksander Sochaczewski, Polish painter (died 1923)
- March 14 – Alexander Louis Leloir, French painter (died 1884)
- April 4 – William Henry Jackson, American explorer, photographer and painter (died 1942)
- April 8 – Howard Roberts, Philadelphia-based sculptor (died 1900)
- June 16 – Adolf Waldinger, painter from Osijek, Croatia (died 1904)
- July 19 – Lucy Madox Brown, English painter (died 1894)
- September 6 – Flaxman Charles John Spurrell, English archaeologist and photographer (died 1915)
- September 25 – Maria Spanò, Italian painter (died 1880)
- November 16 – Louise Jopling, English painter (died 1933)
- November 29 – Gertrude Jekyll, English garden designer (died 1932)
- date unknown
  - Owon (Jang Seung-eop), Korean painter (died 1897)
  - Giulio Salviati, Italian glassmaker and mosaicist (died 1898)

== Deaths ==
- January 17 – Abraham Raimbach, English engraver (born 1776)
- January 20 – William Sawrey Gilpin, English watercolour painter (born 1762)
- Between February 21 and 28 – Alexander Carse, Scottish genre painter (born 1770)
- March 19 – Alexander Varnek, Russian portrait painter (born 1782)
- April 13 – Georgije Bakalović, Serbian painter (born 1786)
- July 9 – Washington Allston, painter, the "American Titian" (born 1779)
- July 12 – Josiah Wedgwood II, pottery owner, son of Josiah Wedgwood (born 1769)
- July 23 – Antonín Mánes, Czech painter (born 1784)
- August 12 – Jean-Pierre Cortot, French sculptor (born 1787)
- October 24 – Antoine Berjon, French painter and designer (born 1754)
- November 10 – John Trumbull, American painter (born 1756)
- November 27 – Vojtěch Benedikt Juhn, Czech painter and engraver (born 1779)
- date unknown
  - Jean-Eugène-Charles Alberti, Dutch painter working primarily in Paris (born 1777)
  - Hasegawa Settan, Japanese painter and wood sculptor during the late Edo period (born unknown)
