= The Gateway to the Great Temple at Baalbec =

Painting by David Roberts

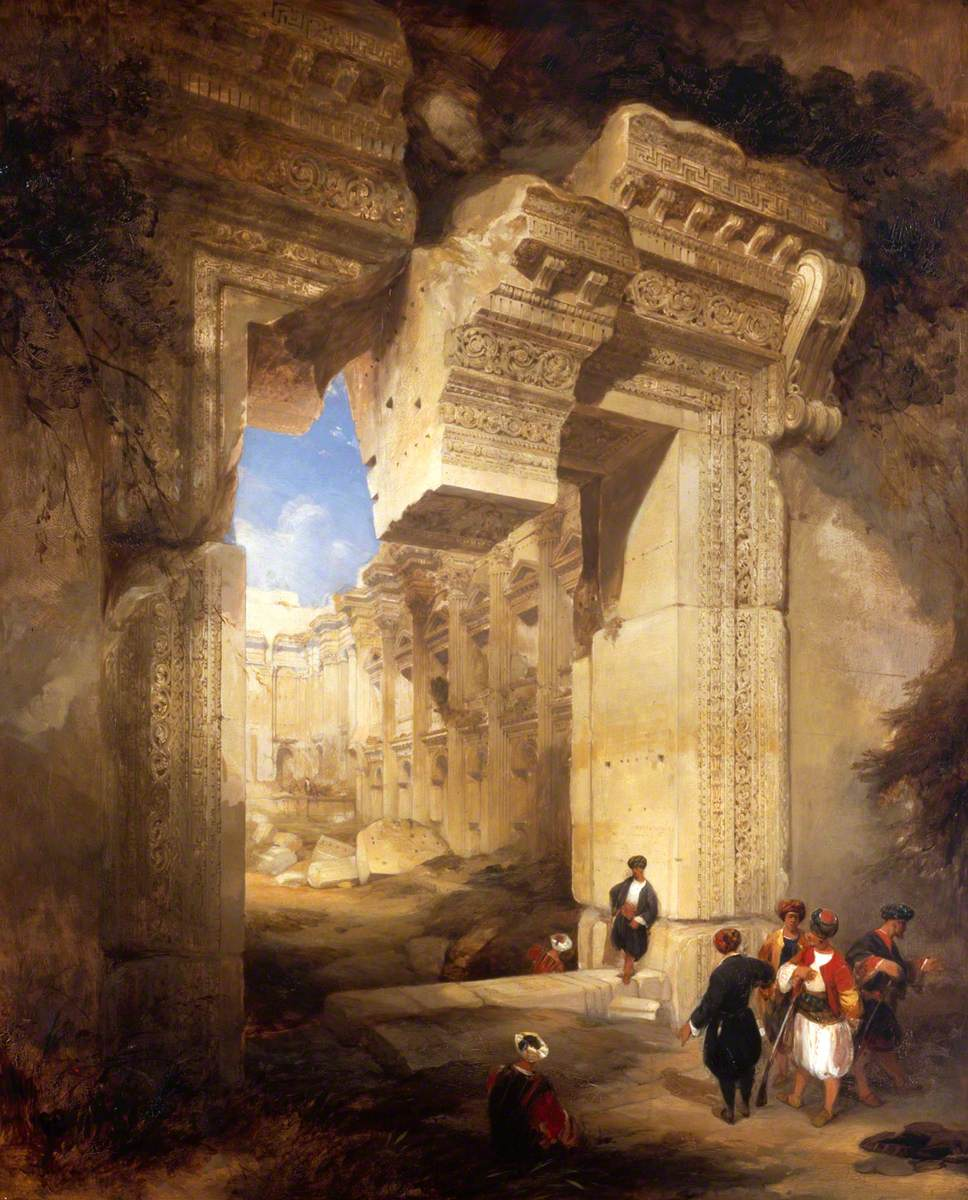
- Artist: David Roberts
- Year: 1841
- Type: Oil on panel, landscape painting
- Dimensions: 75.8 cm × 61.8 cm (29.8 in × 24.3 in)
- Location: Royal Academy of Arts, London

The Gateway to the Great Temple at Baalbec is an oil on canvas by the British artist David Roberts, from 1841. It depicts the ruined ancient Roman temple complex at the city of Baalbek in Lebanon. Roberts had visited the site in 1839 during his first tour of the Middle East. He added figures in local costume to help emphasise the grand scale of the buildings.

The work was displayed at the Royal Academy Exhibition of 1843 at the National Gallery in London. Roberts was elected a full member of the academy and presented this painting as his diploma work.

== Bibliography ==
- Guiterman, Helen. David Roberts, 1796-1864, Artist, Adventurer. Scottish Arts Council, 1981.
- Sim, Katherine. David Roberts R.A., 1796–1864: A Biography. Quartet Books, 1984.
