= Royal Academy Exhibition of 1843 =

1843 art exhibition in London

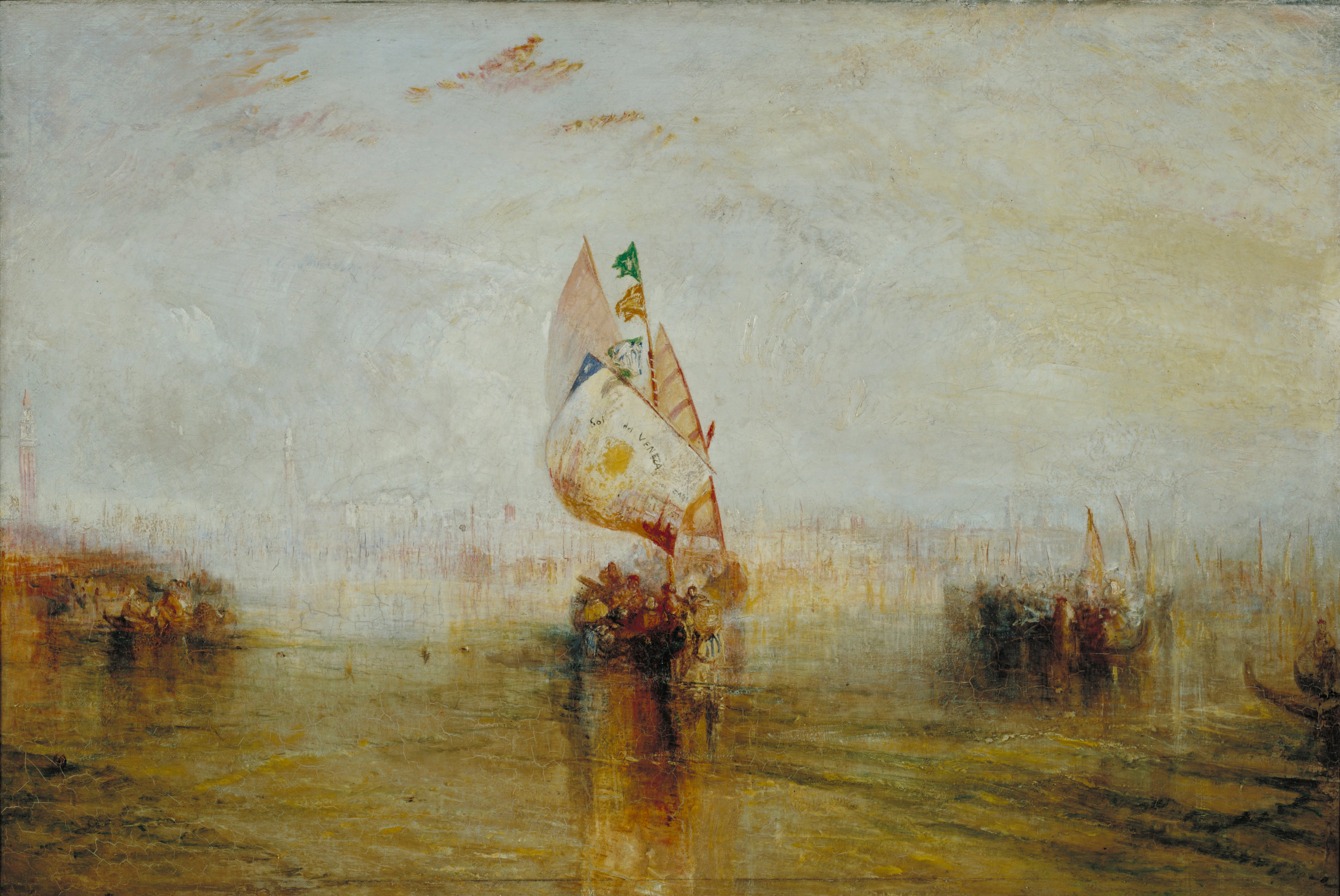
The Sun of Venice Going to Sea by J. M. W. Turner

The Royal Academy Exhibition of 1843 was an art exhibition organised by the British Royal Academy of Arts. It was staged between 8 May and 29 July 1843 at the National Gallery in London, the Academy's home since its move from Somerset House in 1837.

The exhibition took place the same year as the Fine Arts Commission was holding a public contest for works designed for the new Houses of Parliament which were rebuilt following a major fire the previous decade. This drew the efforts of some artists away from the exhibition although many painters submitted works to both. The exhibition featured several representations of the young Queen Victoria, including portraits by the President of the Royal Academy Martin Archer Shee and the future president Francis Grant. In addition Charles Robert Leslie exhibited Queen Victoria Receiving the Sacrament at her Coronation, depicting a scene from her 1838 coronation at Westminster Abbey.

By this stage in his career J. M. W. Turner was the leading British artist, following the deaths of contemporaries such as John Constable and David Wilkie. However the paintings he submitted to the Academy reflected his developing experiments with light and colour, in a style that anticipated impressionism later in the century. Amongst these works was The Sun of Venice Going to Sea, a work that appreciated by the critic John Ruskin.

William Etty submitted the first of four versions that he produced by 1846 of The Bather based on James Thompson's poem Summer. David Roberts displayed The Gateway to the Great Temple at Baalbec, one of a number of oils paintings he produced based on his travels through the Middle East.

== Gallery ==
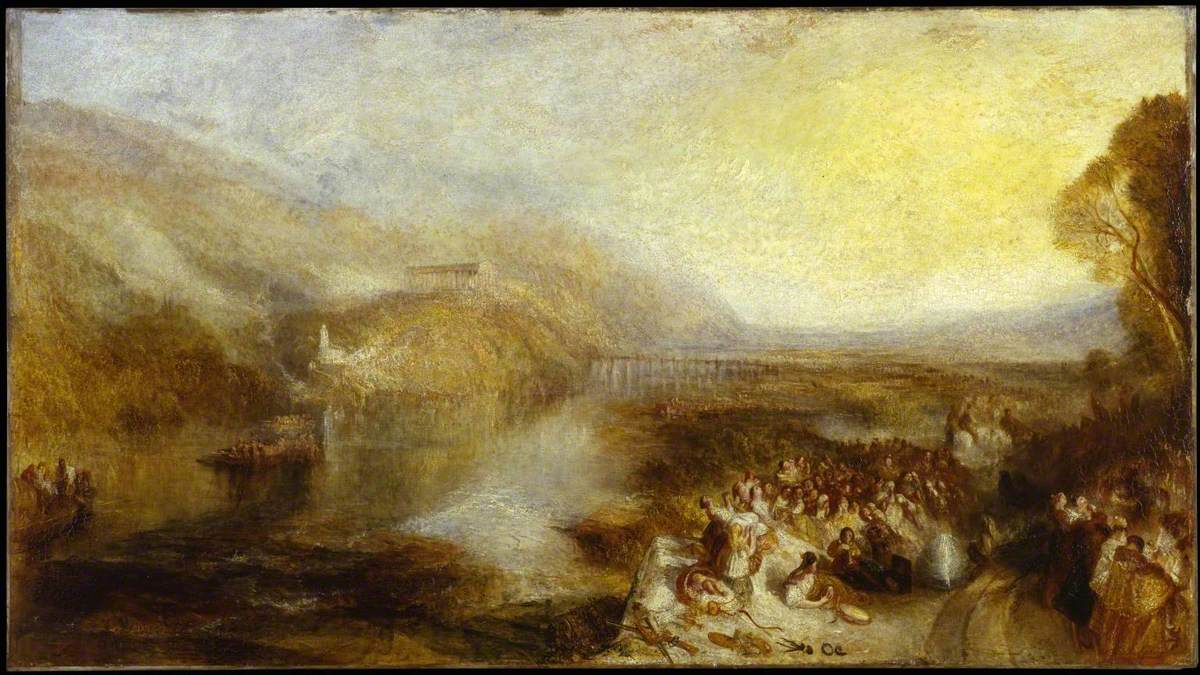
The Opening of the Wallhalla by J. M. W. Turner

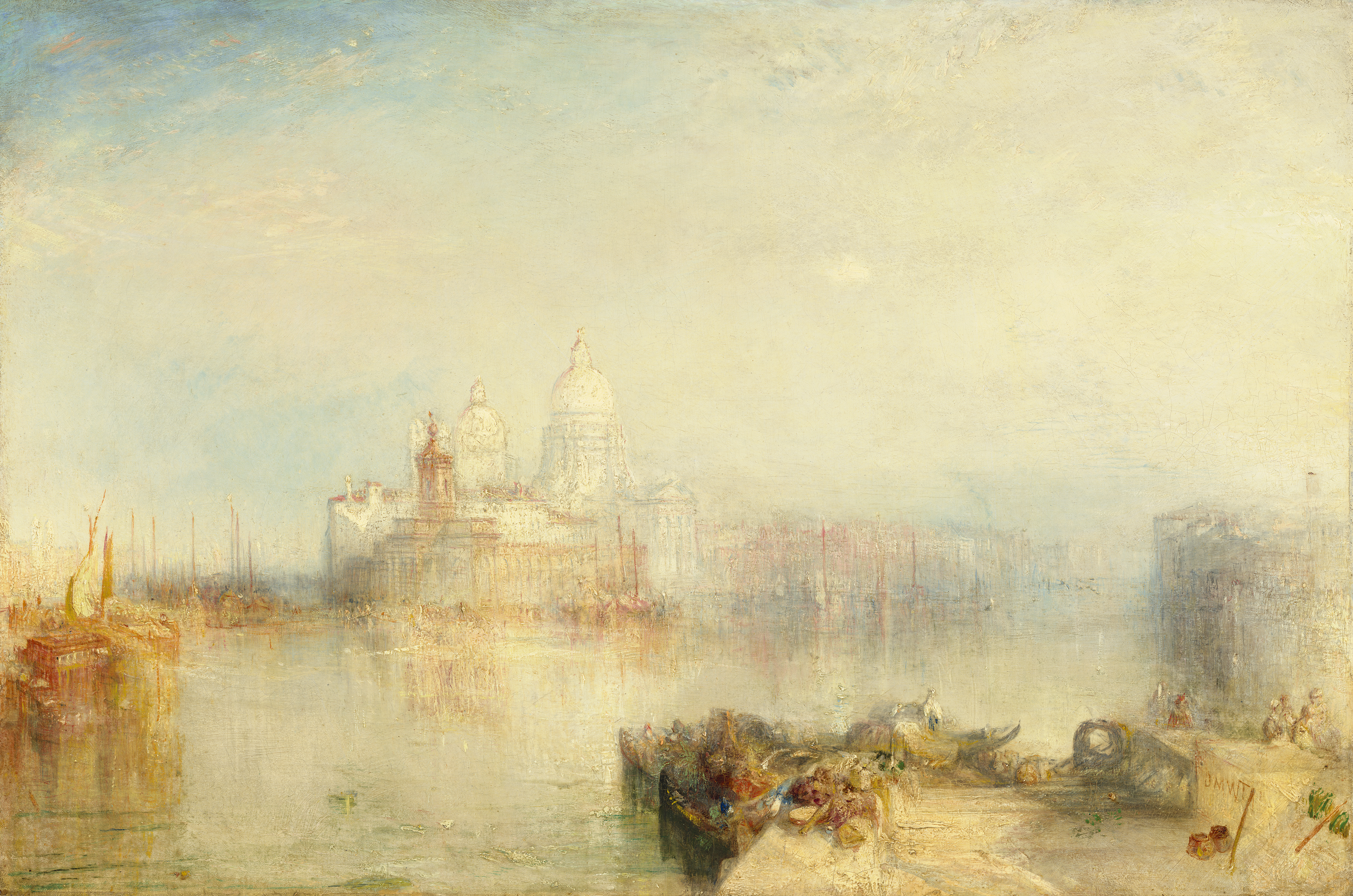
The Dogana and Santa Maria della Salute, Venice by J. M. W. Turner

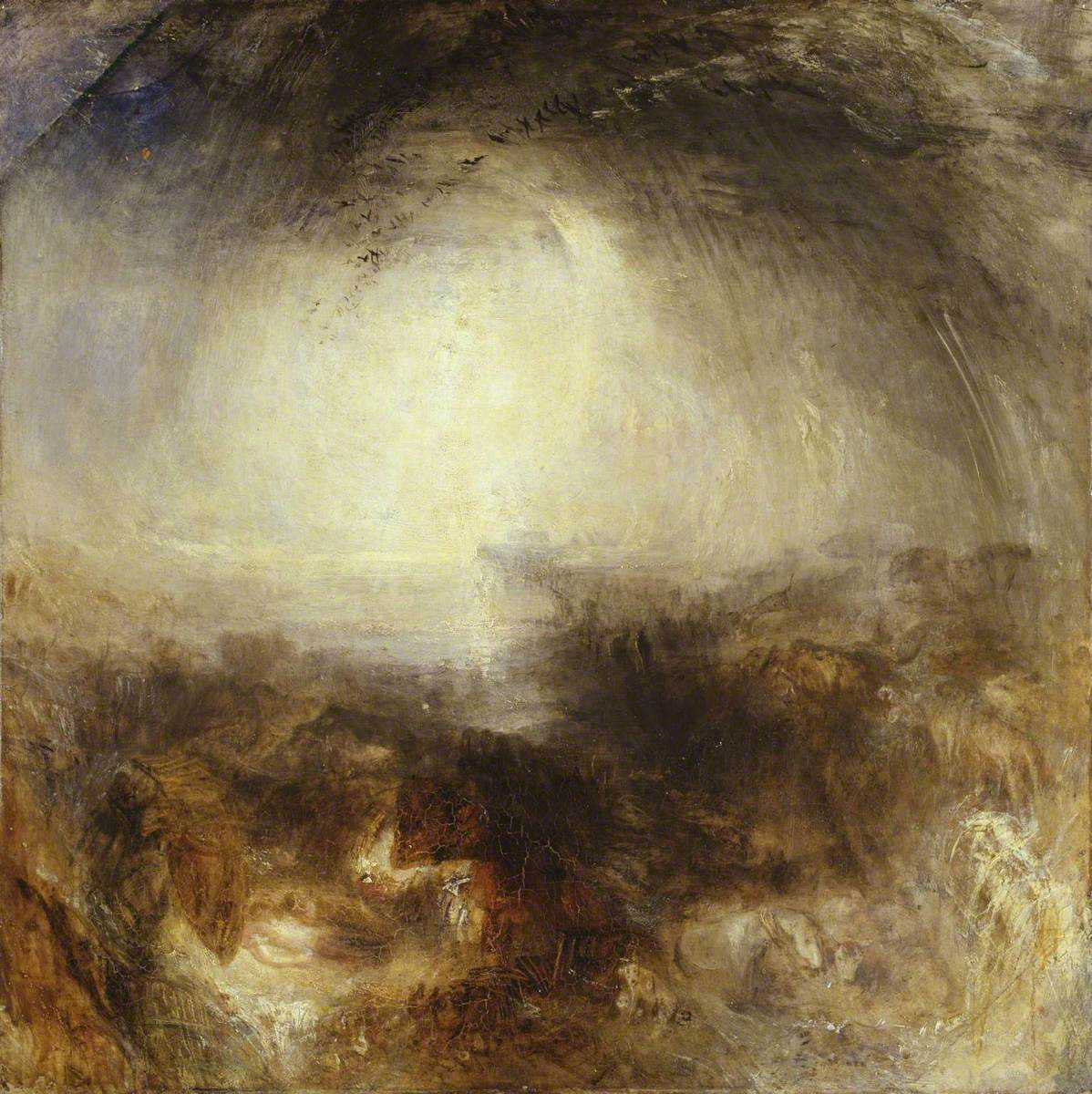
Shade and Darkness - the Evening of the Deluge by J. M. W. Turner

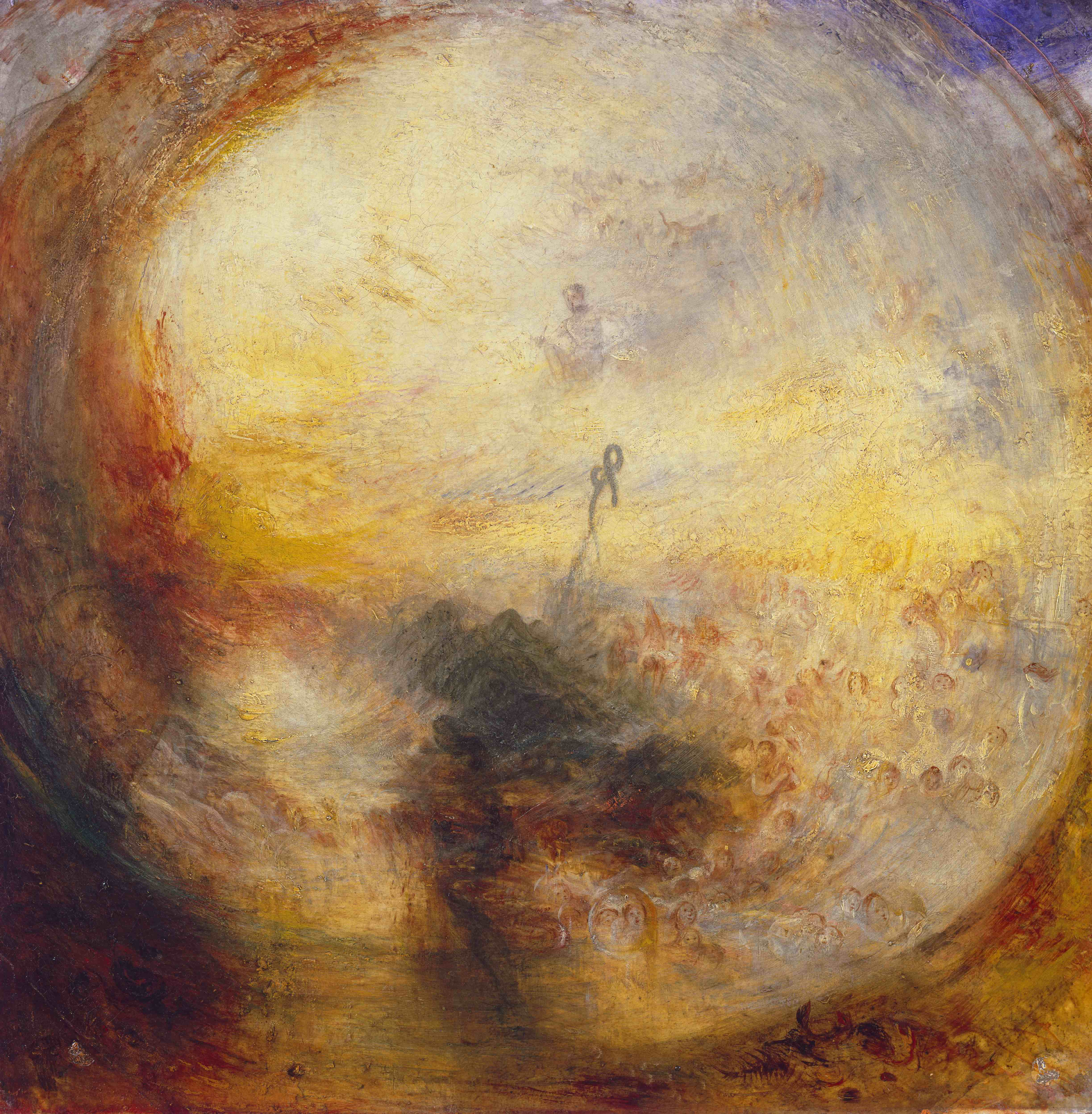
Light and Colour (Goethe's Theory) by J. M. W. Turner

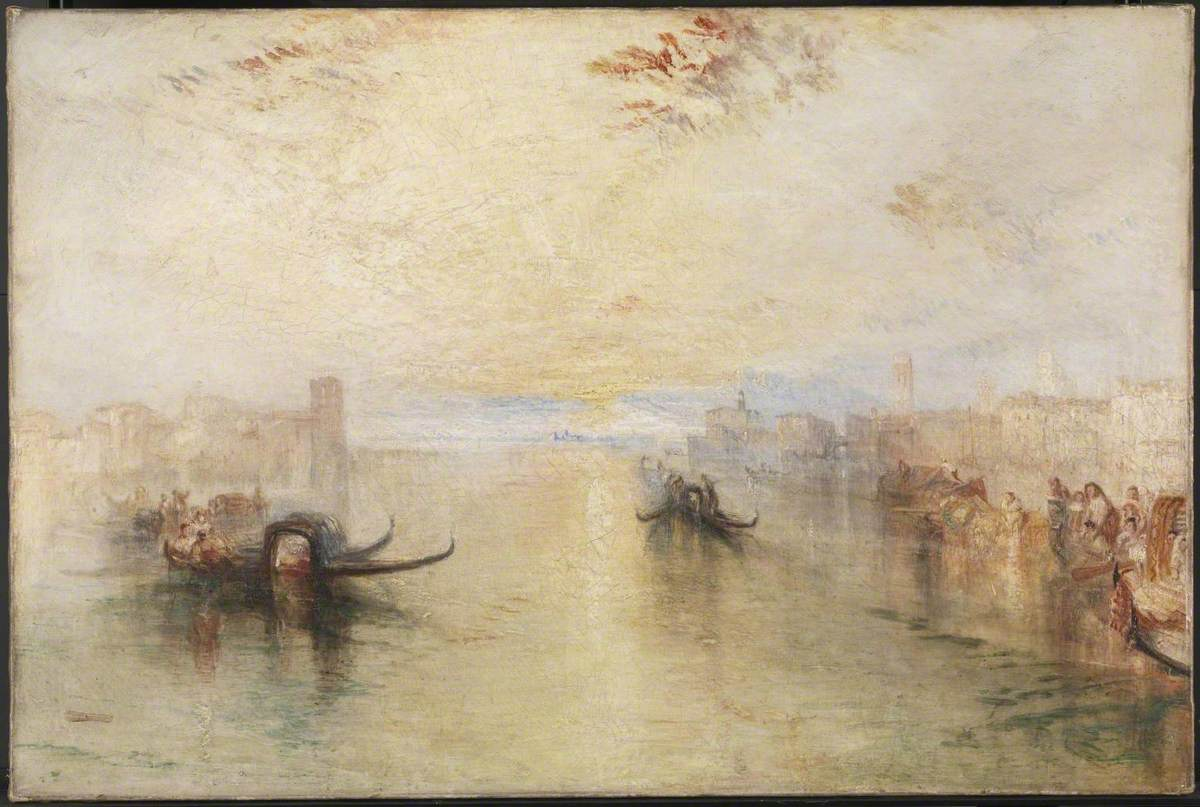
St Benedetto, Looking Towards Fusina by J. M. W. Turner

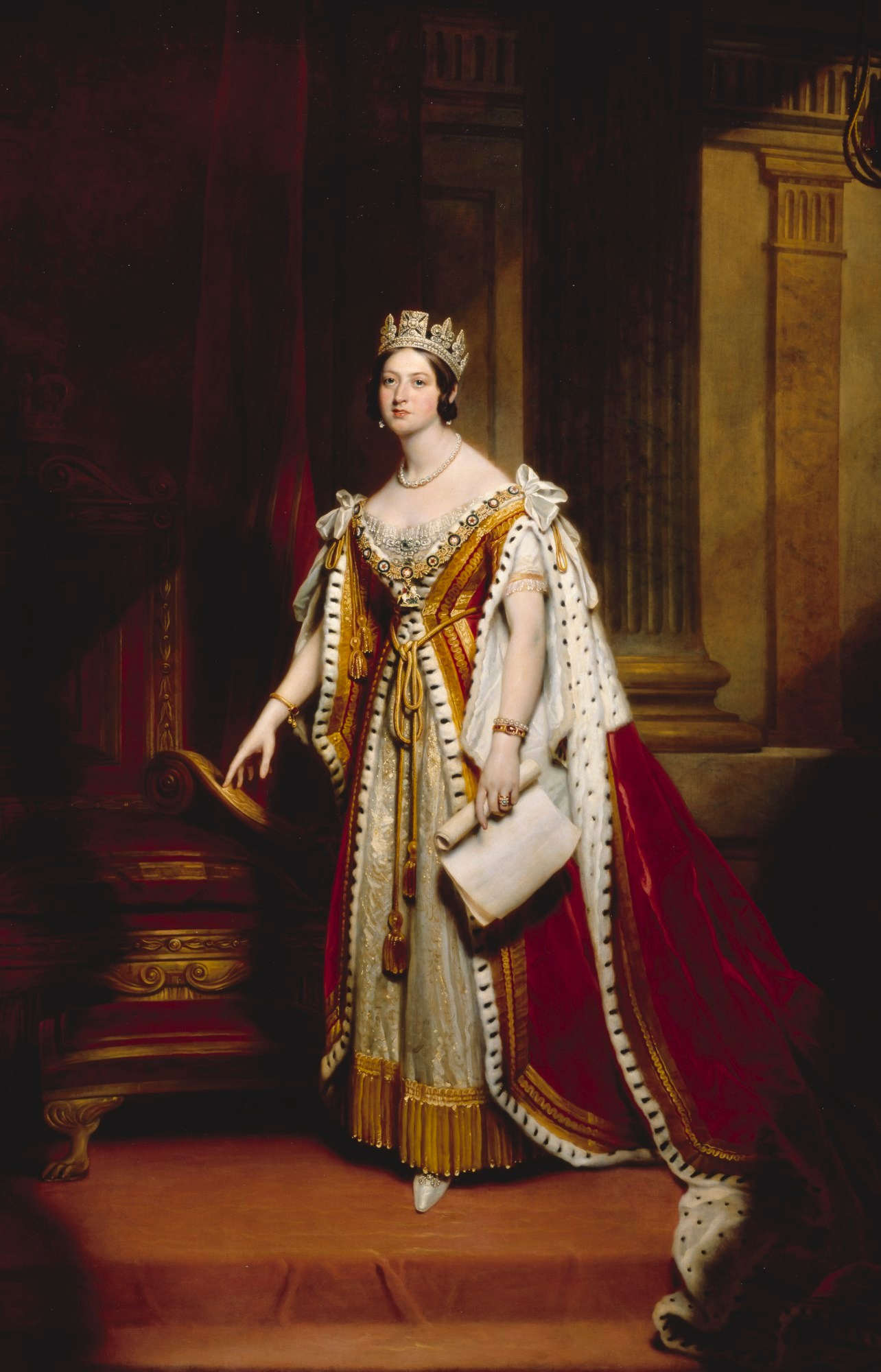
Portrait of Queen Victoria by Martin Archer Shee

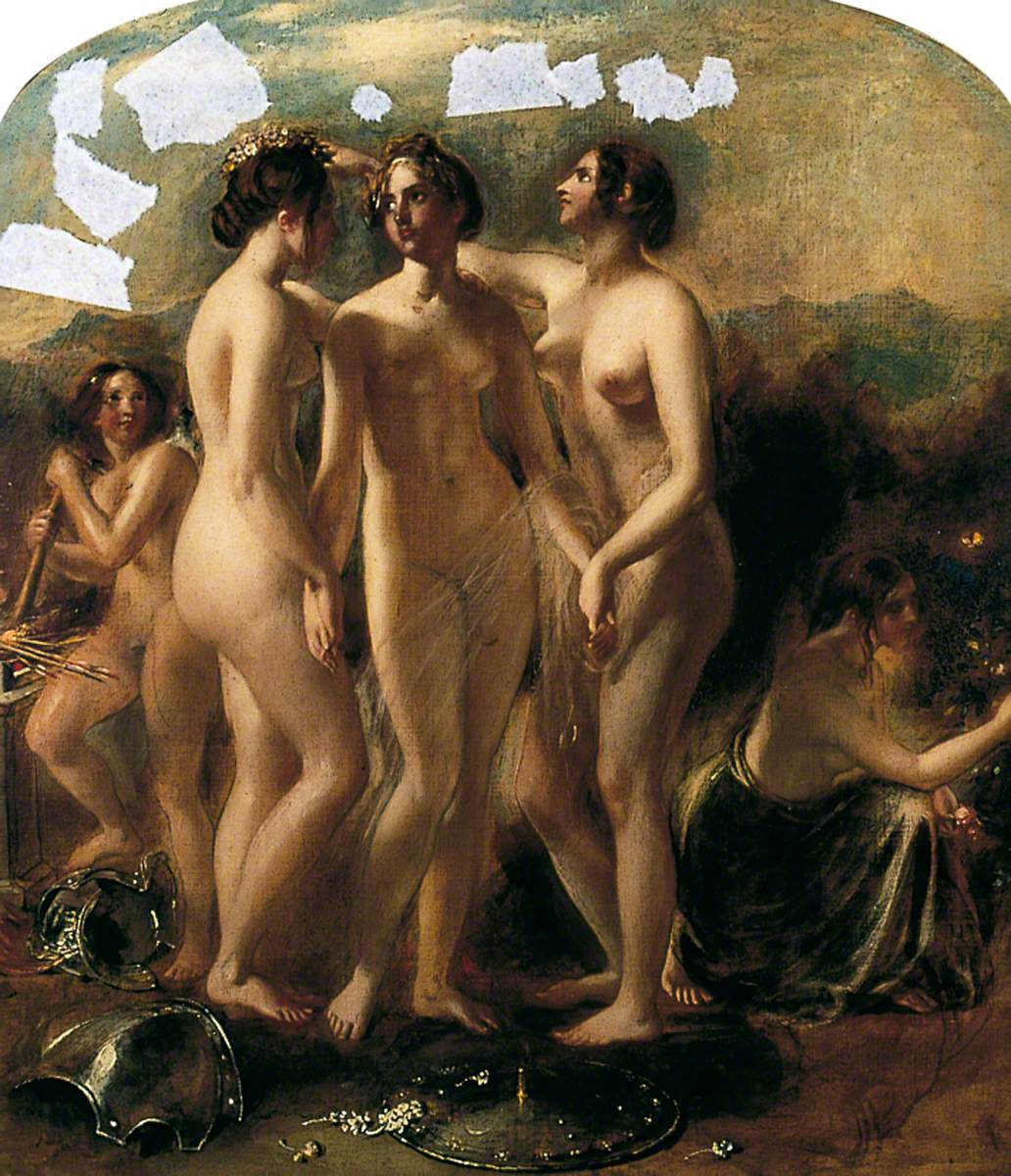
The Graces: Cupid and Psyche by William Etty

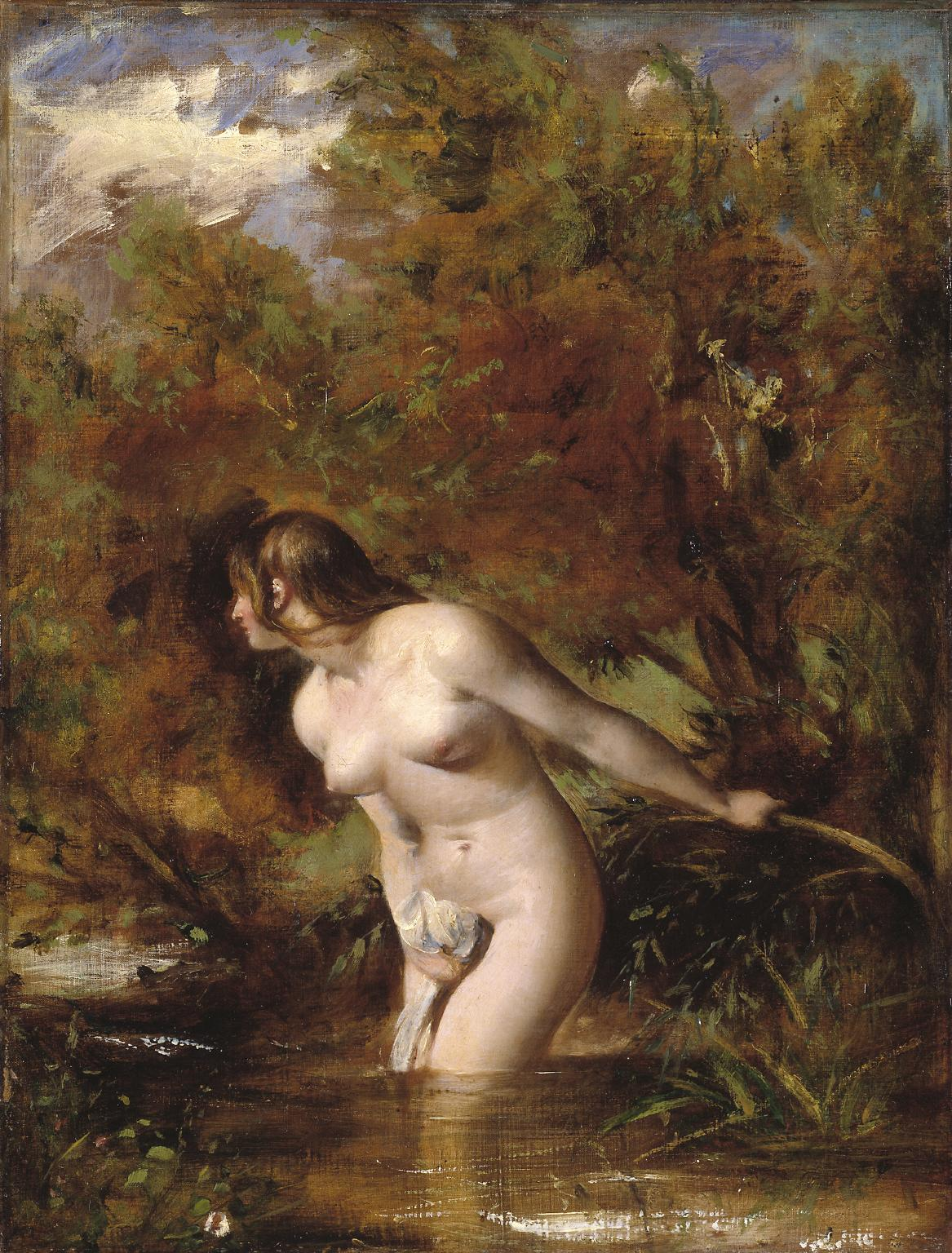
The Bather by William Etty

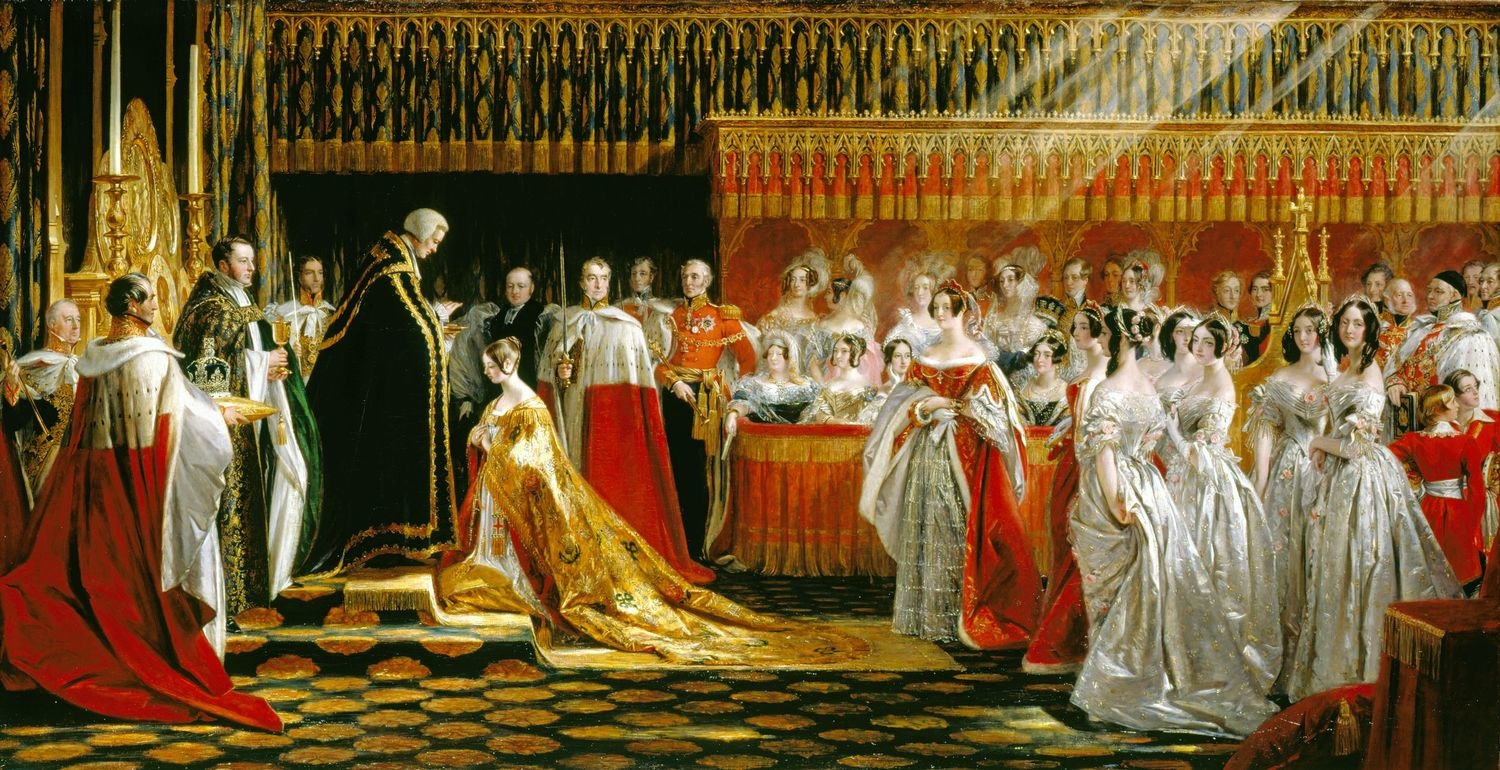
Queen Victoria Receiving the Sacrament at her Coronation by Charles Robert Leslie

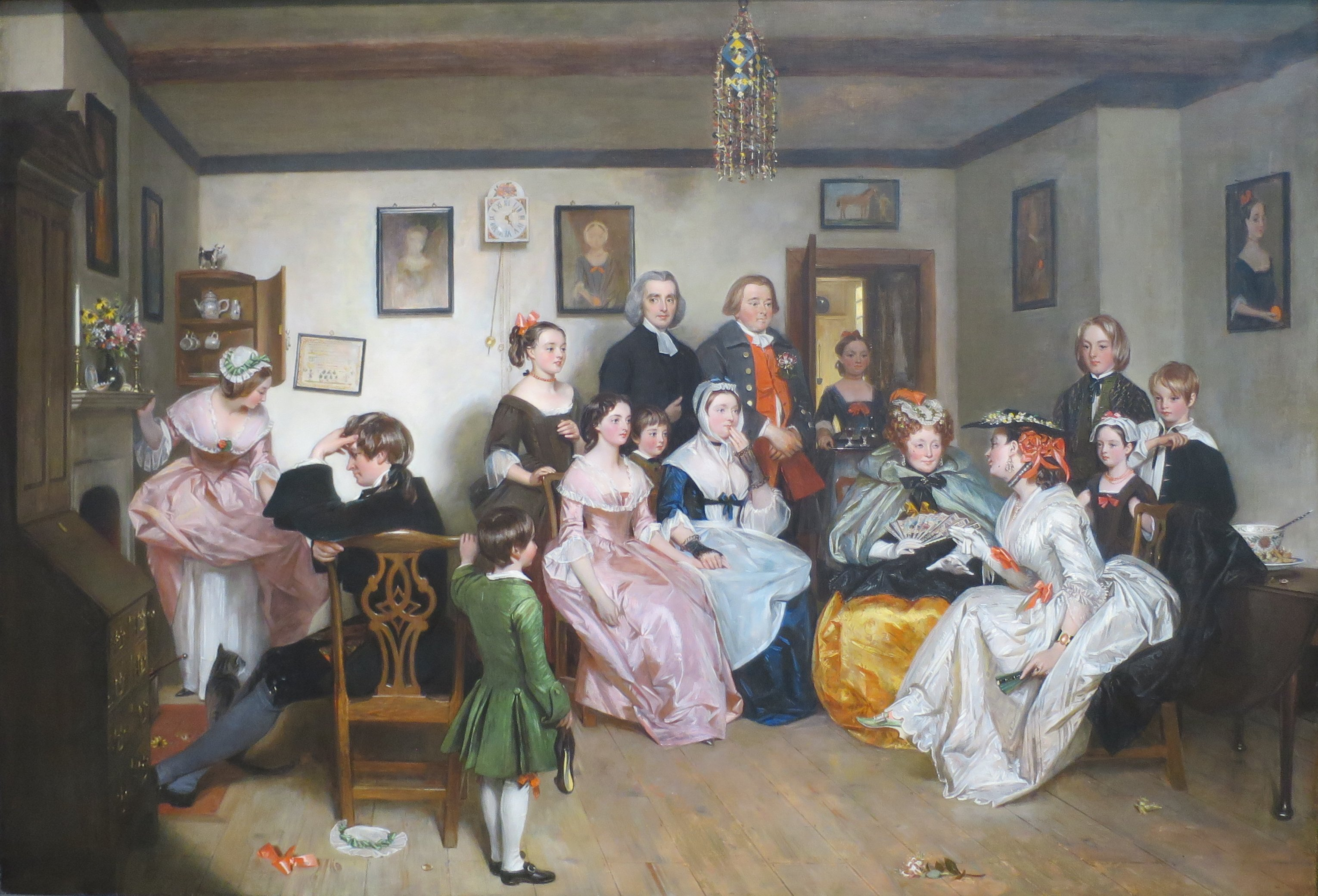
The Vicar of Wakefield by Charles Robert Leslie

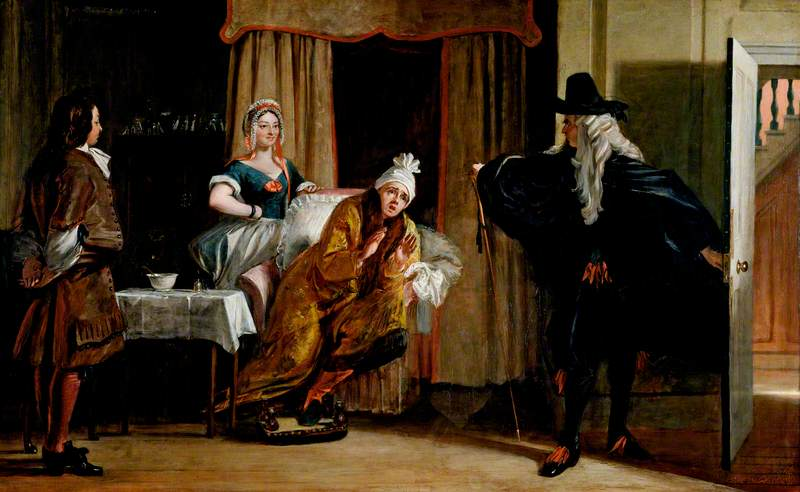
Le Malade Imaginaire by Charles Robert Leslie

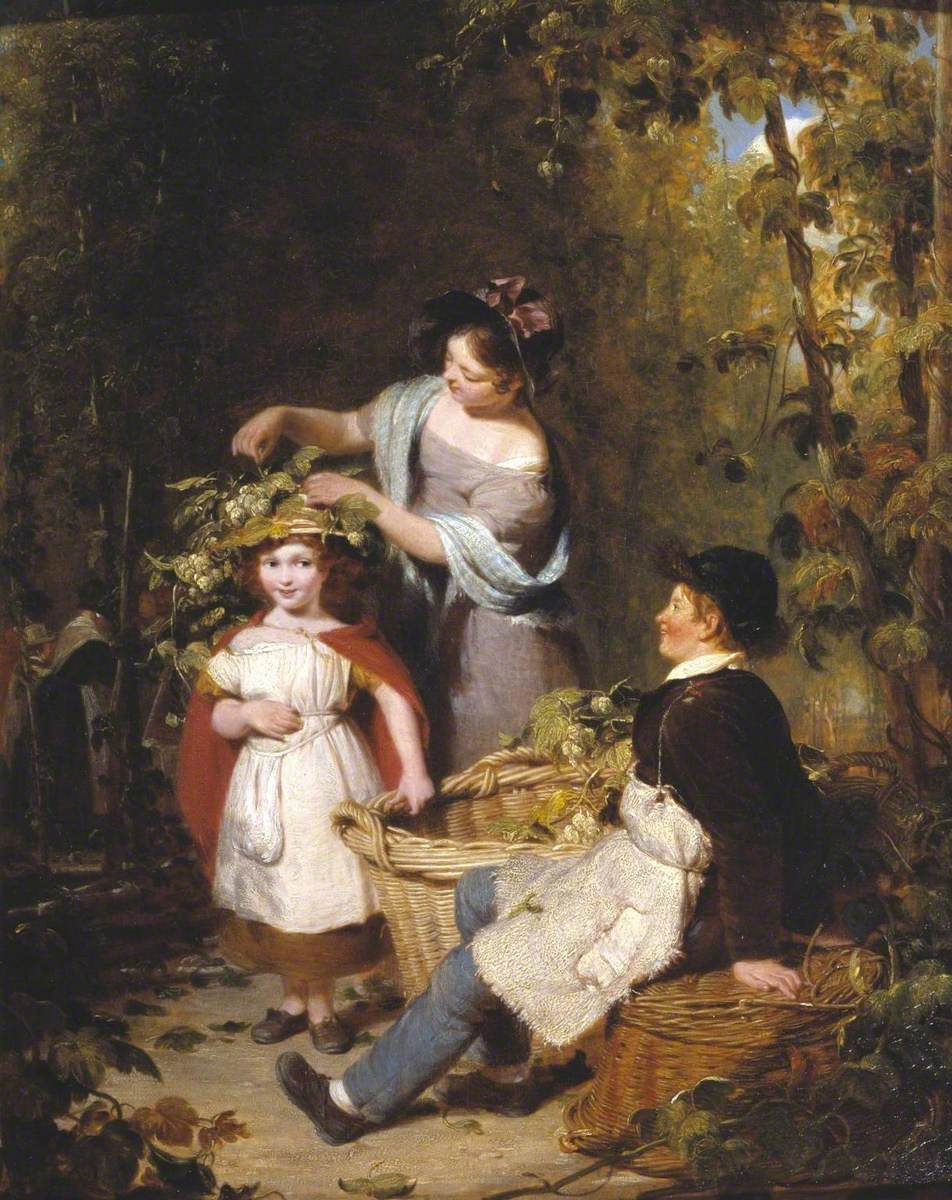
The Hop Garland by William Frederick Witherington

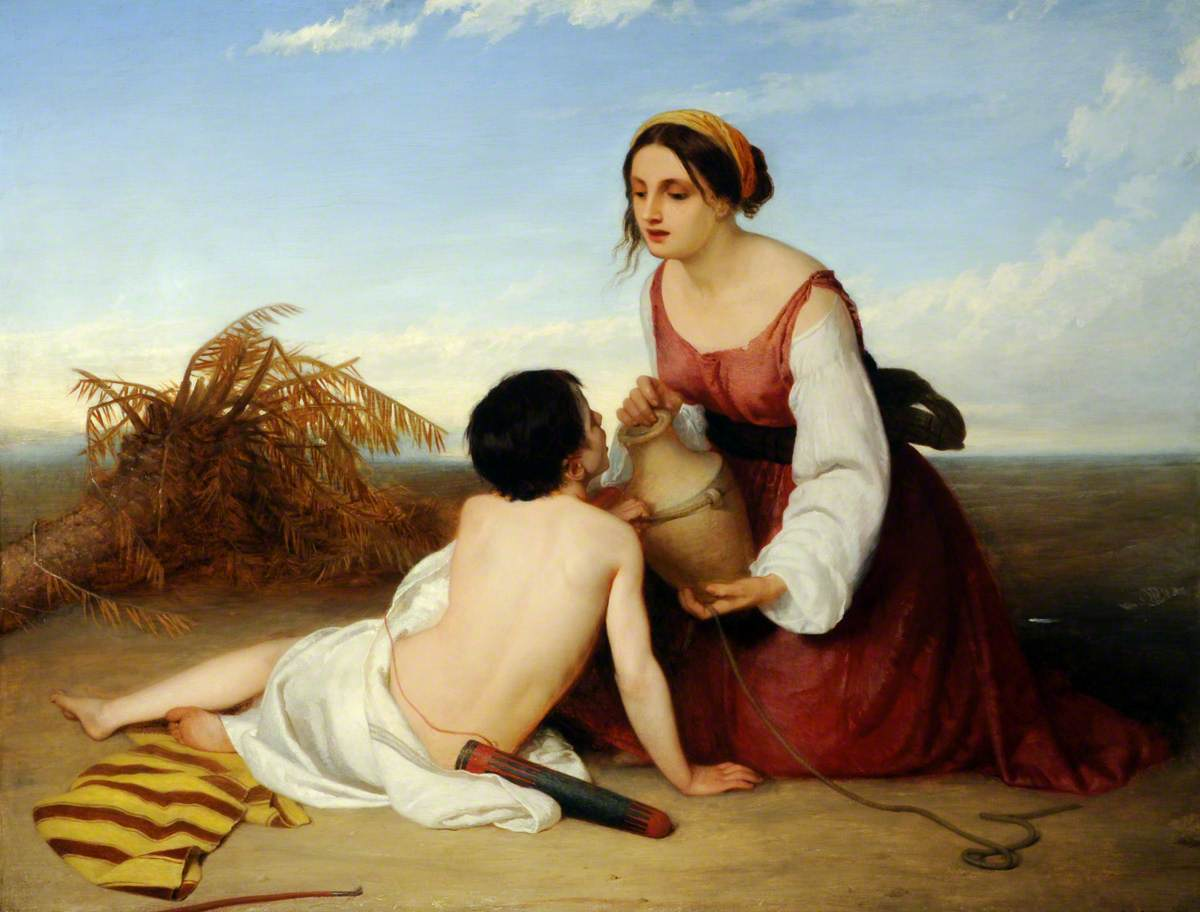
Hagar and Ishmael by Charles Lock Eastlake

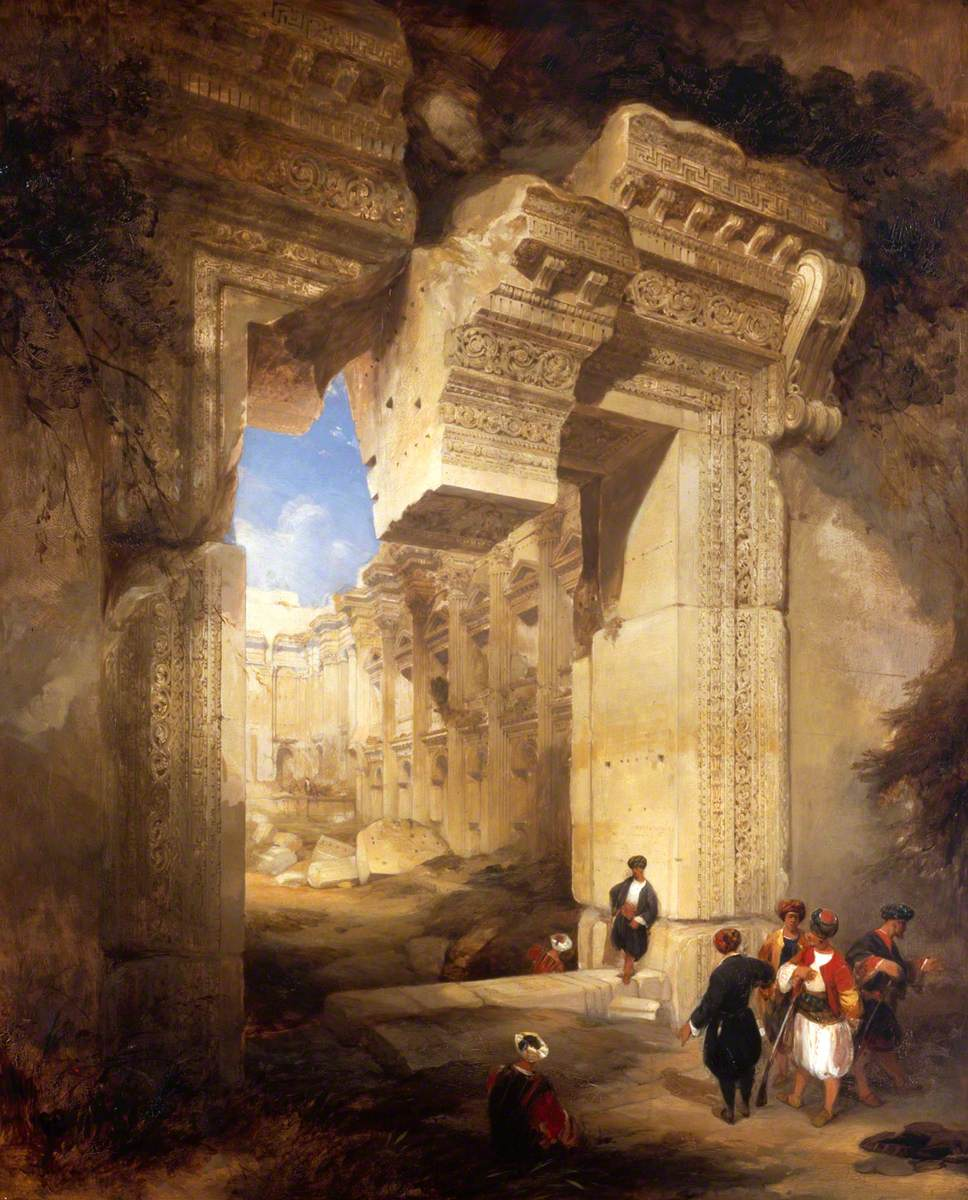
The Gateway to the Great Temple at Baalbec by David Roberts

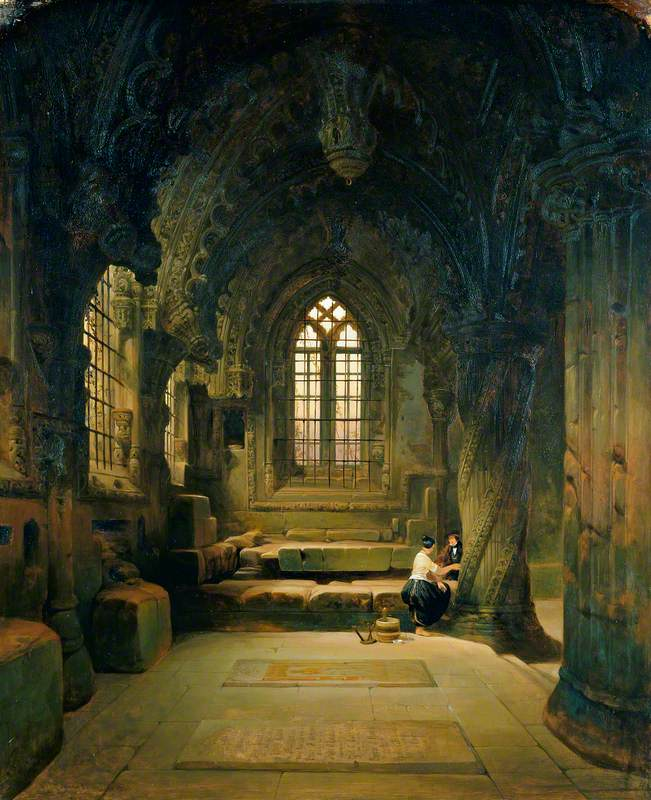
Entrance to the Crypt, Roslin Chapel by David Roberts

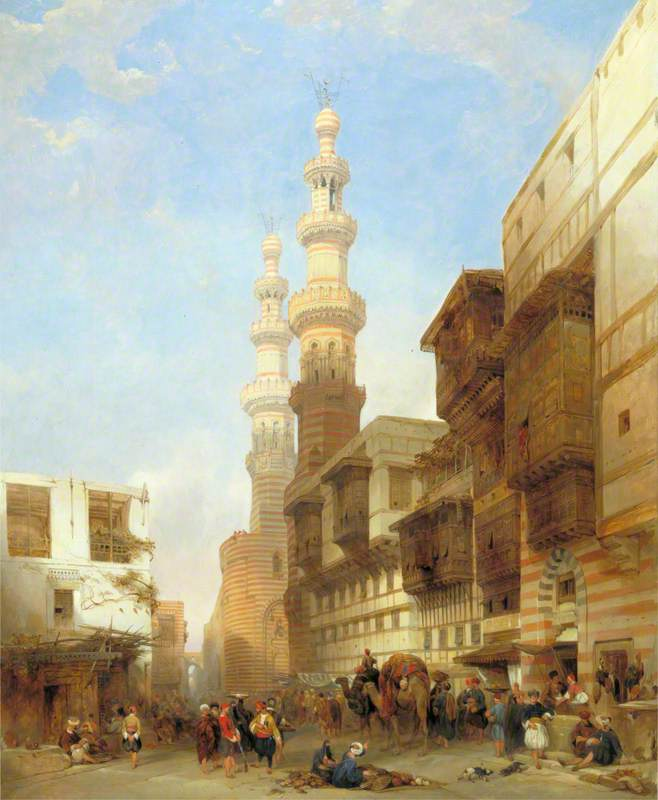
The Gate of Metawaley by David Roberts

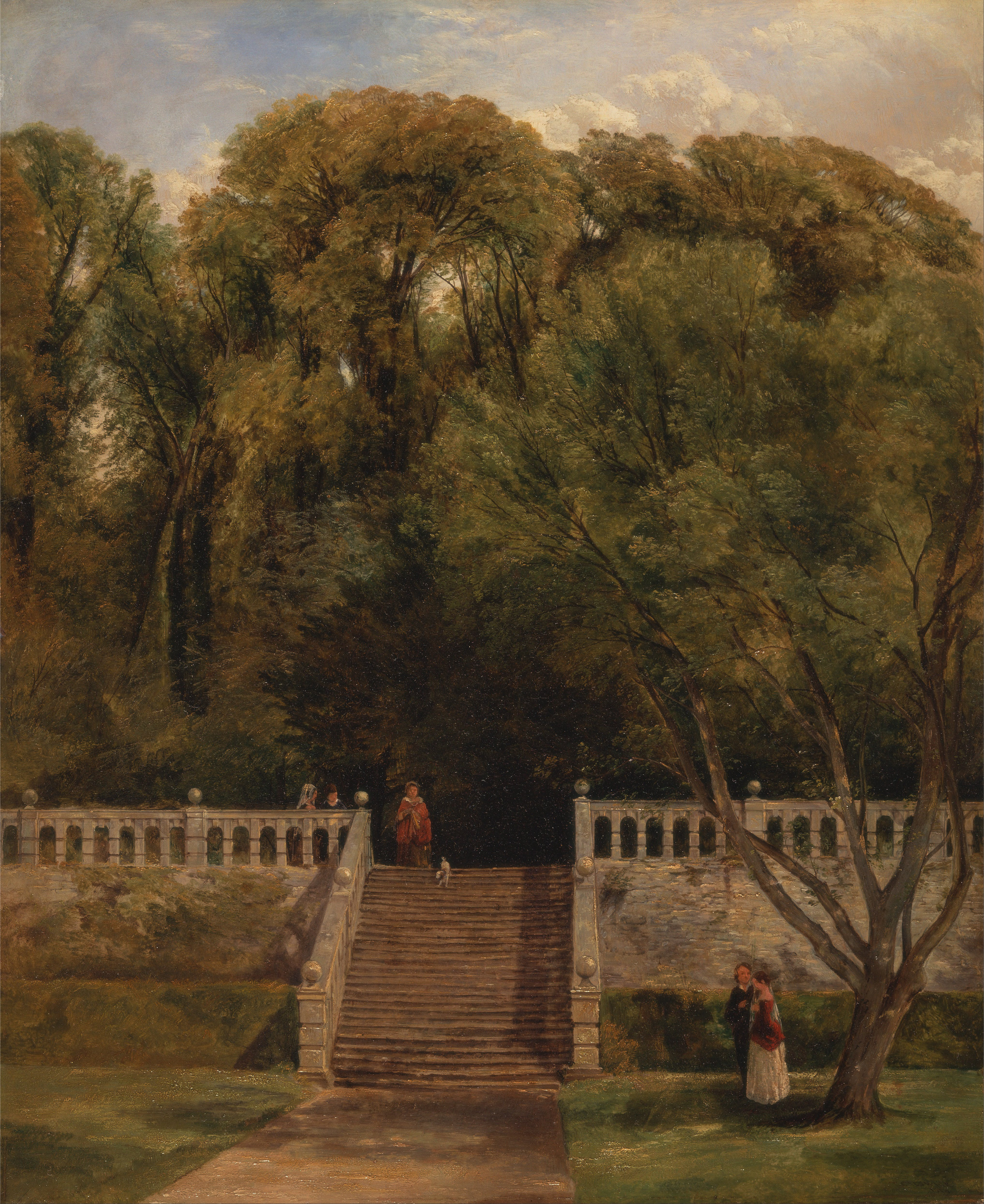
The Terrace by Thomas Creswick

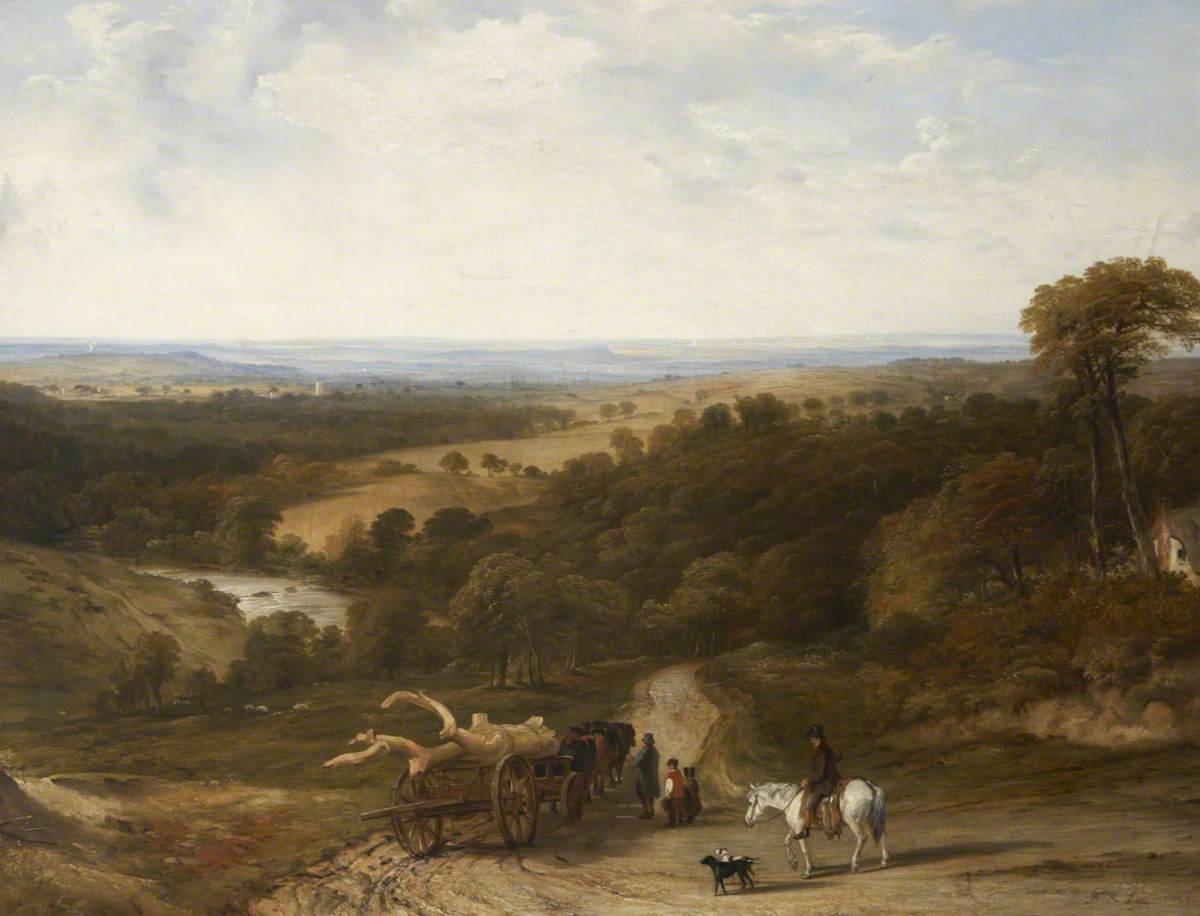
View near Crediton, Devon by Frederick Richard Lee

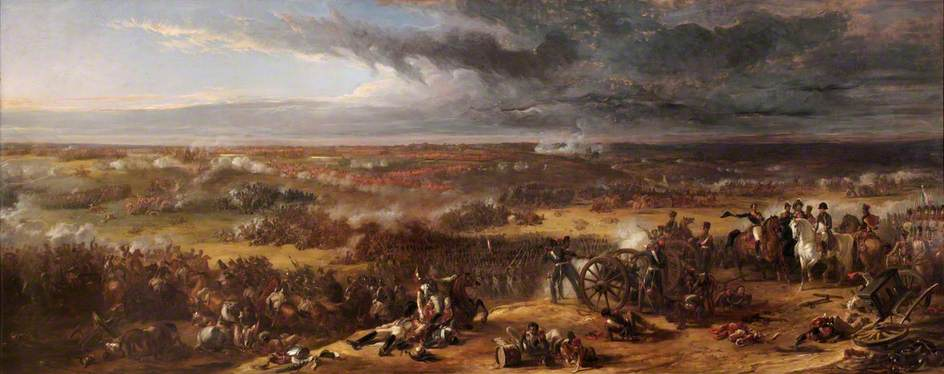
The Battle of Waterloo by William Allan

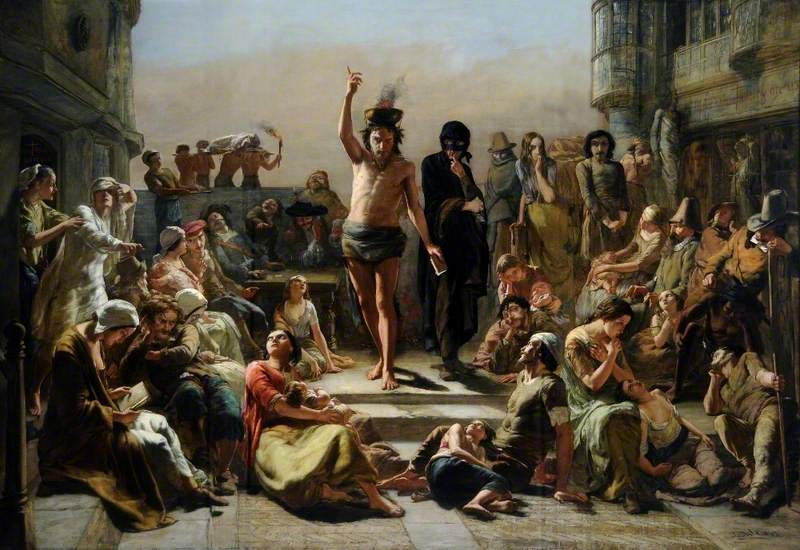
Solomon Eagle by Paul Falconer Poole

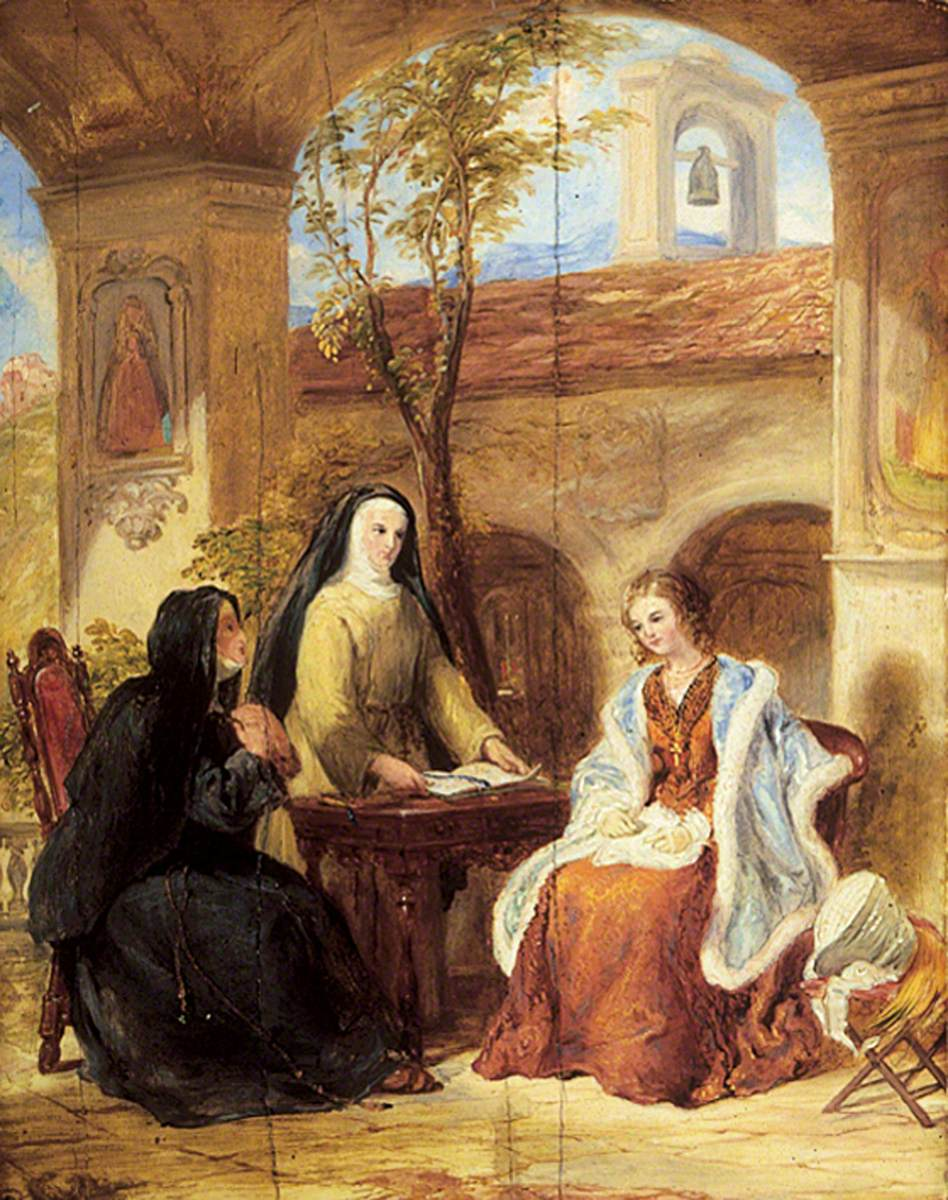
The World or the Cloister by William Collins

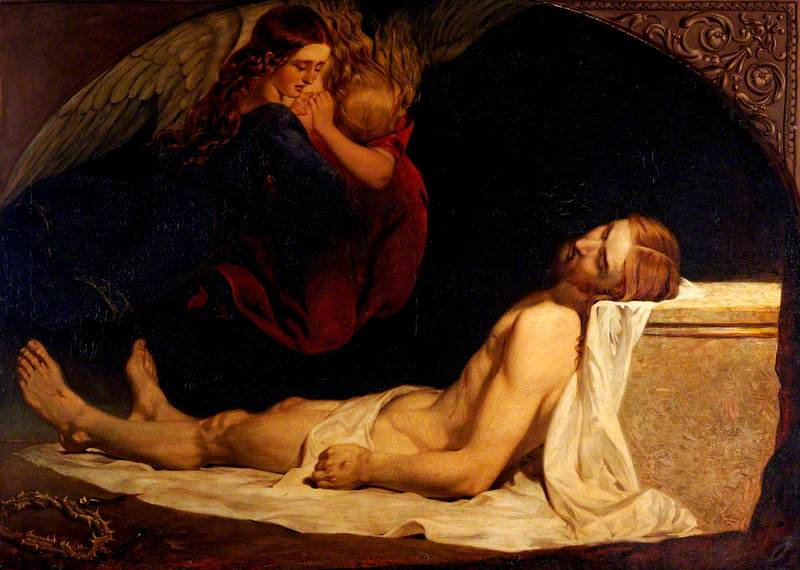
The Sepulchre by Marshall Claxton

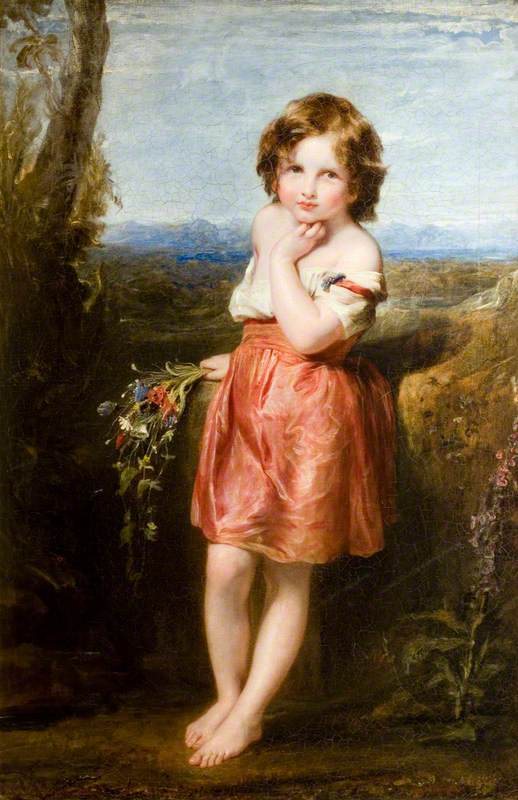
The Little Roamer by Richard Rothwell

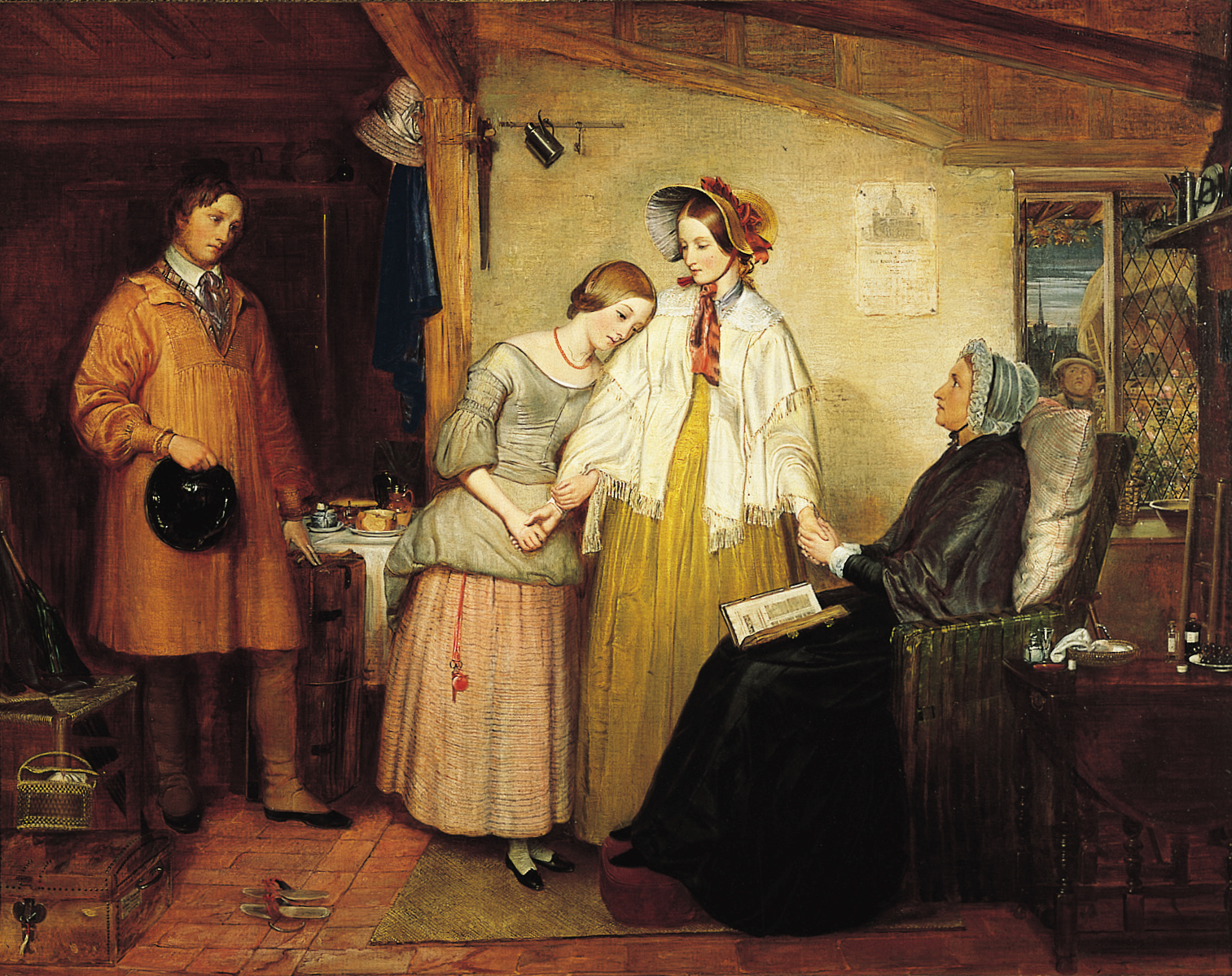
Going into Service by Richard Redgrave

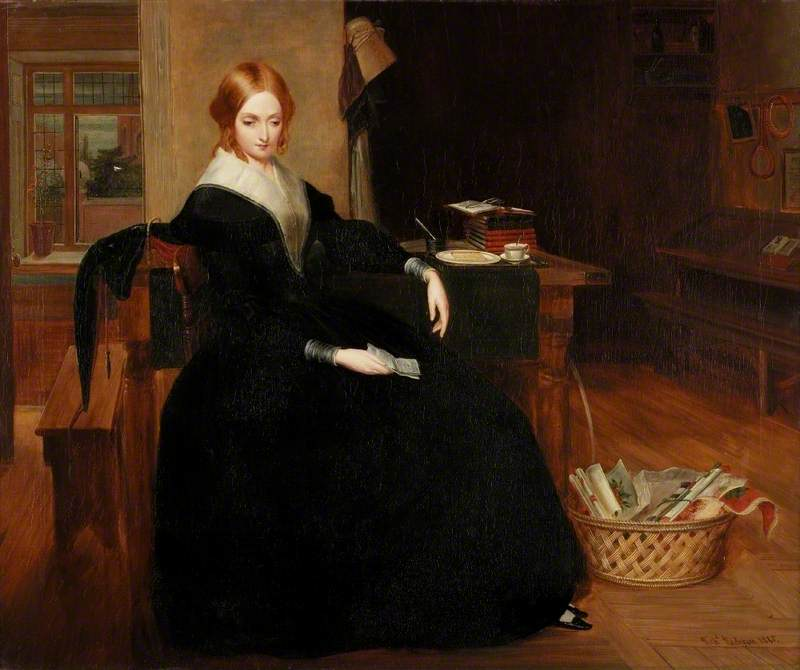
The Poor Teacher by Richard Redgrave

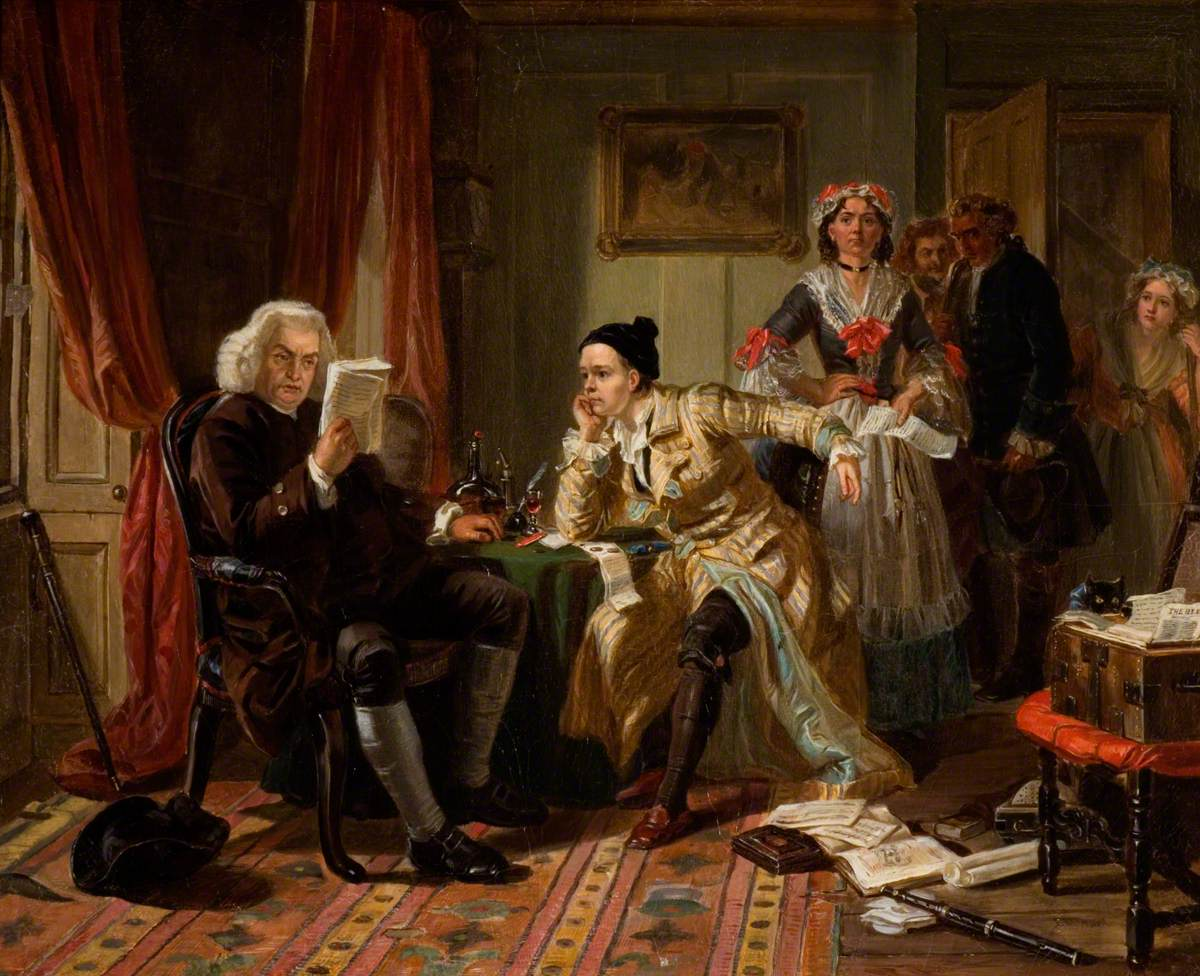
Johnson Reading the Manuscript of the Vicar of Wakefield by Edward Matthew Ward

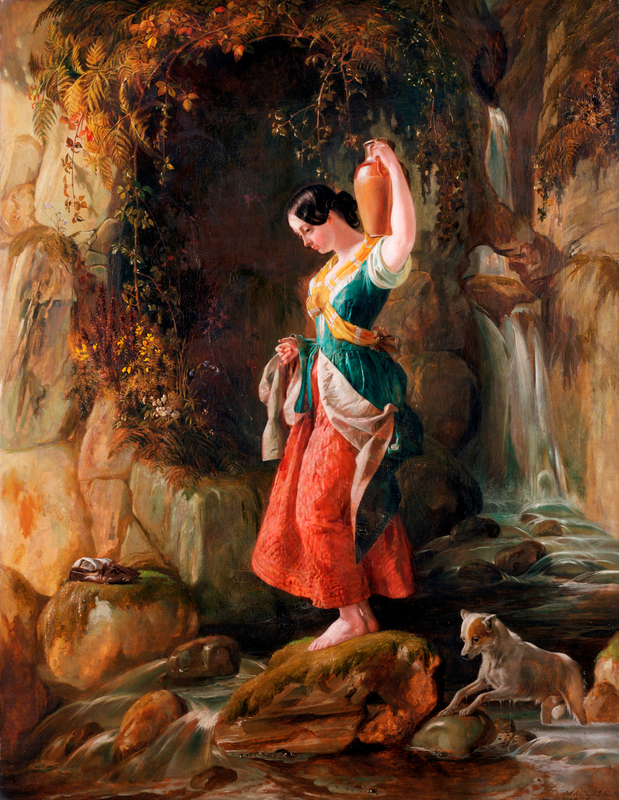
Waterfall at St Nighton's Kieve, near Tintagel by Daniel Maclise

Mont St Michel Shrimpers by Edward William Cooke

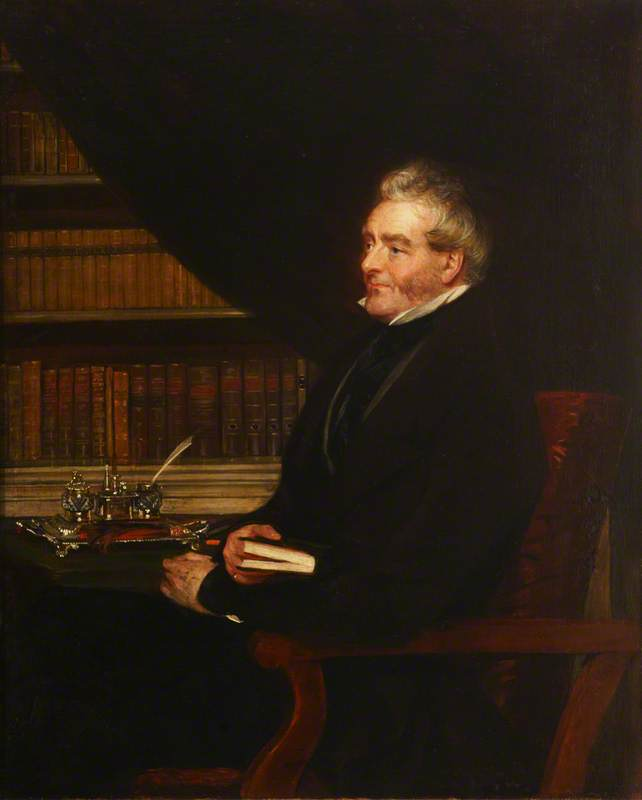
Portrait of Benjamin Travers by Charles Robert Leslie

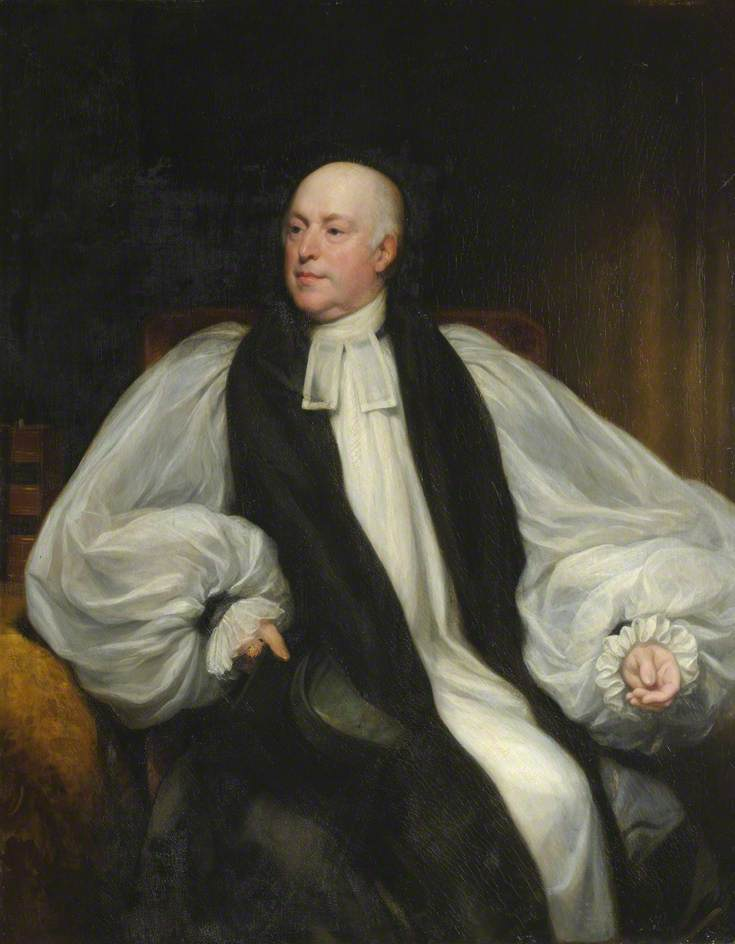
Portrait of Joseph Allen by Thomas Phillips

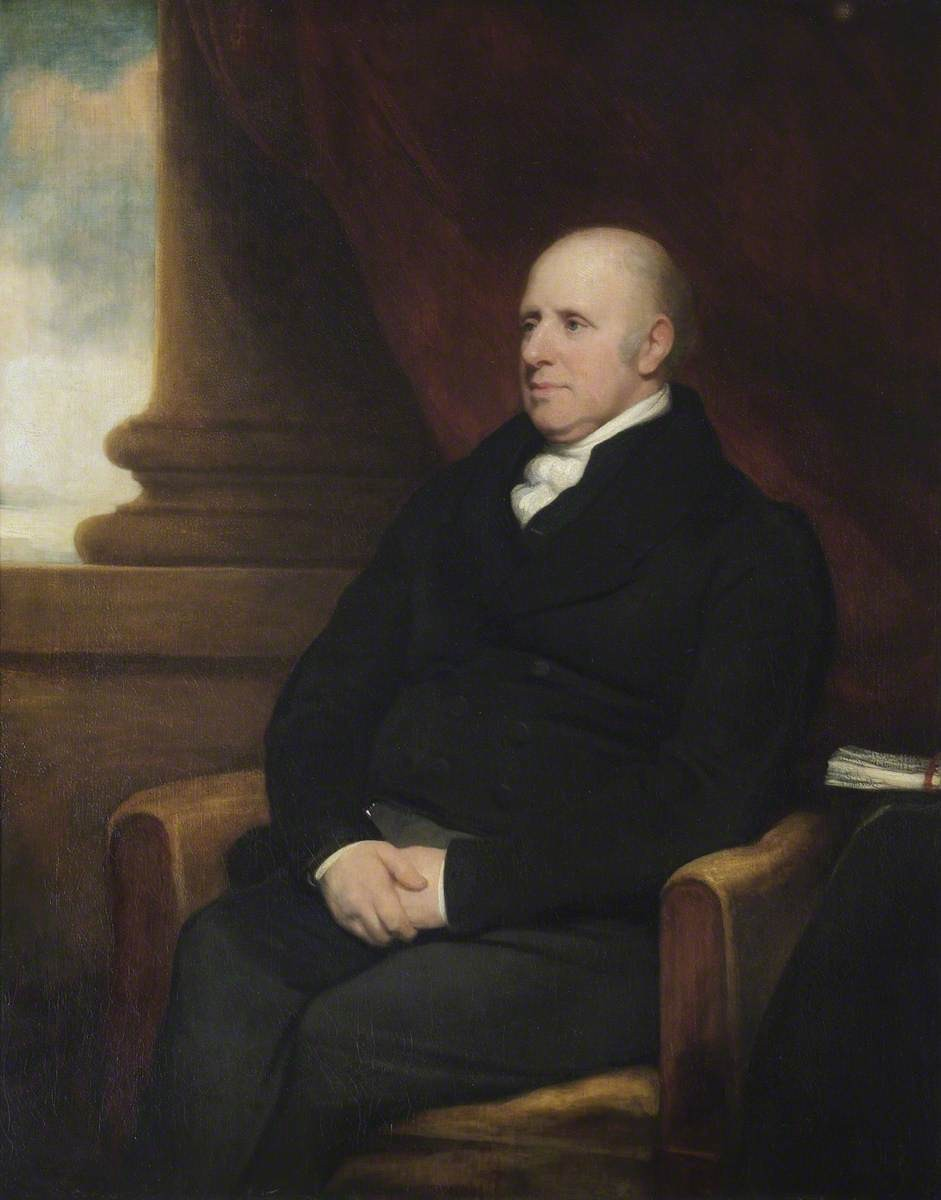
Portrait of Charles Pott by Thomas Phillips

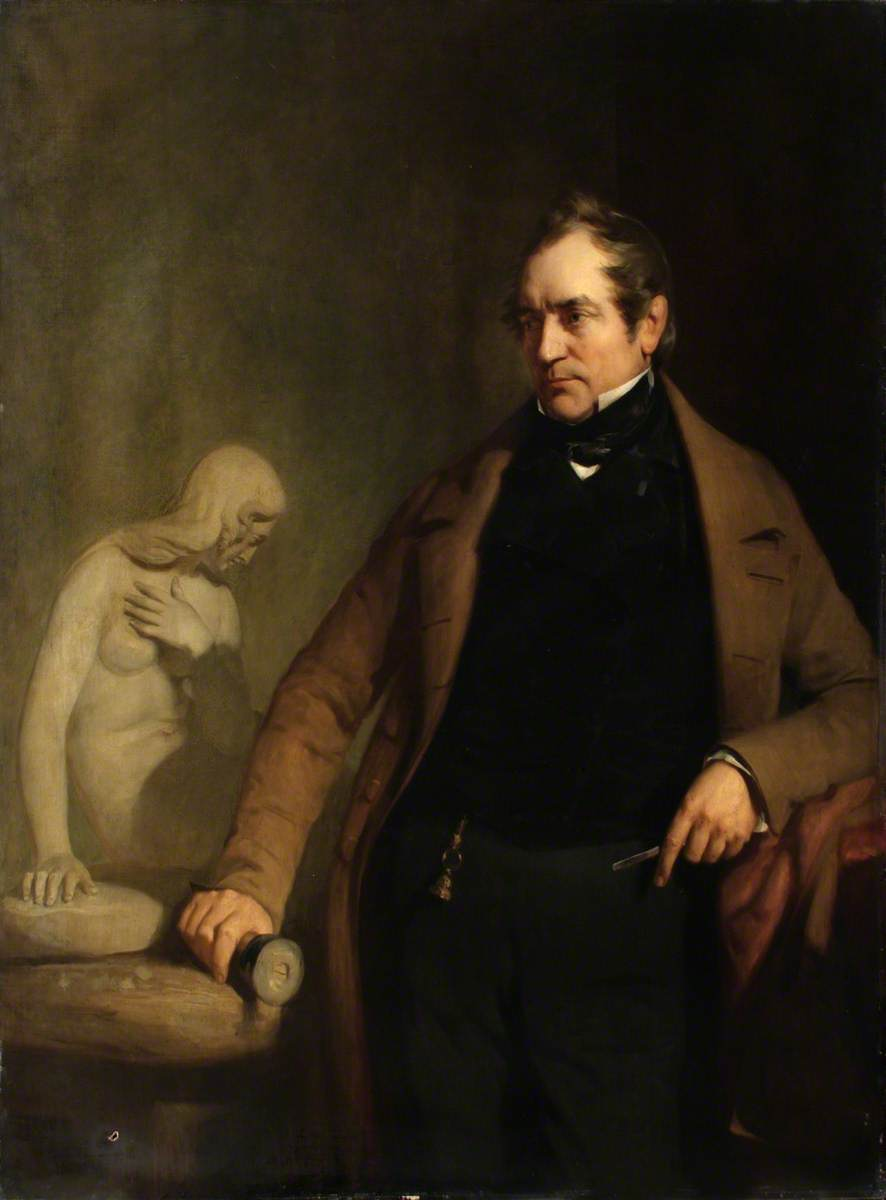
Portrait of Edward Hodges Baily by Thomas Mogford

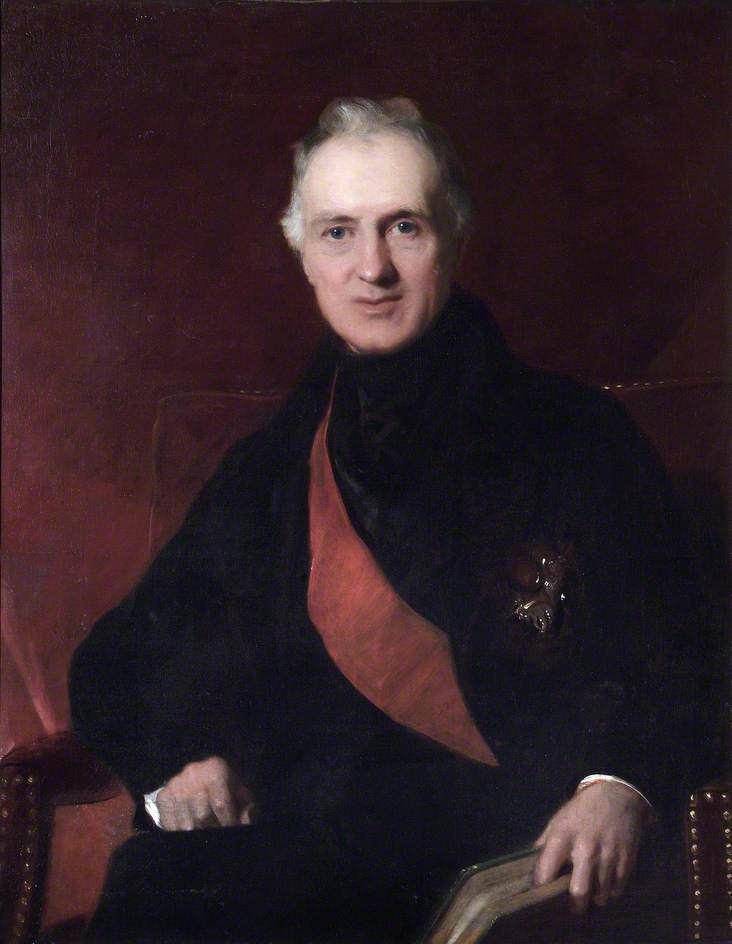
Portrait of George Murray by John Prescott Knight

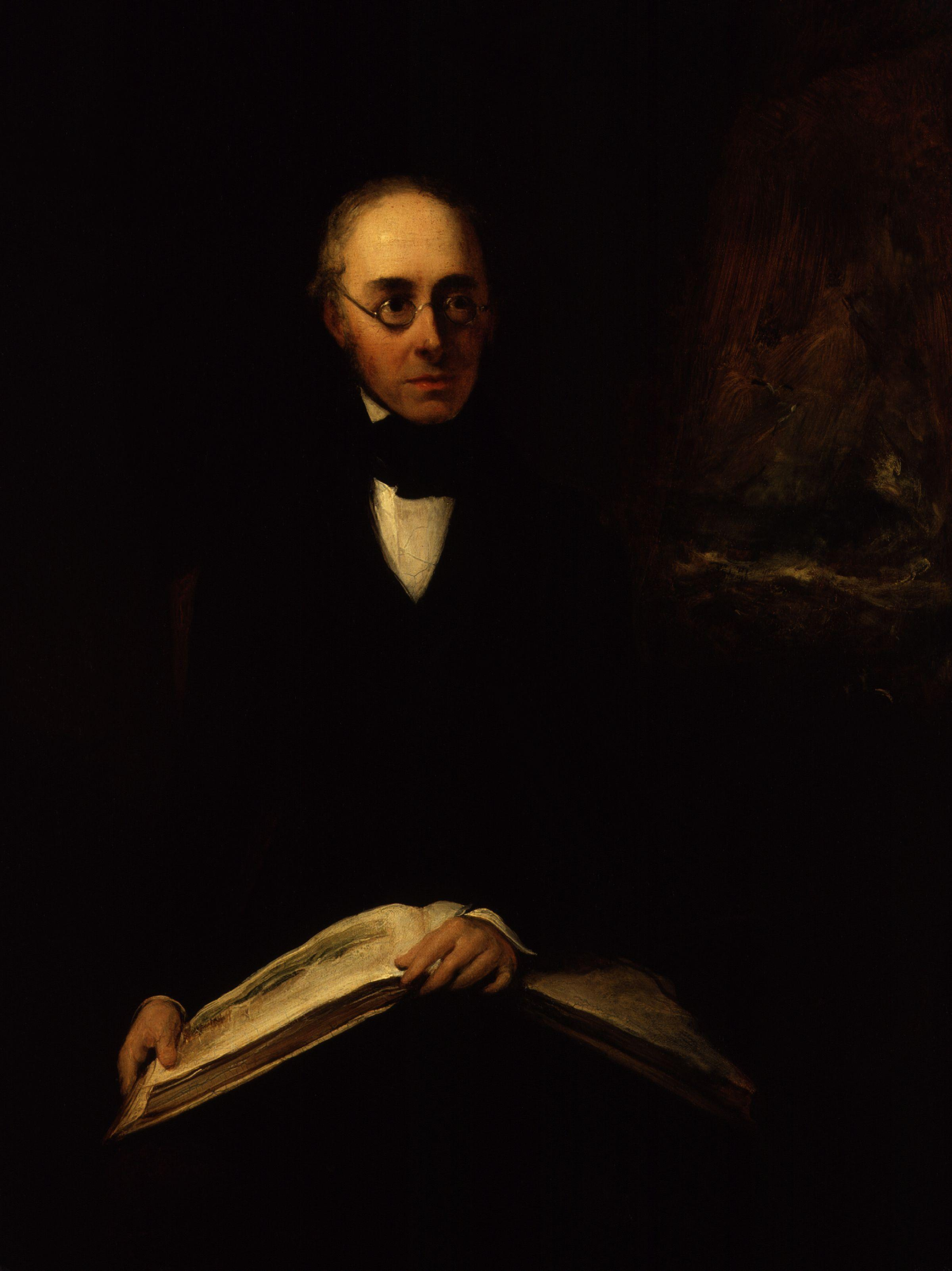
Portrait of Copley Fielding by William Boxall

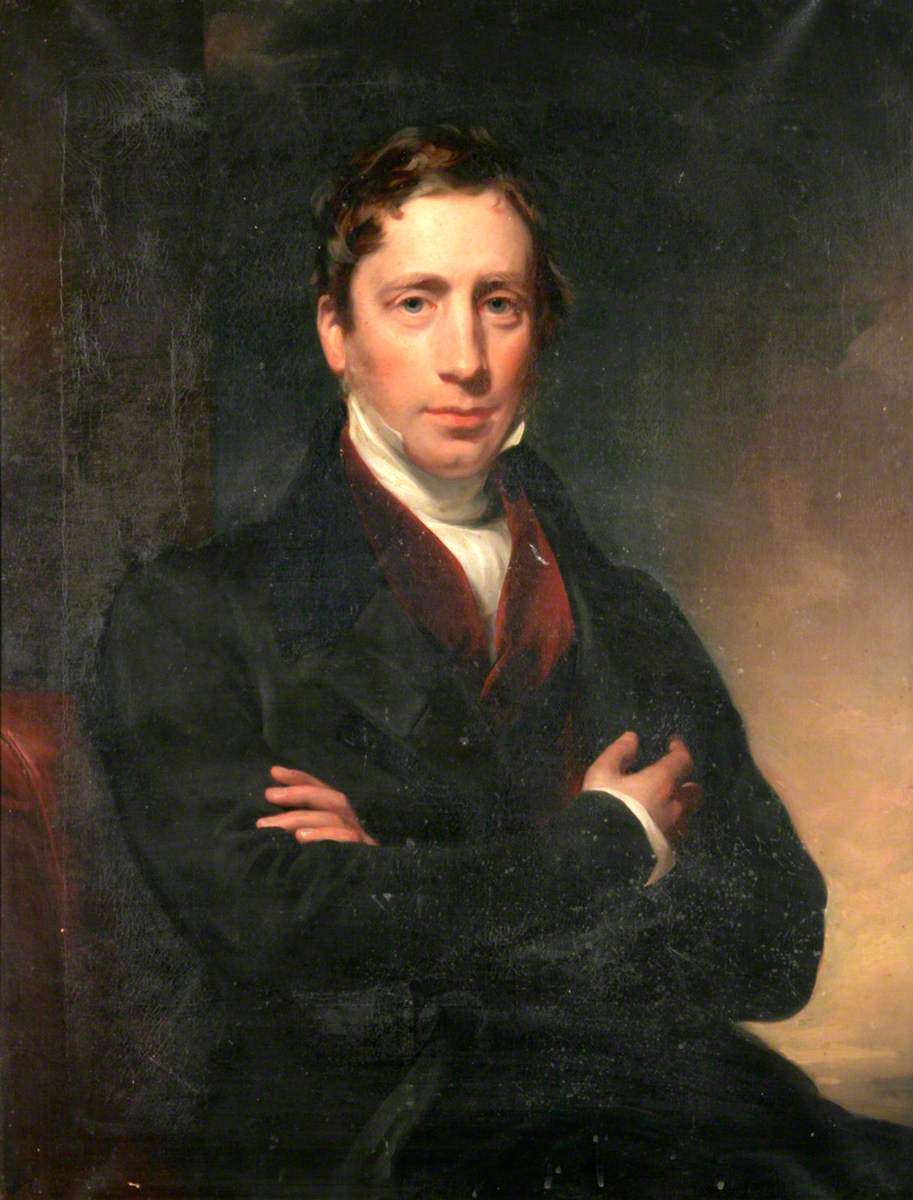
Portrait of John Buxton by Henry Perronet Briggs

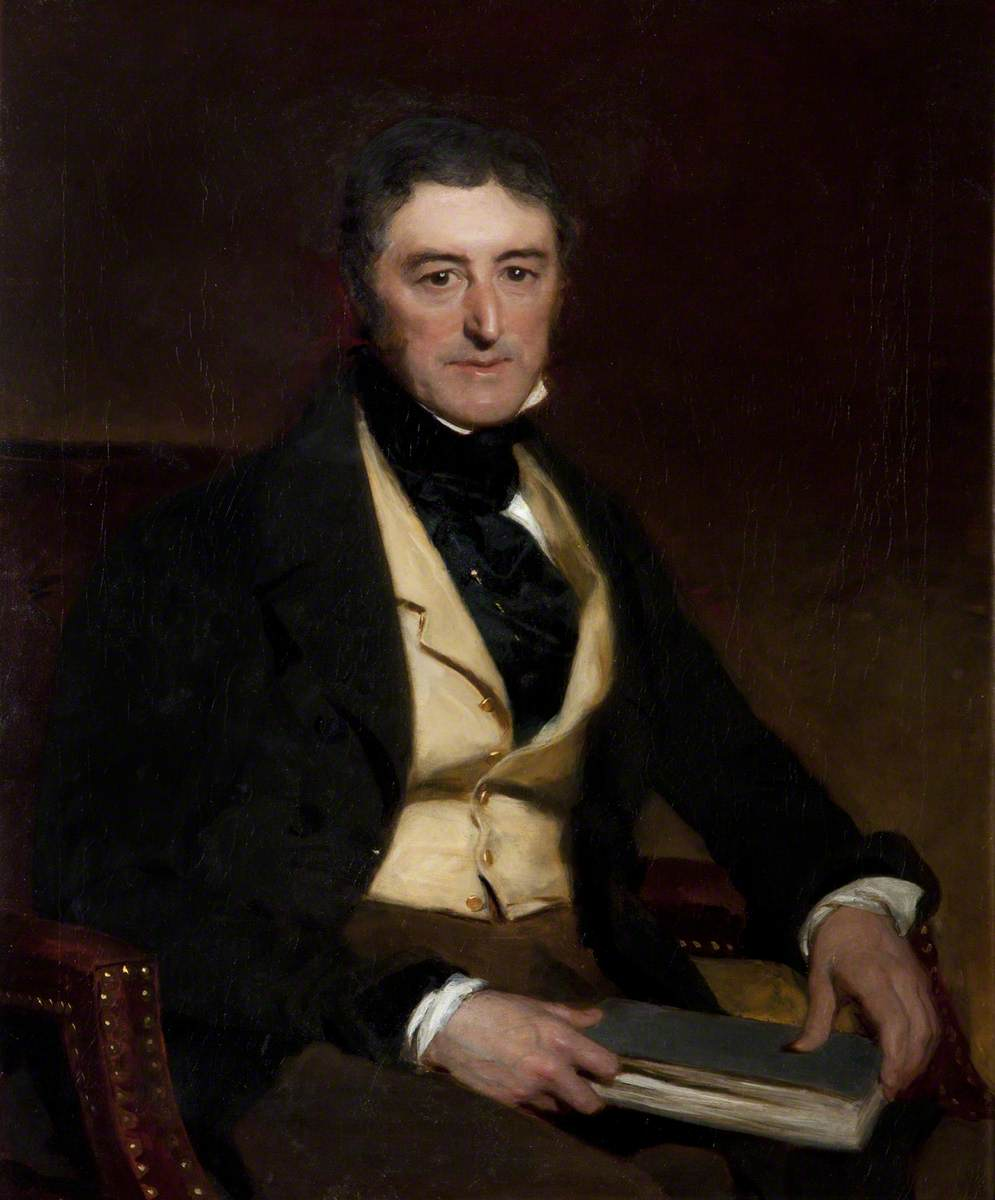
Portrait of William Sharman Crawford by John Prescott Knight

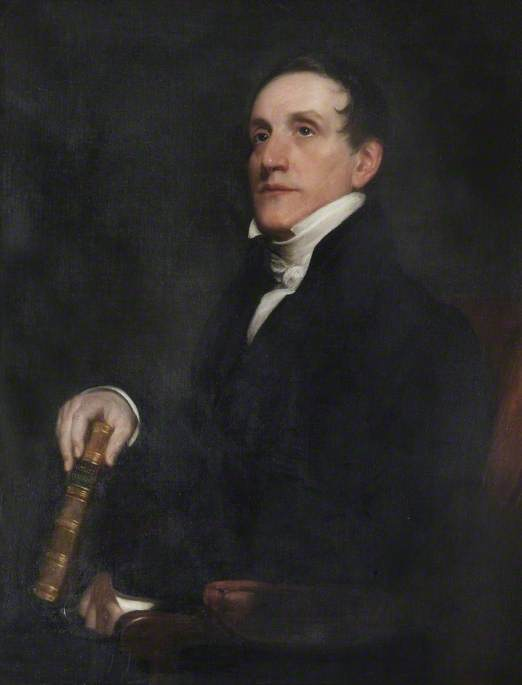
Portrait of John Narrien by Henry William Pickersgill

== See also ==
- Royal Academy Exhibition of 1842
- Royal Academy Exhibition of 1844

== Bibliography ==
- Bailey, Anthony. J. M. W. Turner: Standing in the Sun. Tate Enterprises Ltd, 2013.
- Guiterman, Helen. David Roberts, 1796-1864, Artist, Adventurer. Scottish Arts Council, 1981.
- Hamilton, James. Turner - A Life. Sceptre, 1998.
- Ormond, Richard. Sir Edwin Landseer. Philadelphia Museum of Art, 1981.
- Taylor, Miles. he Victorian Empire and Britain's Maritime World, 1837-1901: The Sea and Global History. Springer, 2013.
- Upstone, Rober. Exposed: The Victorian Nude. Tate Publishing, 2001.
