= Windsor Castle in Modern Times =

Painting by Edwin Landseer

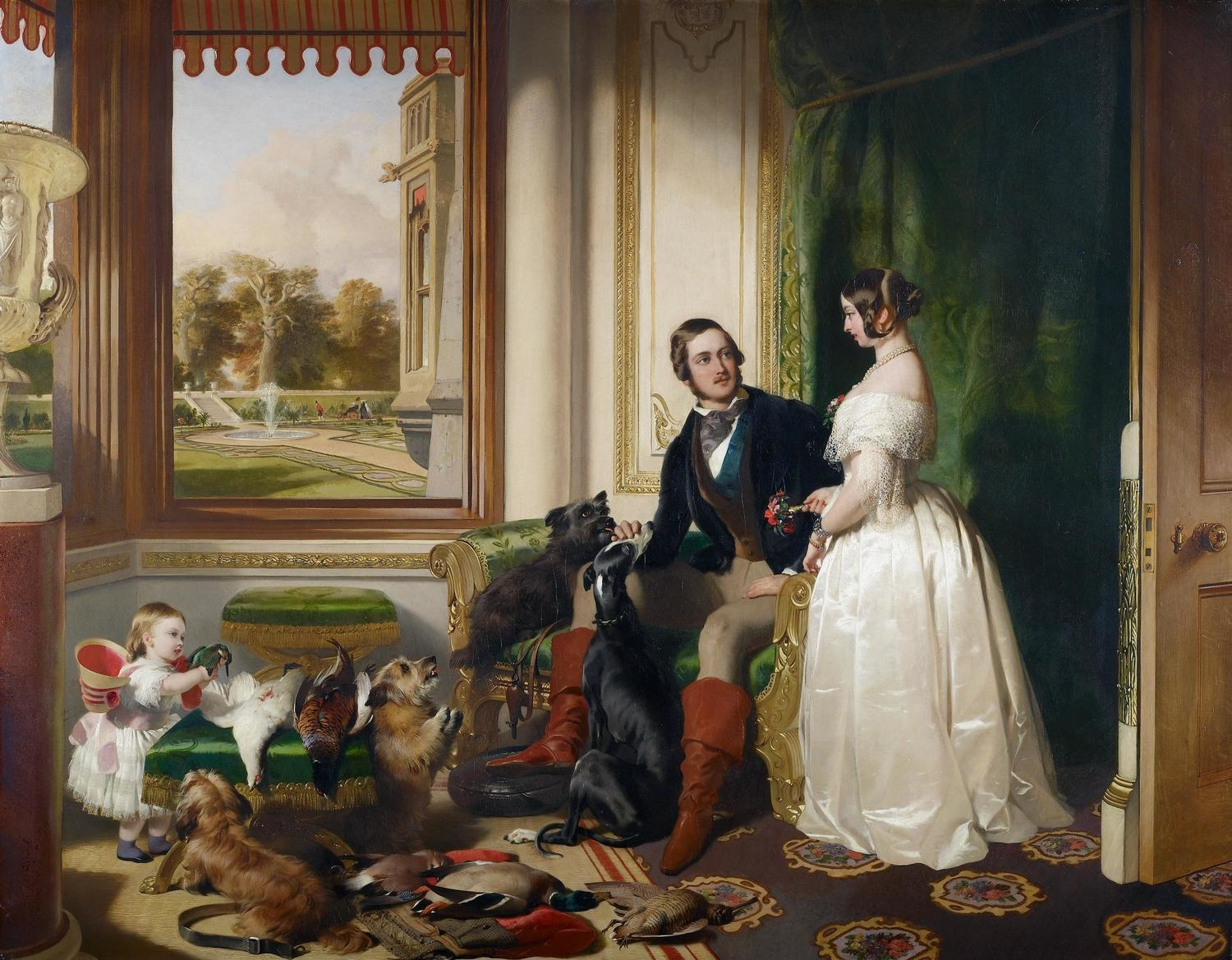
- Artist: Edwin Landseer
- Year: c. 1843
- Type: Oil on canvas, portrait painting
- Dimensions: 288 cm × 367 cm (113.4 in × 144.3 in)
- Location: Royal Collection

Windsor Castle in Modern Times is a c. 1843 portrait painting by the British artist Edwin Landseer. It depicts a scene at Windsor Castle where Prince Albert has returned from a day's hunting and displays his trophies to his wife Queen Victoria and their eldest child Victoria, Princess Royal. The picture was first commissioned shortly after the wedding of Queen Victoria and Prince Albert. It may have originally been conceived as a sequel to Queen Victoria Riding Out by Francis Grant, although it also serves as a companion piece to Queen Victoria and Prince Albert at the Bal Costumé of 12 May 1842 Landseer was paid 800 guineas for the work, which was only finally hung at Windsor Castle in 1845. It remains in the Royal Collection today.

== Bibliography ==
- Facos, Michelle. An Introduction to Nineteenth-Century Art. Taylor & Francis, 2011.
- Marsden, Jonathan. Victoria & Albert: Art & Love. Royal Collection, 2010.
- Ormond, Richard. Sir Edwin Landseer. Philadelphia Museum of Art, 1981.
