= The Opening of the Wallhalla =

Painting by J. M. W. Turner

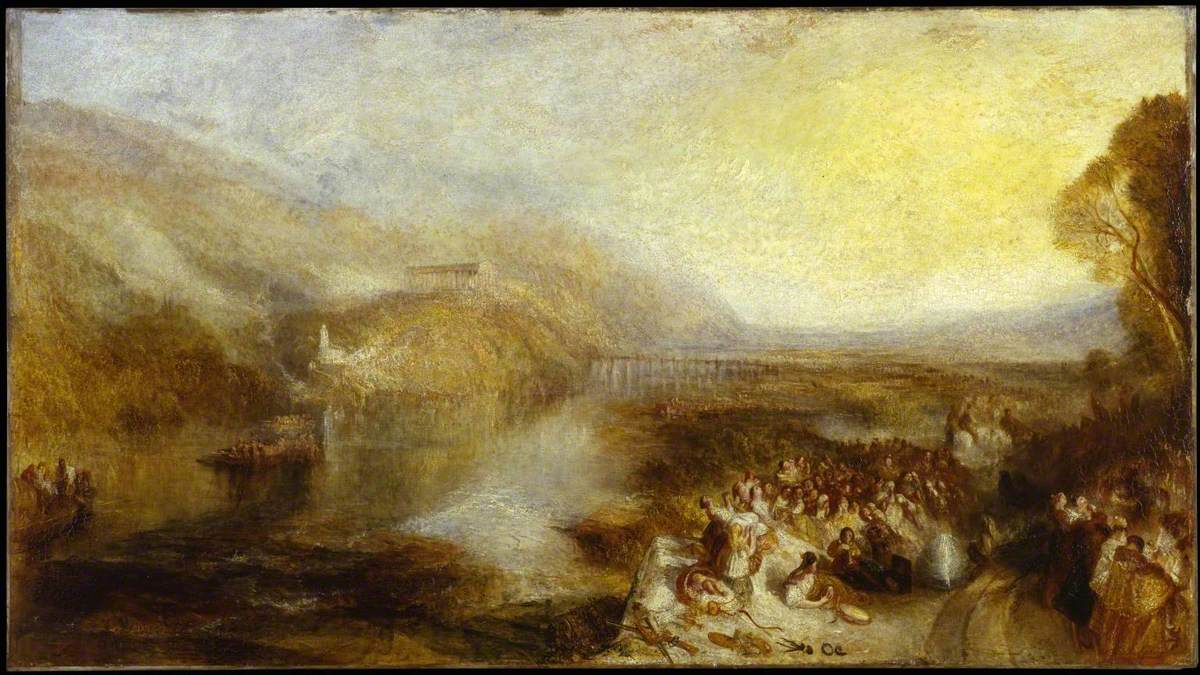
- Artist: J. M. W. Turner
- Year: 1843
- Type: Oil on mahogany, history painting
- Dimensions: 112.7 cm × 200.7 cm (44.4 in × 79.0 in)
- Location: Tate Britain, London

The Opening of the Wallhalla, 1842 is an 1843 oil painting by the British artist J.M.W. Turner. It depicts the opening ceremony for the Walhalla in Bavaria.

Located on a hillside outside Regensburg on the River Danube, the large Doric monument was constructed to celebrate German history overseen by Ludwig I of Bavaria.

Travelling back from Venice in 1840, Turner had seen the Walhalla under construction. Intending this as a tribute, he imagined the opening ceremony as a panoramic landscape.

== Exhibitions and Critical Reception ==
Turner displayed the work at the Royal Academy Exhibition of 1843 at the National Gallery in London.

Turner exhibited paintings only twice outside of England and both were very badly received by local critics. (Note: According to Moorby, the first was a solo exhibition in Rome in 1828 of paintings of Italian themes. Local critics reviews were very negative and it even generated an extremely crude cartoon comparing it to excrement that was widely circulated.)

The Opening of the Walhalla was included in a 1845 exhibition called the Congress of European Art in Munich. The painting generated acrimonious criticism as the Germans were "horrified [...] and appalled by the loose handling and lack of form and regrettably interpreted it as a satire upon their country."

The picture formed part of the Turner Bequest of 1856 and is now in the collection of the Tate Britain in Pimlico.

== See also ==
- List of paintings by J. M. W. Turner

== Bibliography ==
- Bailey, Anthony. J.M.W. Turner: Standing in the Sun. Tate Enterprises, 2013
- Moorby, Nicola (2025). Turner and Constable: Art, Life, and Landscape. Yale University Press. ISBN 978-0300275810.
- Moyle, Franny. Turner: The Extraordinary Life and Momentous Times of J. M. W. Turner. Penguin Books, 2016.
- Reynolds, Graham. Turner. Thames & Hudson, 2022.
