= St Benedetto, Looking Towards Fusina =

Painting by J. M. W. Turner

St Benedetto, Looking towards Fusina
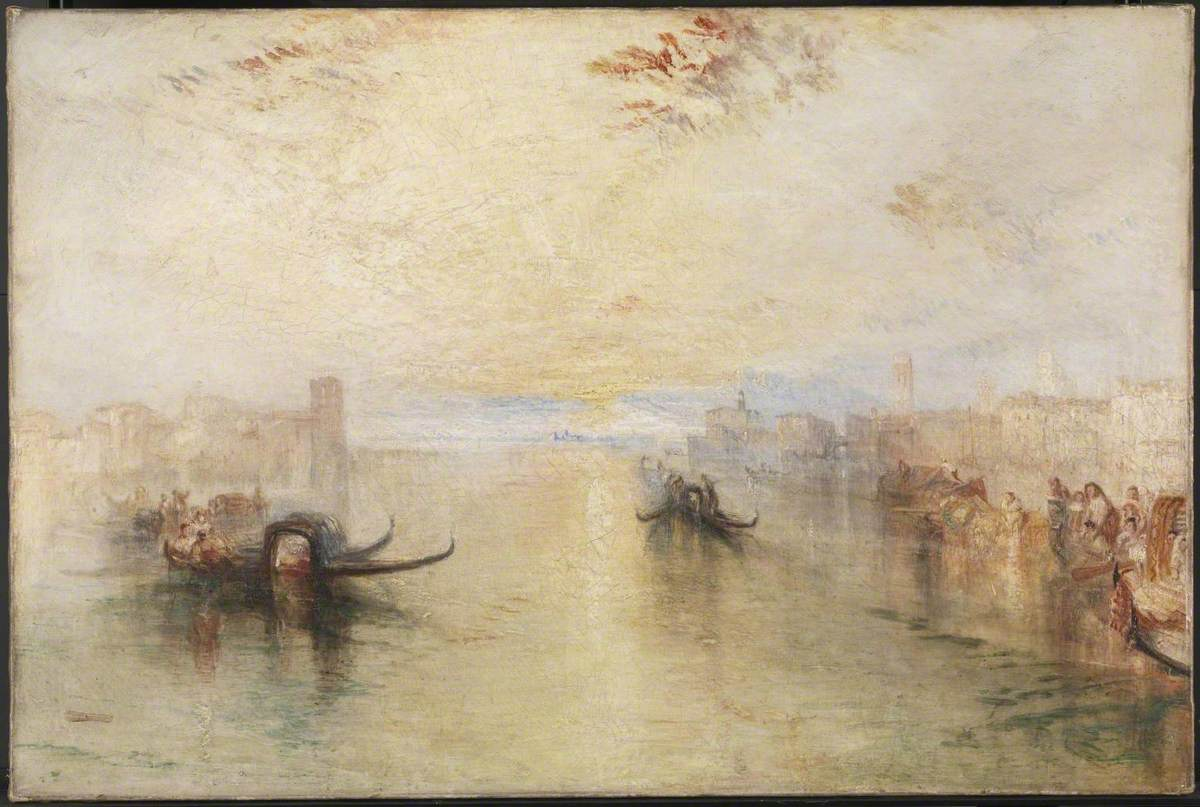
- Artist: J. M. W. Turner
- Year: 1843
- Type: Oil on canvas, landscape painting
- Dimensions: 62.2 cm × 92.7 cm (24.5 in × 36.5 in)
- Location: Tate Britain, London

St Benedetto, Looking towards Fusina is an 1843 landscape painting by the British artist J.M.W. Turner. One of a number of pictures of Venice that Turner produced during the period, it features a view from the Giudecca canal towards Fusina. The title is somewhat fanciful as there is no church at the location called St Benedetto.

By this late stage Turner's work was becoming increasingly abstract and impressionistic. The painting was displayed at the Royal Academy Exhibition of 1843 at the National Gallery in London, one of his paintings he submitted that year including several views of Venice. The young critic John Ruskin, a key admirer of Turner, praised the work at the time and a more than a decade later commented " Take it all in all, I think this is the best Venetian picture of Turner's which he has left to us".After Turner's death the painting formed part of the large Turner Bequest to the nation and is now in the possession of the Tate Britain.

== See also ==
- List of paintings by J. M. W. Turner

== Bibliography ==
- Bailey, Anthony. J.M.W. Turner: Standing in the Sun. Tate Enterprises, 2013
- Hewison, Robert. Ruskin, Turner, and the pre-Raphaelites. Tate Gallery, 2000.
- Costello, Leo. J.M.W. Turner and the Subject of History. Routledge, 2017.
- Finberg, Alexander Joseph. In Venice with Turner. Cotswold Gallery, 1930.
- Hamilton, James (ed.) Turner and Italy. National Galleries of Scotland, 2009.
