= The Gate of Metawaley =

Painting by David Roberts

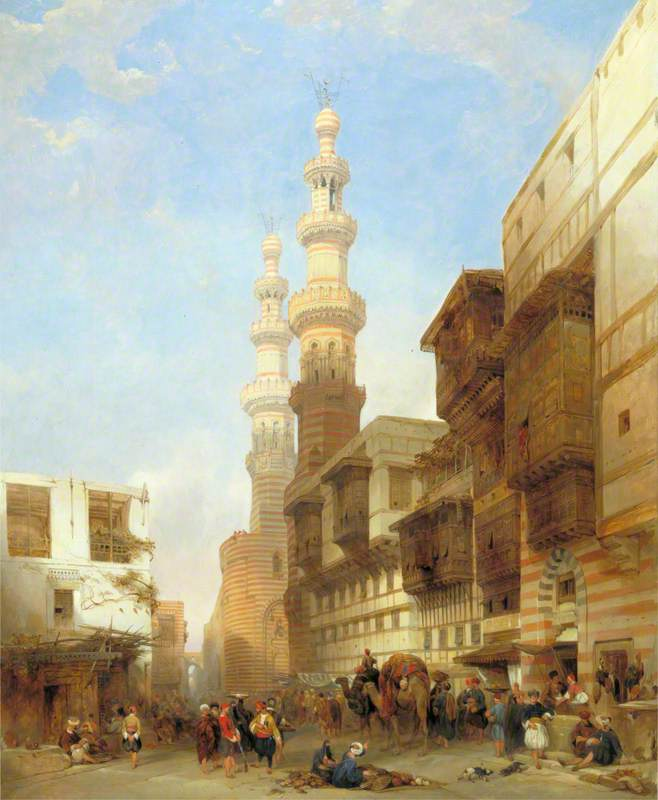
- Artist: David Roberts
- Year: 1843
- Type: Oil on panel, landscape painting
- Dimensions: 76.1 cm × 62.8 cm (30.0 in × 24.7 in)
- Location: Victoria and Albert Museum, London

The Gate of Metawaley is an 1843 oil painting by the British artist David Roberts. A cityscape, it features a view of the district of Metawalea in Cairo including medieval gates to the city and the minarets of the Mosque of Sultan al-Muayyad. Having initially begun his career as a scenic designer at Covent Garden and Drury Lane, Roberts became well-known for his journeys to the Middle East and produced a number of paintings of the region. The painting was displayed at the Royal Academy Exhibition of 1843 at the National Gallery in London. Today it is part of the collection of the Victoria and Albert Museum in South Kensington having been given by art collector John Sheepshanks as part of the Sheepshanks Gift in 1857. In 1840 Roberts produced A View in Cairo which featured a different view of the same area and was acquired by Queen Victoria for the Royal Collection.

== Bibliography ==
- Clarke, Deborah & Remington, Vanessa. Scottish Artists 1750-1900: From Caledonia to the Continent. Royal Collection Trust, 2015.
- Roe, Sonia. Oil Paintings in Public Ownership in the Victoria and Albert Museum. Public Catalogue Foundation, 2008.
- Sim, Katherine. David Roberts R.A., 1796–1864: A Biography. Quartet Books, 1984.
- Wright, Christopher, Gordon, Catherine May & Smith, Mary Peskett. British and Irish Paintings in Public Collections: An Index of British and Irish Oil Paintings by Artists Born Before 1870 in Public and Institutional Collections in the United Kingdom and Ireland. Yale University Press, 2006.
