= The Sun of Venice Going to Sea =

Painting by J. M. W. Turner

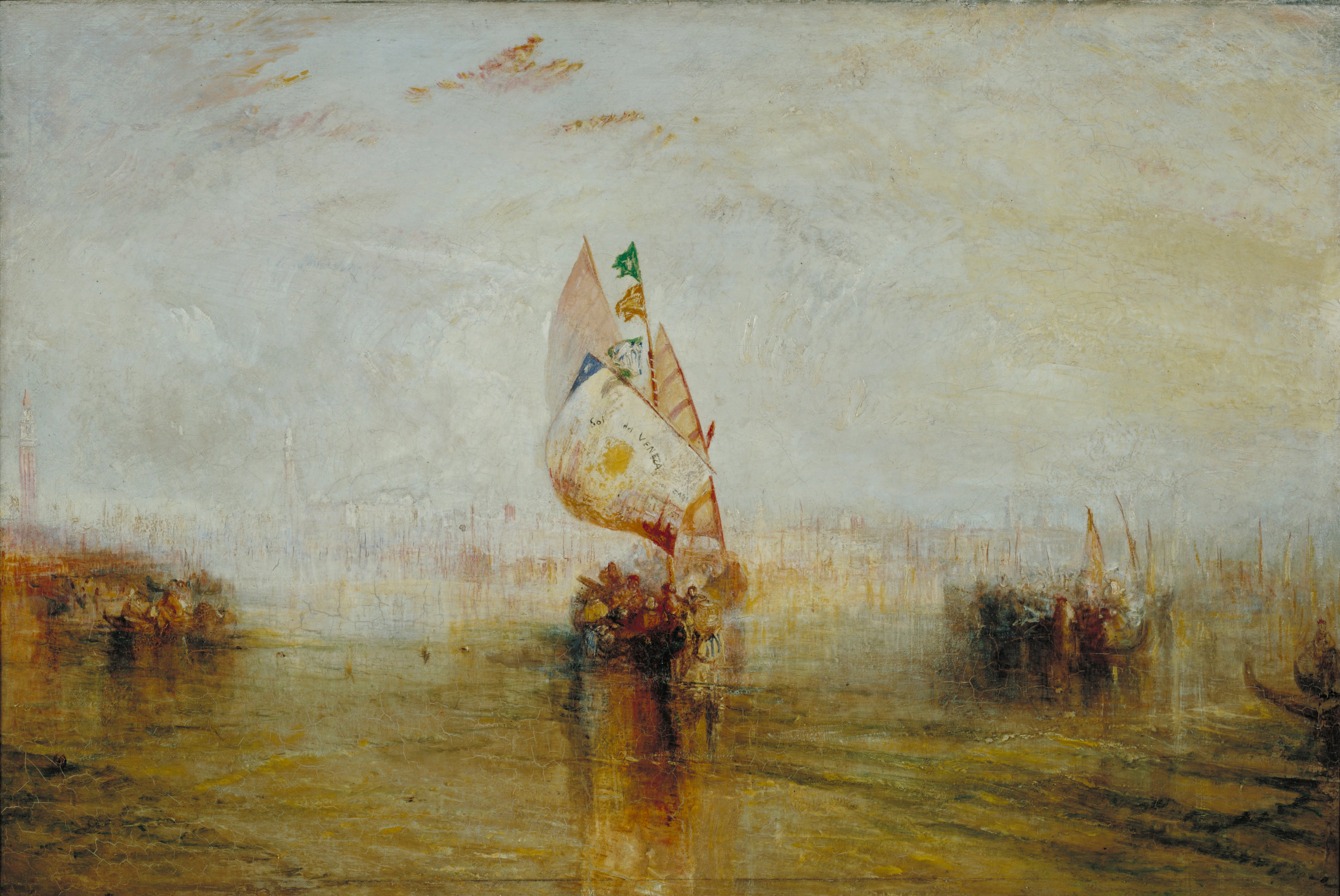
- Artist: J. M. W. Turner
- Year: 1843
- Type: Oil on canvas, landscape painting
- Dimensions: 61.6 cm × 92.1 cm (24.3 in × 36.3 in)
- Location: Tate Britain, London

The Sun of Venice Going to Sea is an 1843 seascape painting by the British artist J.M.W. Turner. It shows a fishing vessel heading out to sea from Venice, with its name The Sol di Venezia emblazoned on its sails.

It was one of a large number of works Turner produced with views of Venice, then part of the Austrian Empire, in his later career. The painting was displayed at the Royal Academy Exhibition of 1843 at the National Gallery in London. Turner's admirer John Ruskin was particularly impressed by it. It formed part of the Turner Bequest of 1856 to the nation and is now in the collection of the Tate Britain.

== Ruskin's Critique ==
In Modern Painters (1903), John Ruskin extols the depiction of the boat's reflection on the water:

A stream of splendid colour fell from the boat, but that occupied the centre only; in the distance the city and crowded boats threw down some playing lines, but these still left on each side of the boat a large space of water reflecting nothing but the morning sky. This was divided by an eddying swell, on whose continuous sides the local colour of the water was seen, pure aquamarine (a beautiful occurrence of closely observed truth); but still there remained a large blank space of pale water to be treated, the sky above had no distinct details, and was pure faingrey, with broken white vestiges of cloud; it gave no help therefore. But there the water lay, no dead grey flat paint, but downright clear, playing, palpable surface, full of indefinite hue, and retiring as regularly and visibly back and far away, as if there had been objects all over it to tell the story by perspective. Now it is the doing of this which tries the painter, and it is his having done this which made me say above that "no man had ever painted the surface of calm water but Turner."

== See also ==
- List of paintings by J. M. W. Turner

== Bibliography ==
- Bailey, Anthony. J.M.W. Turner: Standing in the Sun. Tate Enterprises Ltd, 2013
- Finberg, Alexander Joseph. In Venice with Turner. Cotswold Gallery, 1930.
- Hamilton, James (ed.) Turner and Italy. National Galleries of Scotland, 2009.
- Plant, Margaret. Venice: Fragile City, 1797-1997. Yale University Press, 2002.
- Reynolds, Graham. Turner. Thames & Hudson, 2022.
