= Going into Service =

Painting by Richard Redgrave

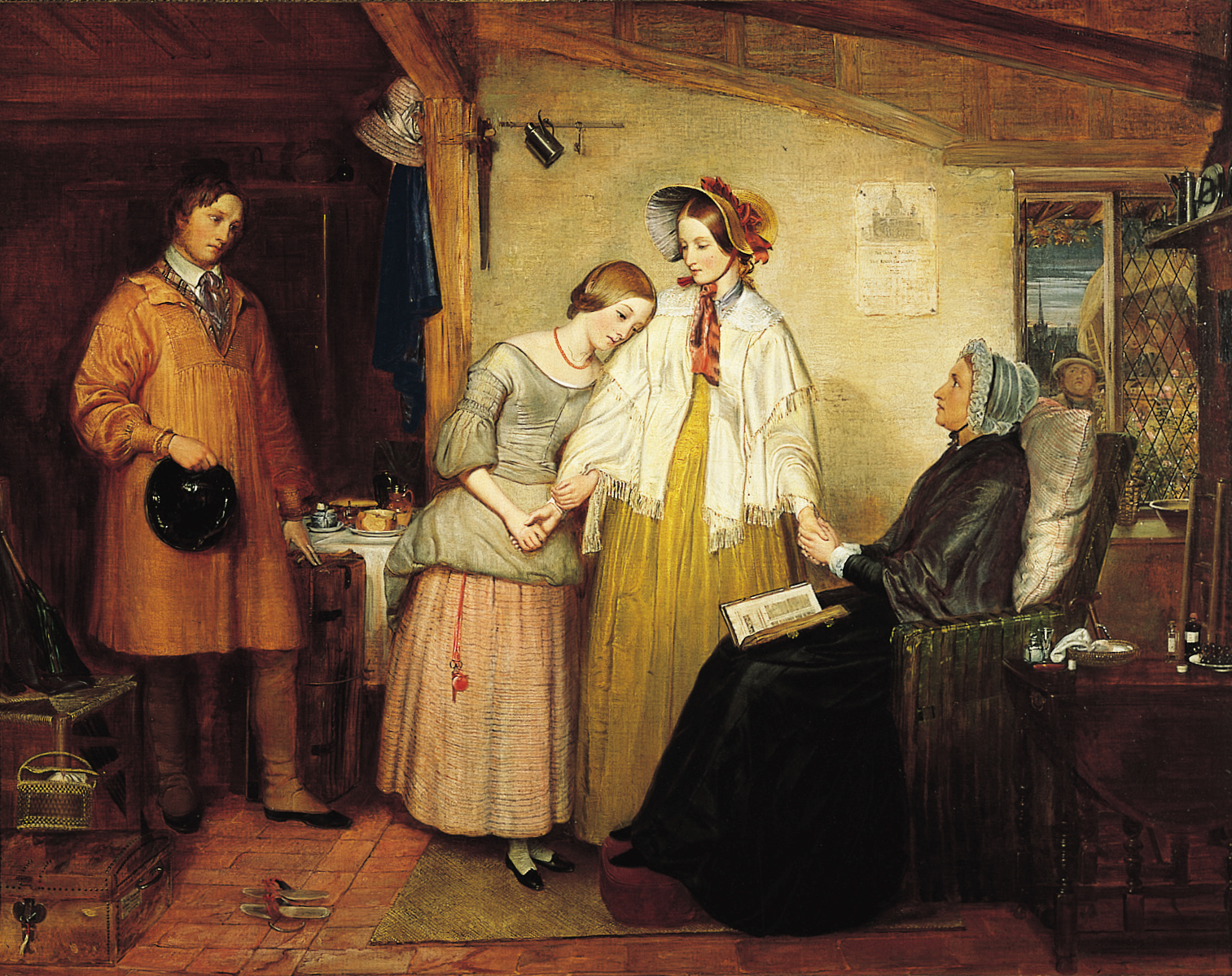
- Artist: Richard Redgrave
- Year: 1843
- Type: Oil on canvas, genre painting
- Dimensions: 78.7 cm × 101 cm (31.0 in × 40 in)
- Location: Speed Art Museum, Louisville

Going into Service (also known as Going to Service) is an 1843 oil painting by the British artist Richard Redgrave. The picture shows a young woman bidding farewell to her family as she prepares to leave her rural home to become a servant in London. The image of Saint Paul's on the wall hints at the dangers that might befall her in the capital, particularly prostitution which was associated with the area.

Redgrave was known for his genre paintings featuring sympathetic depictions of working class life in the early Victorian era. A particular focus of his was of woman who had been forced by economic circumstances to leave their family to take up employment. The painting was displayed at the Royal Academy Exhibition of 1843 held at the National Gallery in London. Today it is part of the collection of Speed Art Museum in Louisville, Kentucky.

== Bibliography ==
- Alexander, Lynn Mae. Women, Work, and Representation: Needlewomen in Victorian Art and Literature. Ohio University Press, 2003.
- Fletcher, Pamela. The Victorian Painting of Modern Life. Taylor & Francis, 2024.
- Ward, Chloe. Art and Action: Painting for Social Change in Victorian England. Oxford University Press, 2026.
