= Andromache (disambiguation) =

Andromache is a figure from Greek mythology, the wife of Hector. Andromache may also refer to:

== Mythology ==
- Andromache, queen of the Amazons
- Andromache, one of the would-be sacrificial victims of Minotaur

== Literary works ==
- Andromache, a play by Euripides
- Andromaque, a play by Jean Racine
- Andromache, a 1932 German opera by Herbert Windt

== Other uses ==
- 175 Andromache, an asteroid
- HMS Andromache, the name of four ships of the British Royal Navy, and one planned one
- French ship Andromaque
- Andromache, Queensland, a locality in Australia
- Andromache (singer), Greek singer, representative of Cyprus in the Eurovision Song Contest 2022
- Andromache Karakatsanis, Canadian jurist
- Mount Andromache, Alberta, Canada
- Andromakhe, a genus of characin fish from South America
- Andromache "Andy" of Scythia, a character in The_Old_Guard_(2020_film)

== See also ==
- Andromeda (disambiguation)
