= Andromeda =

Andromeda most commonly refers to:

- Andromeda (mythology), a princess from Greek mythology
- Andromeda (constellation), a region of the Earth's night sky
- The Andromeda Galaxy, an astronomical object within the constellation

Andromeda may also refer to:

== Artistic works ==
=== Fine art ===
- Andromeda (painting), an 1869 painting by Edward Poynter
- Andromeda Chained to the Rocks, a 1631 painting by Rembrandt
- Andromeda (Rodin), an 1889 sculpture by Auguste Rodin

=== Literature ===
- Andromeda (play), lost mythological tragedy by Euripides from 412 BC
- Andromeda (novel), 1957 science fiction novel by Ivan Yefremov

=== Music ===
==== Classical ====
- "Andromède", a symphonic poem written by French composer Augusta Holmès, 1883
- Andromeda, a cantata for the Three Choirs Festival by English composer Charles Harford Lloyd, 1886
- Andromeda, a dramatic cantata for soloists, chorus and orchestra by English composer Cyril Rootham, 1905
- List of operas based on the Andromeda myth (contains many additional operas titled Andromeda)

==== Pop ====
- Andromeda (English band), a 1960s psychedelic rock band from Britain, or their eponymous debut album
- Andromeda (Swedish band), a 2000s progressive metal band from Sweden
- Love Outside Andromeda, a 2000s indie rock band from Australia, initially simply, Andromeda
- Andromeda, 1983 album and track by Harry Thumann
- Andromeda, 2010 EP by Erra
- "Andromeda" (Elodie song), 2020
- "Andromeda" (Gorillaz song), 2017
- "Andromeda" (Weyes Blood song), 2019
- "Andromeda" (Lelek song), 2026
- "Andromeda", a song by Chicane Behind the Sun, 2000
- "Andromeda", a song by Dethklok from Dethalbum III, 2012
- "Andromeda", a song by Ensiferum from Thalassic, 2020
- "Andromeda", a song by Hopesfall from The Satellite Years, 2002
- "Andromeda", a song by Mechina, 2011
- "Andromeda", a song by Omega Lithium from Dreams in Formaline, 2009
- "Andromeda", a song by Zuckerbaby from the self-titled album, 1997

=== Other artistic works ===
- Andromeda (TV series), science fiction series created by Gene Roddenberry
- Mass Effect: Andromeda, the fourth installment in the main Mass Effect series released in 2017

=== Fictional characters ===
- Andromeda (Marvel Comics), female, Atlantian, mermaid-like character in the Marvel Universe
- Andromeda (Pantheon), more obscure, female Marvel Comics character
- Andromeda Shun, male Bronze Saint character in the Saint Seiya universe
- Andromeda Tonks, a character in the Harry Potter series of novels and films
- Laurel Gand, female Legion of Super-Heroes member in the DC Comics Universe
- Andromeda, a female character in the 2011 first-person shooter video game Conduit 2
- Andromeda, a female character in the Disney animated TV series Big City Greens

== Botany ==
- Andromeda (plant) (bog rosemary), a small, slender shrub native to Northern peat bogs
- Colloquially, Pieris (fetterbushes), several large, broad-leafed, mountain shrubs

== People ==
- Andrómeda, Mexican professional wrestler
- Cassandro, Mexican professional wrestler, used the ring name Andrómeda in their early career
- Andromeda Dunker, narrator of House Hunters

== Ships ==
- HMS Andromeda, several warships of the Royal Navy
- Andromeda (1819), a 408-ton English ship
- Andromeda-class attack cargo ship
- Andromeda (2015), a luxury yacht
- Andromeda, a Bavaria C50 sailing boat investigated by German authorities for its role in the Nord Stream pipelines sabotage

== Other uses ==
- Andromeda (wine), produced by California winemaker Sean Thackrey
- Andromeda (Chinese astronomy)

== See also ==
- A for Andromeda, a 1961 BBC television science fiction drama serial written by Fred Hoyle and John Elliot
  - The Andromeda Breakthrough, a 1962 BBC sequel to the 1961 serial
  - A come Andromeda, a 1971 Italian remake of the 1961 serial
  - A for Andromeda (2006 film), a BBC remake of the 1961 serial
- Andromache (disambiguation)
