= An Algerian Lady Hawking =

Painting by Horace Vernet

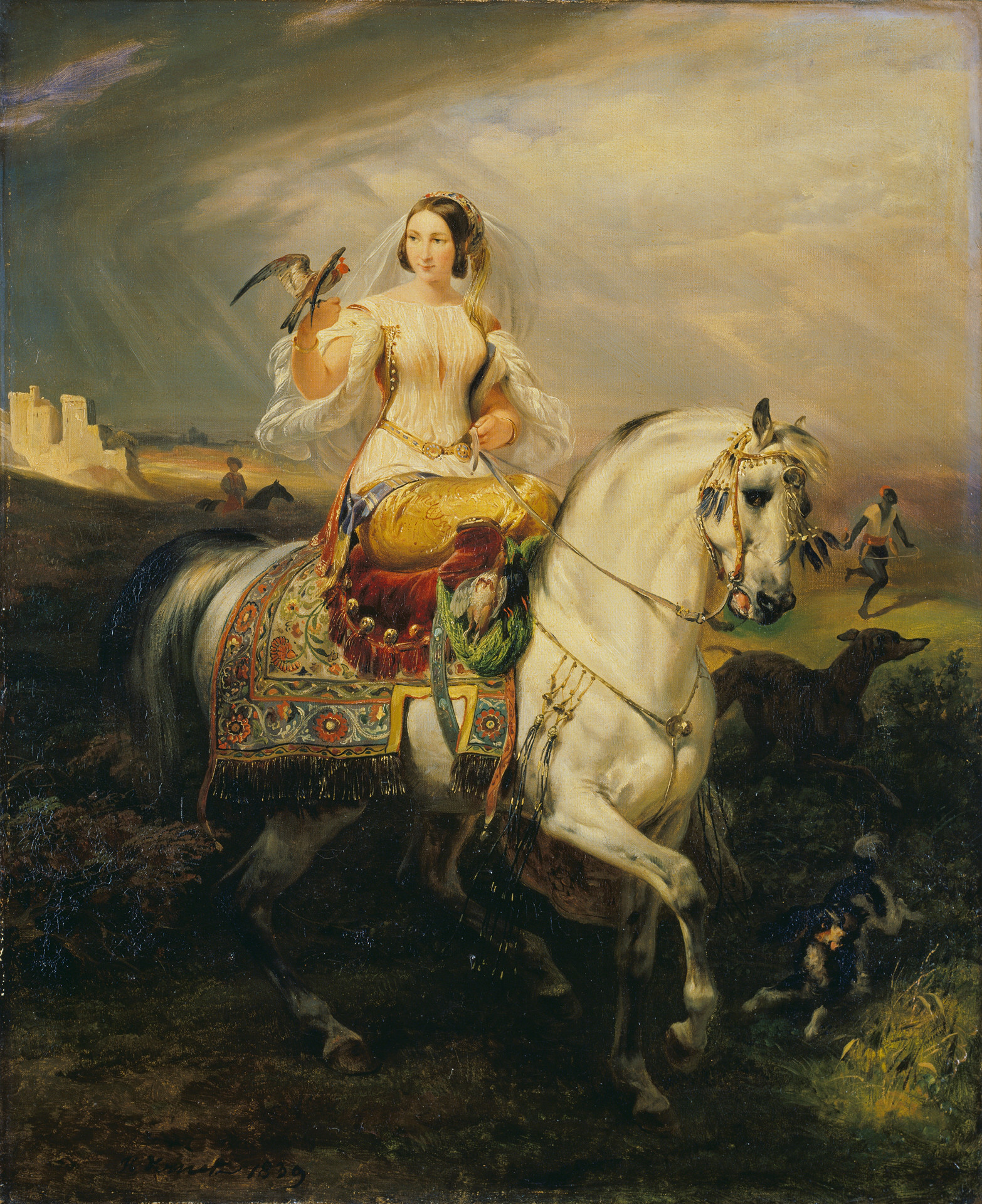
- Artist: Horace Vernet
- Year: 1839
- Type: Oil on canvas, genre painting
- Dimensions: 60.5 cm × 49.4 cm (23.8 in × 19.4 in)
- Location: Wallace Collection; London

An Algerian Lady Hawking is an 1839 genre painting by the French artist Horace Vernet. It was one of a number of paintings he produced inspired by his visits to North Africa during the French Conquest of Algeria. It depicts a wealthy lady on horseback hawking, a popular form of hunting, against the Sahara desert backdrop. Vernet was a prominent painter of the Romantic movement, who produced a number of popular Orientalist works.

An engraving based on the work was exhibited at the Salon of 1841. The painting is now in the Wallace Collection in London, having been acquired by the Marquess of Hertford.

== Bibliography ==
- Ingamells, John. The Wallace Collection: French Nineteenth Century. Trustees of the Wallace Collection, 1985.
- Harkett, Daniel & Hornstein, Katie (ed.) Horace Vernet and the Thresholds of Nineteenth-Century Visual Culture. Dartmouth College Press, 2017.
- Ruutz-Rees, Janet Emily. Horace Vernet. Scribner and Welford, 1880.
