= Andromeda (comics) =

Andromeda, in comics, may refer to:

- Andromeda (DC Comics), the codename of the Legion of Super-Heroes member Laurel Gand
- Andromeda (Marvel Comics), a native of Atlantis and member of the Defenders
- Andromeda (Pantheon), a member of the superhero family the Pantheon
- Andromeda Shun, a Bronze Saint in Saint Seiya

== See also ==
- Andromeda (disambiguation)
