= Entry of the Crusaders in Constantinople =

1840 oil painting by Eugène Delacroix

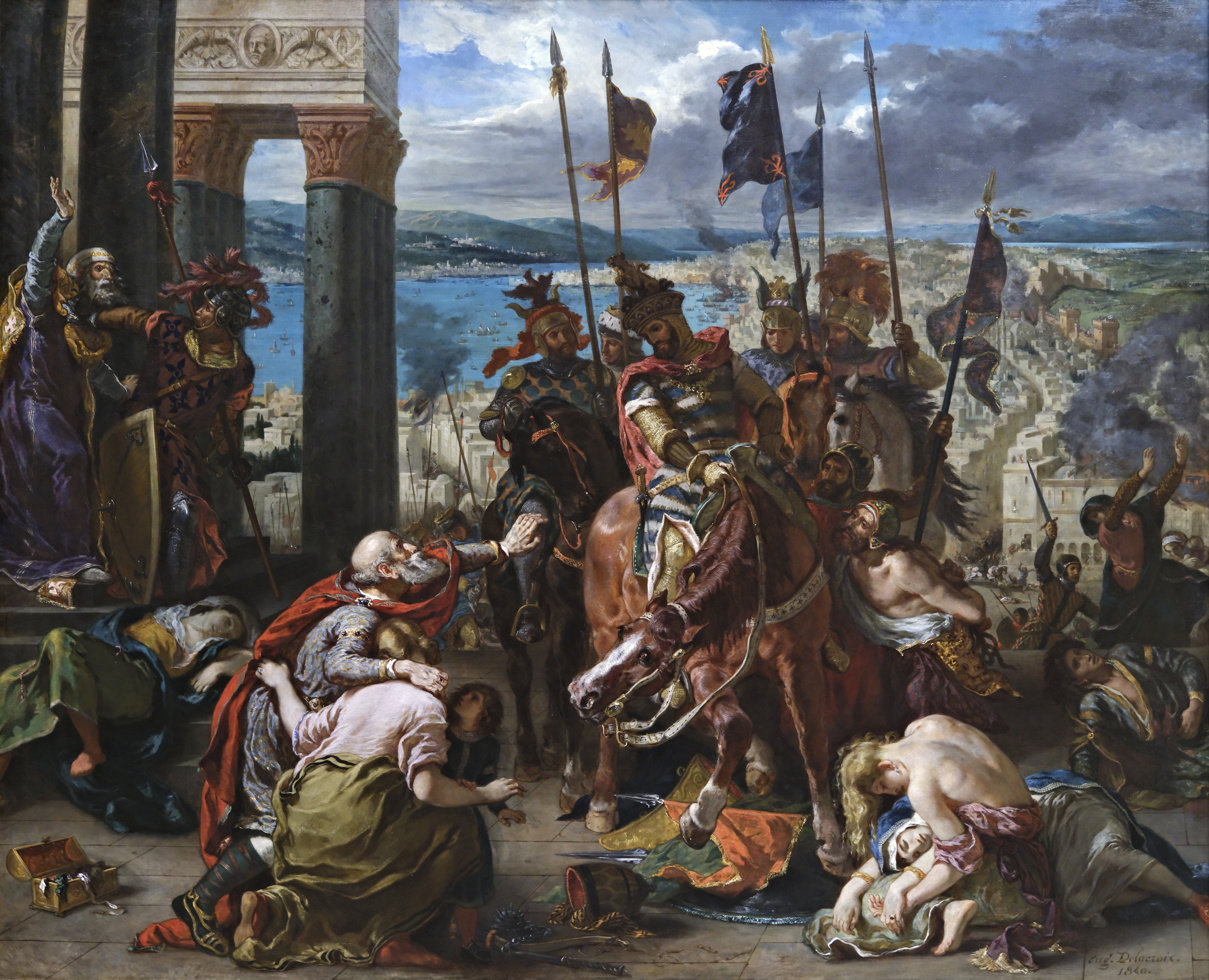
- Artist: Eugène Delacroix
- Year: 1840
- Type: Oil on canvas
- Dimensions: 498 cm × 410 cm (196 in × 160 in)
- Location: Louvre; Paris

The Entry of the Crusaders in Constantinople (Entrée des Croisés à Constantinople) or The Crusaders Entering Constantinople is a large painting by the French painter Eugène Delacroix. It was commissioned by Louis-Philippe in 1838, and completed in 1840. It was exhibited at the Salon of 1841. Painted in oil on canvas, it is in the collection of the Louvre, in Paris.

== History and description ==
Delacroix's painting depicts a brutal episode of the armed expedition known as Fourth Crusade (12 April 1204), in which a Crusaders army abandoned their plan to invade Muslim Egypt and Jerusalem, and instead sacked the Christian (Eastern Orthodox) city of Constantinople, the capital of the Byzantine Empire. The painting shows Baldwin I of Constantinople at the head of a procession through the streets of the city following the assault; on all sides are the city's inhabitants who beg for mercy or have been murdered.

The painting's luminosity and use of colour owes much to Delacroix's study of the Old Masters, such as Paolo Veronese. The painting was exhibited in the Salon of 1841, where the painterly romanticism of its style was controversial; Le Constitutionnel deplored "the confused and strangled composition, the dull earthy colours and the lack of definite contours", but Baudelaire appreciated the work's "abstraction faite".

The painting is used on the cover of the album "The IVth Crusade" by British death-metal band Bolt Thrower.
