= French ship Andromaque =

Seven ships of the French Navy have borne the name Andromaque in honour of Andromache, wife of Hector, daughter of Eetion, and sister to Podes.

== Ships ==
- Andromaque (1777), a 40-gun Nymphe-class frigate.
- Andromaque (1797), a galley, captured from the Venetians.
- Andromaque (1811), a 44-gun frigate.
- Andromaque (1841), a 56-gun frigate.
- Andromaque (1915), an Amphitrite-class submarine launched in 1915 and struck in 1926.
- Andromaque (1939, Q203), an Aurore-class submarine. Never finished
- Andromaque (1939), an auxiliary patrol boats, formerly the tug Fourmi I.

== See also ==
- HMS Andromache

== Notes and references ==
=== Bibliography ===
- Roche, Jean-Michel (2005). Dictionnaire des bâtiments de la flotte de guerre française de Colbert à nos jours. Vol. 1. Group Retozel-Maury Millau. p. 41. ISBN 978-2-9525917-0-6. OCLC 165892922.
- Roche, Jean-Michel (2005). Dictionnaire des bâtiments de la flotte de guerre française de Colbert à nos jours. Vol. 2. Group Retozel-Maury Millau. p. 39. ISBN 978-2-9525917-0-6. OCLC 165892922.
