= Jewish Wedding in Morocco =

Painting by Eugène Delacroix

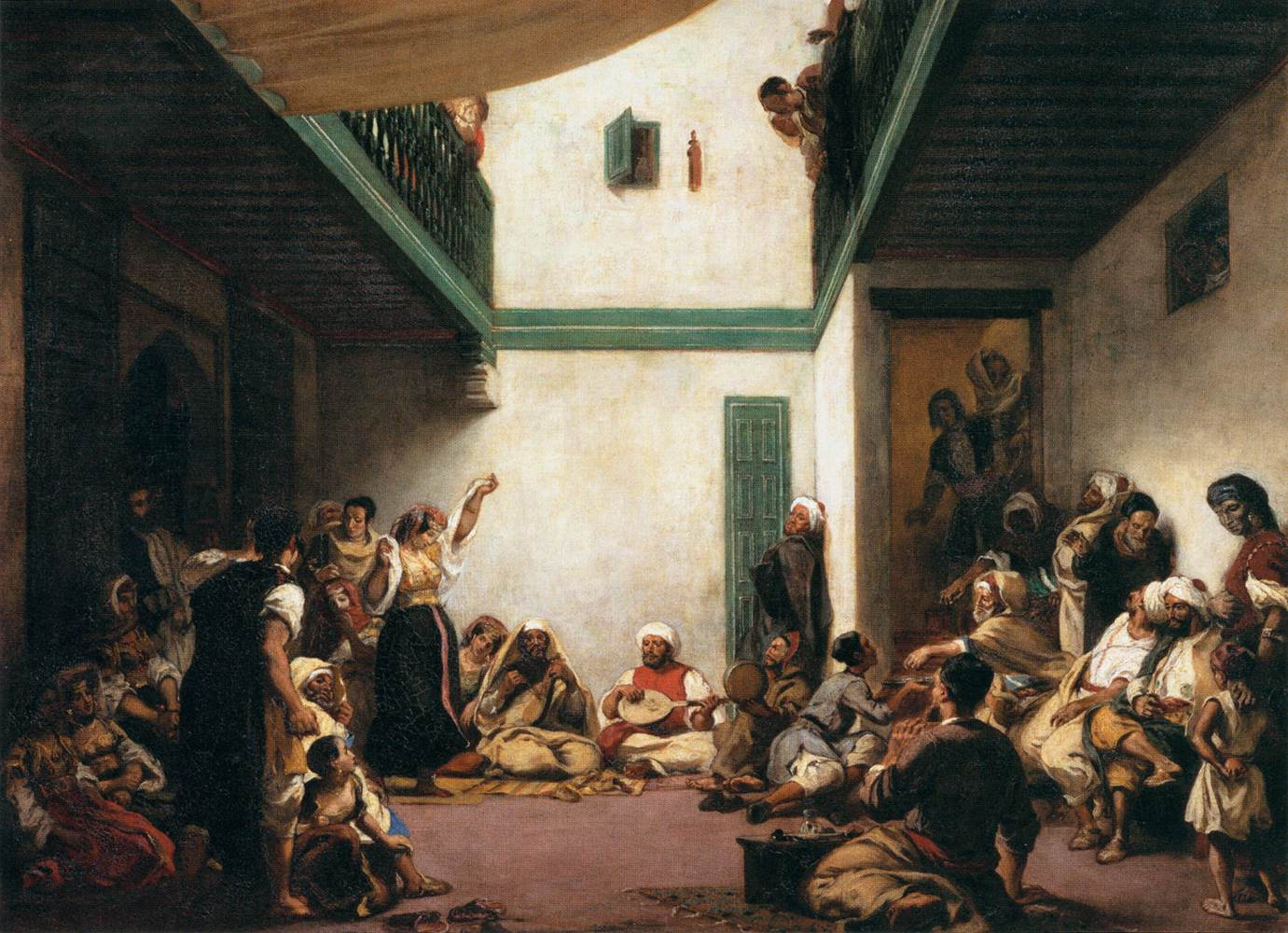
- Artist: Eugène Delacroix
- Year: 1839
- Type: Oil on canvas, genre painting
- Dimensions: 105 cm × 140 cm (41 in × 55 in)
- Location: Louvre, Paris

Jewish Wedding in Morocco (French: Noce juive dans le Maroc) is an 1839 genre painting by the French artist Eugène Delacroix. It depicts a Jewish wedding taking place in the Sultanate of Morocco. A leading figure of the Romantic movement, Delacroix visited North Africa and produced a number of Orientalist pictures inspired by his travels. Delacroix had witnessed a wedding ceremony and sketched Moroccan Jews while in Tangier in 1832.

The painting was exhibited at the Salon of 1841 held at the Louvre in Paris. It is in the collection of the Louvre, having been acquired by the heir to the French throne Philippe, Duke of Orléans the same year. Around 1875 the Impressionist Pierre-Auguste Renoir produced a copy of the painting for the industrialist Jean Dollfus. Renoir was regarded by many, including himself, as a natural successor to Delacroix.

== Bibliography ==
- Allard, Sébastien & Fabre, Côme. Delacroix. Metropolitan Museum of Art, 2018.
- Boime, Albert. Art in an Age of Counterrevolution, 1815-1848. University of Chicago Press, 2004.
- Noon, Patrick & Riopelle, Christopher. Delacroix and the Rise of Modern Art. National Gallery Company, 2015.
