= The Shipwreck of Don Juan =

Painting by Eugène Delacroix

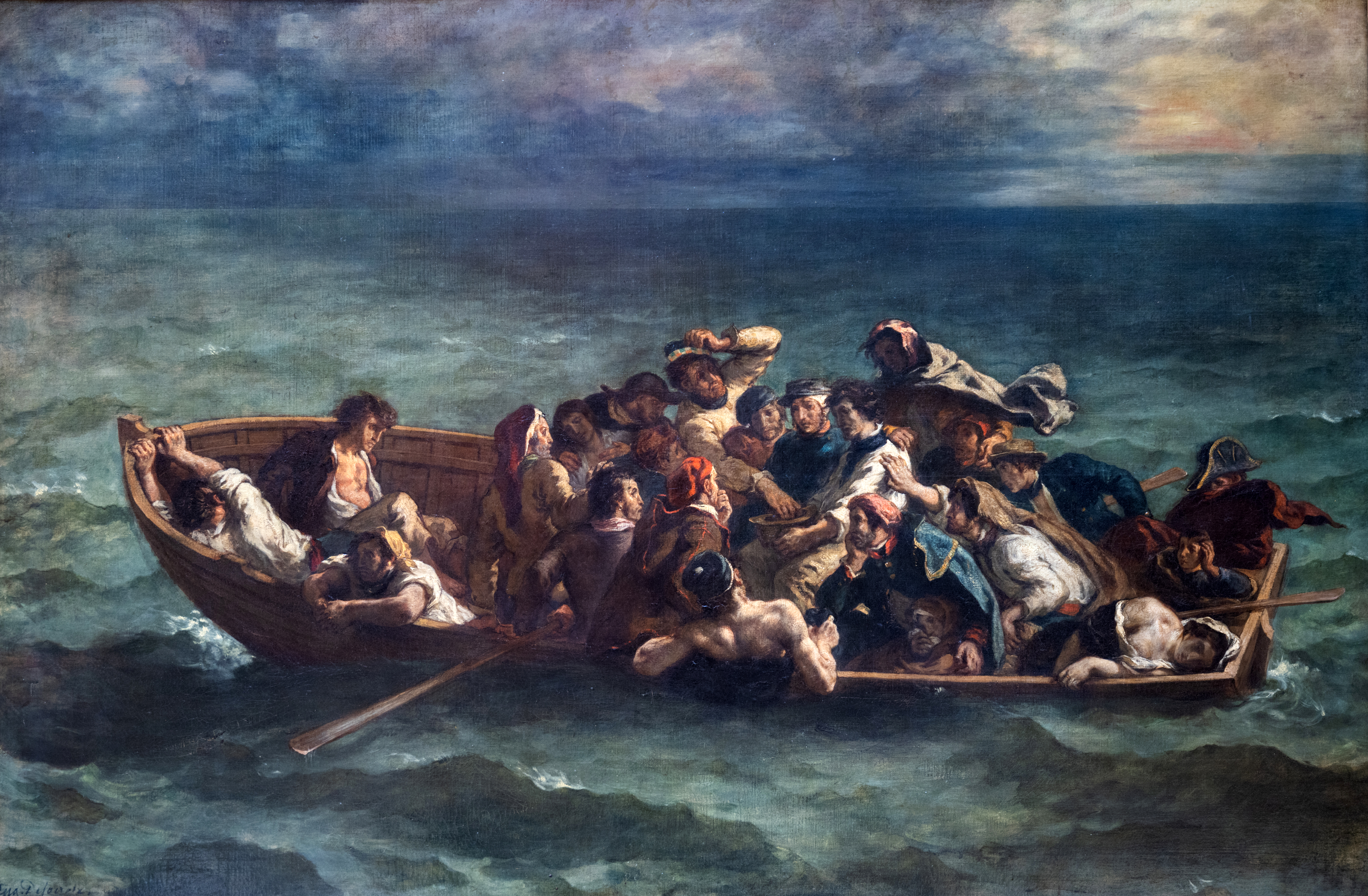
- Artist: Eugène Delacroix
- Year: 1840
- Type: Oil on canvas
- Dimensions: 135 cm × 196 cm (53 in × 77 in)
- Location: Louvre, Paris

The Shipwreck of Don Juan is an 1840 oil painting by the French artist Eugène Delacroix. It depicts a scene from Lord Byron's epic poem Don Juan. Don Juan and others are adrift in the Mediterranean in a ship's boat following a shipwreck.

It was exhibited at the Salon of 1841. Today it is in the collection of the Louvre in Paris, having been acquired in 1883. A much earlier sketch of the scene by Delacroix is held at the Victoria and Albert Museum in London.

== Bibliography ==
- Allard, Sébastien & Fabre, Côme. Delacroix. Metropolitan Museum of Art, 2018.
- Alston, Isabella. Delacroix. TAJ Books International, 2014.
- Davies, Elspeth. Portrait of Delacroix. Pentland Press, 1994.
- Néret, Gilles. Delacroix. Taschen, 2000.
