= Andromeda Chained to the Rocks =

1630 painting by Rembrandt

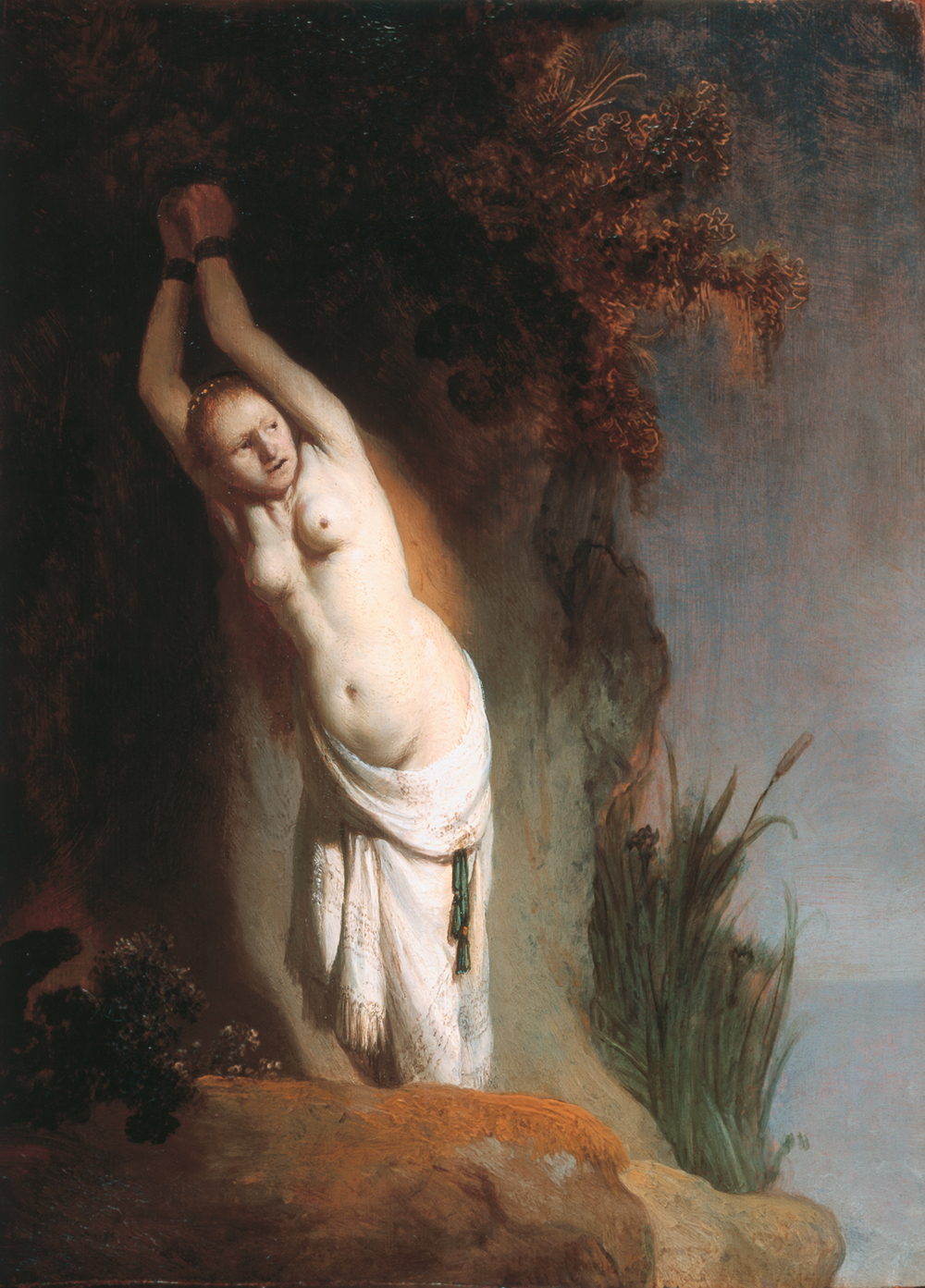
- Artist: Rembrandt
- Year: c. 1630
- Medium: Oil on panel
- Dimensions: 34 cm × 24.5 cm (13 in × 9.6 in)
- Location: Mauritshuis, The Hague

Andromeda Chained to the Rocks (1630) is a 34 cm × 24.5 cm (13.4 in × 9.6 in) oil-on-panel painting by the Dutch Golden Age painter Rembrandt. It is exhibited now in the Mauritshuis, The Hague, Netherlands. Andromeda is Rembrandt's first full-length mythological female nude history painting and is taken from a story in Ovid's Metamorphoses.

== Mythology ==
In Metamorphoses, Andromeda is the daughter of an Ethiopian king and queen, Cepheus and Cassiopeia. Cassiopeia was very boastful about her beauty, and asserted that she was more beautiful than Juno, the queen of the gods and the Nereids. Insulted by Cassiopeia's assertions, Neptune sent a sea monster to the Ethiopian coast. Neptune then could only be appeased upon the sacrifice of Andromeda, the king's beautiful virgin daughter, to the sea monster. Andromeda was chained naked to rocks by the coast, awaiting the sea monster. Perseus, passing by, noticed the beautiful girl and made a deal with her parents that he would save her, should he be allowed to have her hand in marriage. The king and queen agreed and Andromeda was spared.

== Damsel in distress ==
This painting depicts a classic example of the damsel in distress. In this theme a beautiful young woman is placed in a perilous situation, usually involving a monster or being trapped in captivity. The damsel can then only be rescued by a hero, whom she usually ends up marrying. In this painting, Andromeda has a distressed look on her face as she is completely shackled and unable to move. Although Perseus does not make an appearance in this painting, in similar works we can see Perseus being portrayed in a heroic and graceful light, shown through the use of warm colors and heroic poses.

== Depiction of beauty ==
Many artists such as Titian have depicted this story by showing Andromeda, her rescuer Perseus, and the sea monster all in the same composition. Her beauty as described in her source material can be seen in some of these other works, along with Perseus' role as her rescuer. In this work, Rembrandt shies away from classical conventions by showing her not as a glamorous beauty but as a frightened naturalistic looking girl. No other figure is included, but her alarmed look out of the picture space to the right creates narrative tension. The painting is an example of Rembrandt's rejection of idealized beauty. Since he did not believe true beauty existed naturally, he painted women as he saw them; naturally imperfect and flawed.

Rembrandt's subsequent nude mythological paintings from this period Diana Bathing and Danaë show his evolving portrayal of the nude.

Other Depictions of Andromeda

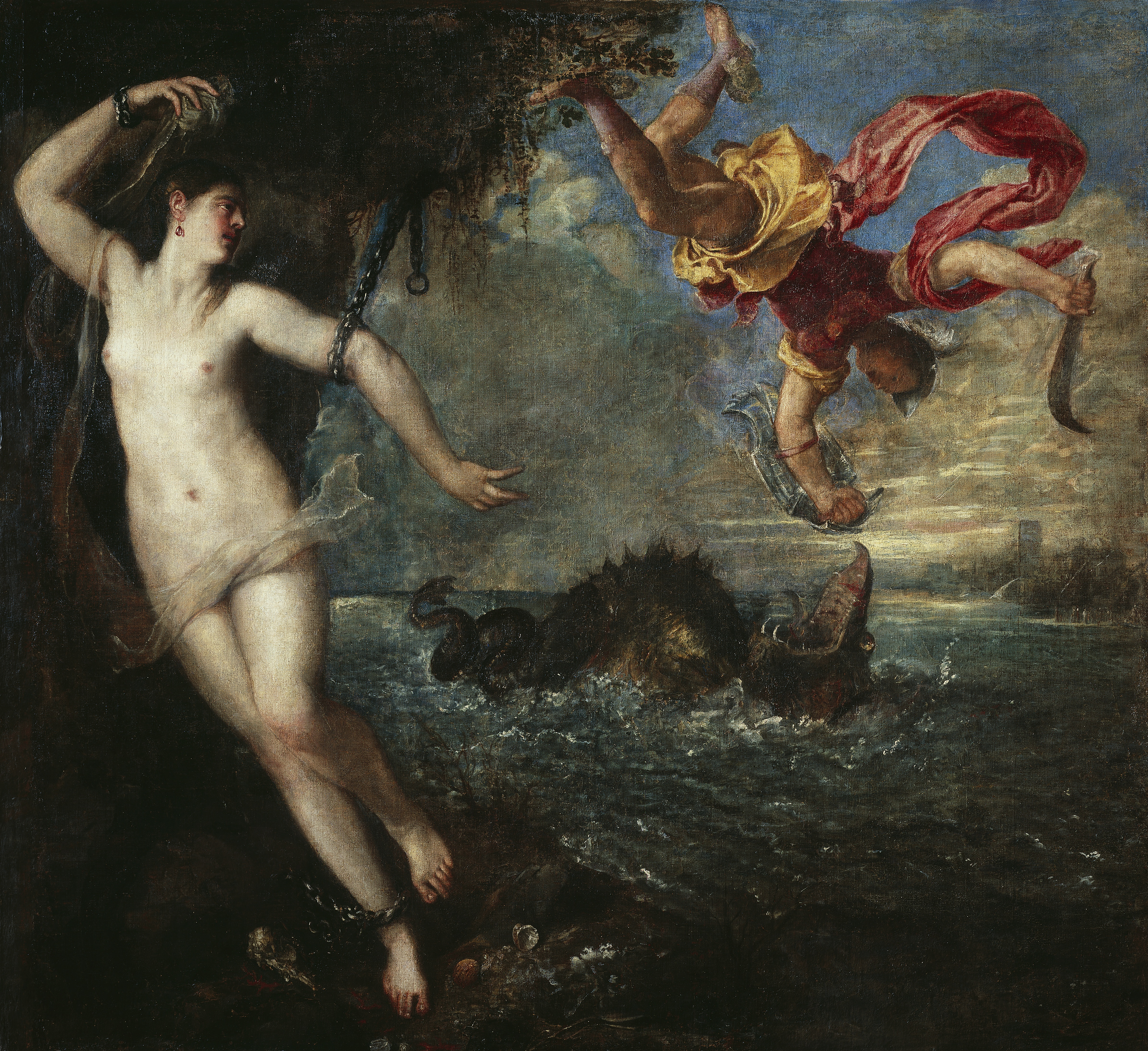
Perseus and Andromeda, Titian, Wallace Collection

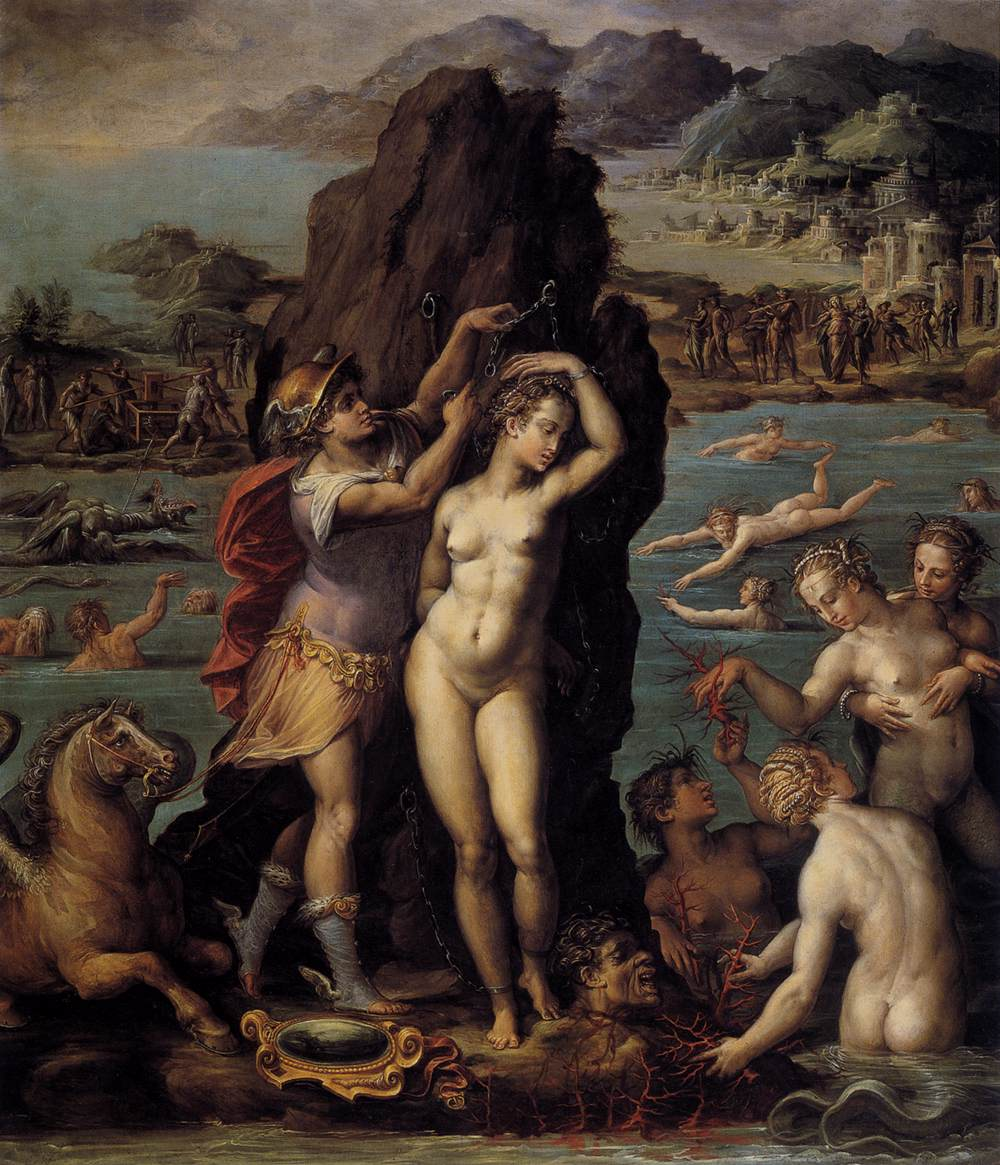
Giorgio Vasari, Perseus and Andromeda, 1570

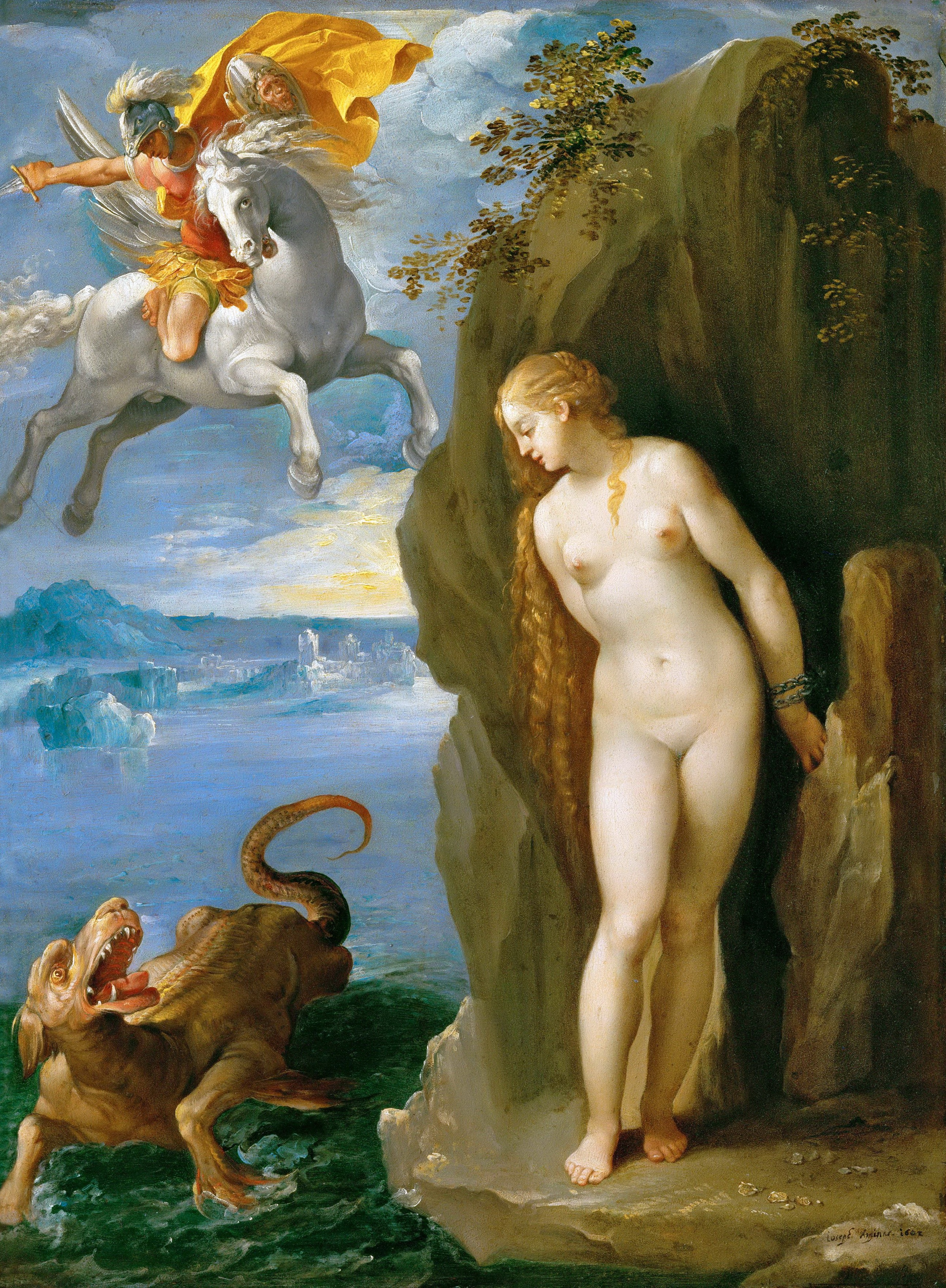
Perseus and Andromeda by Giuseppe Cesari (1568–1640)

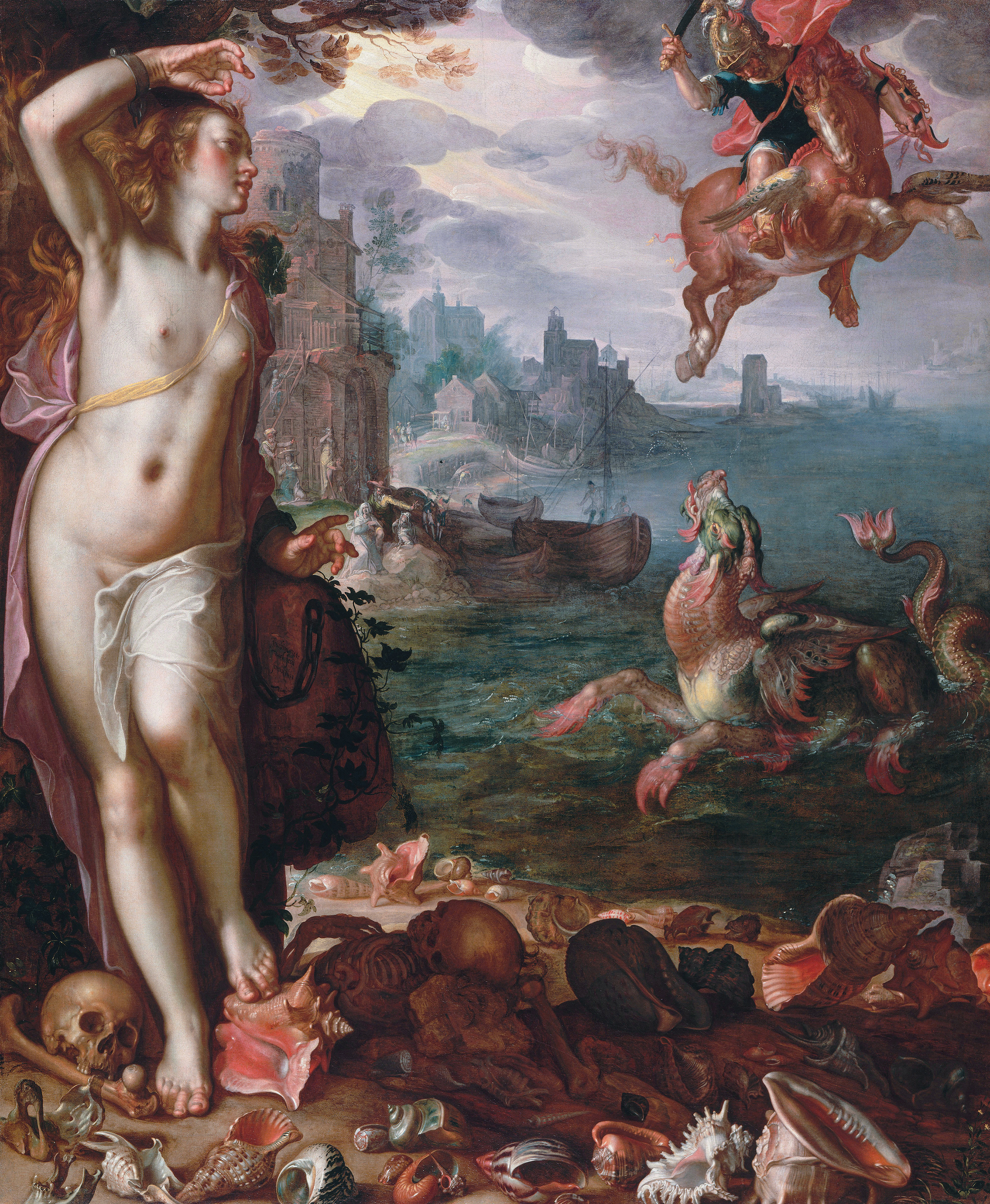
Joachim Wtewael, Louvre

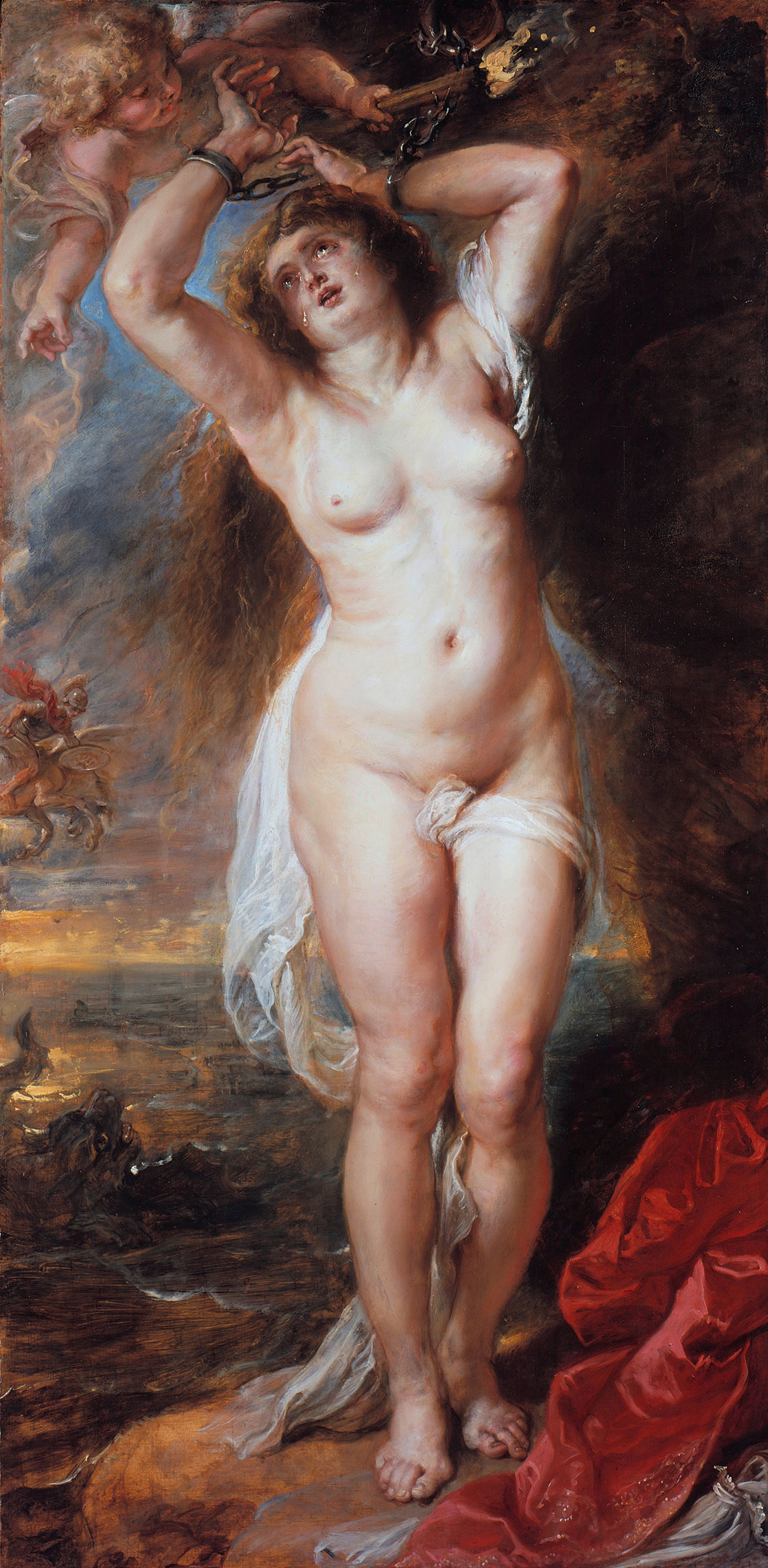
Perseus Freeing Andromeda by Rubens

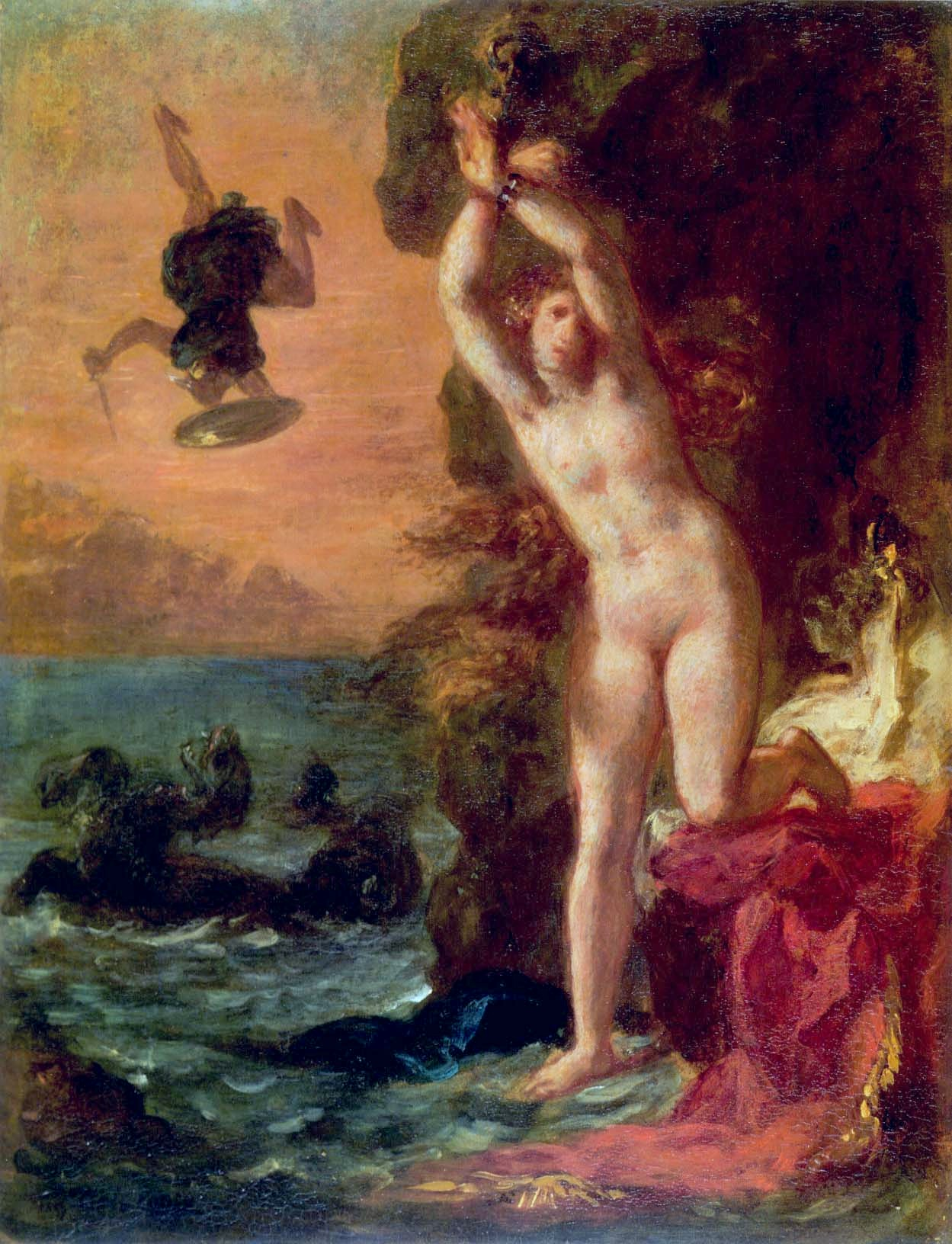
Perseus and Andromeda by Eugène Delacroix

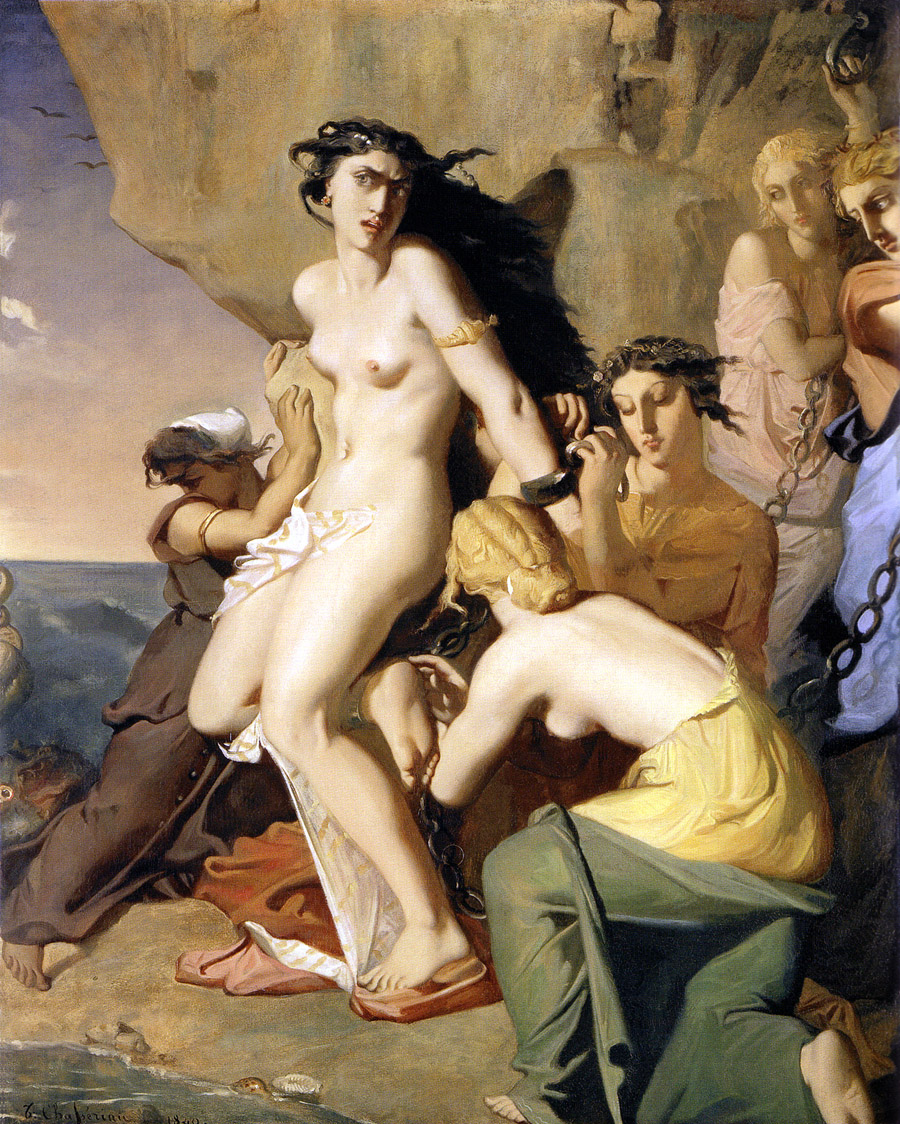
Andromeda Chained to the Rock by the Nereids (1840) by Théodore Chassériau

== See also ==
- List of paintings by Rembrandt
