= Salon of 1841 =

1841 art exhibition in Paris

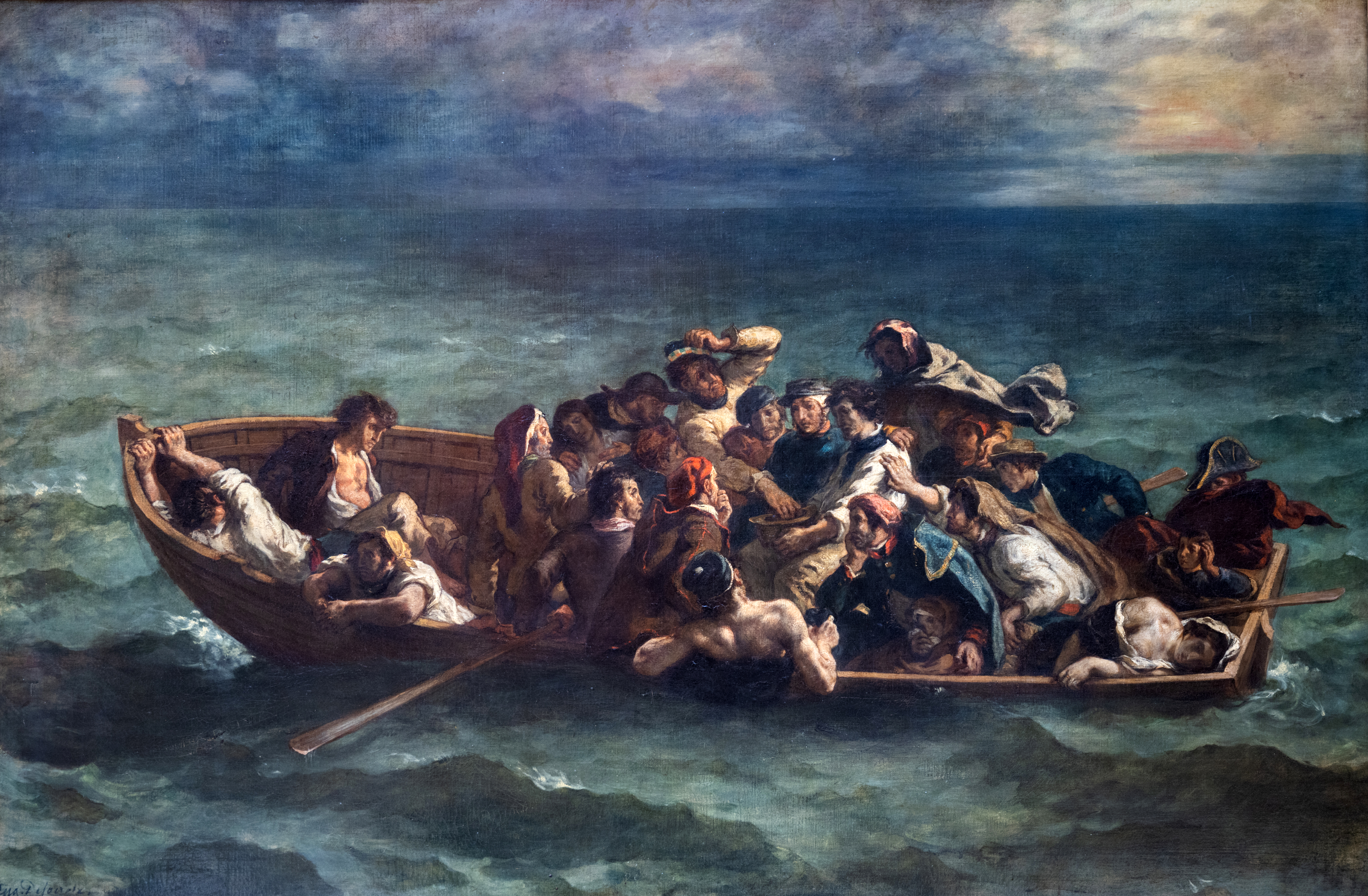
The Shipwreck of Don Juan by Eugène Delacroix

The Salon of 1841 was an art exhibition staged at the Louvre in Paris. Held during the July Monarchy it was the annual edition of the Salon, the country's premier art exhibition. Overseen by the Académie des Beaux-Arts, it featured entries from a variety of fields including painting, sculpture and architecture. It was preceded by the Salon of 1840 and followed by the Salon of 1842.

Eugène Delacroix, one of the leading romantic painters submitted three works: the historical Entry of the Crusaders in Constantinople, The Shipwreck of Don Juan based on a poem of Lord Byron and an Orientalist genre painting Jewish Wedding in Morocco. Théodore Chassériau presented Andromeda Chained to the Rock by the Nereids while François-Auguste Biard entered Magdalena Bay. The German portraitist Franz Xaver Winterhalter displayed a painting of the Duchess of Nemours, the daughter-in-law of Louis Philippe I.

Théodore Rousseau, a landscape painter of the Barbizon school, submitted The Avenue of Chestnut Trees.

== Gallery ==
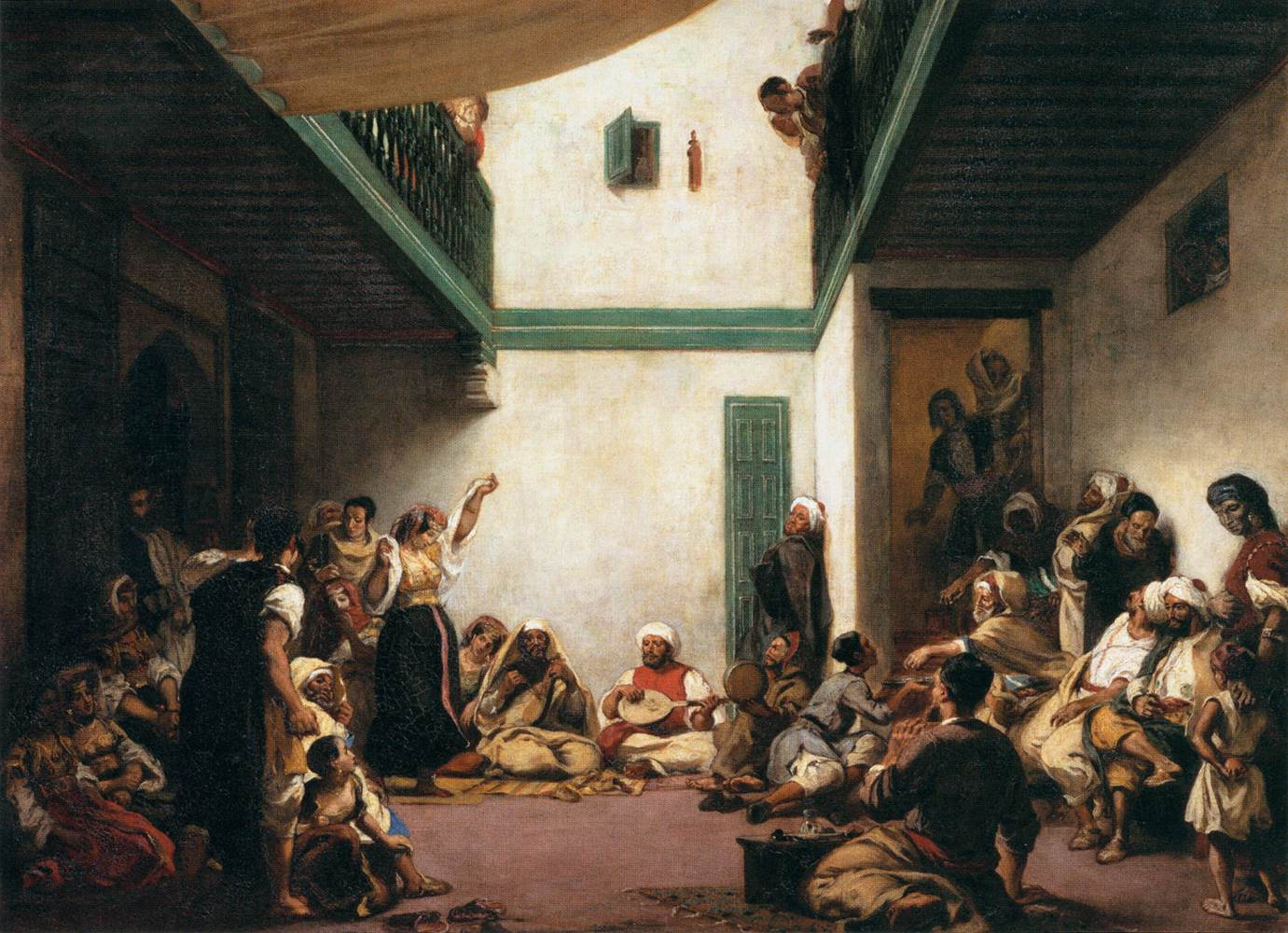
Jewish Wedding in Morocco by Eugène Delacroix

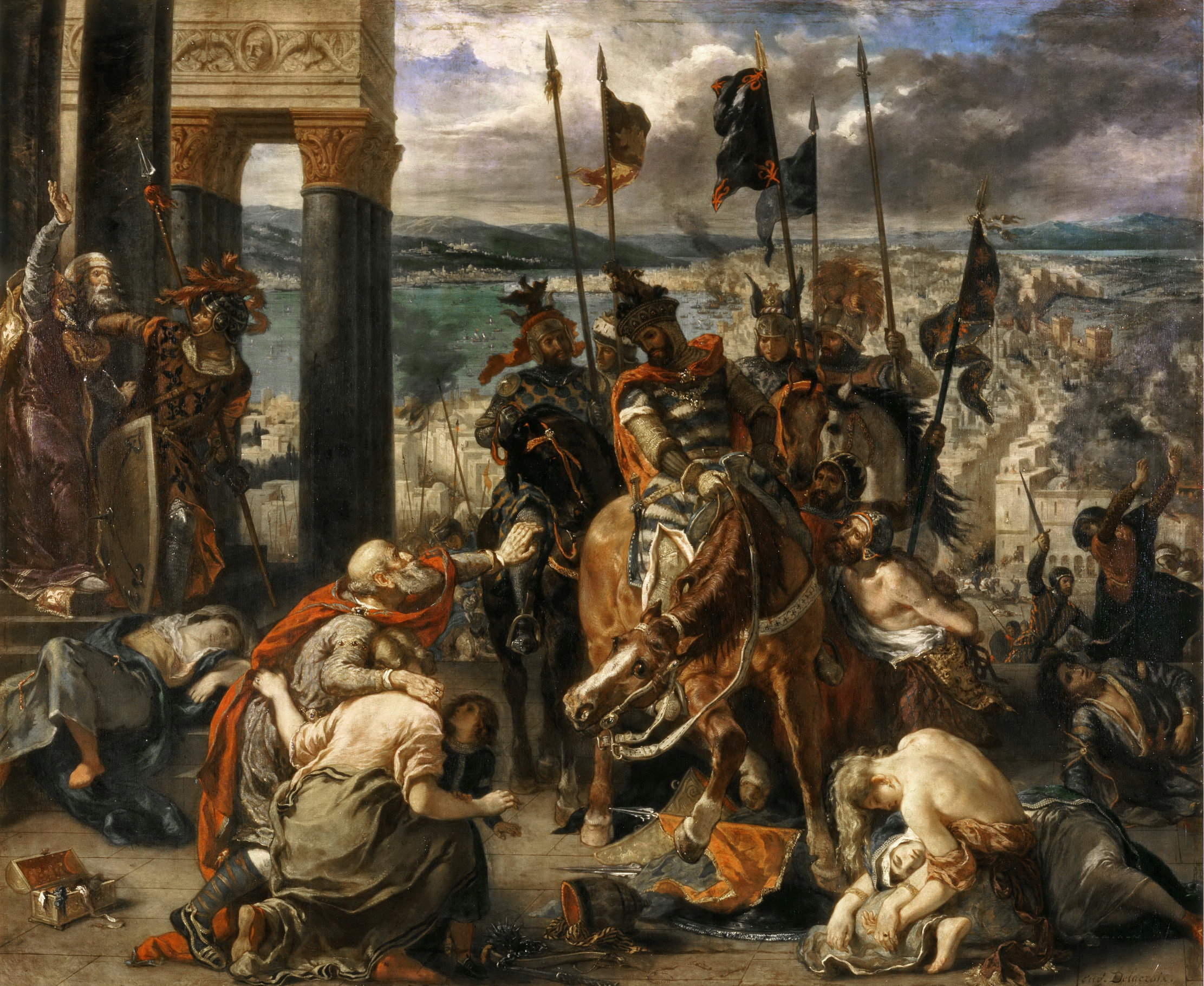
Entry of the Crusaders in Constantinople by Eugène Delacroix

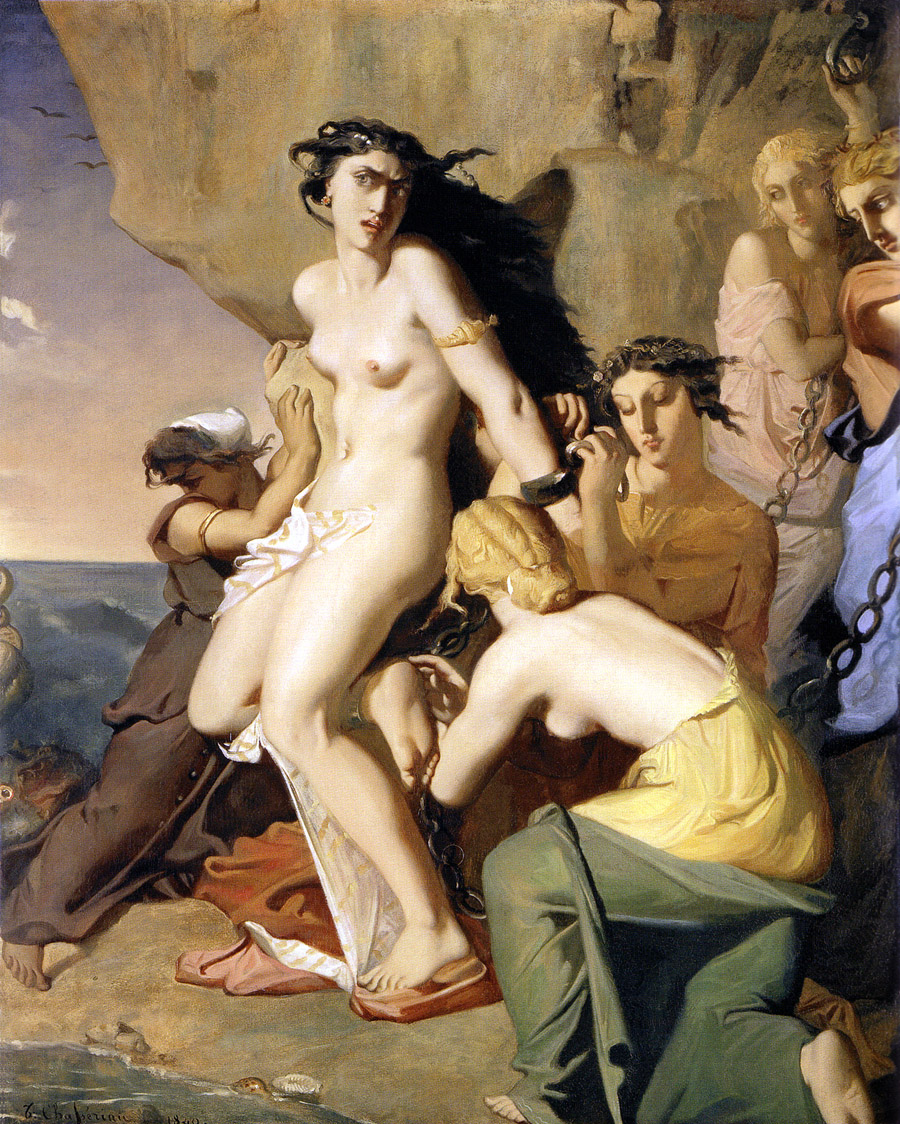
Andromeda Chained to the Rock by the Nereids by Théodore Chassériau

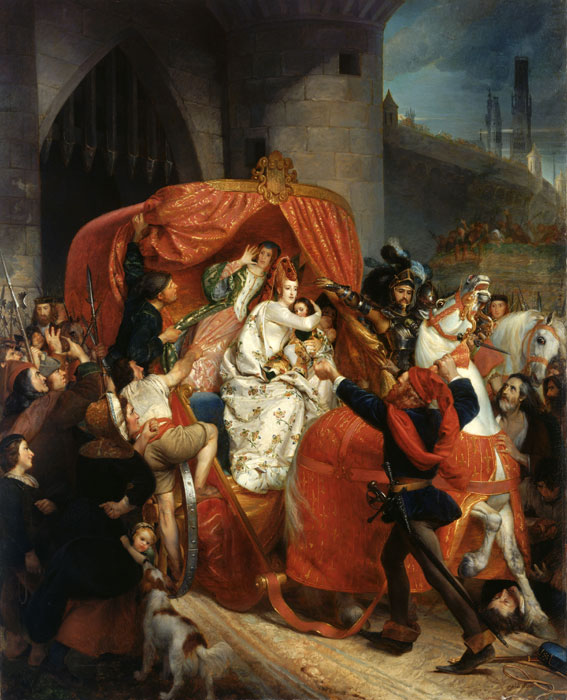
La Duchesse de Bourgogne arrêtée aux portes de Bruges by Sophie Frémiet

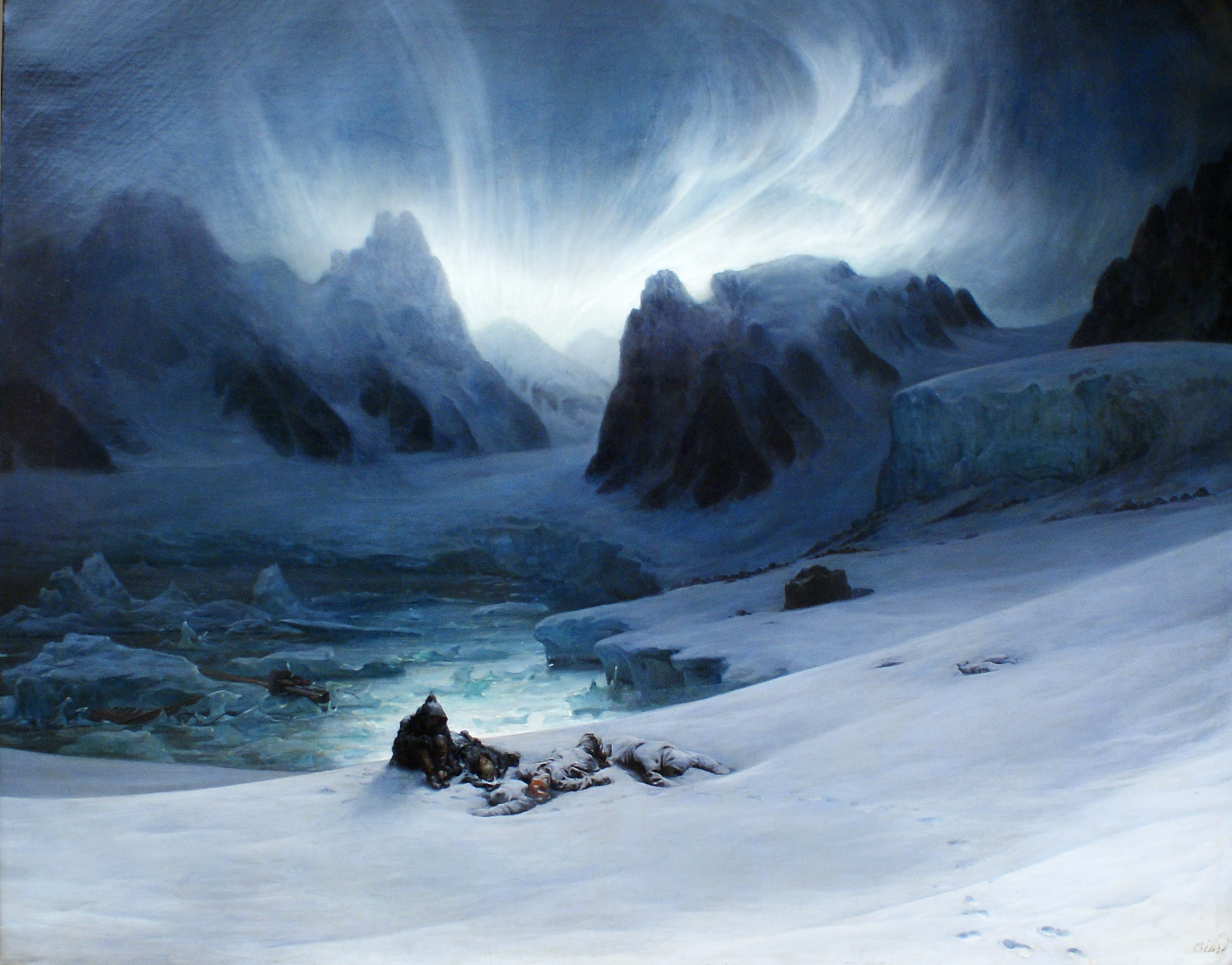
Magdalena Bay by François-Auguste Biard

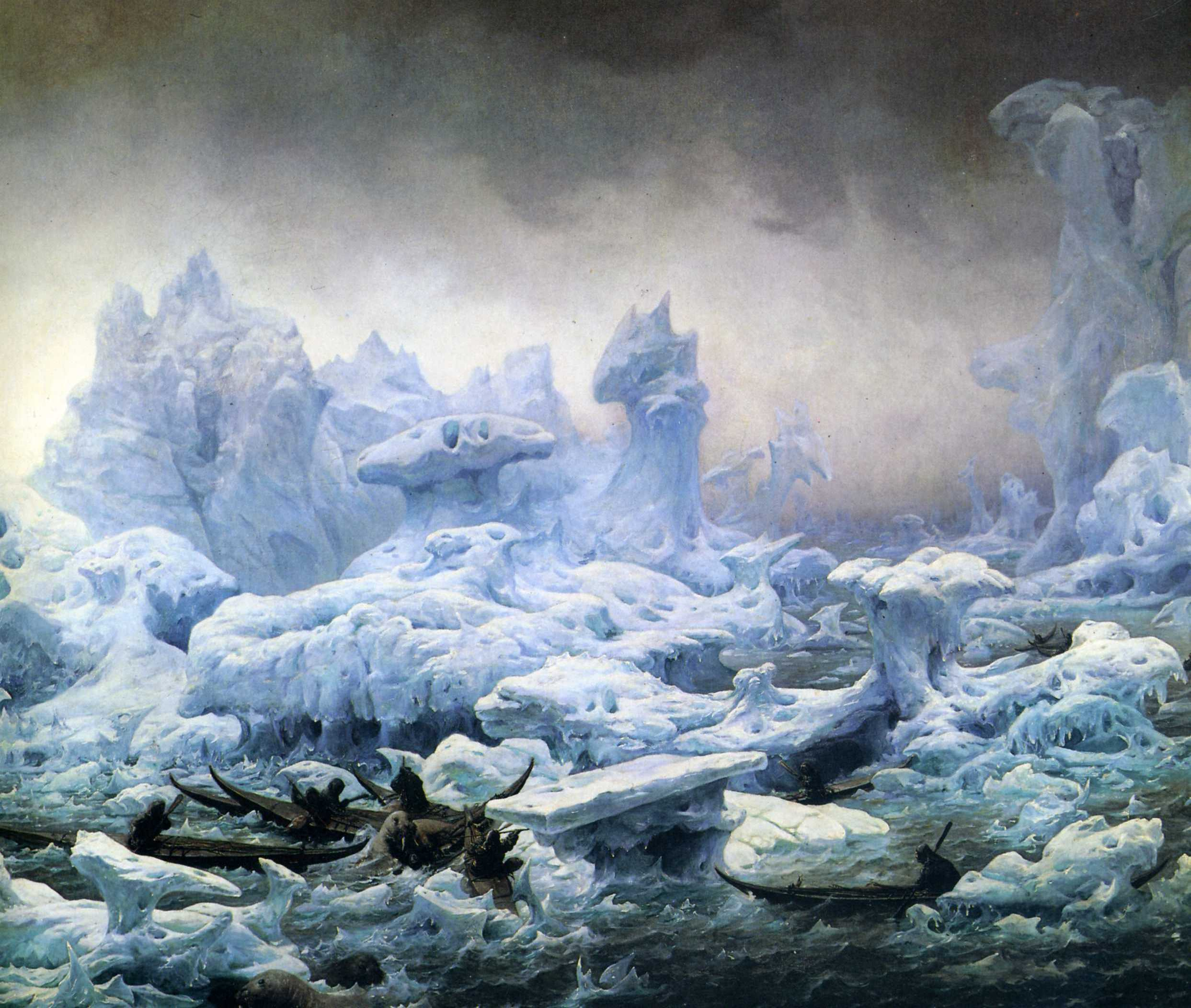
Greenlanders Hunting Walruses in the Arctic Sea by François-Auguste Biard

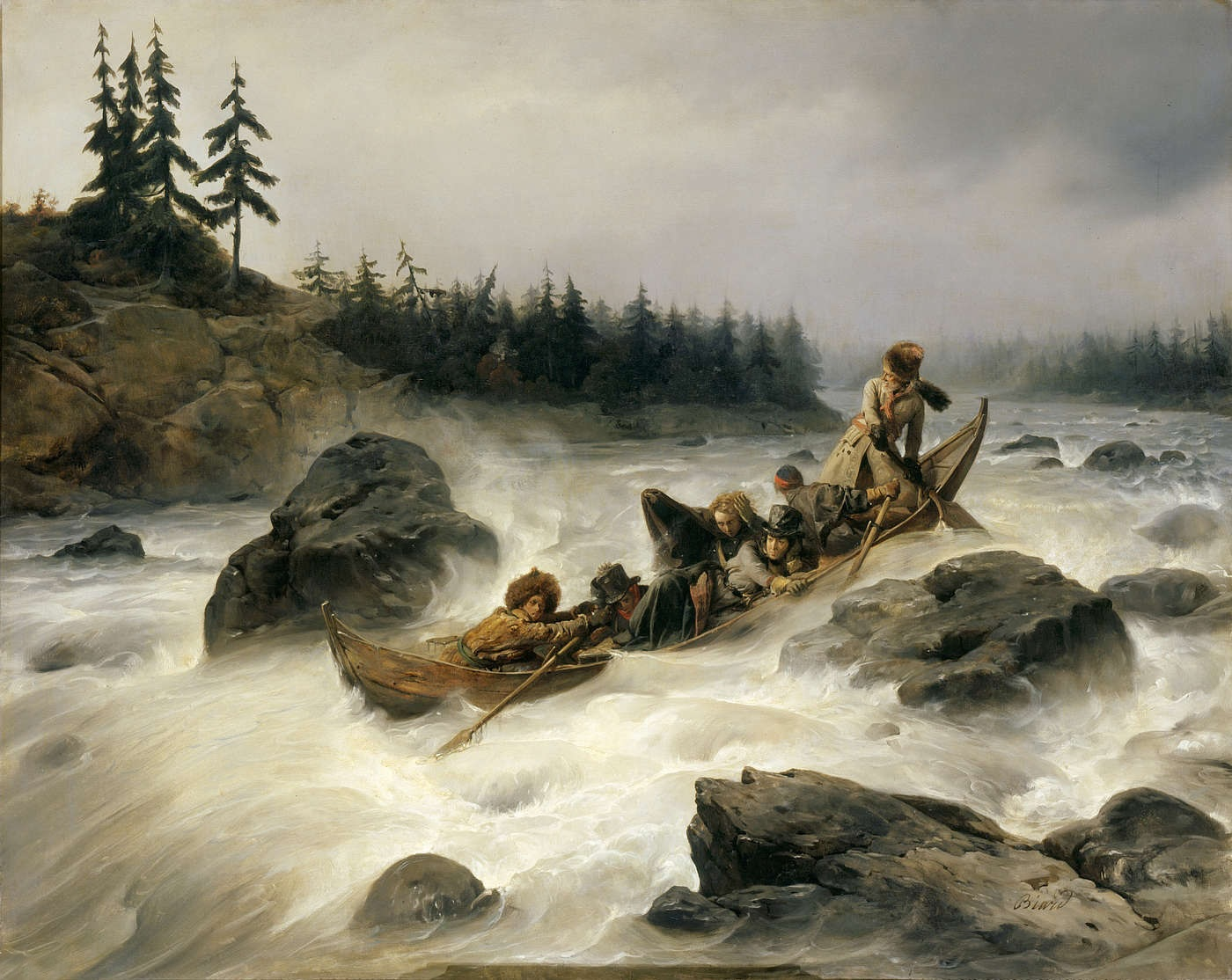
The Duke of Orleans Riding Down the Great Rapid of Eijanpaikka by François-Auguste Biard

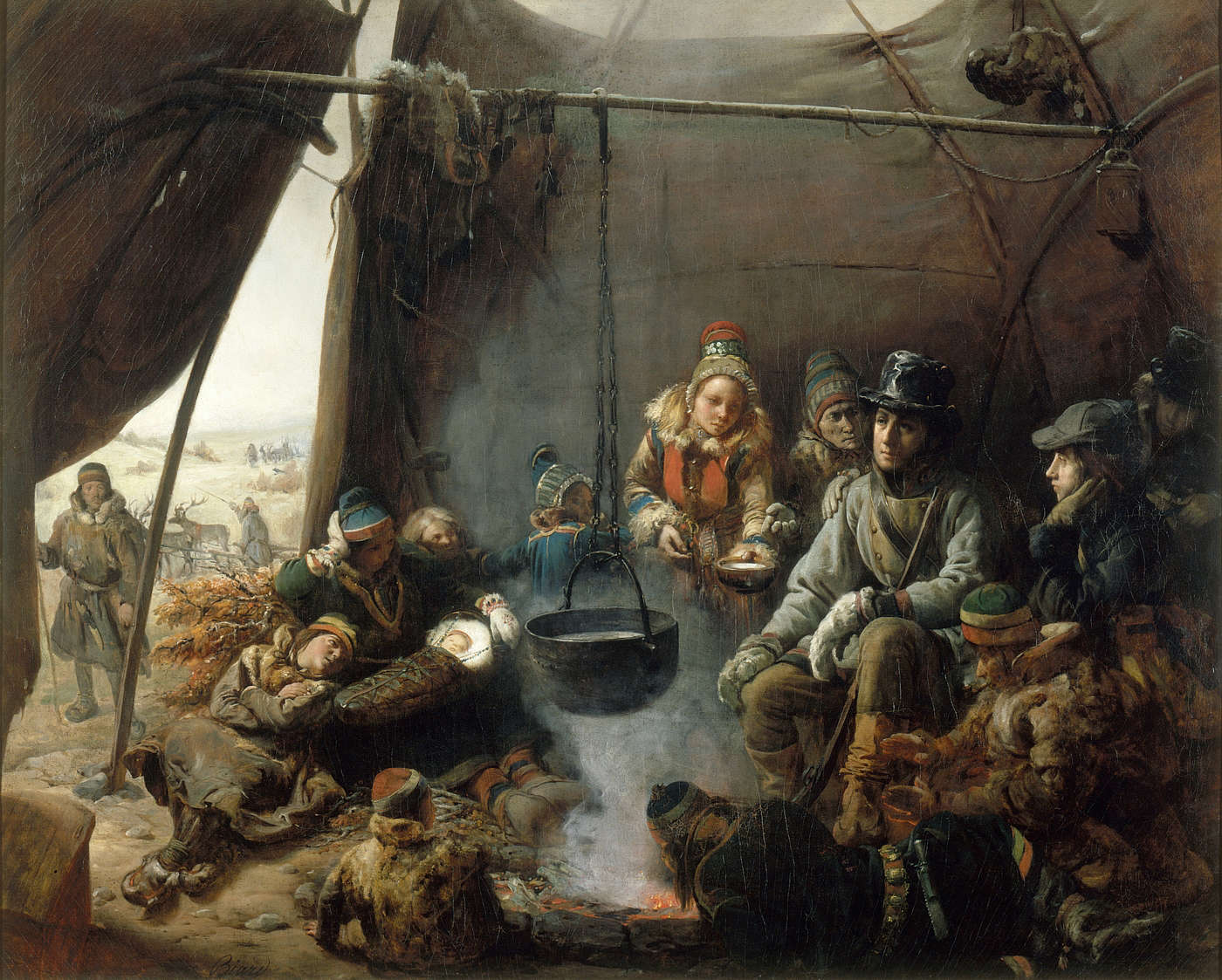
The Duke of Orleans in a Lap Encampment by François-Auguste Biard

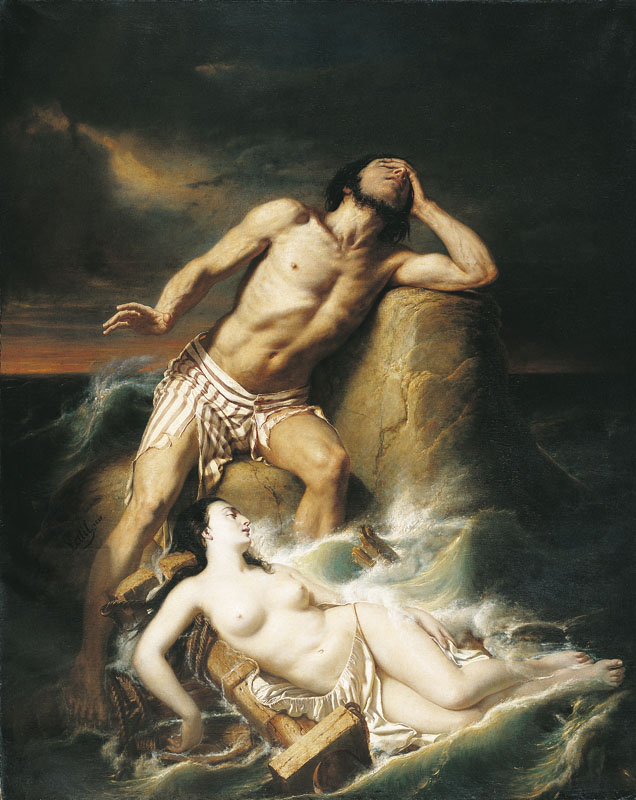
Episode de l'histoire des naufrages by François Vincent Latil

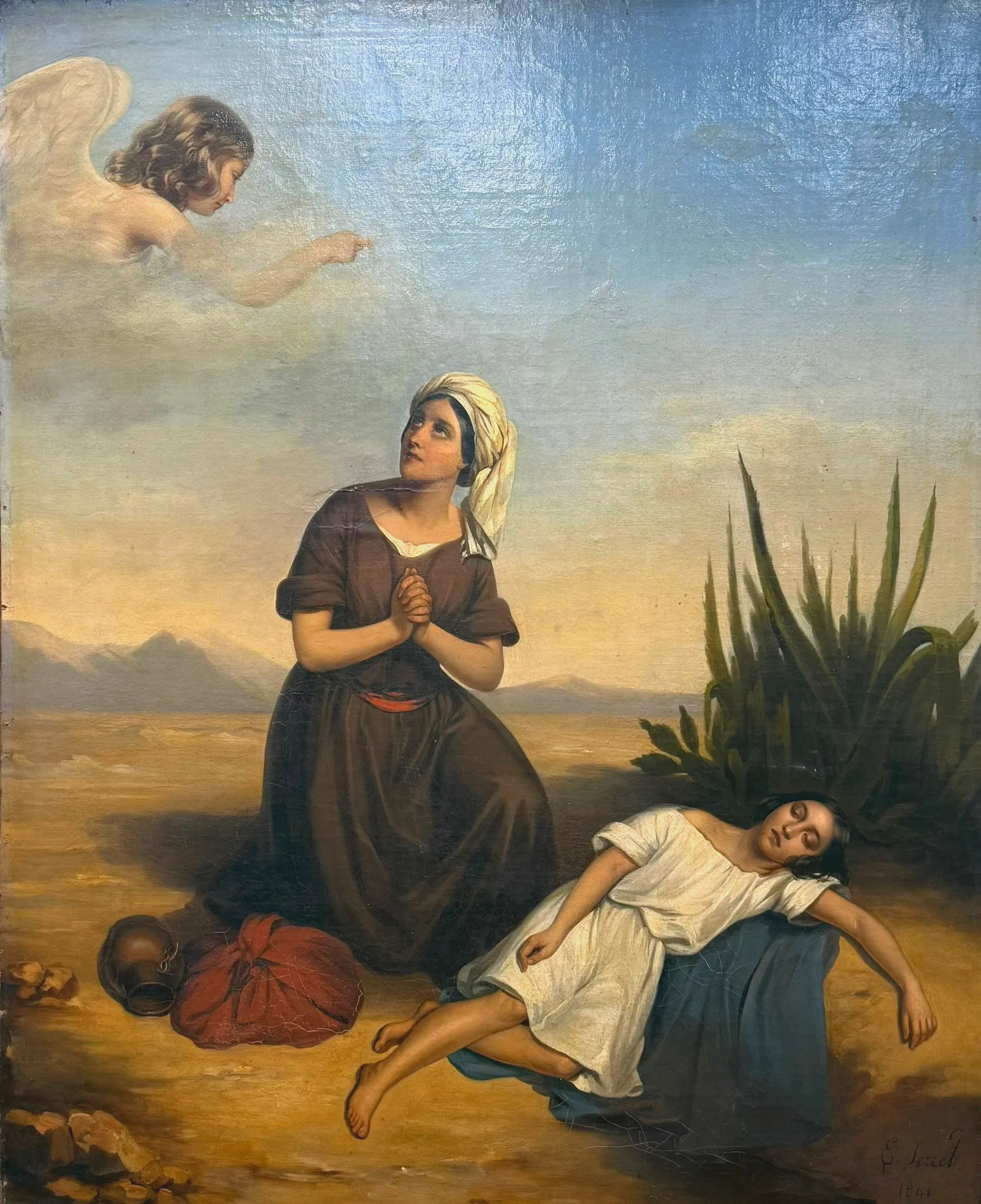
Hagar and Ishmael in the Desert by Marie-Ernestine Serret

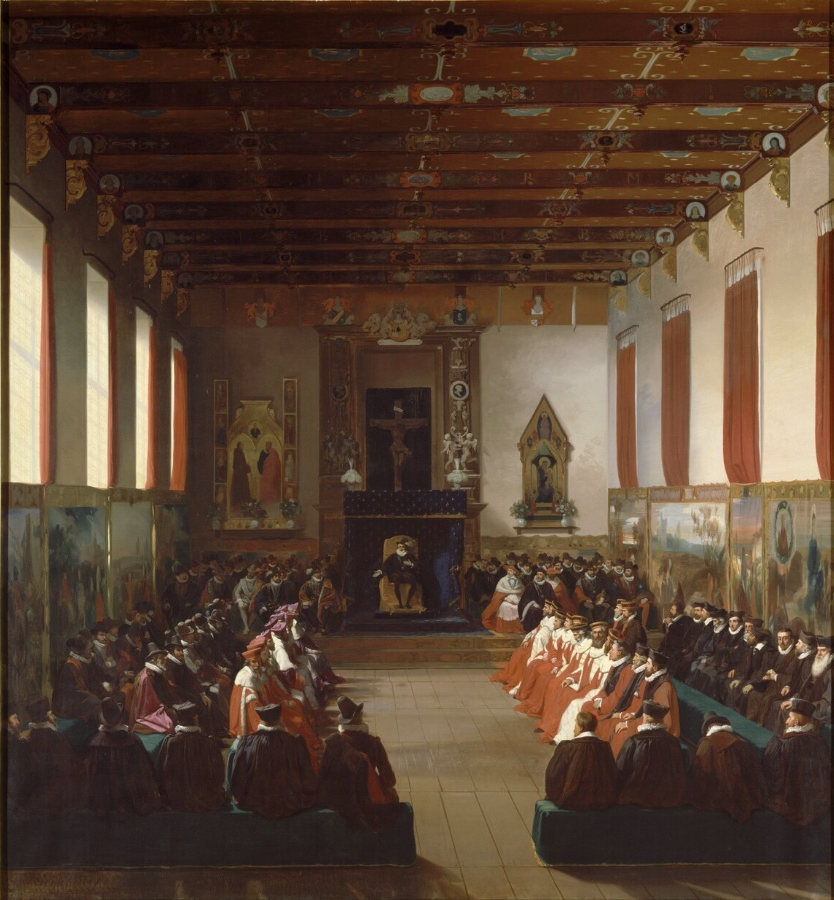
Assembly of Notables convened at Rouen by Henri IV, 1596 by Jean Alaux

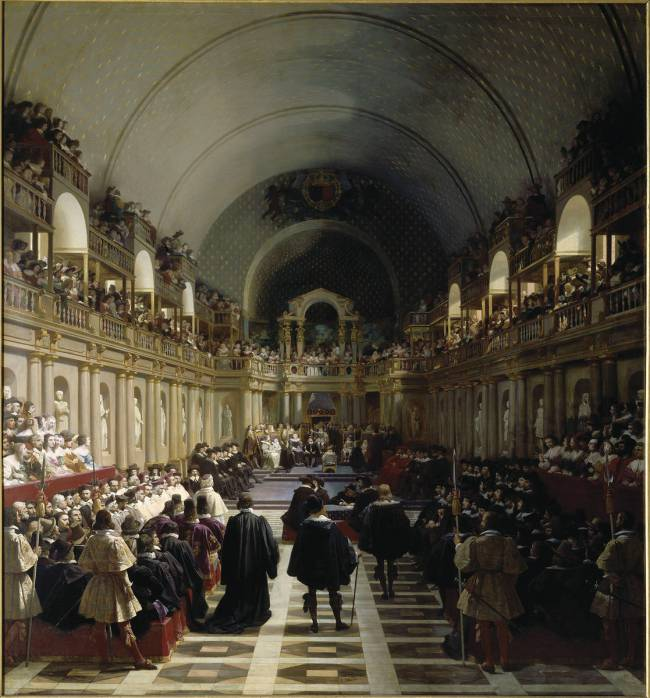
The Estates General Convened by Louis XIII, 1614 by Jean Alaux

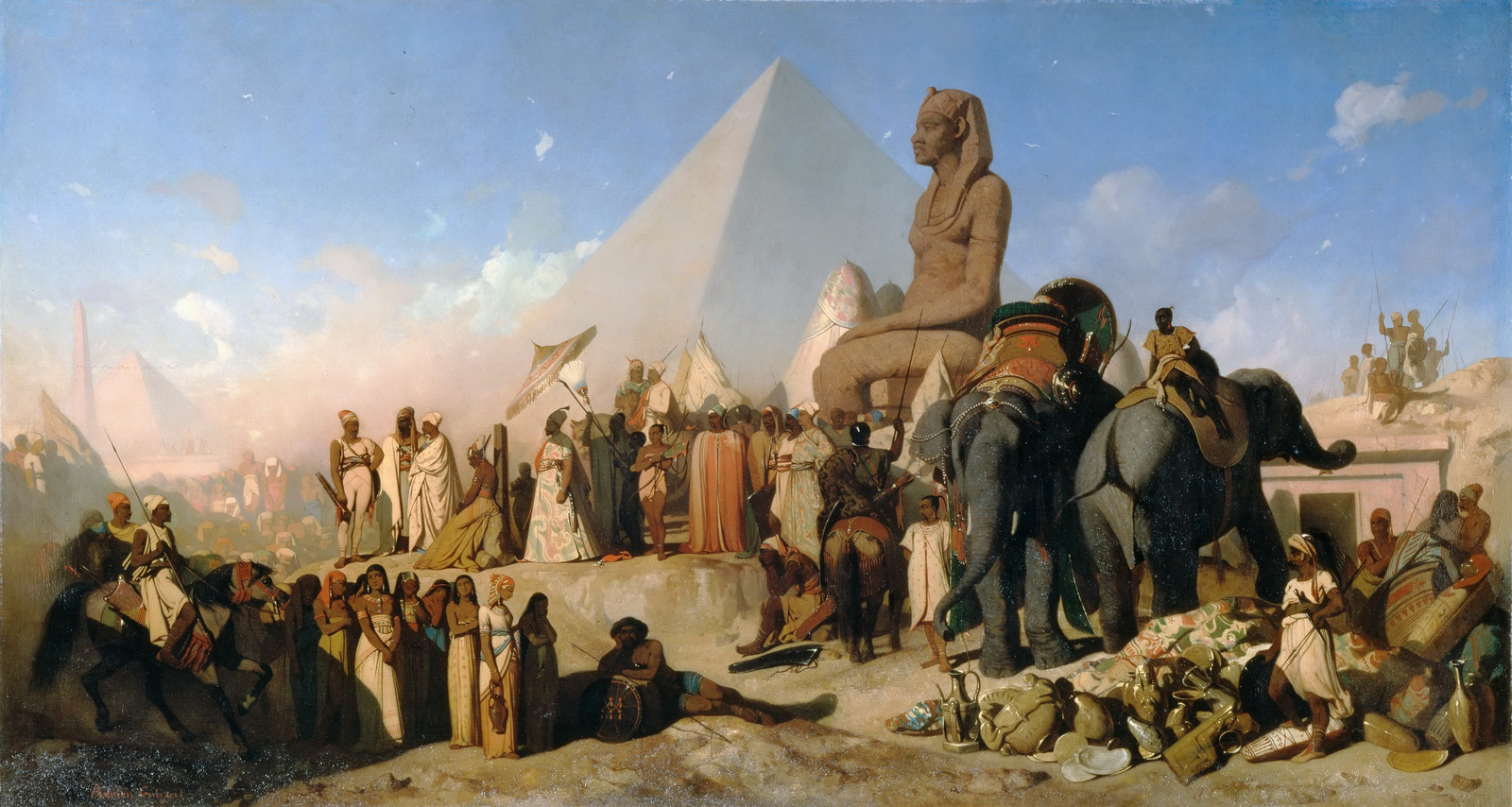
Cambyses and Psammetichus by Jean-Adrien Guignet

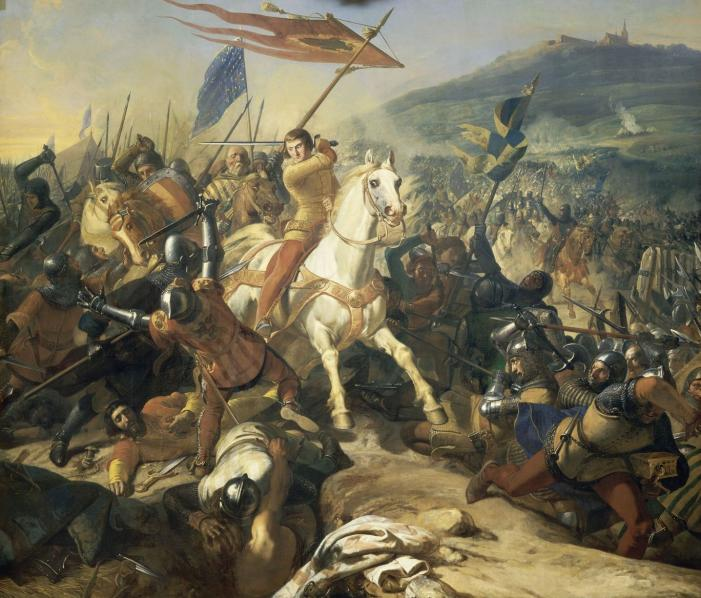
Battle of Mons-en-Pévèle by Charles-Philippe Larivière

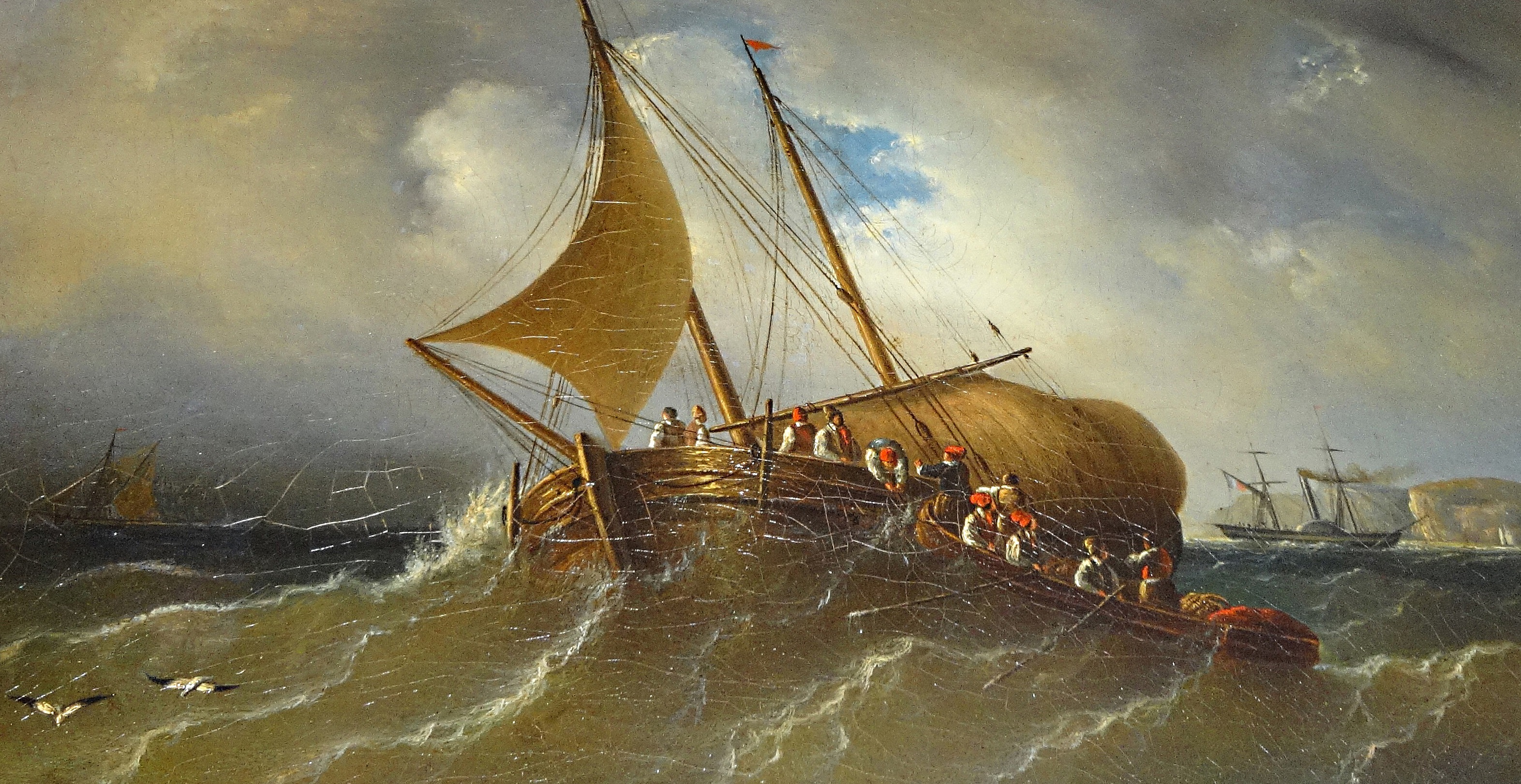
A Storm at Sea by Adrien Lainé

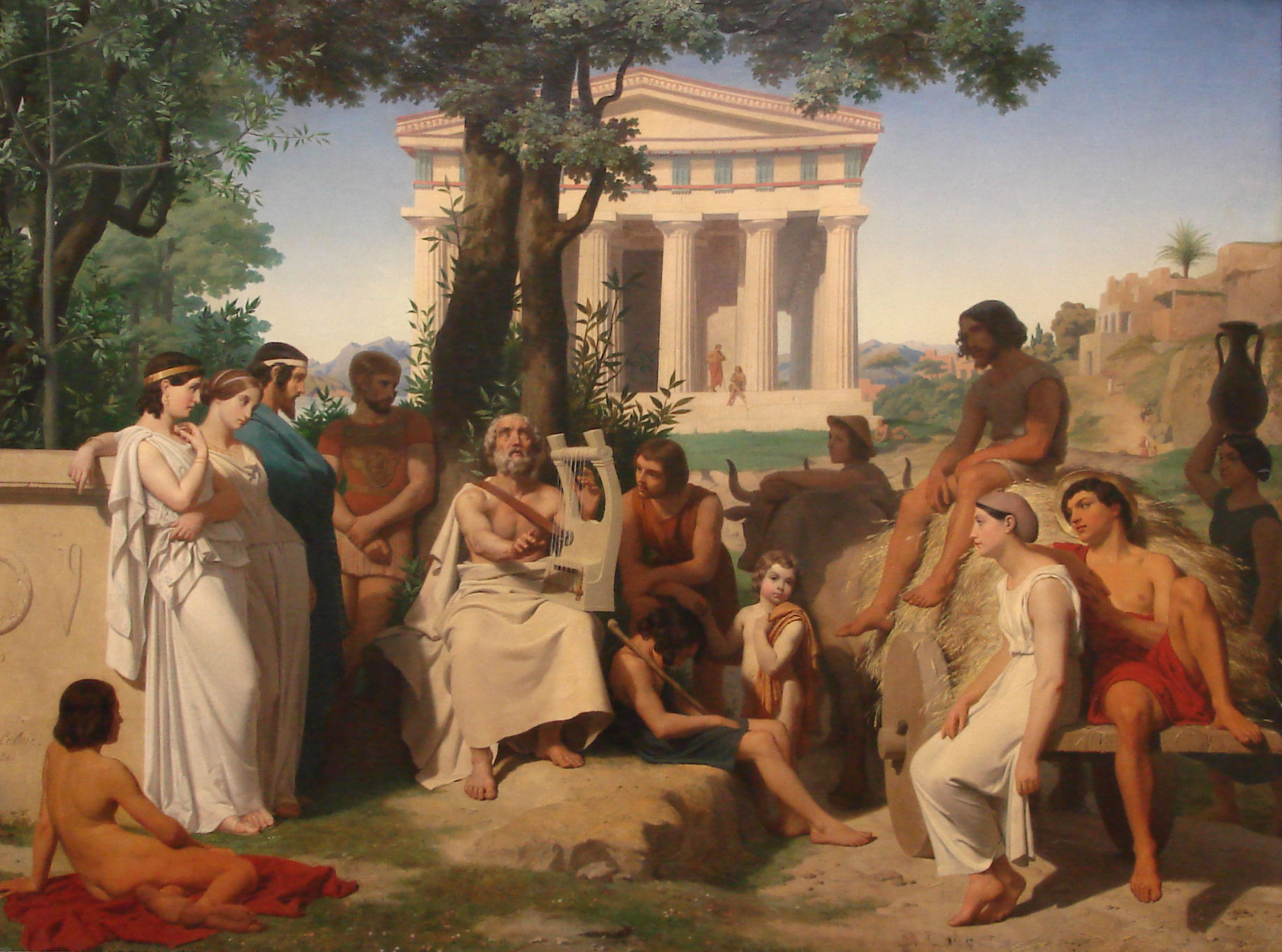
Homer by Auguste Leloir

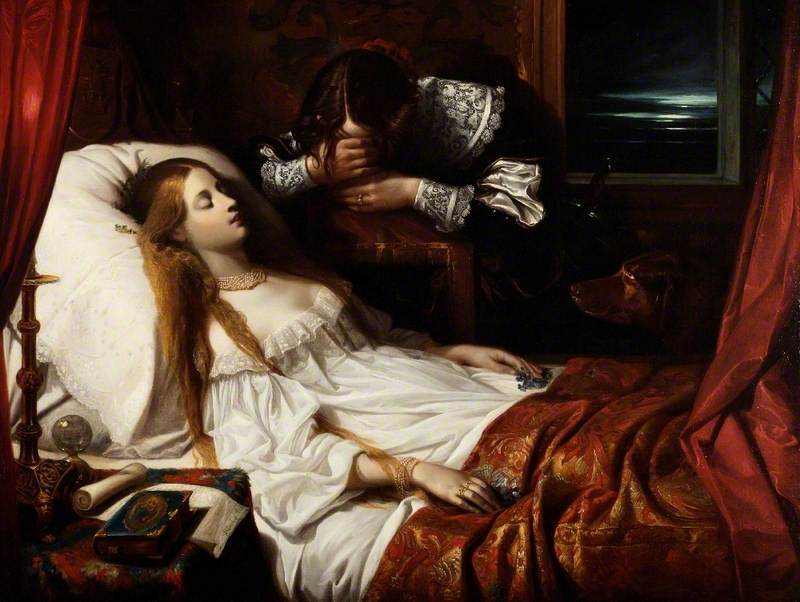
The Bride of Death by Thomas Jones Barker

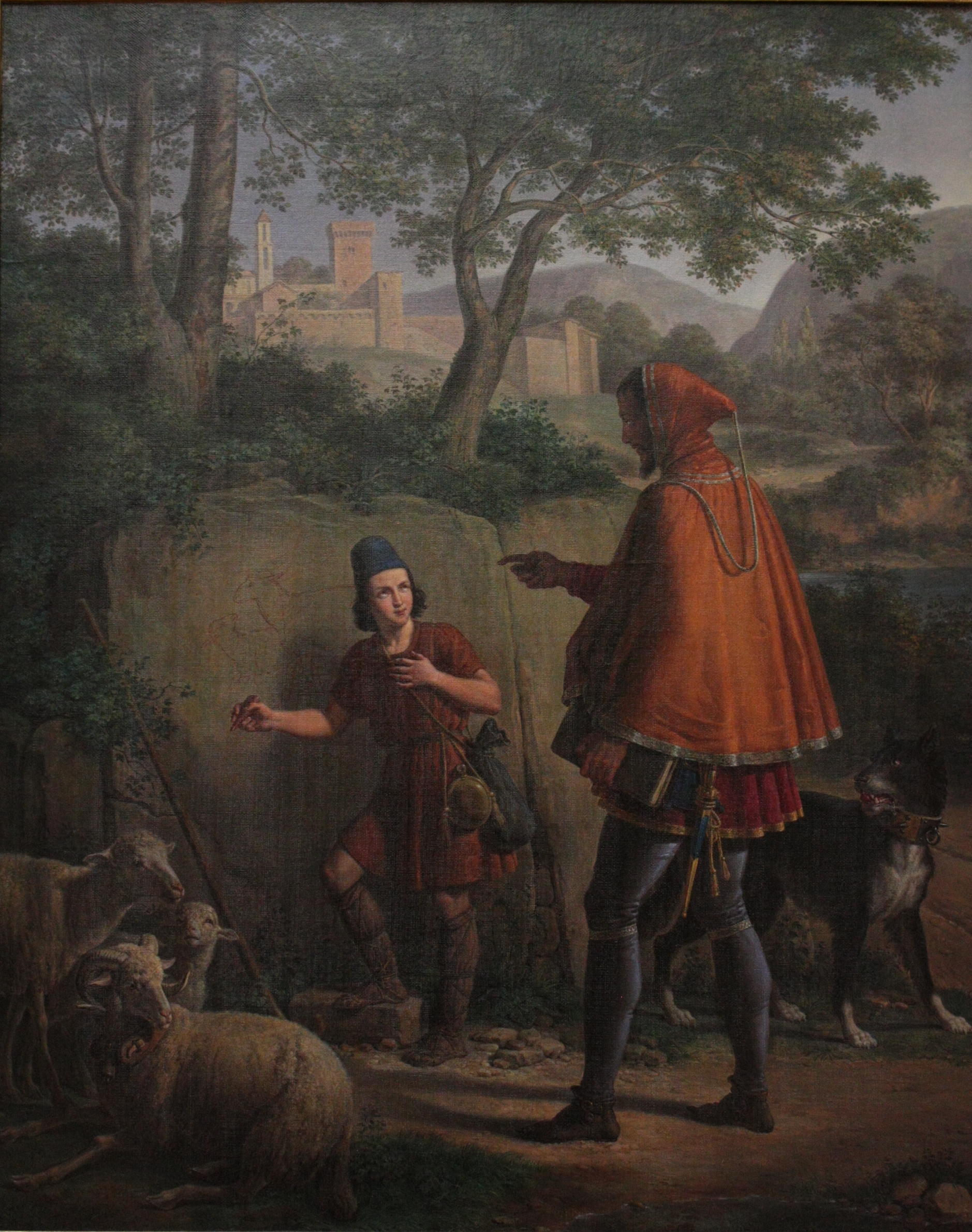
L'enfance de Giotto by Pierre Révoil

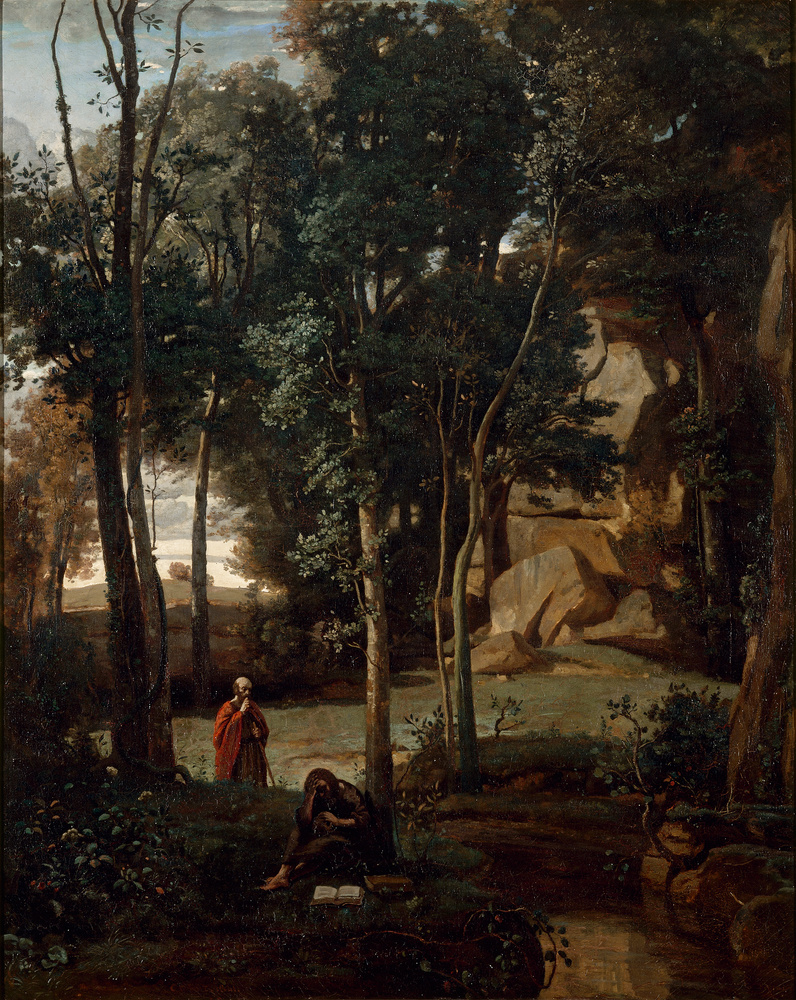
Democritus and the Abderitans by Jean-Baptiste-Camille Corot

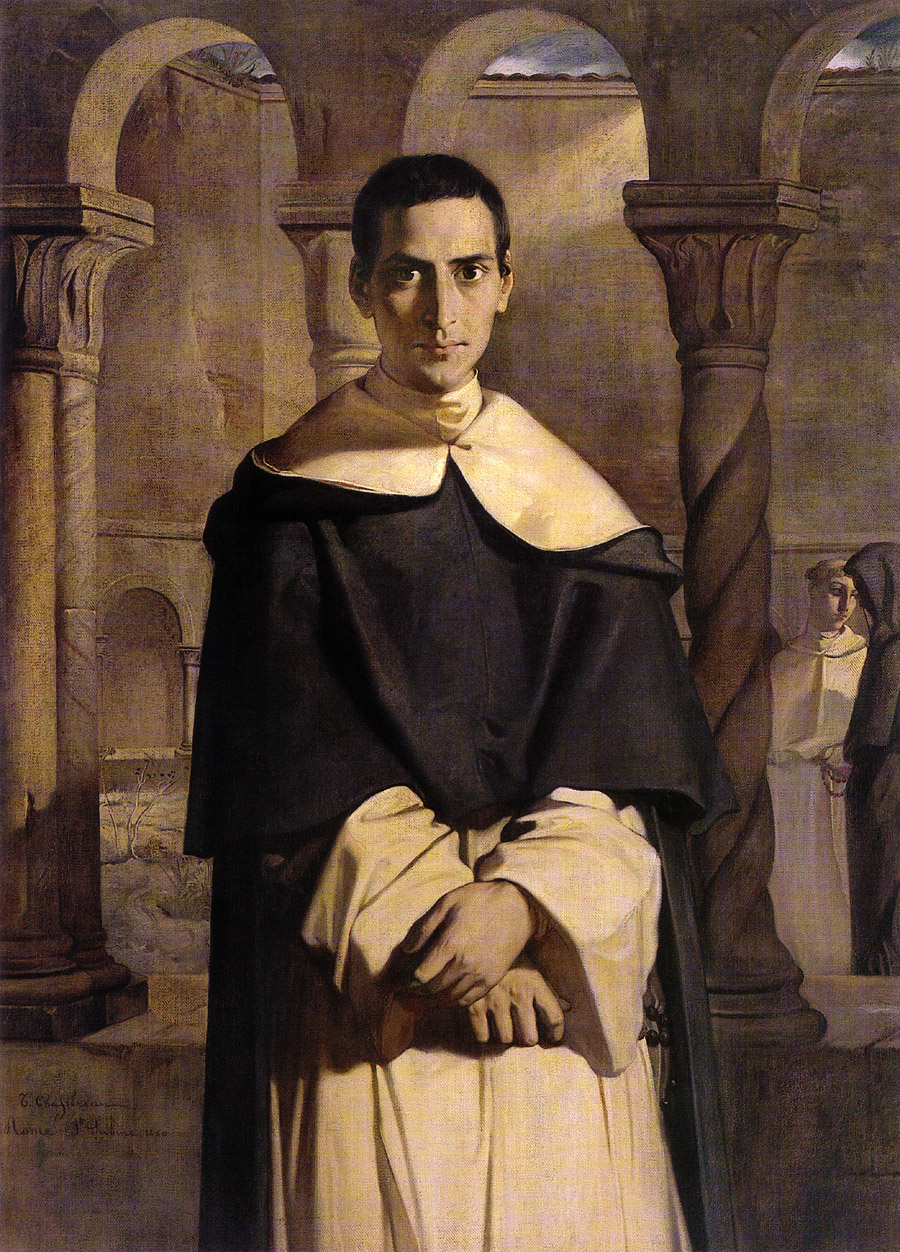
Portrait of Dominique Lacordaire by Théodore Chassériau

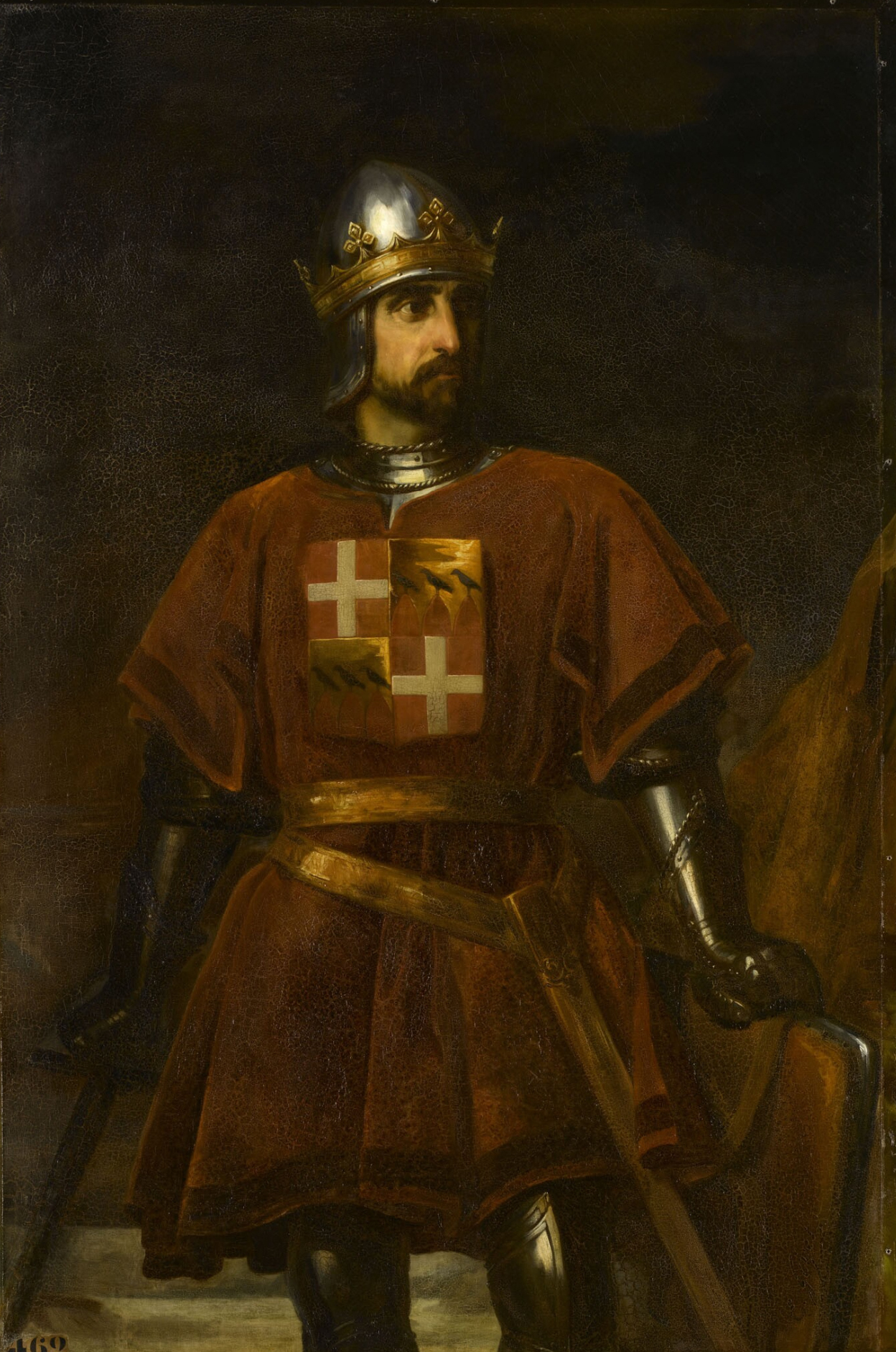
Foulques de Villaret by Eugène Goyet

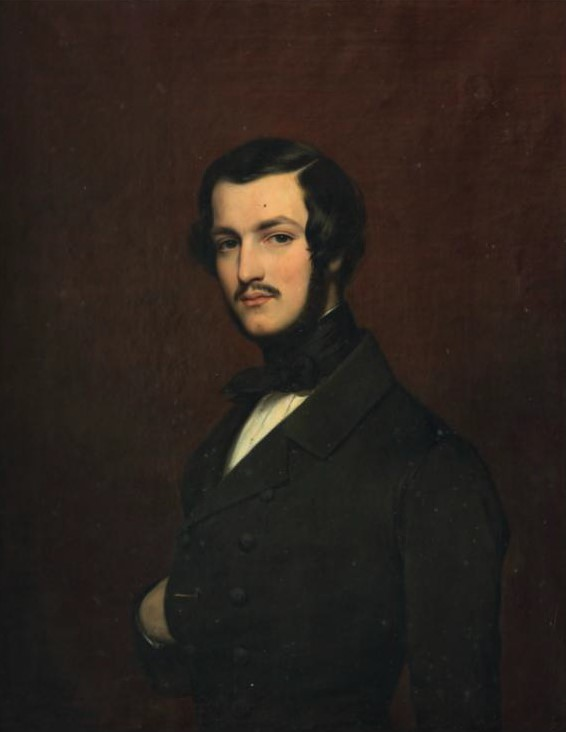
Portrait of Ernest Brugière de Barante by Joseph-Désiré Court

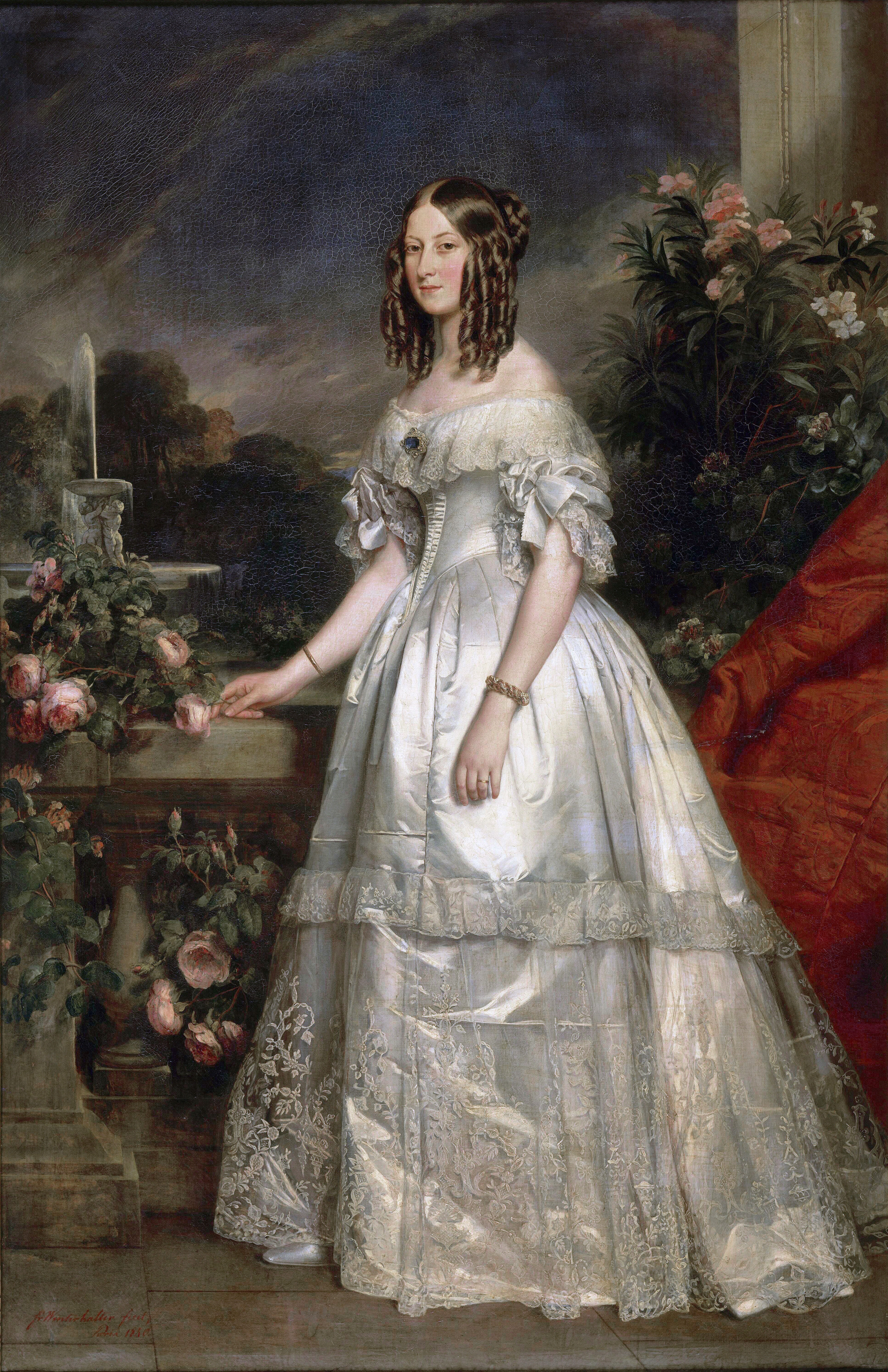
Portrait of the Duchess of Nemours by Franz Xaver Winterhalter

== Bibliography ==
- Allard, Sébastien & Fabre, Côme. Delacroix. Metropolitan Museum of Art, 2018.
- Norman, Geraldine. Nineteenth-century Painters and Painting: A Dictionary. University of California Press, 1977.
- Ives, Colta Feller & Barker, Elizabeth E. ''Romanticism & the School of Nature: Nineteenth-century Drawings and Paintings from the Karen B. Cohen Collection. Metropolitan Museum of Art, 2000.
- Pomerède, Vincent & Trébosc, Delphine. 1001 Paintings at the Louvre: From Antiquity to the Nineteenth Century. Musée du Louvre Editions, 2005.
- Thuillier, Jacques. History of Art. Flammarion, 2003.
