= Portrait of Dominique Lacordaire =

Painting by Théodore Chassériau

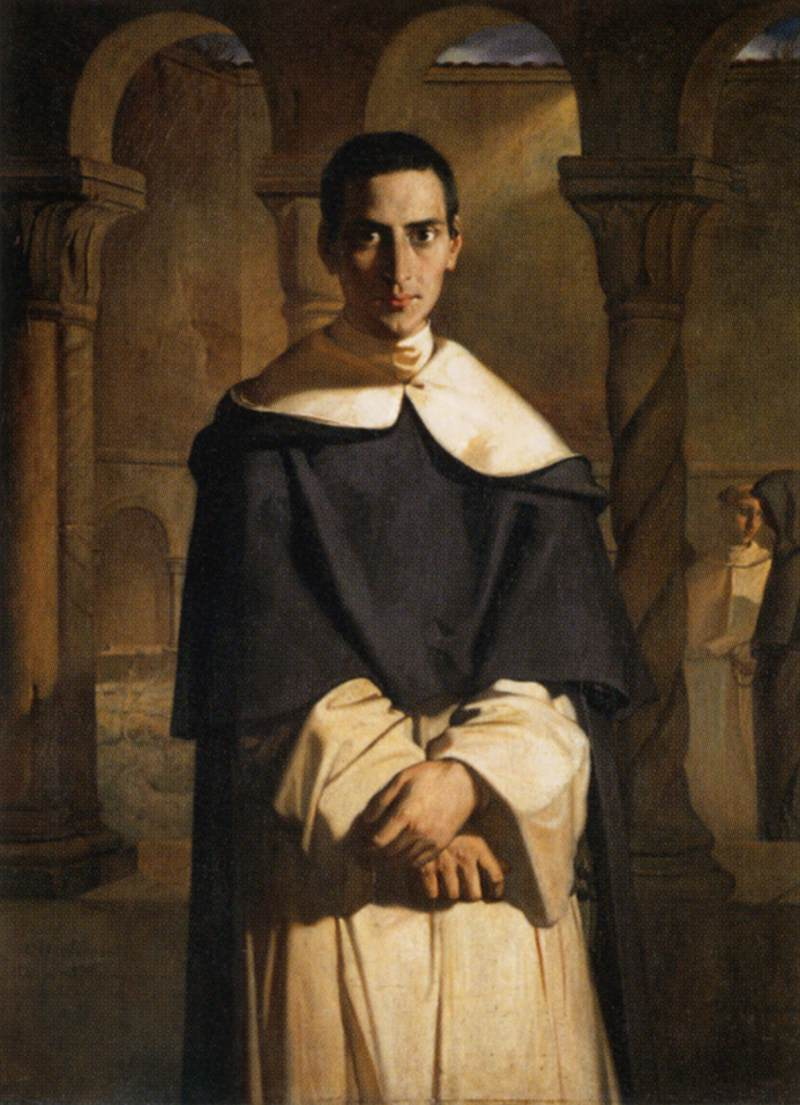
- Artist: Théodore Chassériau
- Year: 1840
- Type: Oil on canvas, portrait painting
- Dimensions: 146 cm × 107 cm (57 in × 42 in)
- Location: Louvre; Paris

Portrait of Dominique Lacordaire is an oil on canvas portrait painting by the French artist Théodore Chassériau, from 1840. It is held at the Louvre, in Paris.

It depicts the Catholic priest and theologian Jean-Baptiste Henri Lacordaire. He is depicted in the dress of the Dominican Order to which he belonged against the backdrop of the Santa Sabina in Rome.

Chassériau was a member of the Romantic movement in French art, strongly influenced by Eugène Delacroix. The portrait was displayed at the Salon of 1841 in Paris.Today the painting is in the city's Louvre, having been acquired in 1906.

== Bibliography ==
- Harrison, Carol E. Romantic Catholics: France's Postrevolutionary Generation in Search of a Modern Faith. Cornell University Press, 2014.
- Murray, Christopher John. Encyclopedia of the Romantic Era, 1760-1850, Volume 2. Taylor & Francis, 2004.
- Sandoz, Marc Théodore Chassériau, 1819-1856: Catalogue raisonné des peintures et estampes. 1974.
