= HMS Andromeda =

Eight ships of the Royal Navy have borne the name HMS Andromeda, after the Greek heroine Andromeda.

- HMS Andromeda (1777) was a 28-gun sixth rate launched in 1777 and lost in a hurricane in 1780.
- HMS Andromeda (1784) was a 32-gun fifth rate launched in 1784, placed on harbour service from 1808 and broken up in 1811.
- HMS Andromeda (1812) was a 24-gun sixth rate, previously the American Hannibal. She was captured in 1812 and sold in 1816.
- HMS Andromeda was to have been a sixth rate. She was renamed HMS Nimrod in 1827 before being launched in 1828.
- HMS Andromeda (1829) was a 46-gun fifth rate launched in 1829 and sold in 1863.
- HMS Andromeda (1897) was a Diadem-class cruiser launched in 1897. She later served as a depot and training ship, being renamed HMS Powerful II in 1913, HMS Impregnable II in 1919 and HMS Defiance in 1931. She was broken up in 1956.
- HMS Andromeda (1917) was an Anchusa-class sloop launched in 1917 for service with the French Navy under the name Andromede.
- HMS Andromeda (F57) was a Leander-class frigate launched in 1967. She was sold to the Indian Navy in 1995 and commissioned as Krishna.

== Battle Honours ==
Ships named Andromeda have earned the following battle honours:

- St. Vincent 1780
- Falkland Islands 1982
