= Andromeda Chained to the Rock by the Nereids =

Painting by Théodore Chassériau

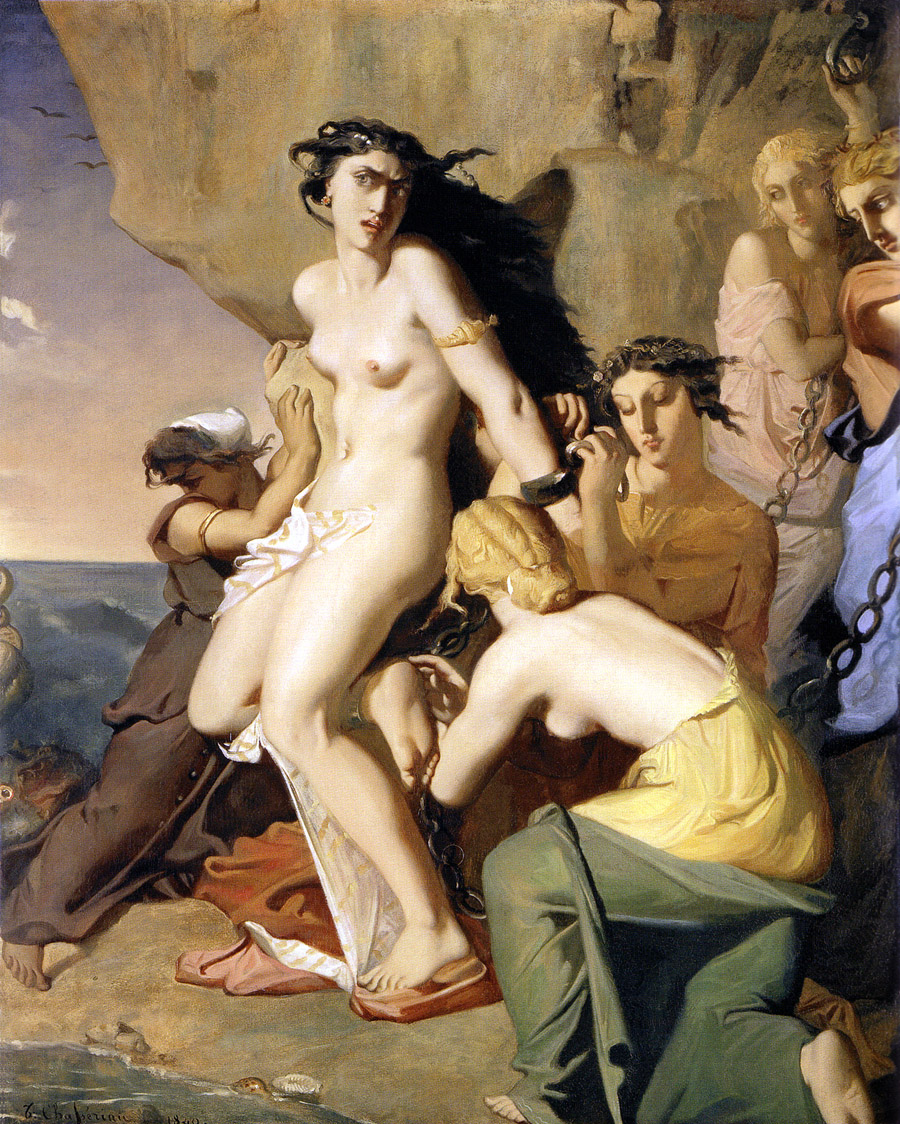
- Artist: Théodore Chassériau
- Year: 1840
- Type: Oil on canvas, history painting
- Dimensions: 92 cm × 74 cm (36 in × 29 in)
- Location: Louvre; Paris

Andromeda Chained to the Rock by the Nereids (French: Andromède attachée au rocher par les Néréides) is an oil on canvas history painting by the French artist Théodore Chassériau, from 1840.

Inspired by a story from Ancient Greek Mythology, it depicts Andromeda lashed to the rocks by the jealous Nereids. Chassériau chose to display this earlier scene rather than her being rescued by Perseus from the sea monster Cetus.

Chassériau was part of the Romantic movement and was influenced by Eugène Delacroix amongst others. The painting was exhibited at the Salon of 1841. This marked his final break from his former mentor Jean-Auguste-Dominique Ingres, whose style was rooted in more traditional neoclassicism. Today the work is in the collection of the Louvre in Paris.

== Bibliography ==
- Guégan, Stéphane. Théodore Chassériau, 1819-1856: The Unknown Romantic. Metropolitan Museum of Art, 2002.
- Sandoz, Marc Théodore Chassériau, 1819-1856: Catalogue raisonné des peintures et estampes. 1974.
