= François Vincent Latil =

French painter (1796–1890)

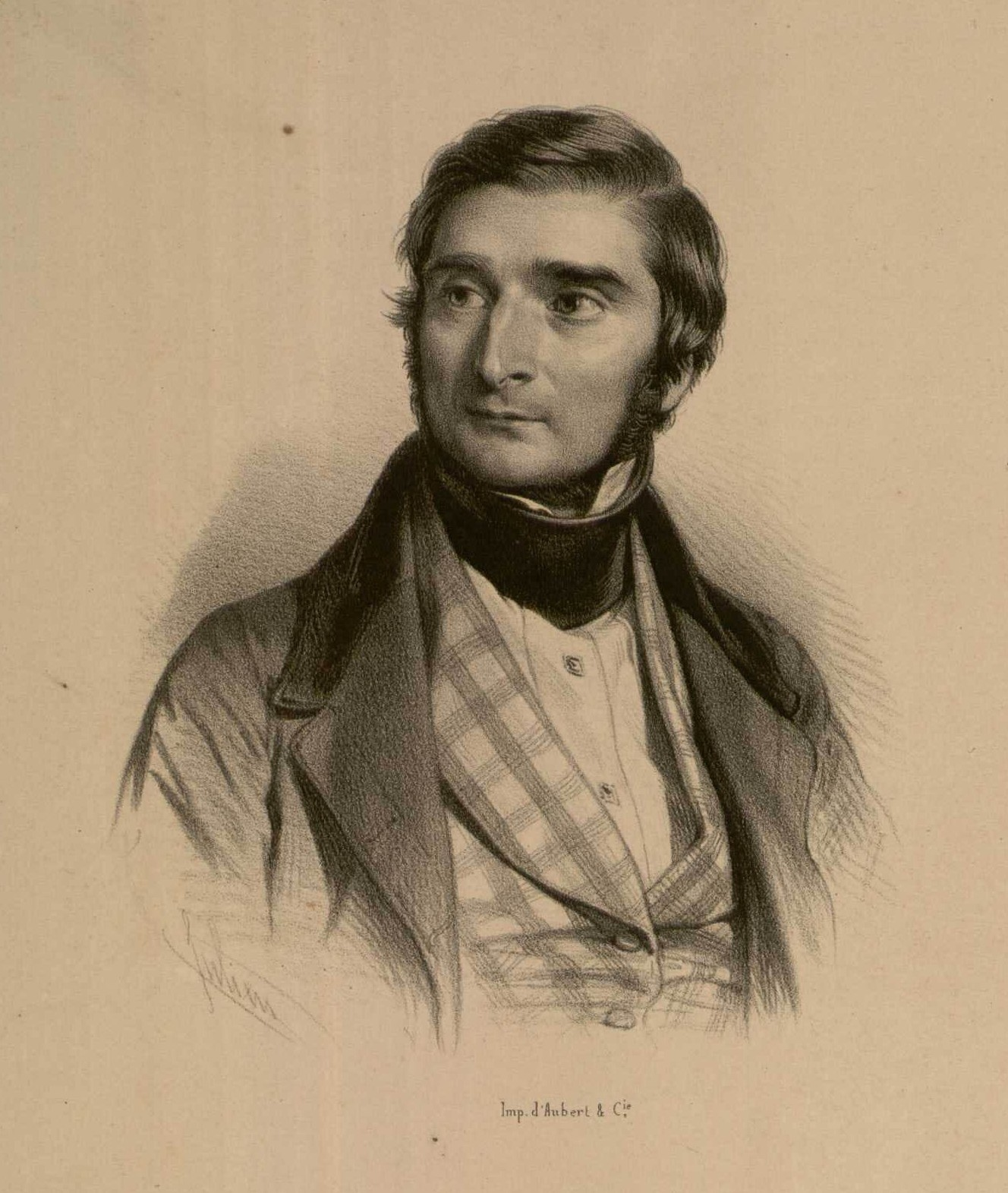
Portrait of François Vincent Mathieu Latil, lithograph, circa 1835

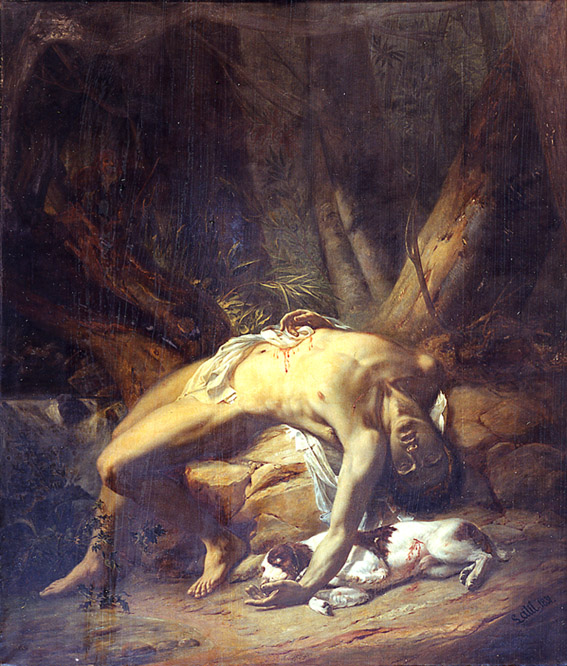
The Young Traveller (1831)

François Vincent Mathieu Latil (born 2 February 1796 in Aix-en-Provence - deceased on 4 March 1890 in Saint-Girons), was a French painter.

== Biography ==
In 1818 he joined the École des Beaux-Arts. He then went on to study in Paris, with teachers such as Antoine-Jean Gros and Paulin Guérin.

He received a second-class medal from the Salon in 1827 (for Jésus guérit un possédé), and a first-class medal in 1841 (for Episode de l'Histoire des naufrages).

He is perhaps best known for his historical and religious portraits.
