= Andromeda (Rodin) =

Sculpture by Auguste Rodin

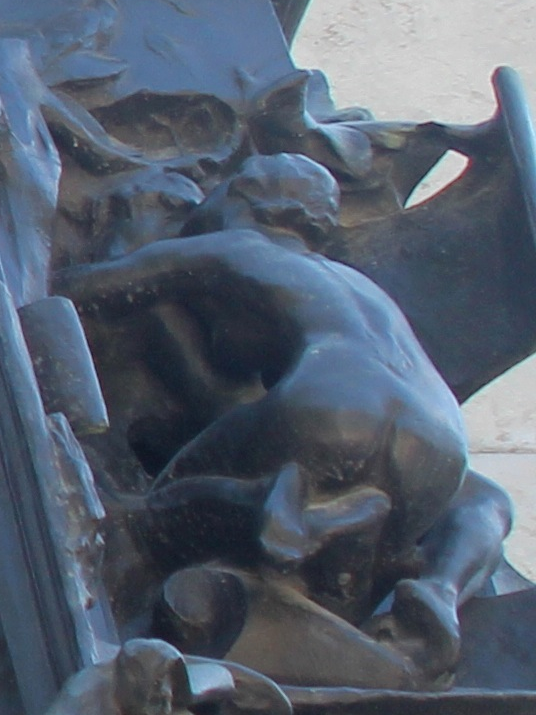
- Artist: Auguste Rodin
- Year: 1889
- Medium: plaster

Andromeda is a sculpture by the French artist Auguste Rodin, named after Andromeda. It is one of the sculptures produced as part of his The Gates of Hell project and appears on the left door next to the personification of Day and on the right door as part of the group showing a falling winged genius.

== Exhibitions ==
It was exhibited for the first time in 1889 at the Galerie Georges Petit in a joint exhibition with Claude Monet.

== Praise ==
The poet Rainer Maria Rilke praised the work's expressive quality, which he held to be more disperse, grandiose and mysterious than simply showing the figure's facial expression.

== See also ==
- List of sculptures by Auguste Rodin
- Auguste Rodin
- Andromeda (mythology)
- Rainer Maria Rilke
- Claude Monet
- Sculpture
