= HMS Andromache =

Four ships of the Royal Navy have borne the name HMS Andromache, after the figure of Andromache in Greek mythology. A fifth was planned but never completed.

- HMS Andromache (1781) was a 32-gun fifth rate launched in 1781 and broken up in 1811. Served as a communication vessel in the Battle of the Saintes in 1782.
- HMS Andromache (1812) was a 38-gun fifth rate, formerly the French frigate Junon. She was captured in 1799 and named HMS Princess Charlotte, renamed HMS Andromache in 1812, and broken up in 1828.
- HMS Andromache (1832) was a 28-gun sixth rate launched in 1832. She was converted to a powder hulk in 1854 and was broken up in 1875.
- HMS Andromache (1890) was an Apollo-class protected cruiser launched in 1890. She was converted to a minelayer in 1909 and was scrapped in 1920.
- HMS Andromache (P424) was to have been an Amphion-class submarine. She was cancelled in 1945.
