= Royal Academy Exhibition of 1840 =

1840 art exhibition in London

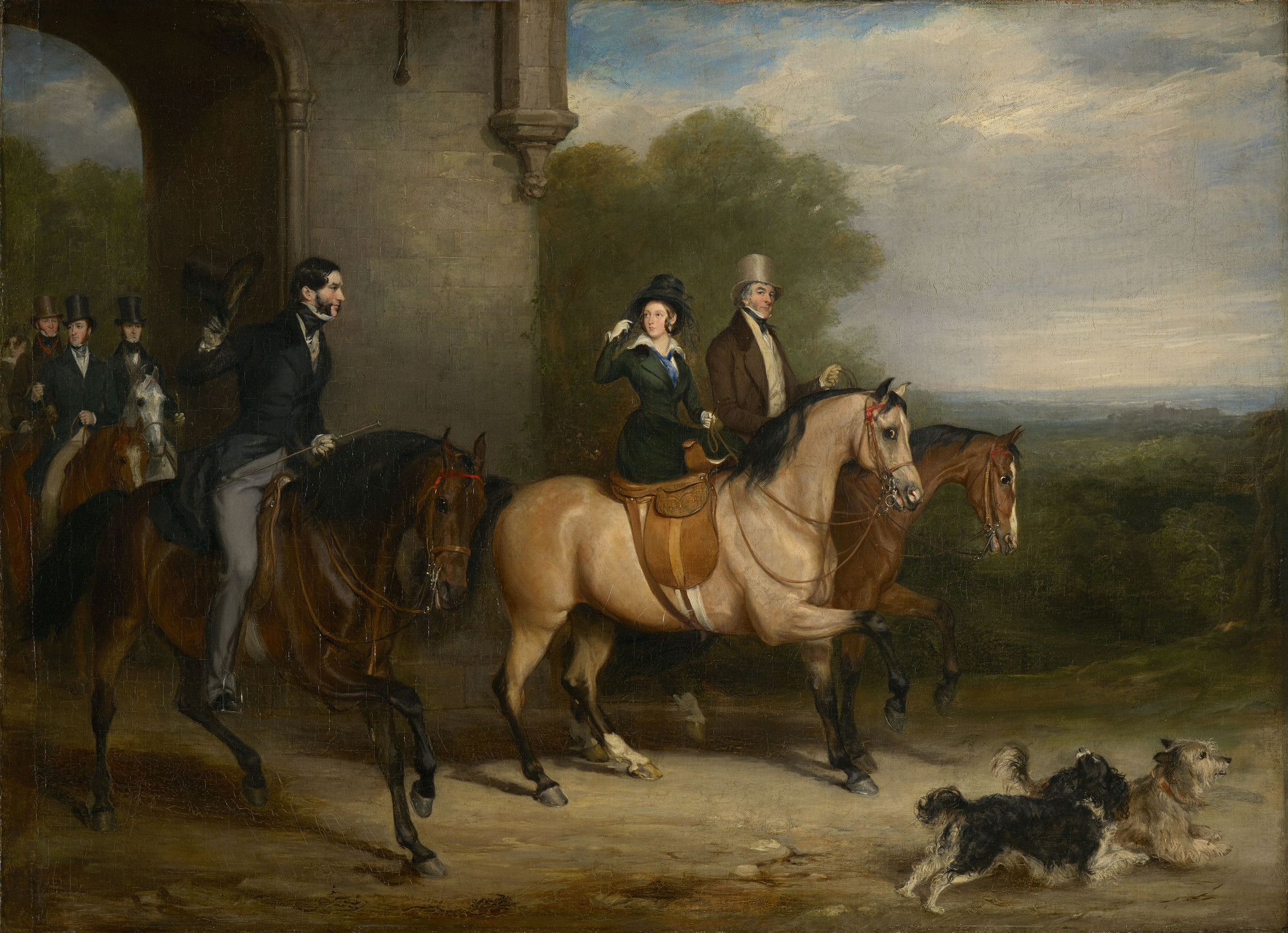
Queen Victoria Riding Out by Francis Grant

The Royal Academy Exhibition of 1840 was the seventy second annual Summer Exhibition of the British Royal Academy of Arts. It was held at the National Gallery in London from 4 May to 24 July 1840 and featured submissions from leading painters, sculptors and architects of the early Victorian era.

J.M.W. Turner submitted a series of paintings including landscape scenes of Venice and Naples. One of his more unusual works was The Slave Ship which showed the crew of a slaver throwing their enslaved prisoners overboard in a scene likely inspired by the eighteenth century Zong massacre. Edwin Landseer, a specialist in animal paintings, featured a number of works including Laying Down the Law. One of his best-known paintings it shows a group of dogs who resemble the proceedings of an English court of law.

Francis Grant, an emerging Scottish portrait painter, displayed Queen Victoria Riding Out featuring Queen Victoria and her Prime Minister Lord Melbourne at Windsor. David Wilkie submitted his own Portrait of Queen Victoria to a hostile critical reception.

== Gallery ==
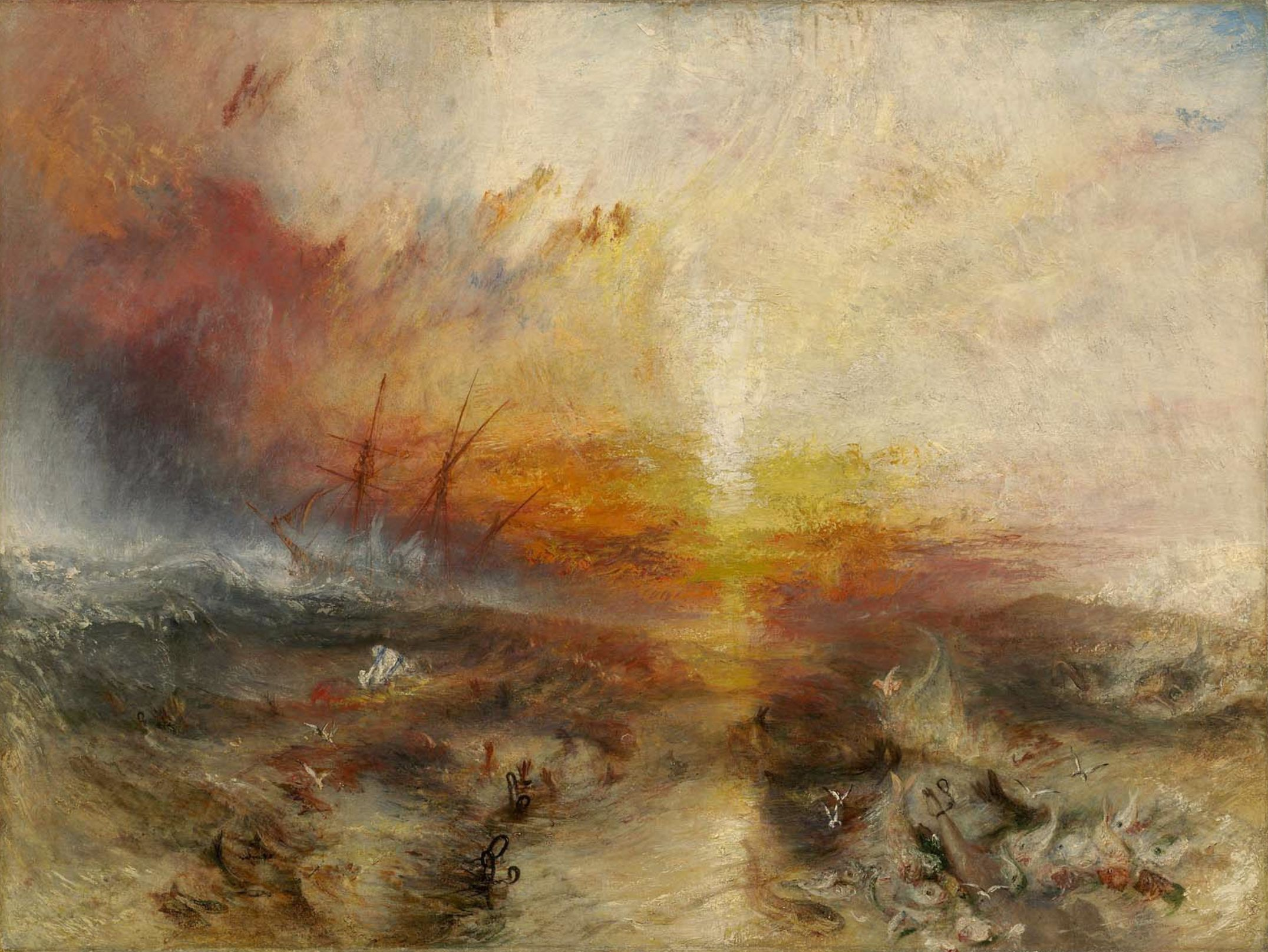
The Slave Ship by J.M.W. Turner

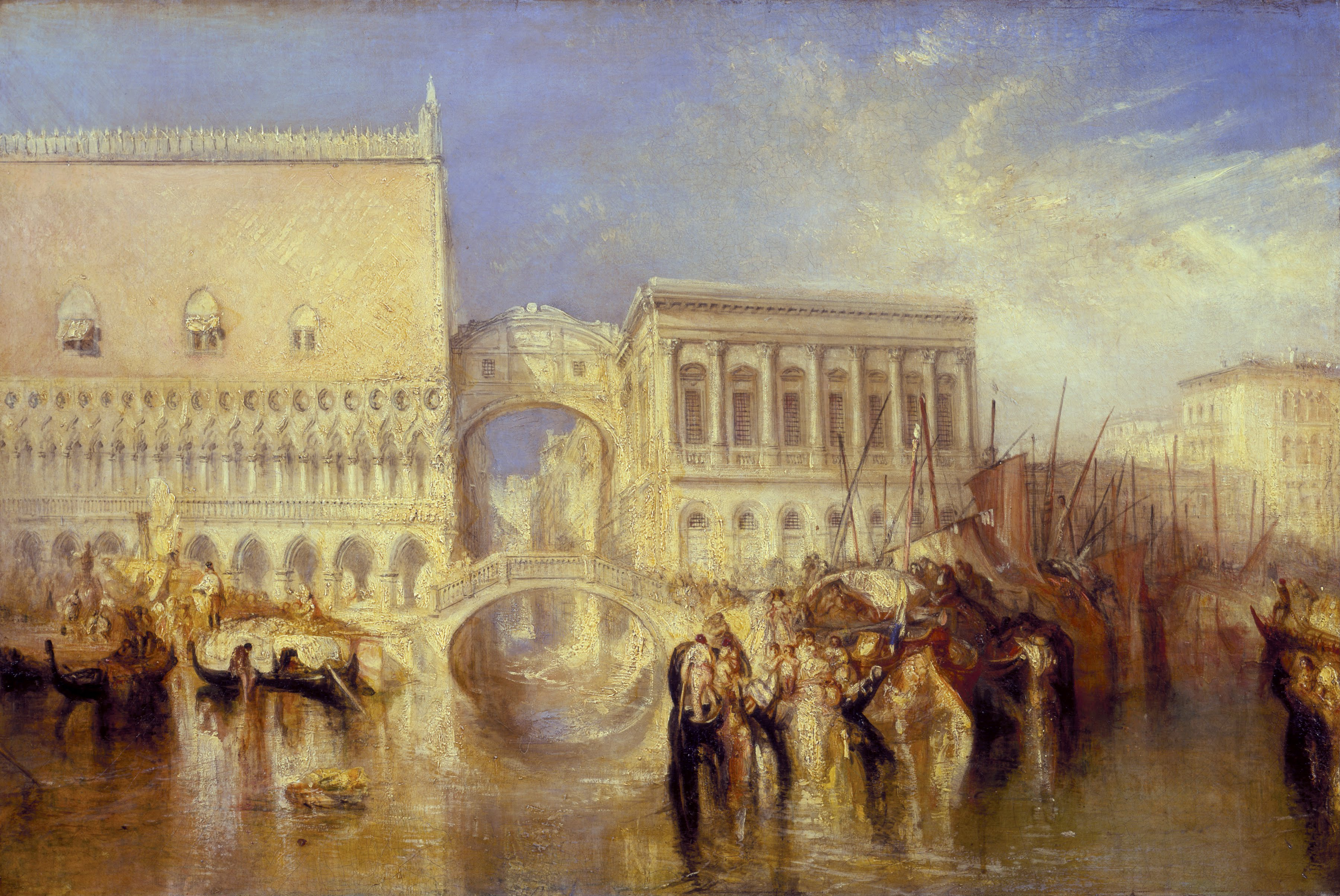
Venice, the Bridge of Sighs by J.M.W. Turner

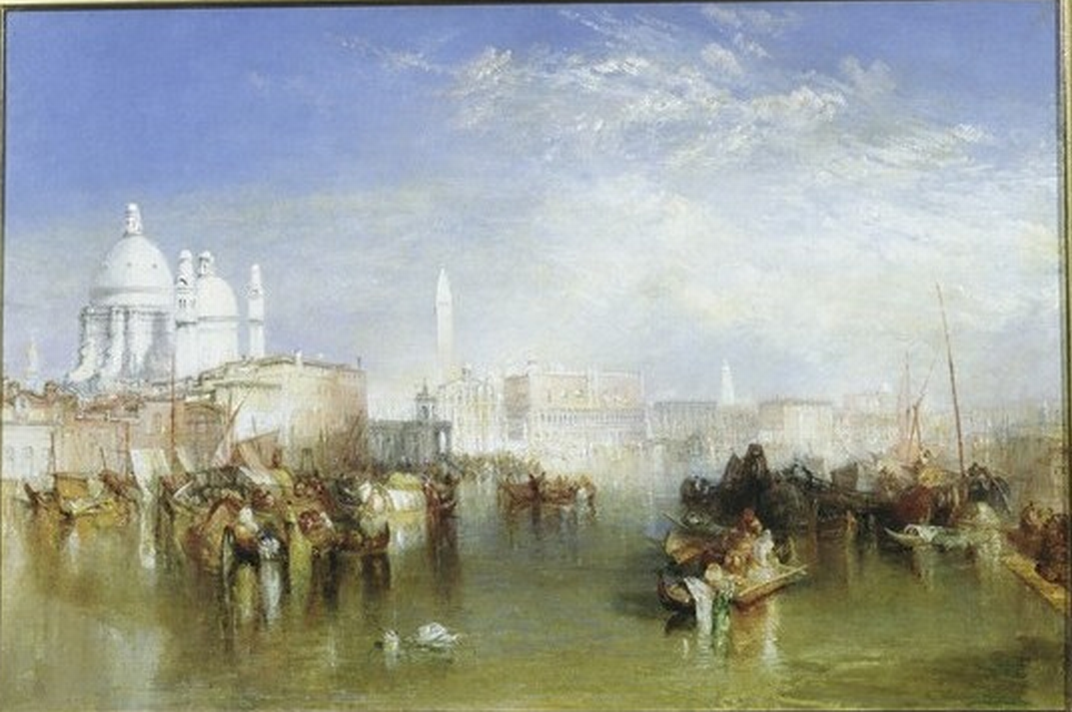
Venice from the Giudecca by J.M.W. Turner

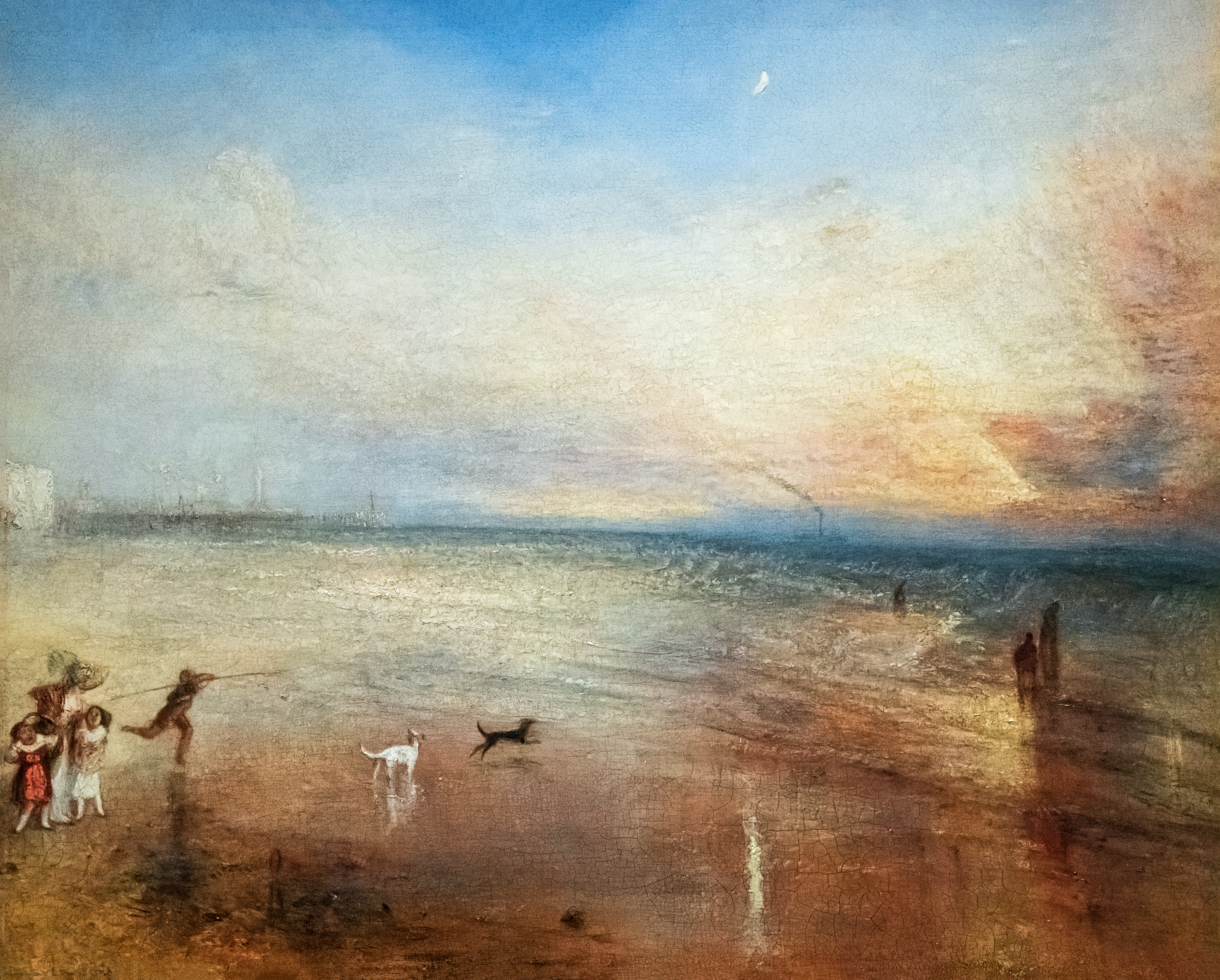
The New Moon by J.M.W. Turner

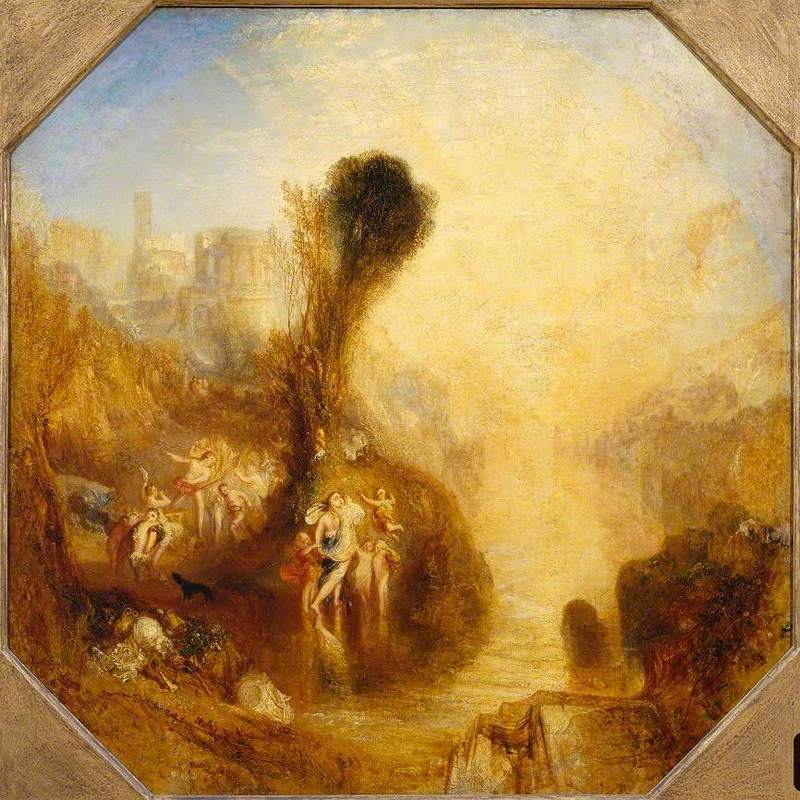
Bacchus and Ariadne by J.M.W. Turner

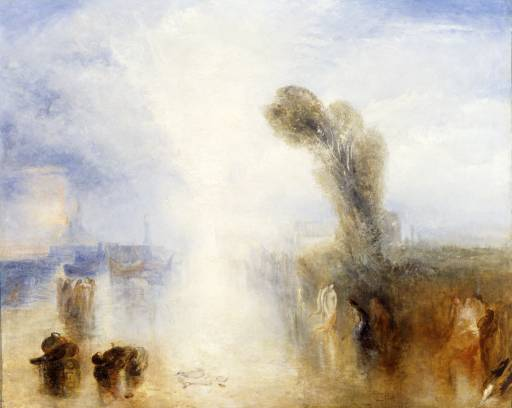
Neapolitan Fisher Girls Surprised Bathing by Moonlight by J.M.W. Turner

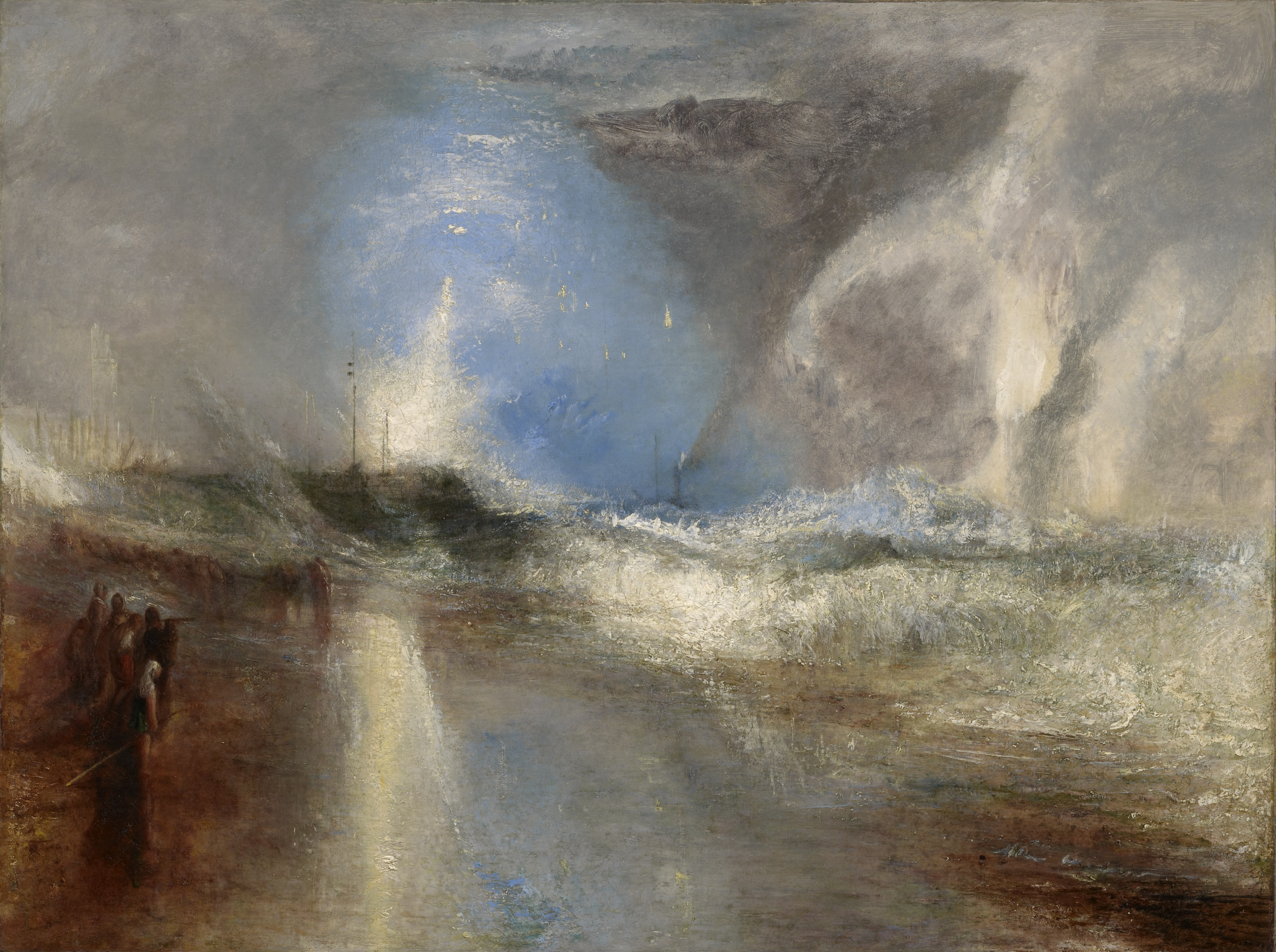
Rockets and Blue Lights by J.M.W. Turner

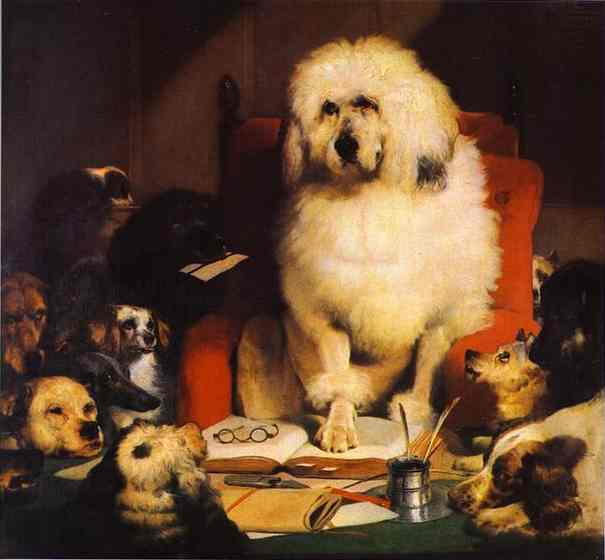
Laying Down the Law by Edwin Landseer

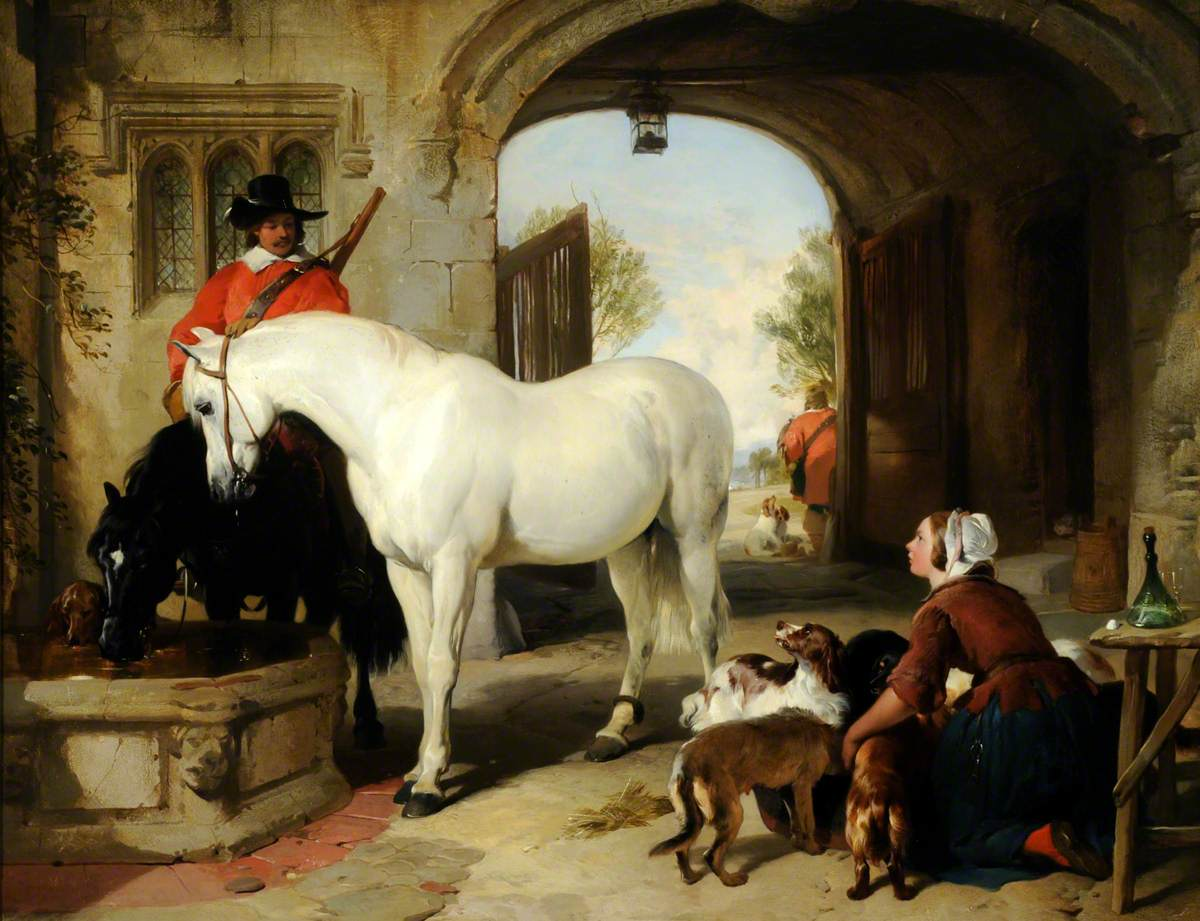
Horses Taken in to Bait by Edwin Landseer

The Lion Dog of Malta by Edwin Landseer

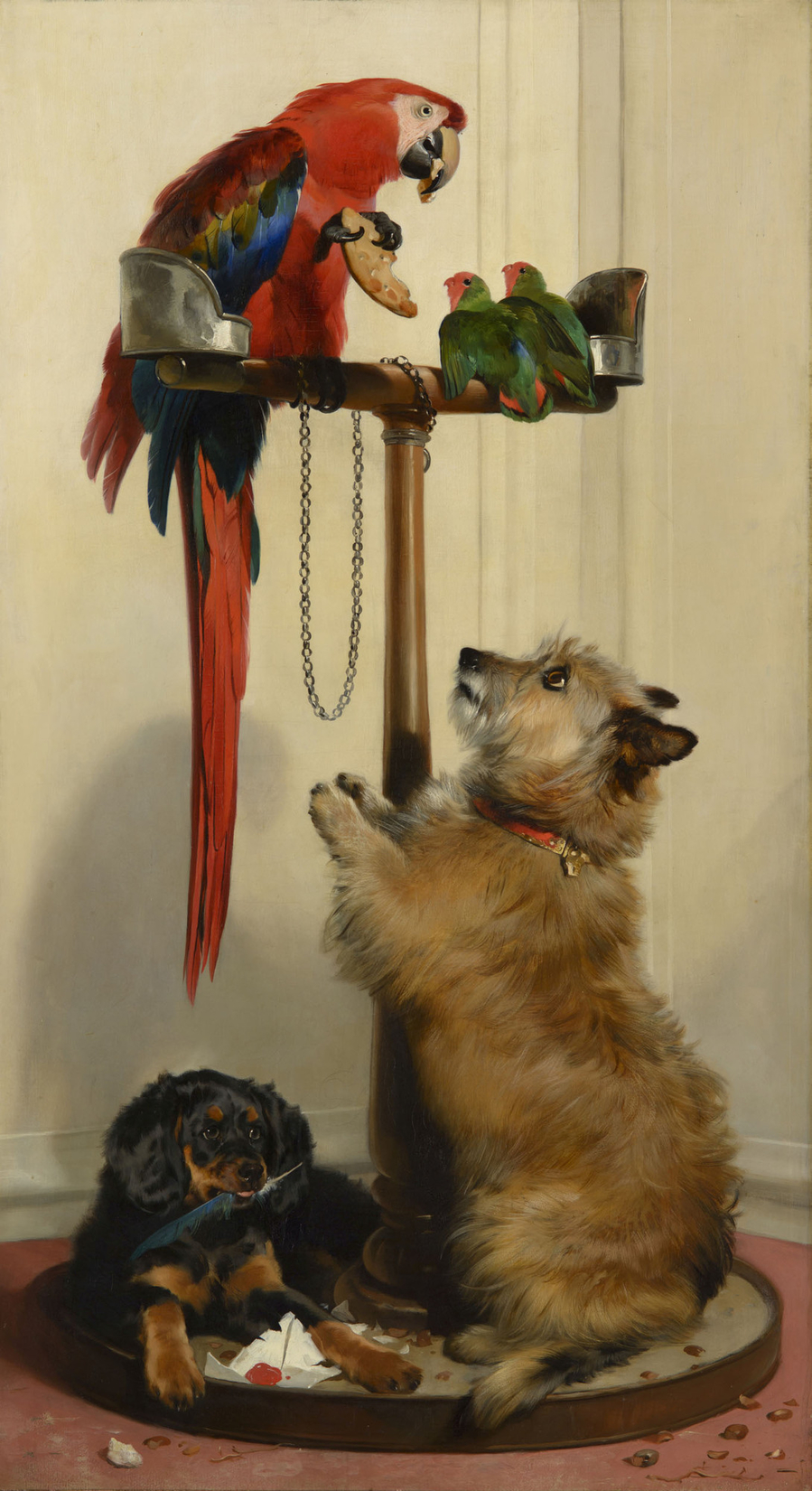
Islay, Tilco, a Macaw and Two Lovebirds by Edwin Landseer

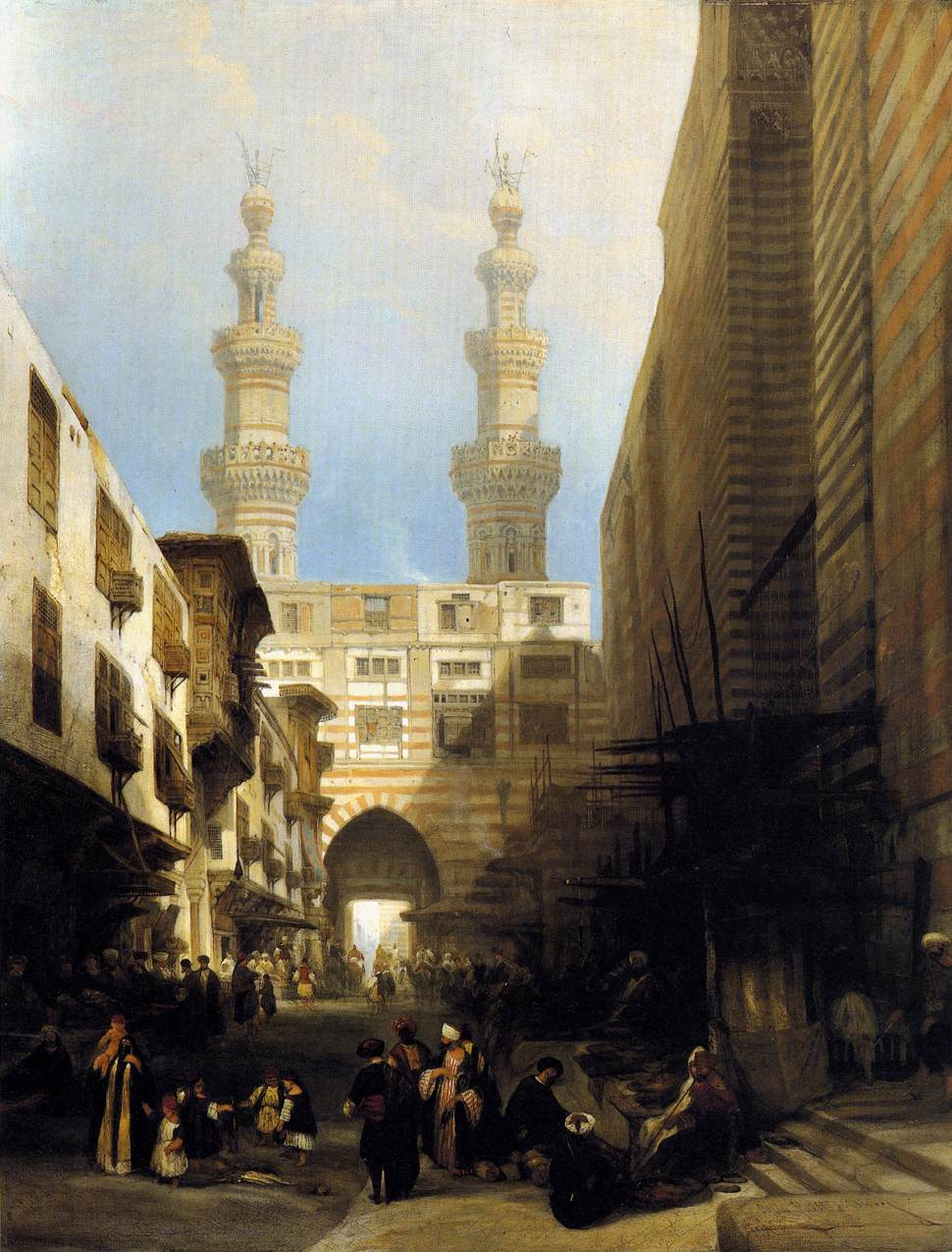
A View in Cairo by David Roberts

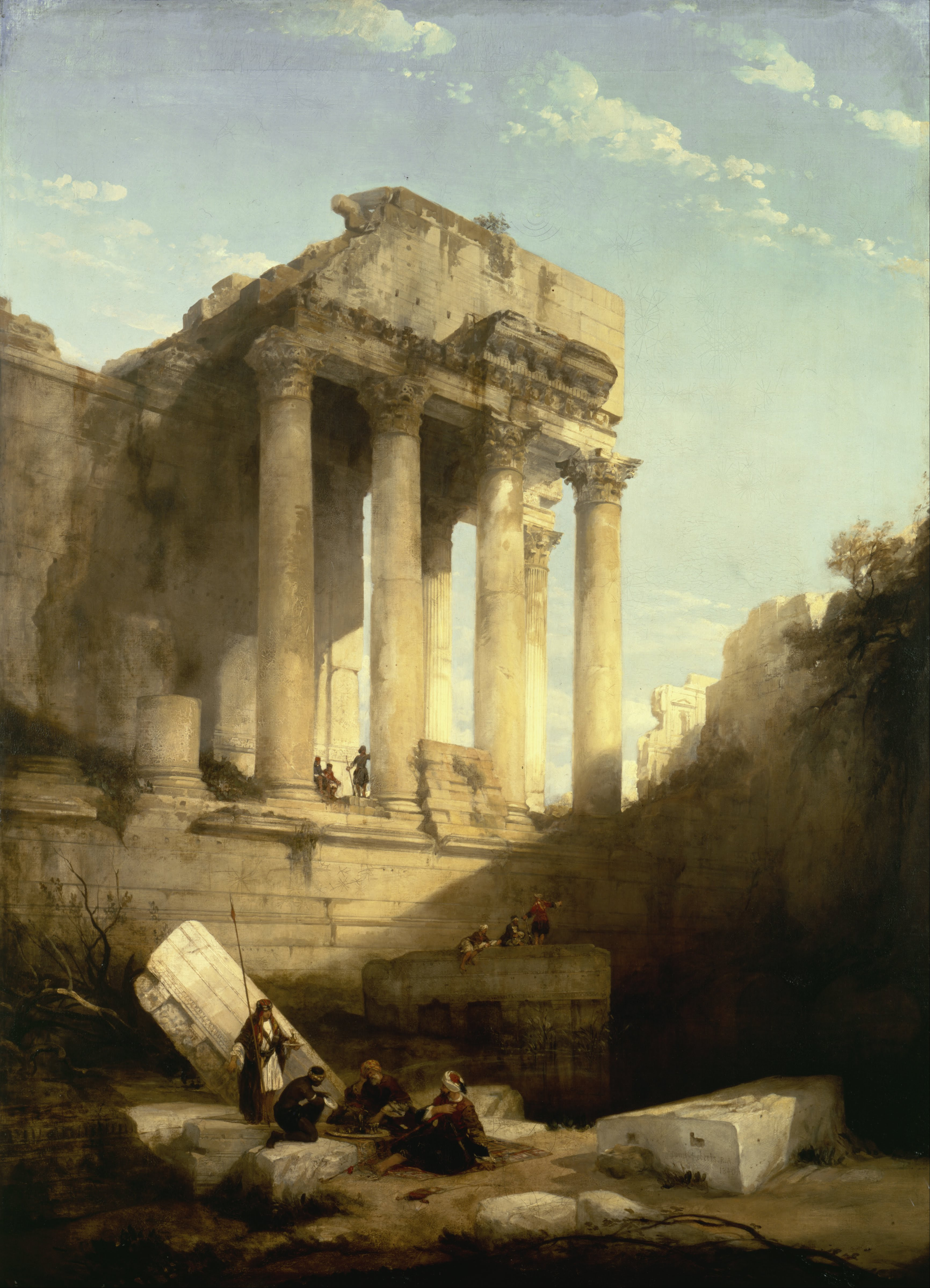
Portico of the Great Temple at Baalbec

The First Meeting of Petrarch and Laura by Henry Nelson O'Neil

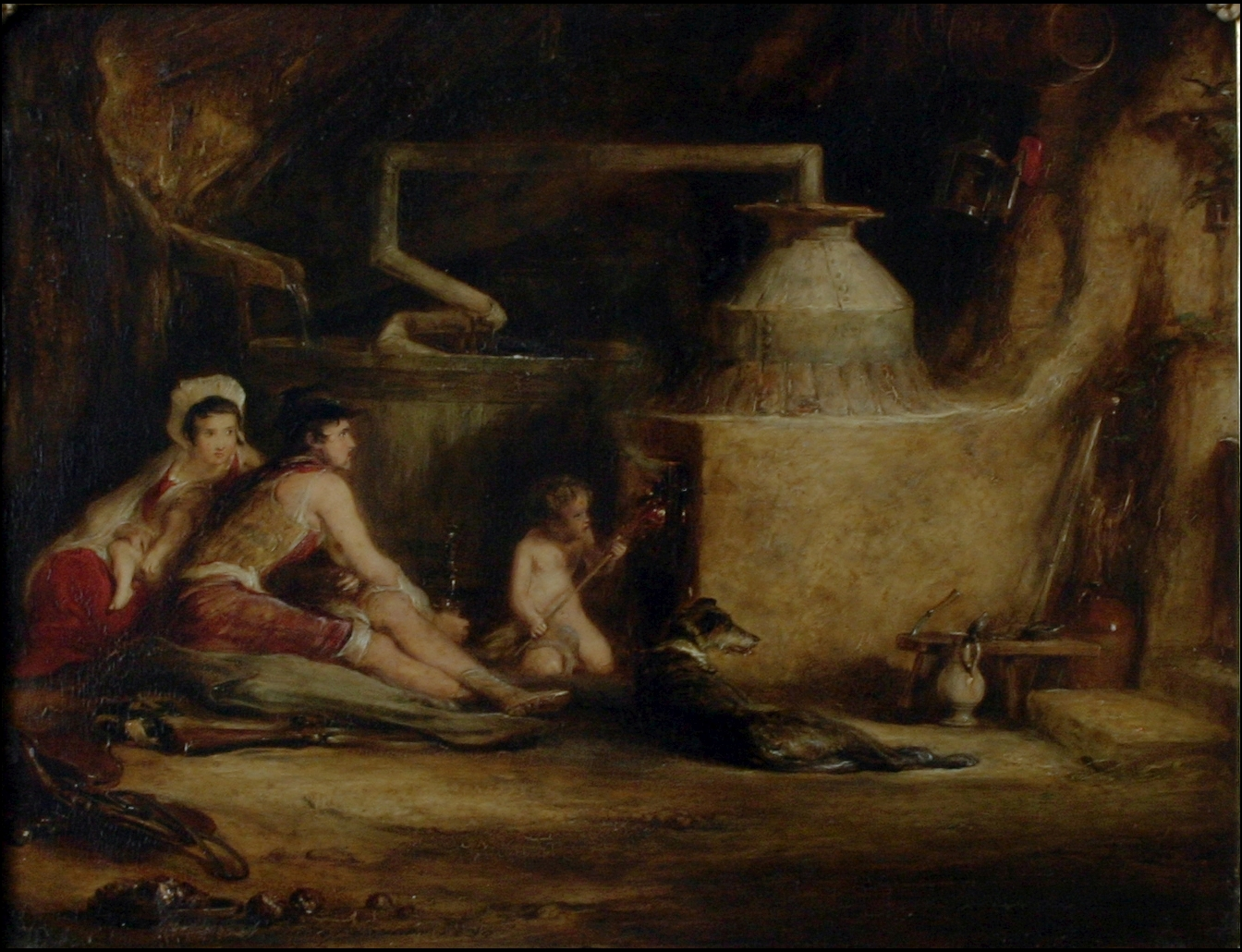
The Irish Whiskey Still by David Wilkie

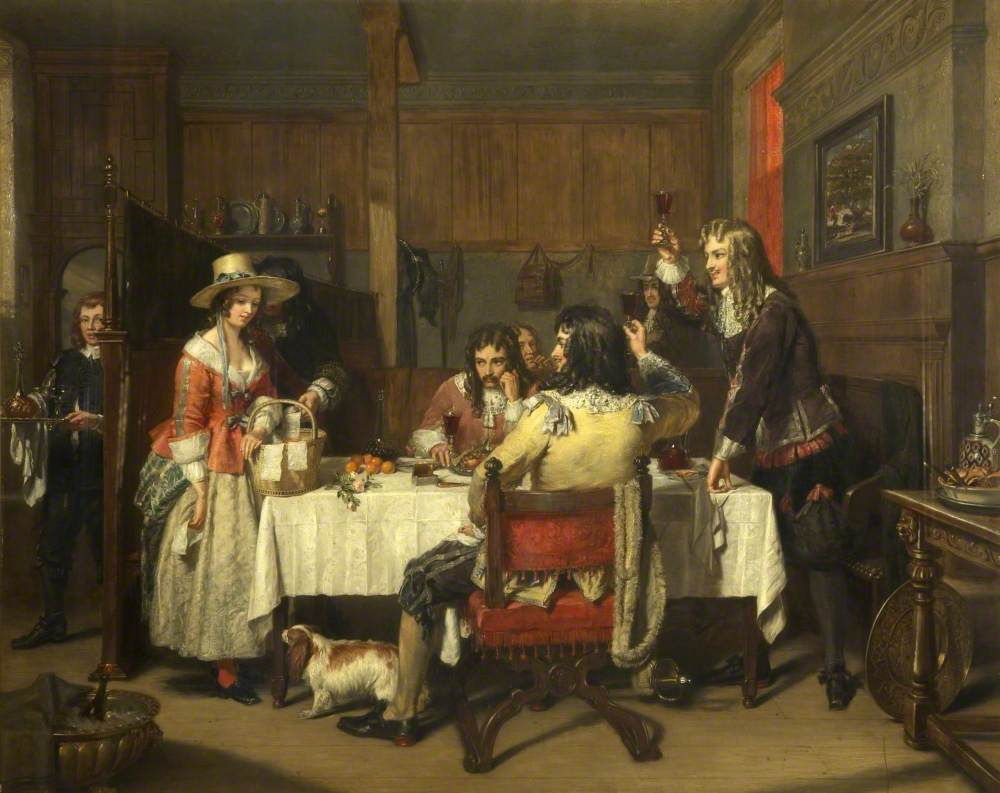
Nell Gwynn at the Tavern by Charles Landseer

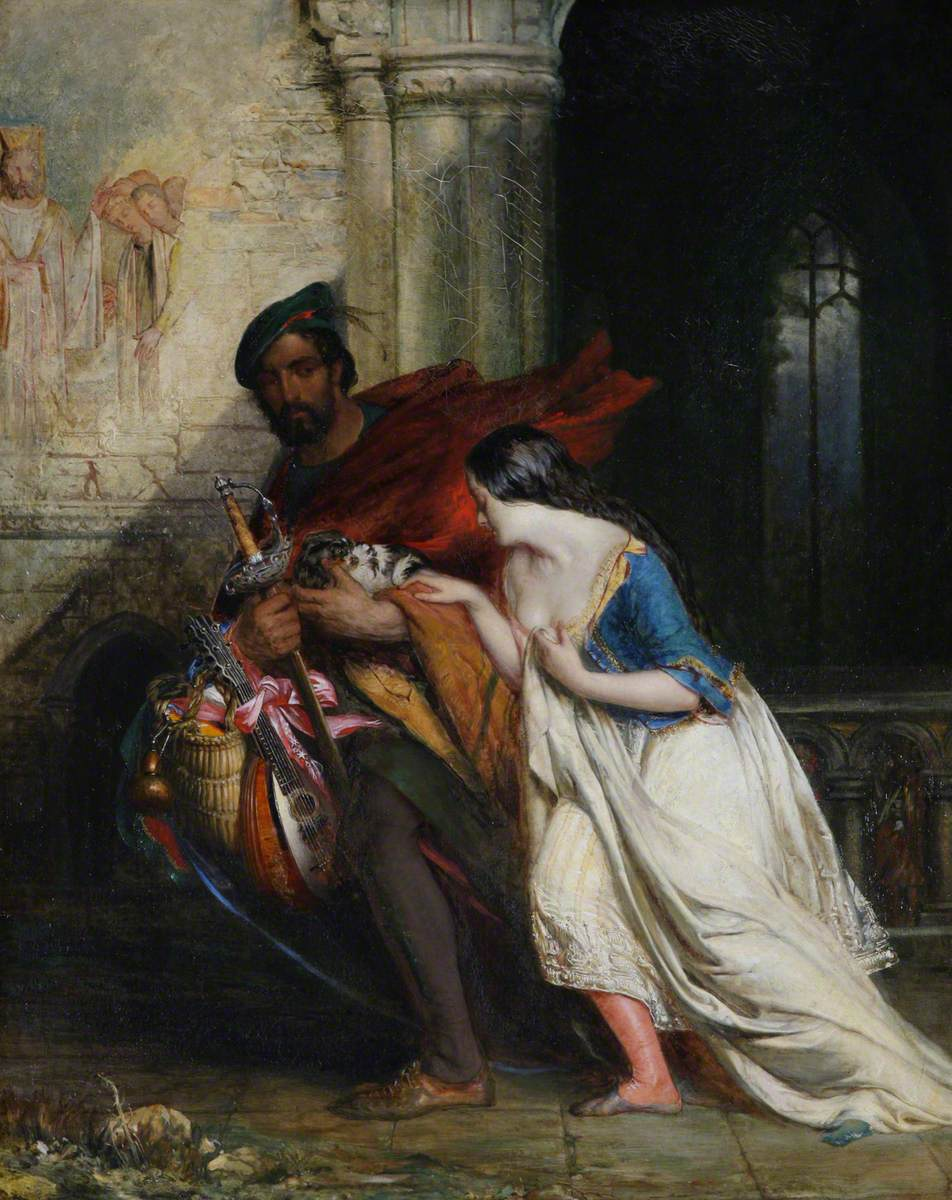
The Glee Maiden by Robert Scott Lauder

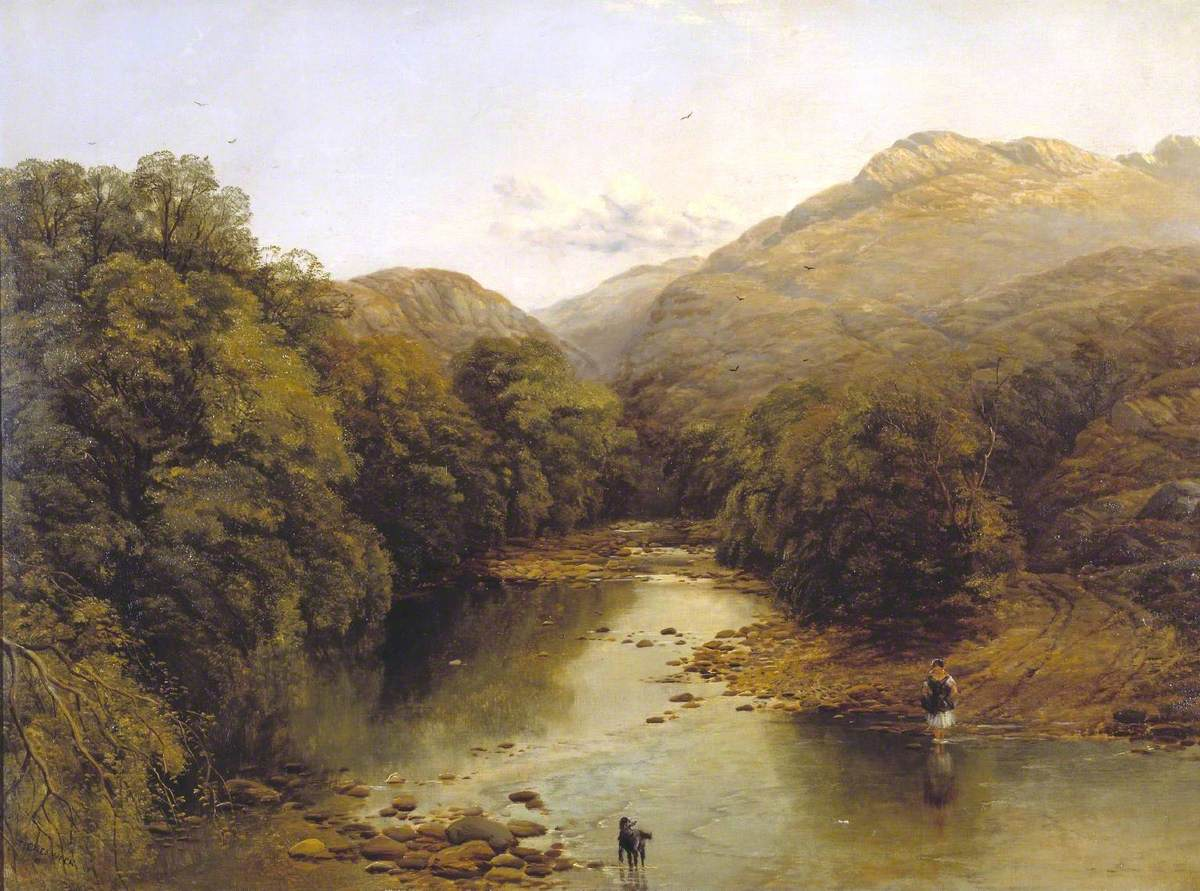
The Ford by Thomas Creswick

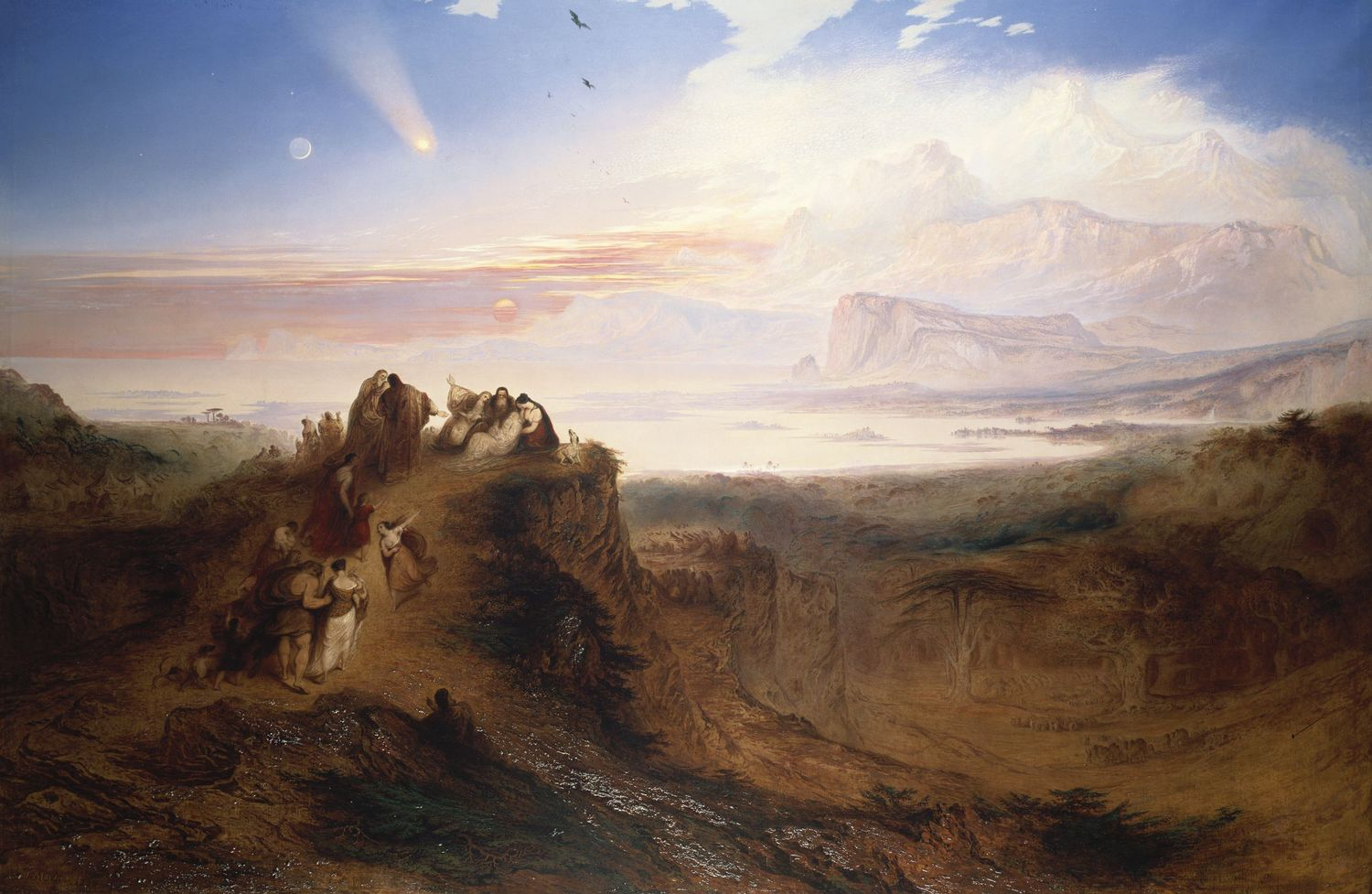
The Eve of the Deluge by John Martin

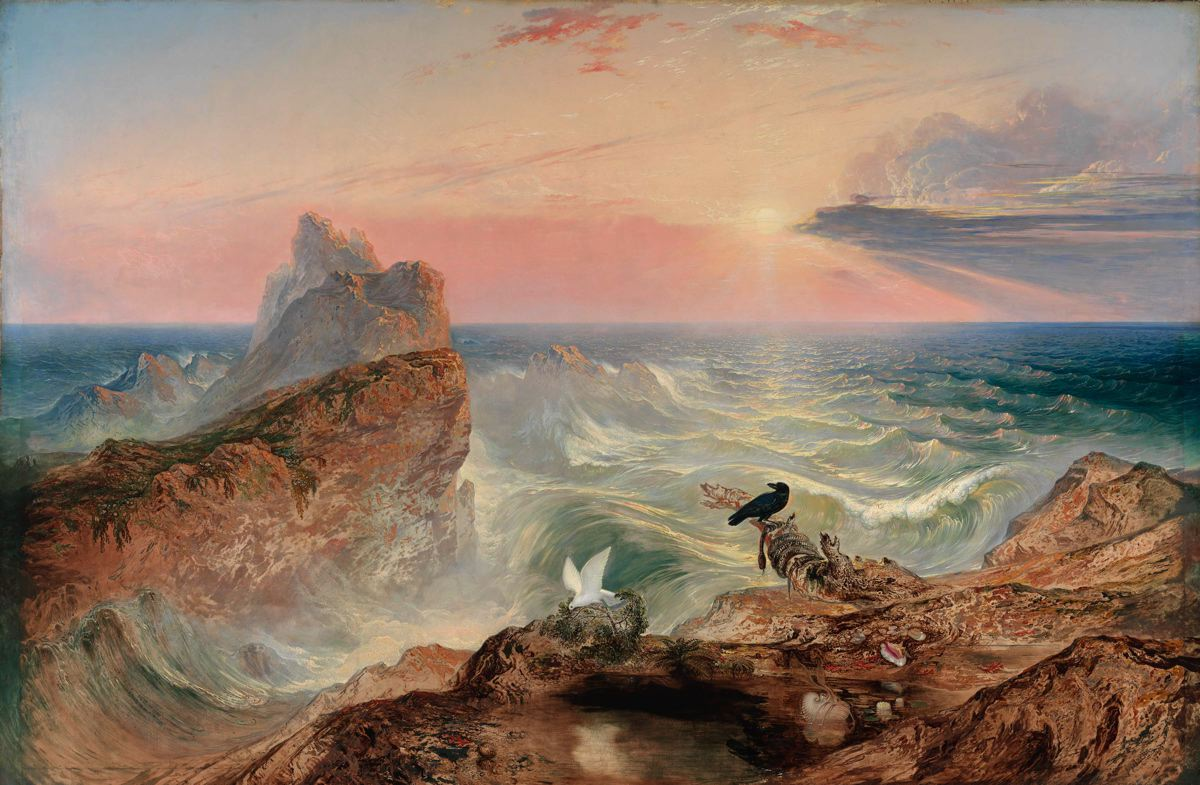
The Assuaging of the Waters by John Martin

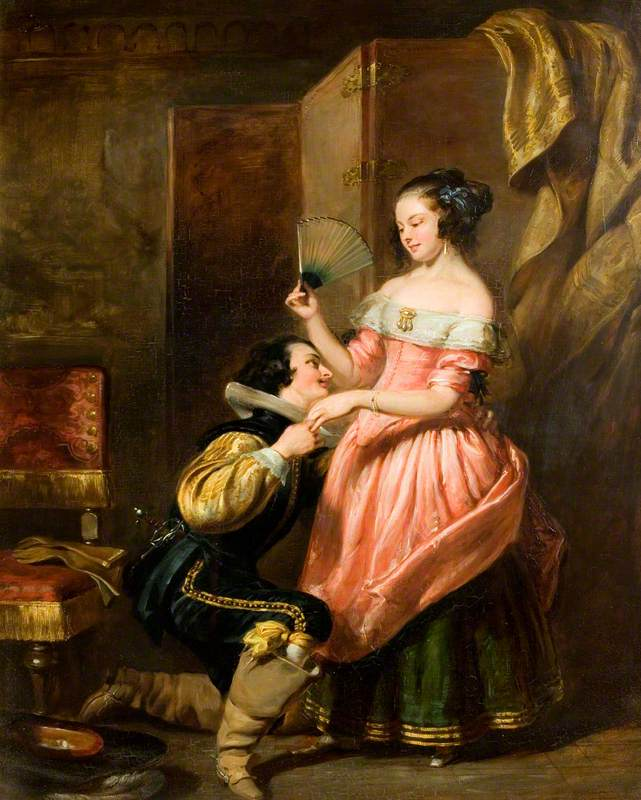
Gil Blas Introducing Himself to Laura by William Simson

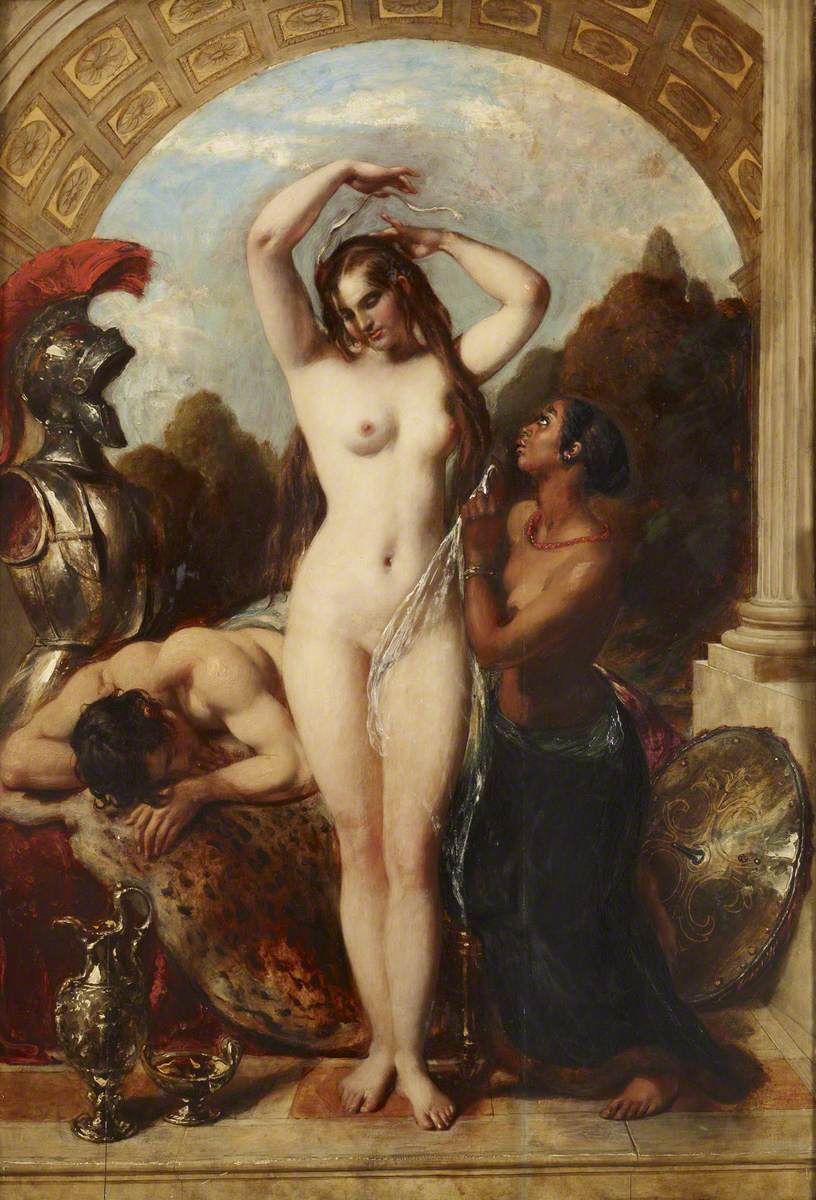
Mars, Venus and an Attendant Derobing her Mistress for the Bath by William Etty

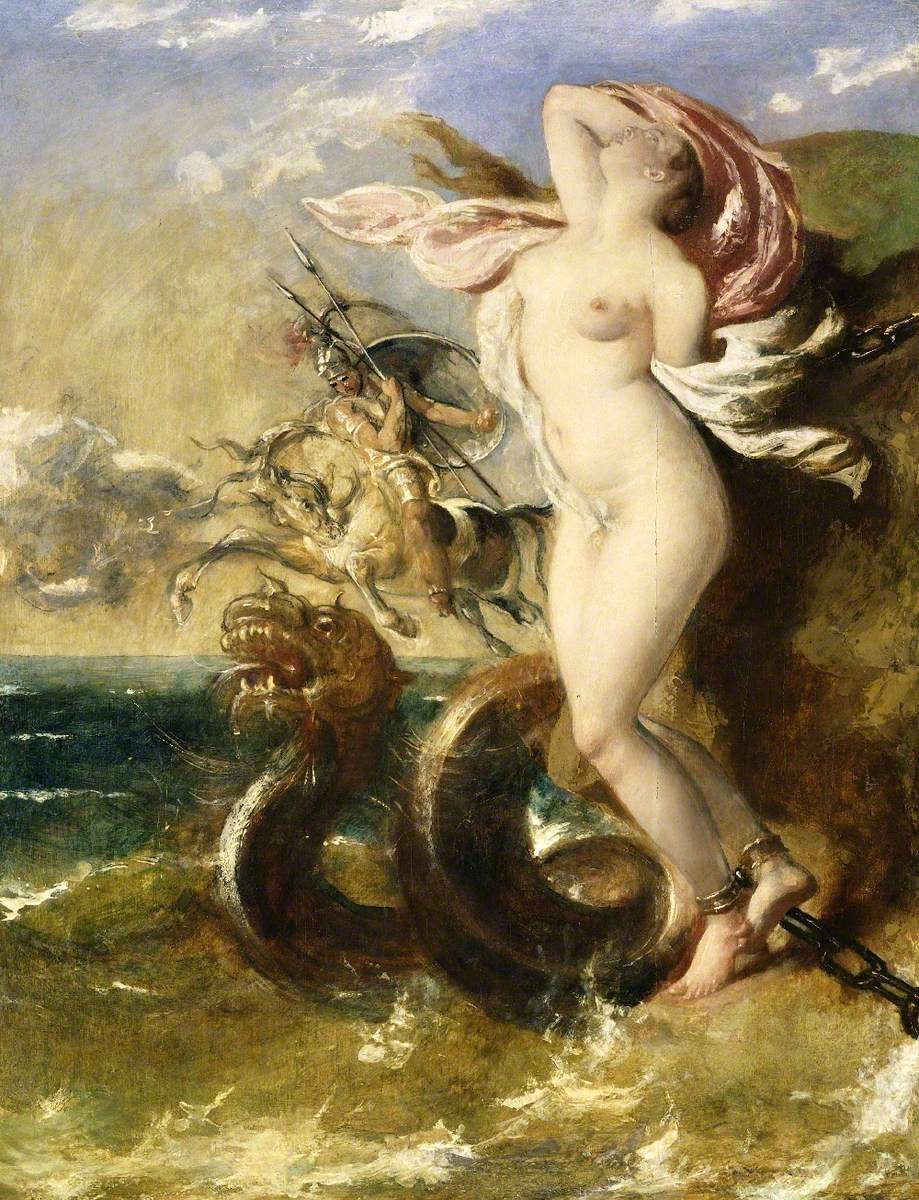
Andromeda, Perseus Coming to Her Rescue by William Etty

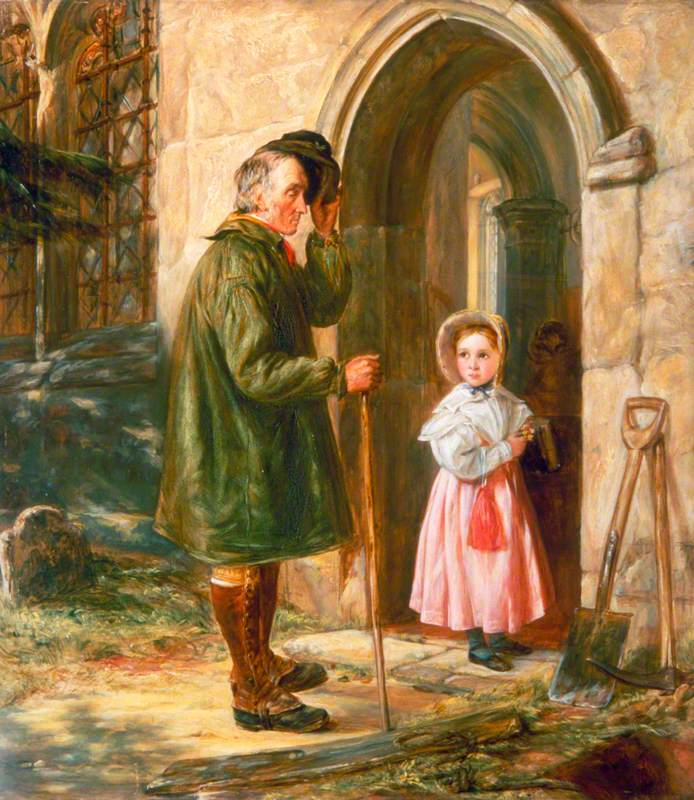
The Contrast by John Callcott Horsley

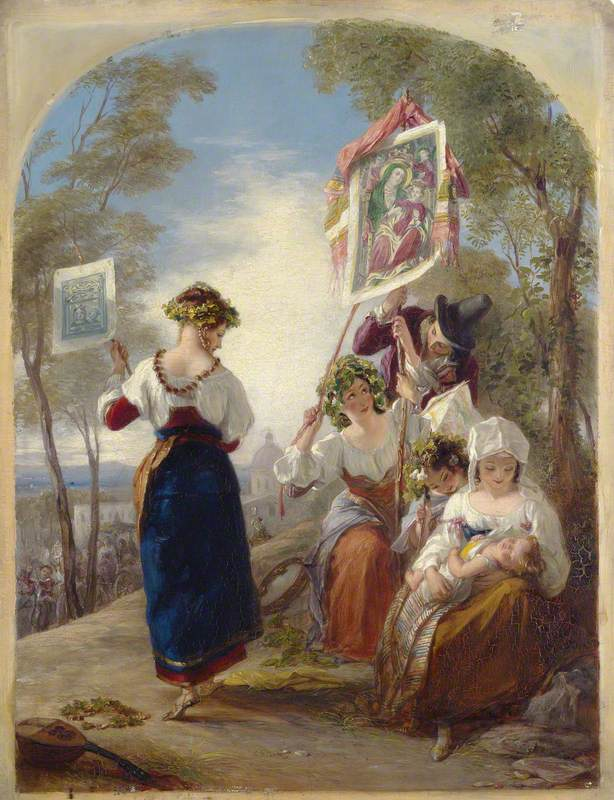
Neapolitan Peasants at the Festa of the Madonna dell'Arco by Thomas Uwins

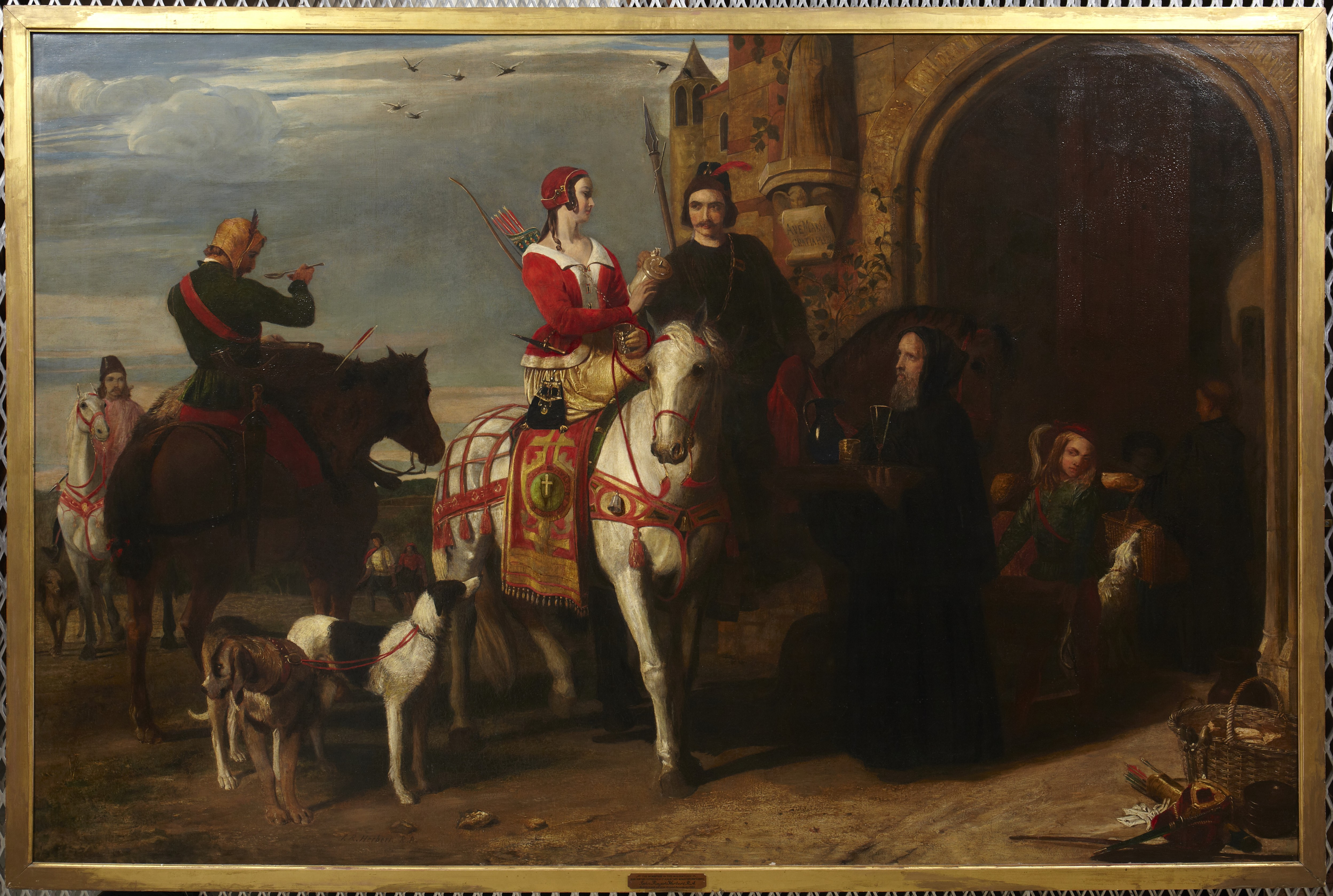
Boar Hunters Refreshed at Saint Augustine's Monastery, Canterbury by John Rogers Herbert

The Banquet Scene in Macbeth by Daniel Maclise

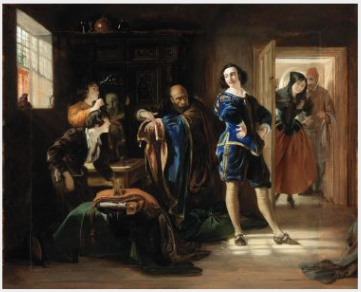
A Scene from Gil Blas by Daniel Maclise

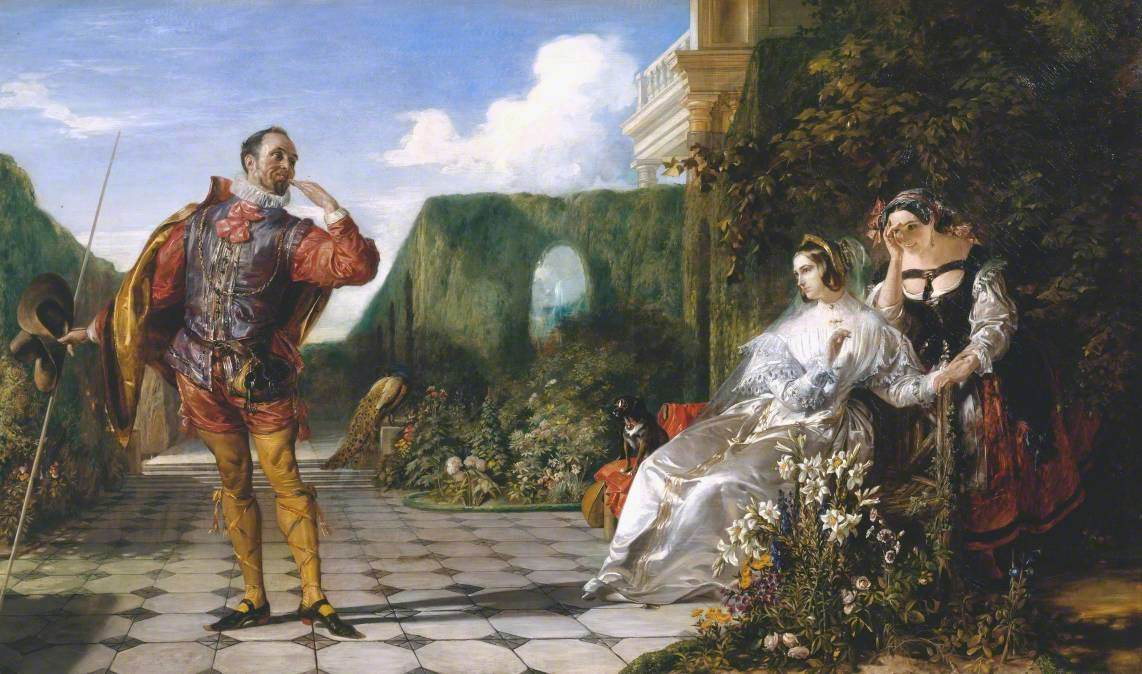
Malvolio and the Countess by Daniel Maclise

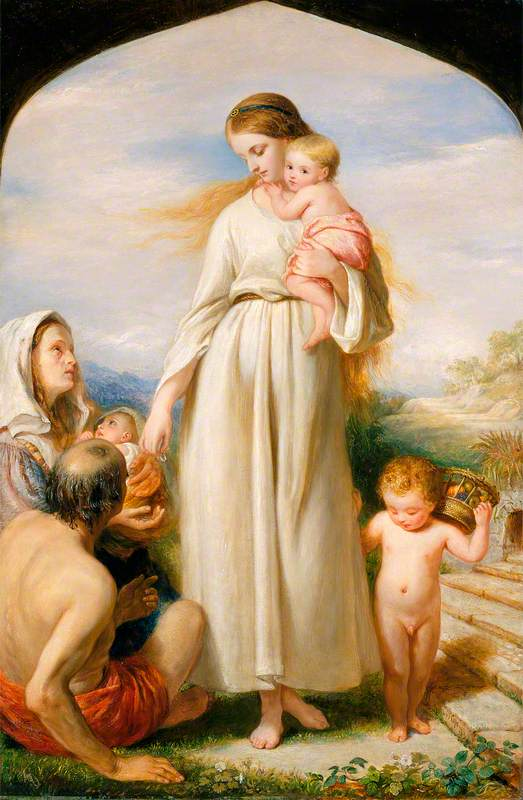
Almsgiving by Charles West Cope

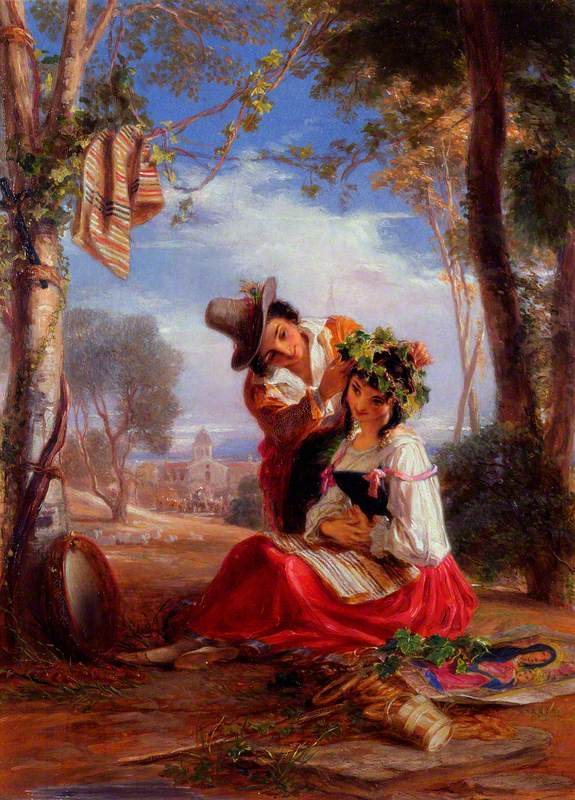
A Neapolitan Boy Decorating the Head of His Innamorata by Thomas Uwins

Ave Maria Scene Near Tivoli by William Collins

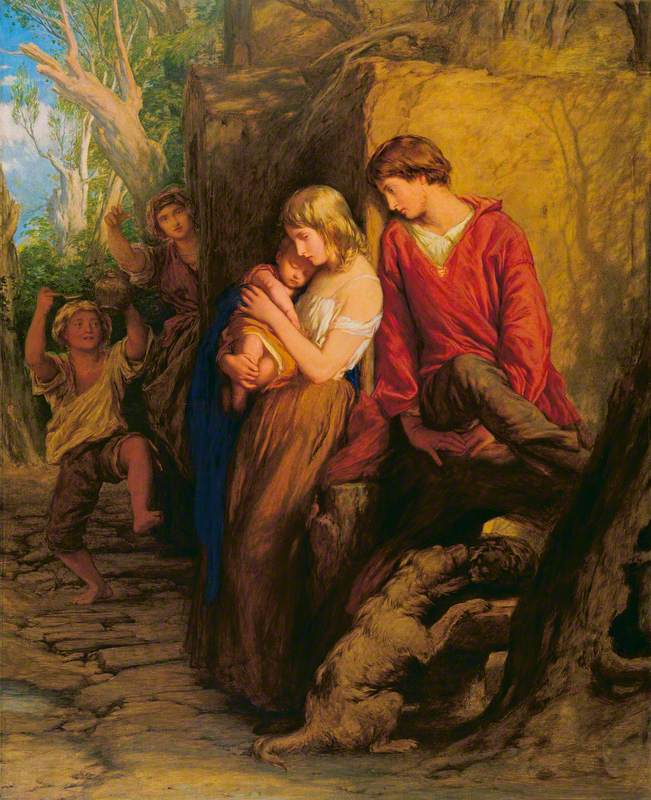
First Love by William Mulready

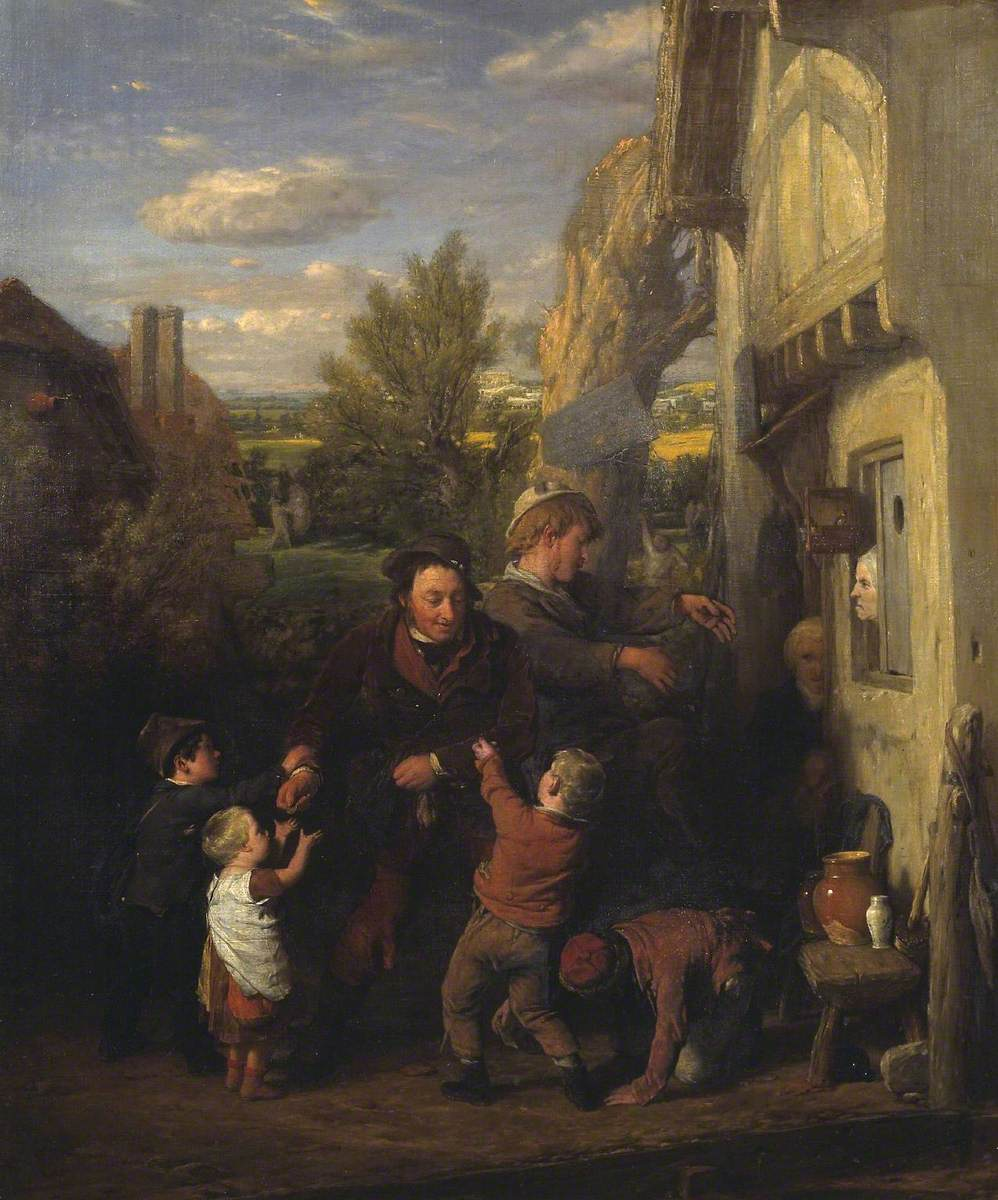
Fair Time by William Mulready

Great Temple at Edfou by David Roberts

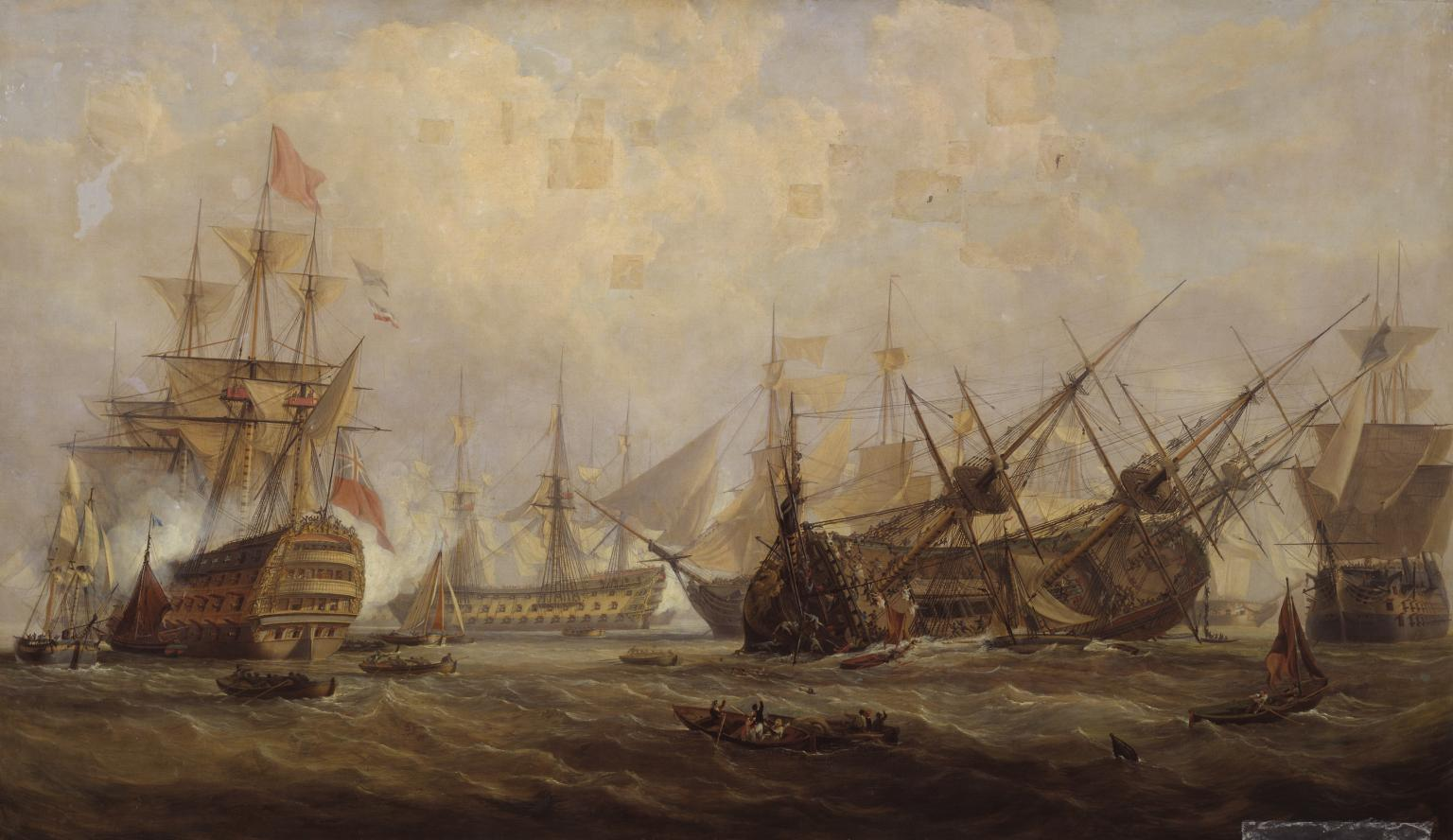
Loss of the Royal George by John Christian Schetky

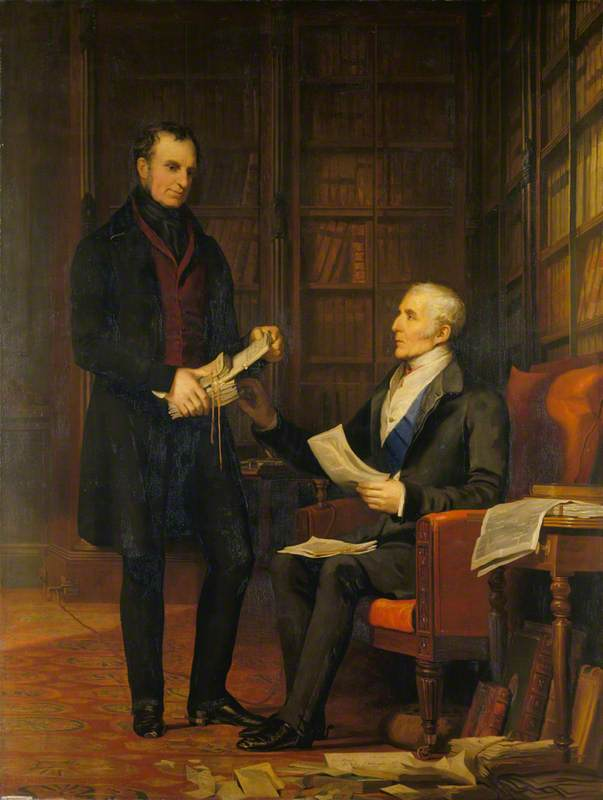
The Duke of Wellington with Colonel Gurwood at Apsley House by Andrew Morton

Portrait of Mary Shelley by Richard Rothwell

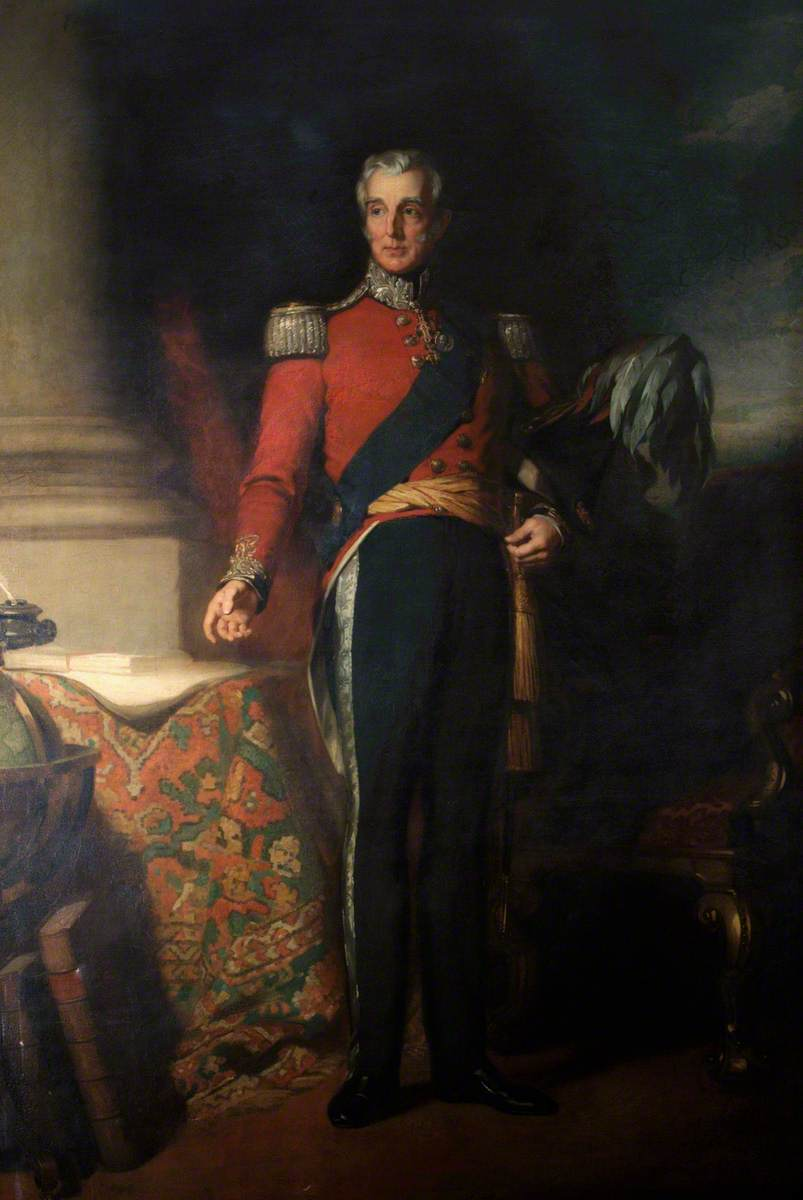
Portrait of the Duke of Wellington by John Lucas

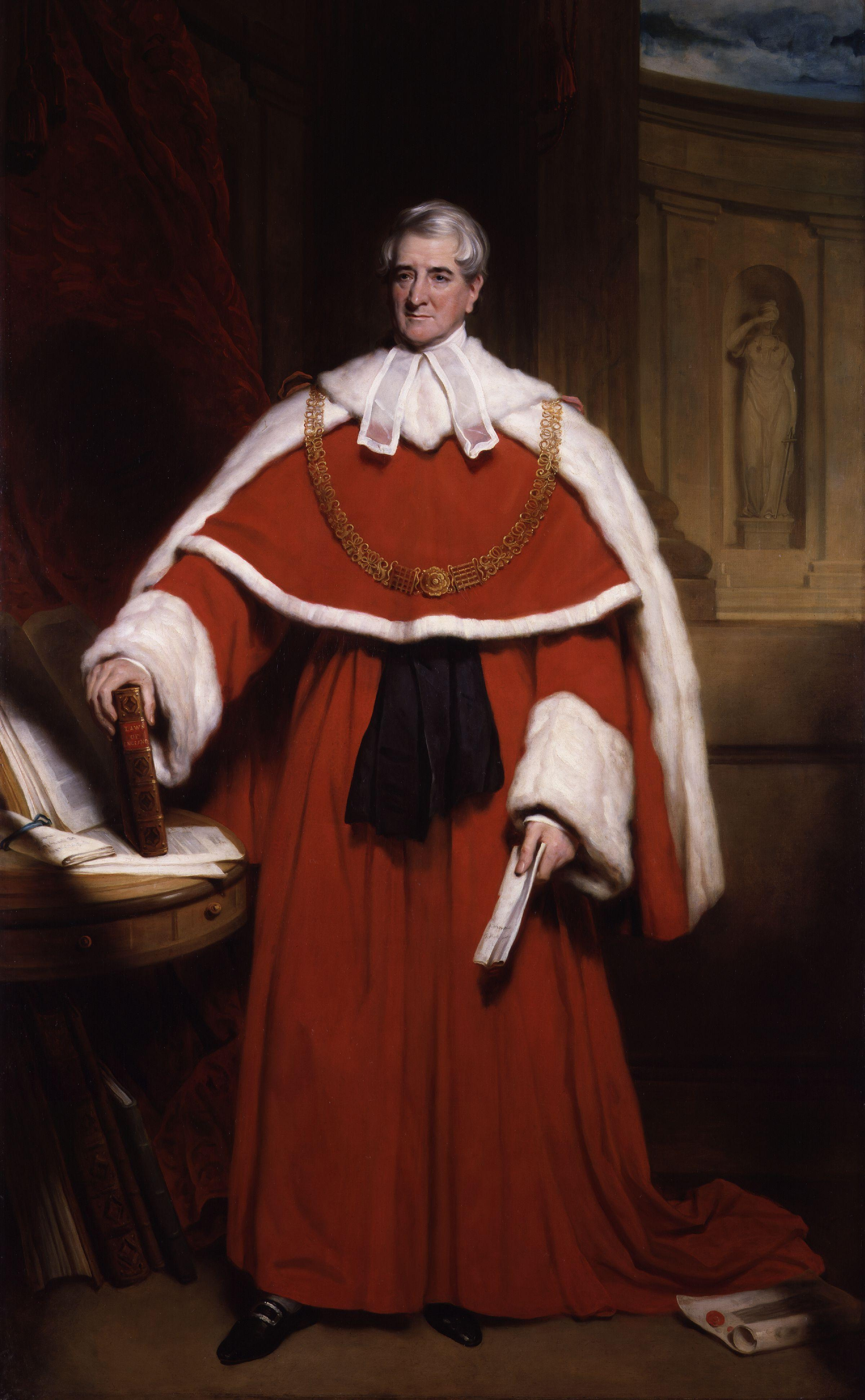
Portrait of Lord Denman by Martin Archer Shee, previously displayed at Exhibition of 1833

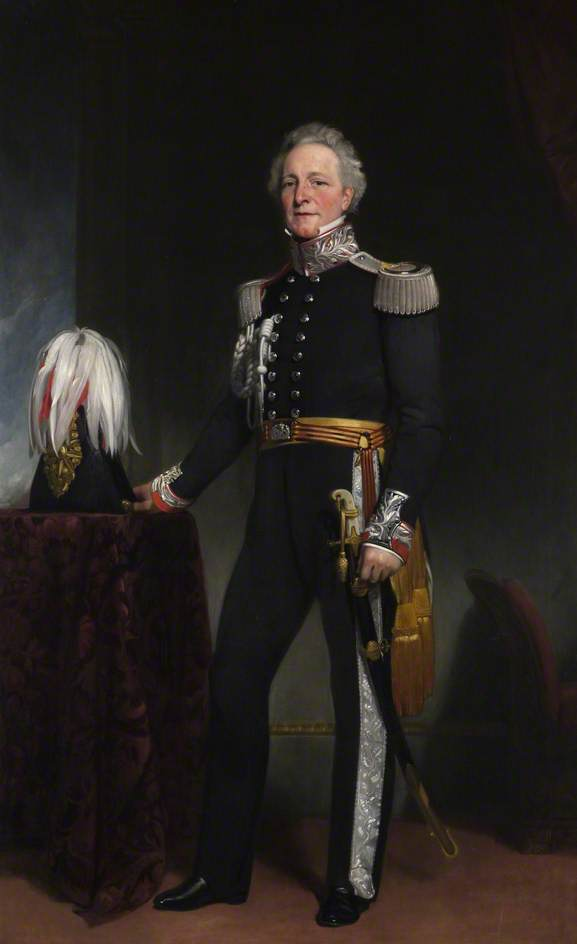
Portrait of James Rivett-Carnac by Henry William Pickersgill

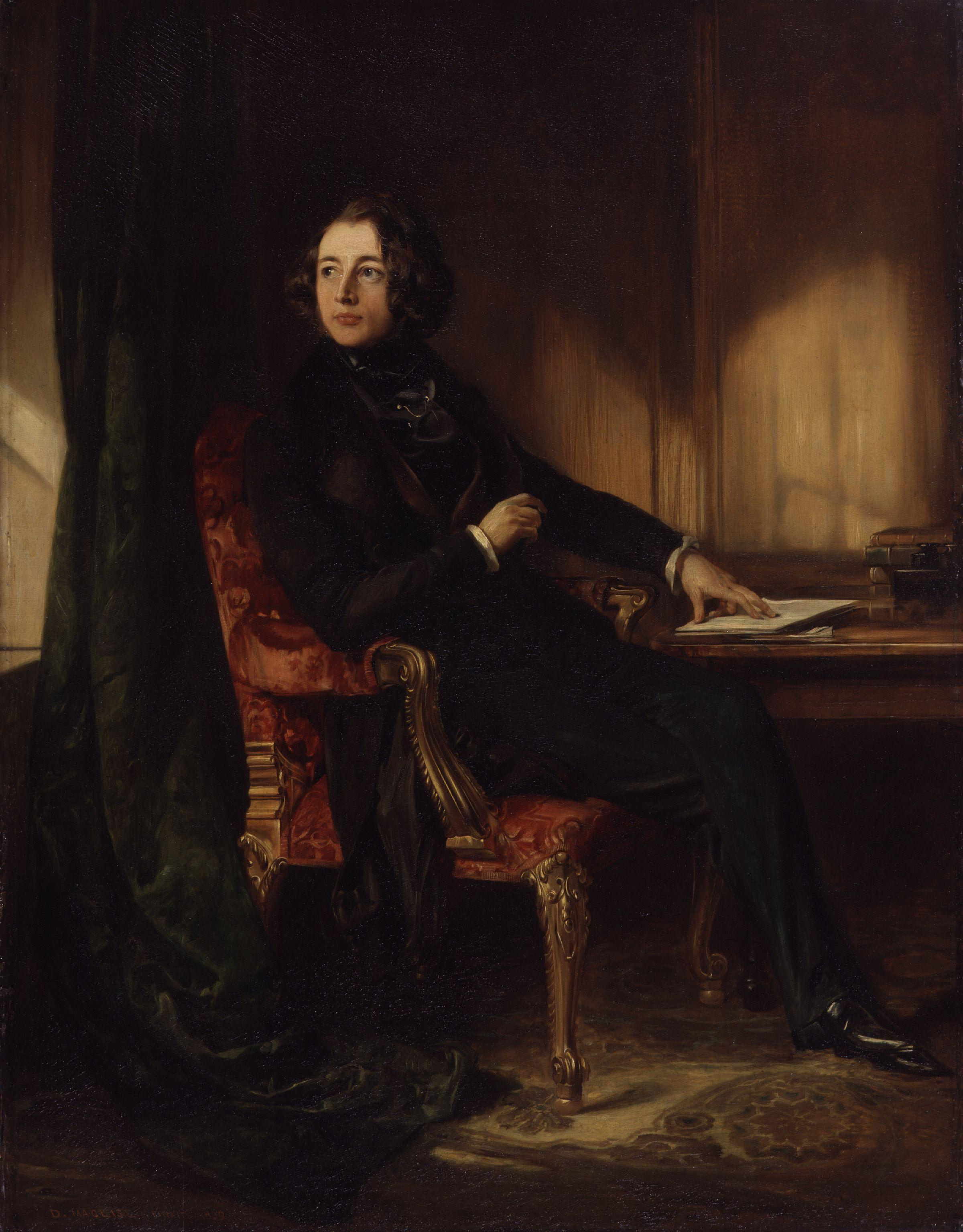
Portrait of Charles Dickens by Daniel Maclise

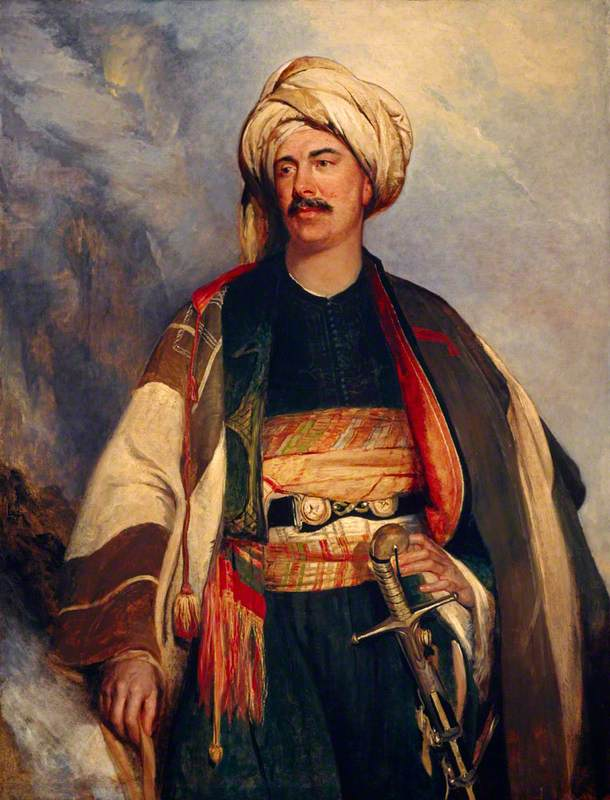
Portrait of David Roberts by Robert Scott Lauder

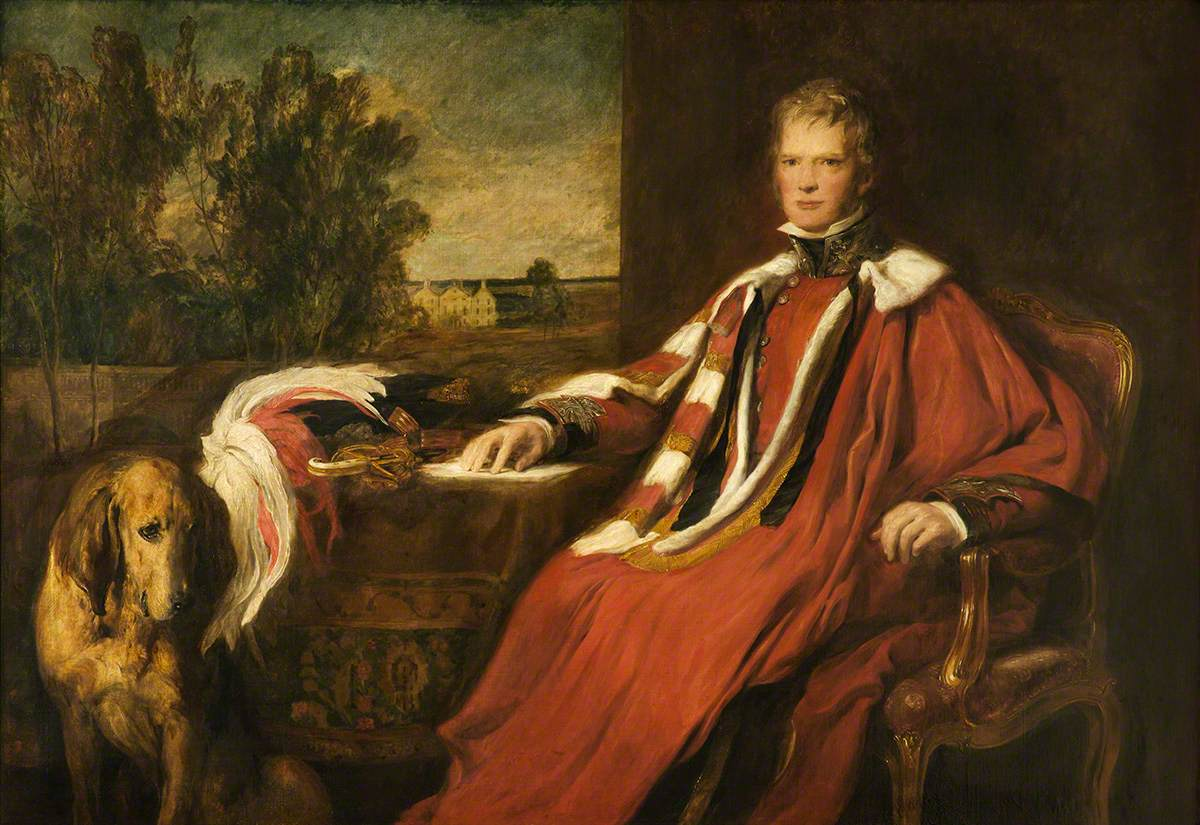
Portrait of Lord Arbuthnott by David Wilkie

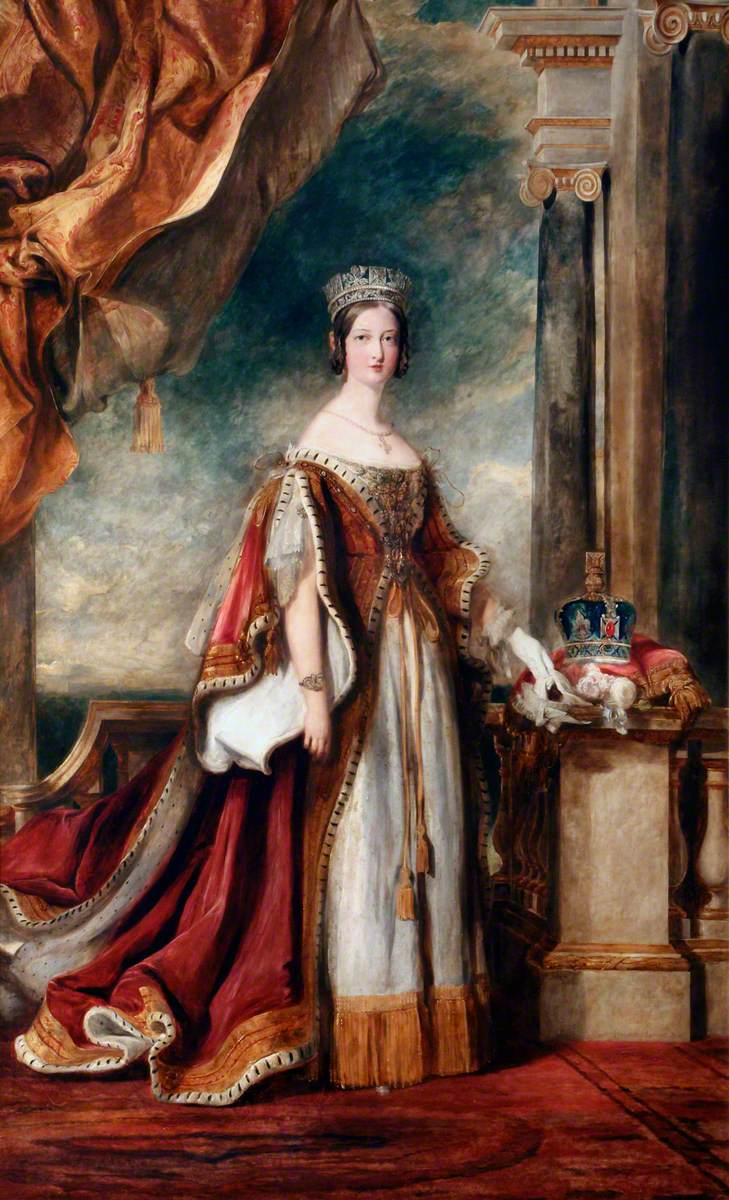
Portrait of Queen Victoria by David Wilkie

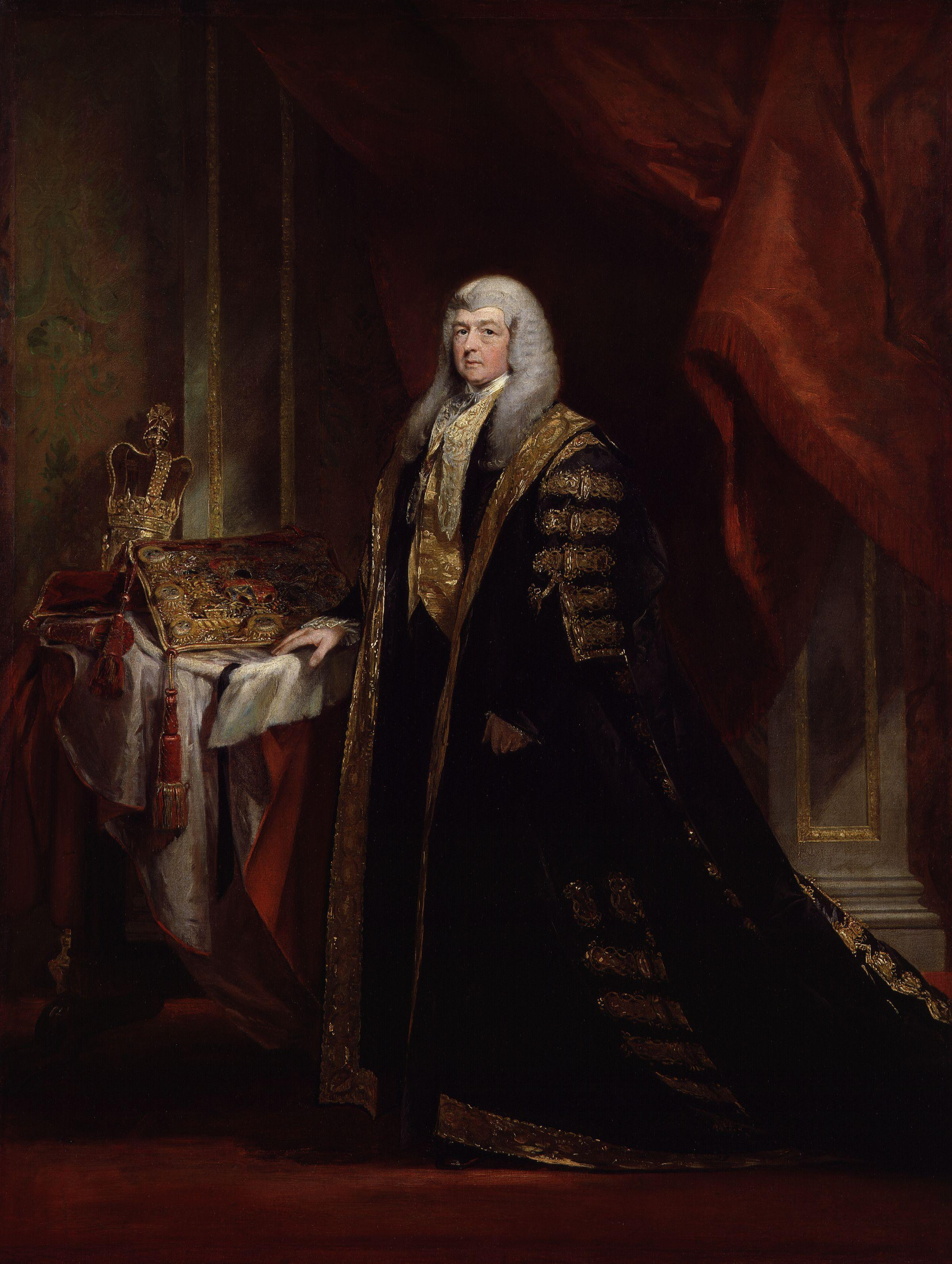
Portrait of Earl of Cottenham by Charles Robert Leslie

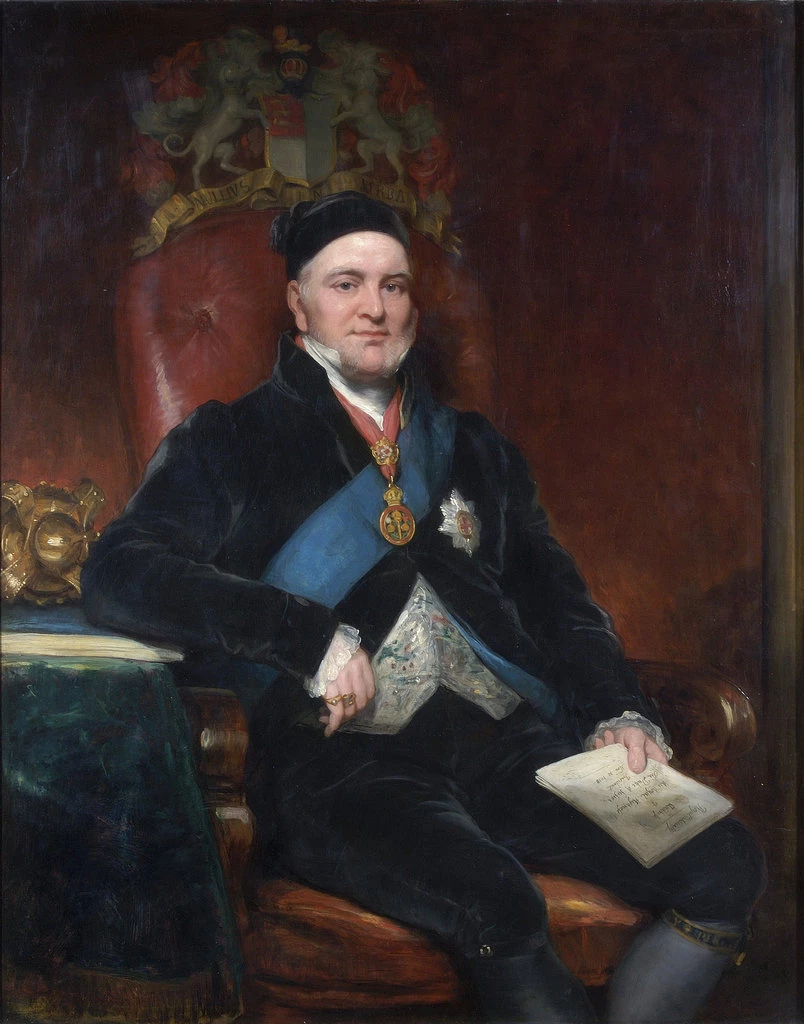
Portrait of the Duke of Sussex by Thomas Phillips

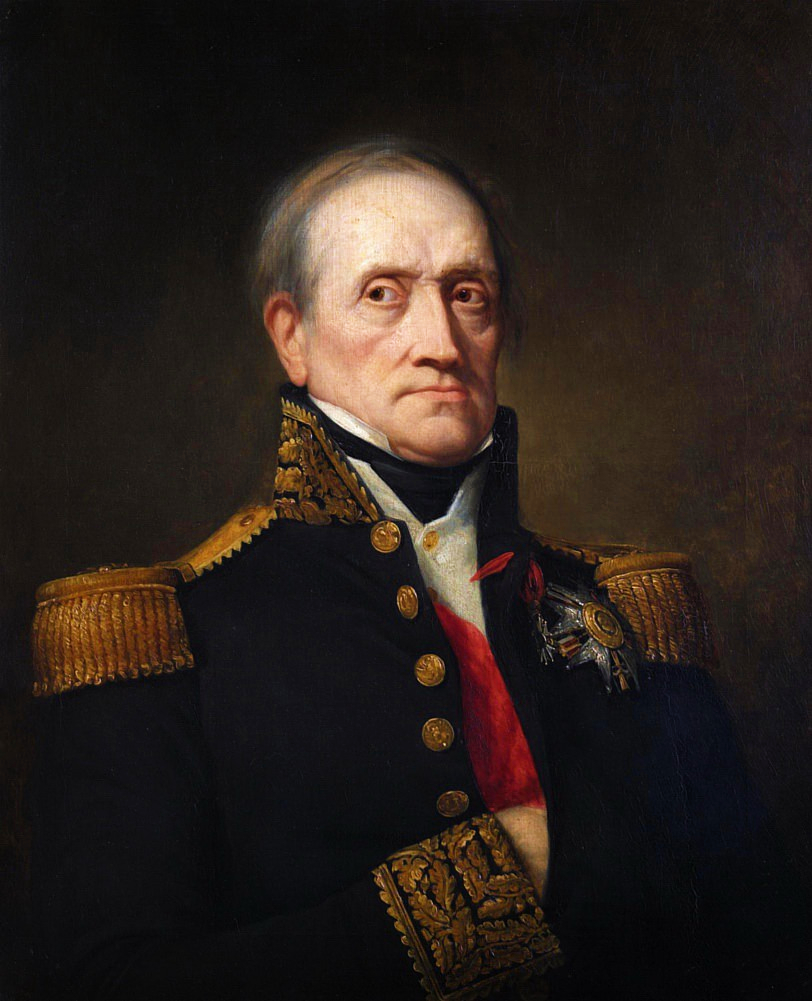
Portrait of Marshal Soult by George Peter Alexander Healy

Portrait of John Whichelo by George Frederick Watts

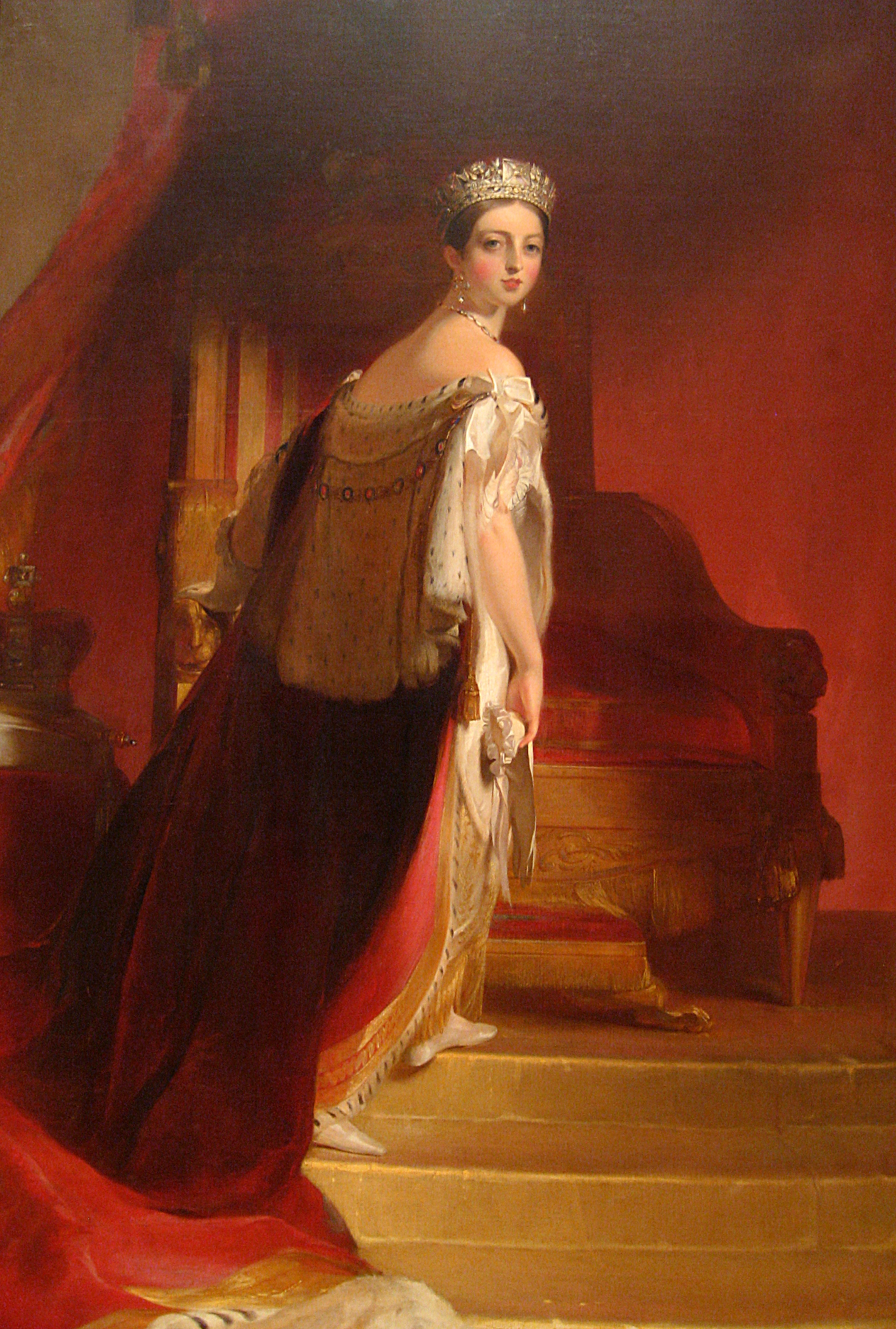
Portrait of Queen Victoria by Thomas Sully

== See also ==
- Salon of 1840, held at the Louvre in Paris

== Bibliography ==
- Hamilton, James. Turner – A Life. Sceptre, 1998.
- Herrmann, Luke. J.M.W. Turner. Oxford University Press, 2007.
- Murray, Peter. Daniel Maclise, 1806–1870: Romancing the Past. Crawford Art Gallery, 2009.
- Ormond, Richard. Sir Edwin Landseer. Philadelphia Museum of Art, 1981.
- Shanes, Eric. The Life and Masterworks of J.M.W. Turner. Parkstone International, 2012.
- Tromans, Nicholas. David Wilkie: The People's Painter. Edinburgh University Press, 2007.
- Weston, Nancy. Daniel Maclise: Irish Artist in Victorian London. Four Courts Press, 2009.
