= Neapolitan Fisher Girls Surprised Bathing by Moonlight =

Painting by J. M. W. Turner

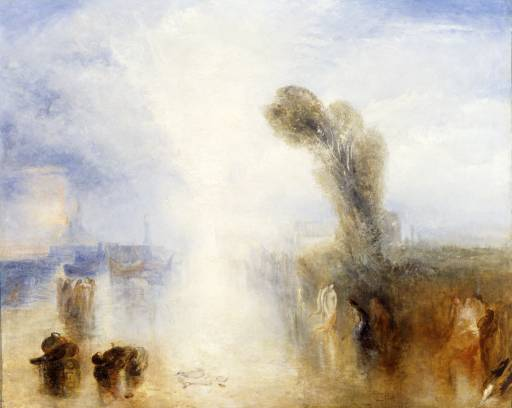
- Artist: J. M. W. Turner
- Year: 1840
- Type: Oil on canvas, landscape painting
- Dimensions: 65.7 cm × 81 cm (25.9 in × 32 in)
- Location: Huntington Library, San Marino, California

Neapolitan Fisher Girls Surprised Bathing by Moonlight is an 1840 landscape painting by the British artist J.M.W. Turner. It depicts a view of the Bay of Naples with fisherwomen bathing in the water in the moonlight. They are surprised by the eruption of Mount Vesuvius in the distance. Turner had visited Naples in 1819 during a tour or Italy and the image was inspired by sketches he had made.

By this stage in his career Turner was increasingly experimenting with the use of light in his works. The painting was displayed at the Royal Academy's Exhibition of 1840 at the National Gallery in London. Turner was one of the most prominent members of the Academy and exhibited works frequently at the Summer Exhibition. The work was acquired by the art collector Robert Vernon. Today the painting is in the collection of the Huntington Library in San Marino, California.

== See also ==
- List of paintings by J. M. W. Turner

== Bibliography ==
- Bailey, Anthony. J.M.W. Turner: Standing in the Sun. Tate Enterprises Ltd, 2013.
- Costello, Leo. J.M.W. Turner and the Subject of History. Routledge, 2017.
- Hamilton, James. Turner - A Life. Sceptre, 1998.
- Smiles, Sam. The Turner Book: Tate Essential Artists Series. Harry N. Abrams, 2006.
