= Andromeda, Perseus Coming to Her Rescue =

Painting by William Etty

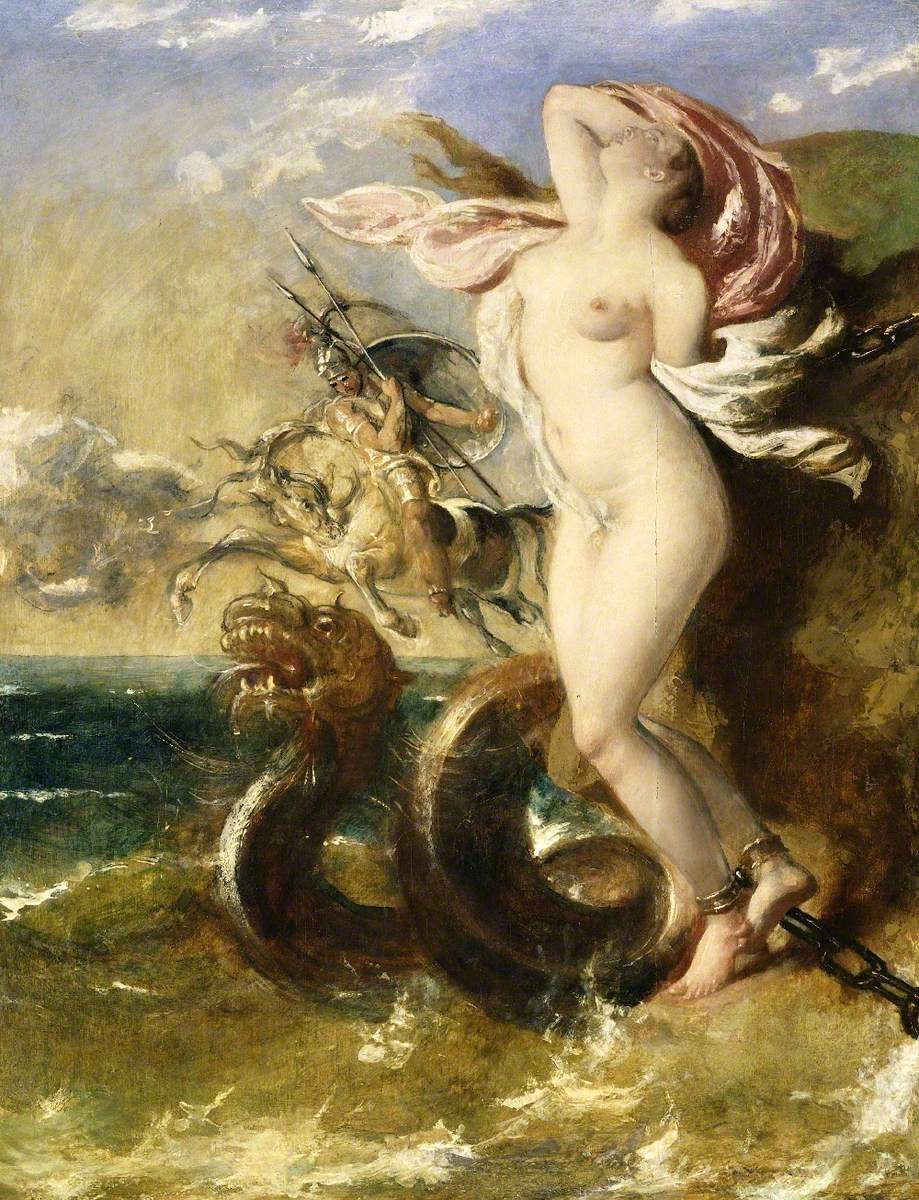
- Artist: William Etty
- Year: c.1840
- Type: Oil on canvas, history painting
- Dimensions: 85.1 cm × 62.5 cm (33.5 in × 24.6 in)
- Location: Royal Albert Memorial Museum, Exeter

Andromeda, Perseus Coming to Her Rescue is an c.1840 oil painting by the British artist William Etty. It depicts a scene from Ancient Greek Mythology. The princess Andromeda is shown chained to a rock and threatened by the sea monster Cetus. While her rescuer Perseus is usually portrayed as a dominant towering figure, in both this and another painting of the scene by Etty he is reduced to a small background figure.

The painting was displayed at the Royal Academy Exhibition of 1840 at the National Gallery in London. Today it is in the Royal Albert Memorial Museum in Exeter, having been acquired in 1972.

== Bibliography ==
- Kern, Stephen. Eyes of Love: he Gaze in English and French Paintings and Novels, 1840–1900. Reaktion Books, 1996.
- Robinson, Leonard. William Etty: The Life and Art. McFarland, 2007.
