= Portico of the Great Temple at Baalbec =

Painting by David Roberts

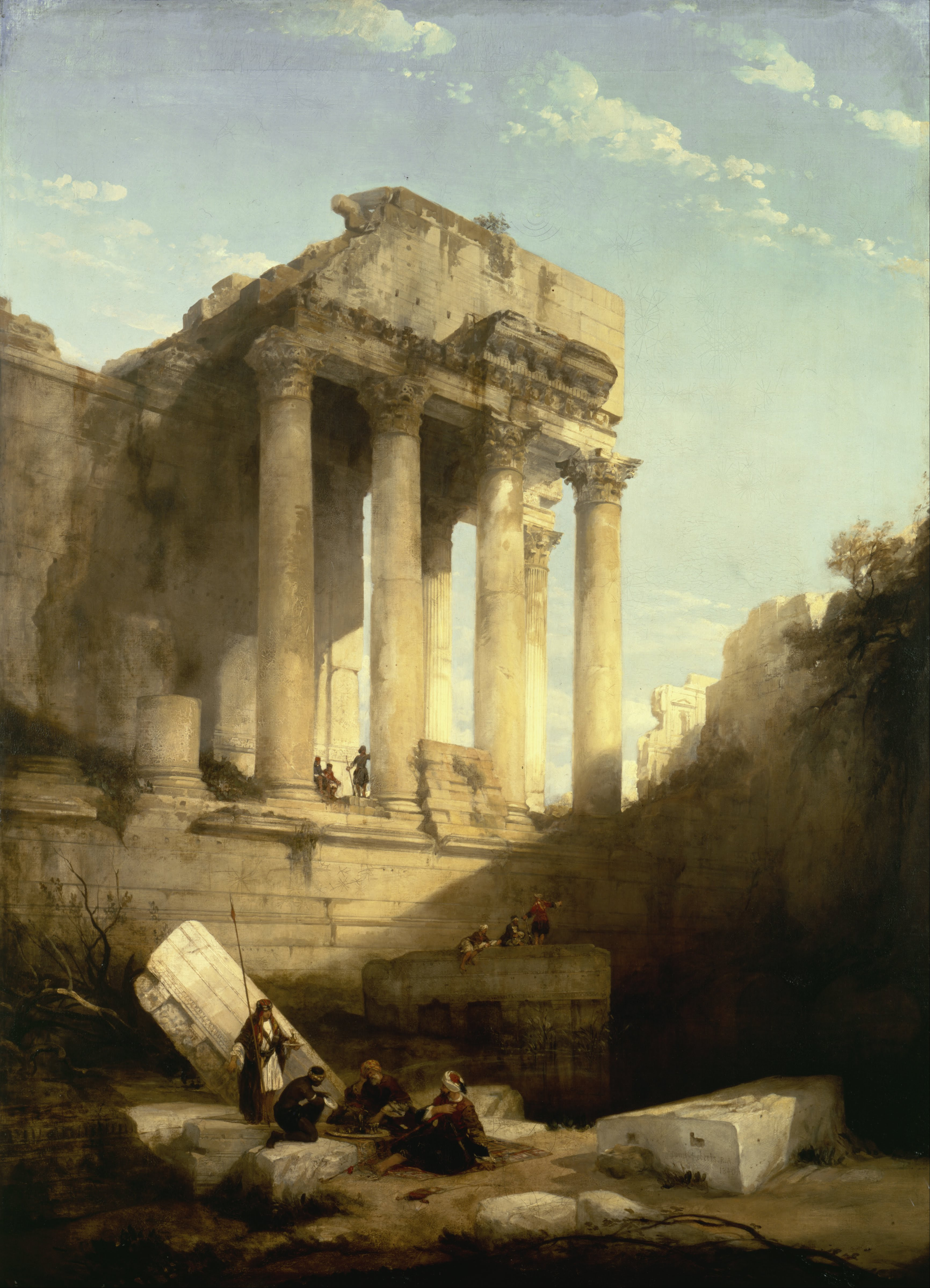
- Artist: David Roberts
- Year: 1840
- Type: Oil on canvas, landscape painting
- Dimensions: 182.2 cm × 132 cm (71.7 in × 52 in)
- Location: Walker Art Gallery, Liverpool

Portico of the Great Temple at Baalbec is an 1840 oil painting by the British artist David Roberts. It depicts the ruined ancient Roman temple complex at the city of Baalbek in Lebanon, which Roberts had visited the previous year during a lengthy trip round the Middle East. This provided the inspiration for a series of paintings and lithographs produced by Roberts over the following decade.

Roberts considered this to be one of his most successful pictures. It was displayed at the Royal Academy Exhibition of 1840 held at the National Gallery in London and later at the Salon of 1855 in Paris. It was purchased by the shipping magnate Elhanan Bicknell. It is now in the collection of the Walker Art Gallery in Liverpool, which acquired it in 1893. It is also known by the title Baalbec, Ruins of the Temple of Bacchus.

== Bibliography ==
- Guiterman Helen & Llewellyn, Briony. David Roberts. Phaidon Press, 1986.
- Sim, Katherine. David Roberts R.A., 1796–1864: A Biography. Quartet Books, 1984.
