= Nell Gwynn at the Tavern =

Painting by Charles Landseer

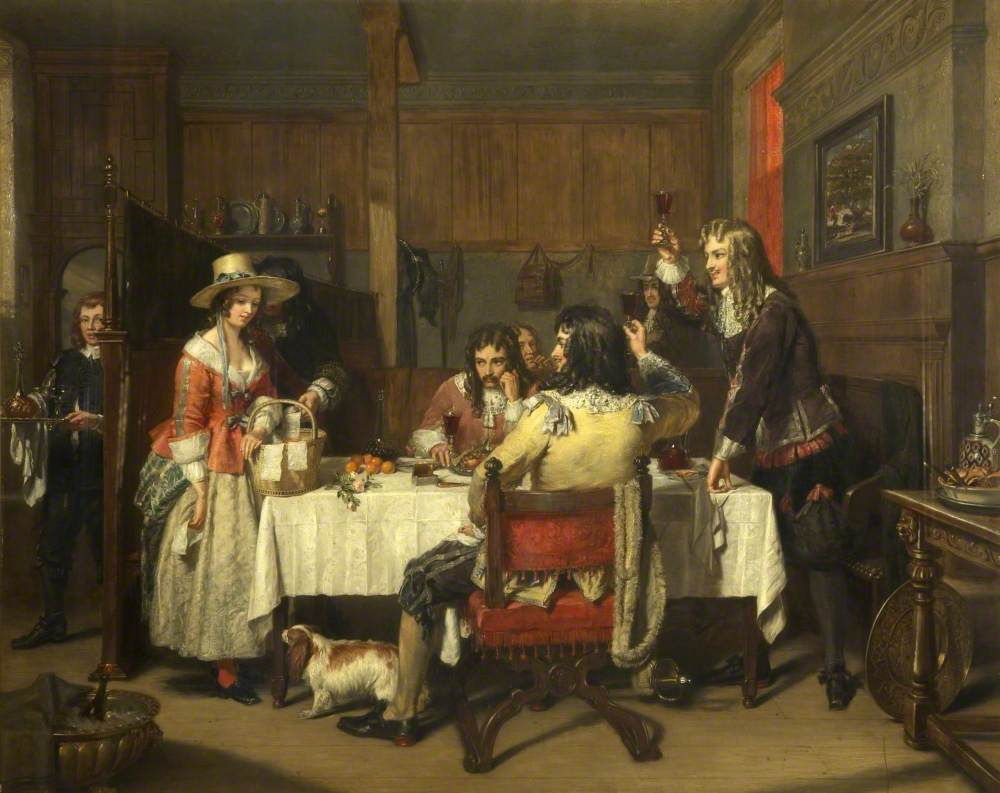
- Artist: Charles Landseer
- Year: 1840
- Type: Oil on canvas, history painting
- Dimensions: 103 cm × 127.6 cm (41 in × 50.2 in)
- Location: Walker Art Gallery, Liverpool

Nell Gwynn at the Tavern is an 1840 oil painting by the British artist Charles Landseer. A history painting it reimagines the meeting between Nell Gwyn and Charles II during the Restoration era. In a London tavern the young ballad seller encounters the king and his associates who raise their glasses of wine to toast her.

Charles was the elder brother Edwin Landseer and was best known for his popular scenes of English history. The painting was displayed at the Royal Academy Exhibition of 1840 held at the National Gallery in London. Today it is part of the collection of the Walker Art Gallery in Liverpool which acquired it in 1925 when it was presented by the art collector George Audley. A print based on the painting was produced by Lumb Stocks in 1845.

== Bibliography ==
- Fenton, James. School of Genius: A History of the Royal Academy of Arts. Harry N. Abrams, 2006.
- Hunnisett, Basil. Steel-Engraved Book Illustration in England. Taylor & Francis, 2021.
- Penketh, Sandra (ed.) Concise Illustrated Catalogue of British Paintings in the Walker Art Gallery and at Sudley. National Museums and Galleries on Merseyside, 1995.
