= Returning from the Ale House =

Painting by William Mulready

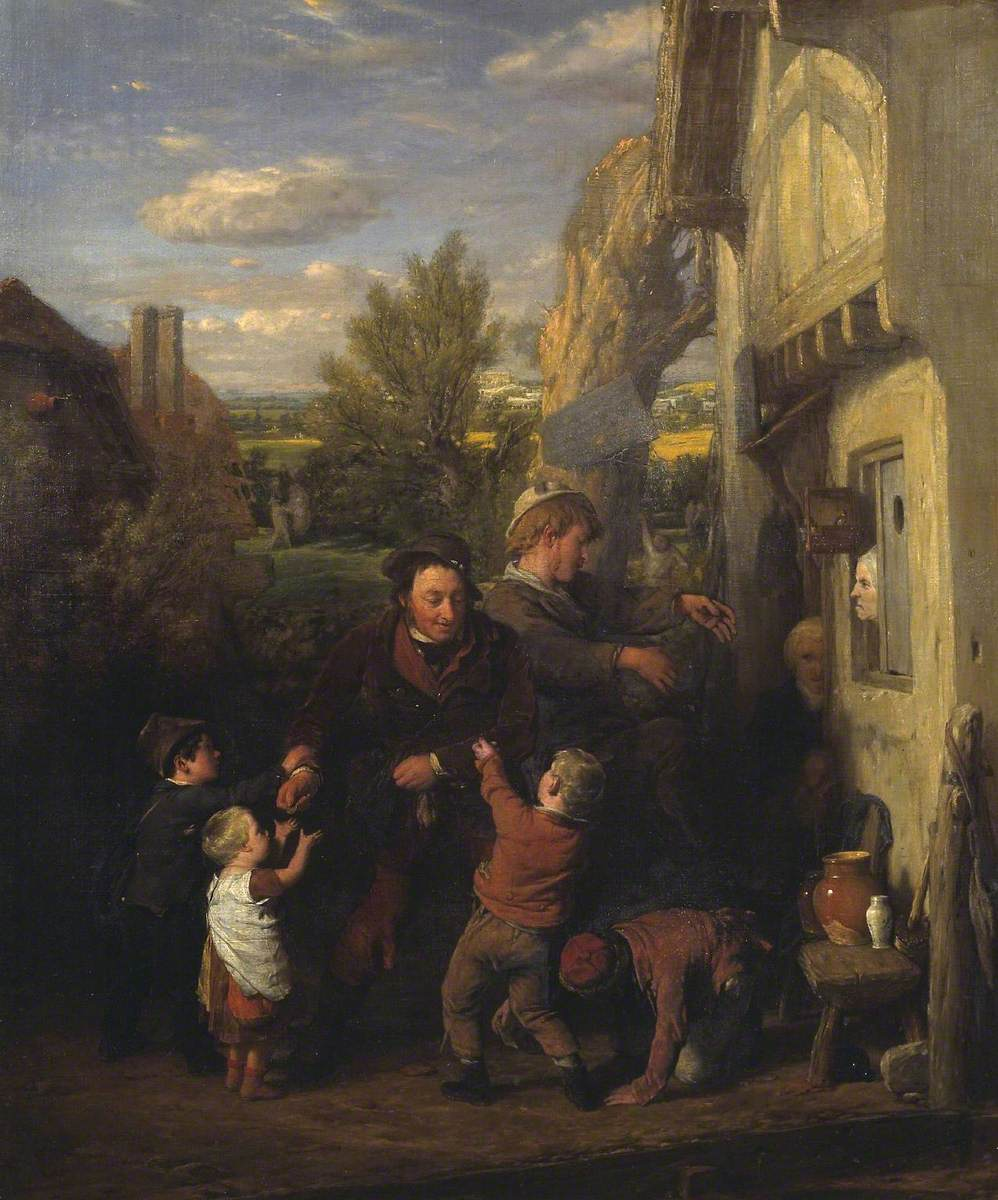
- Artist: William Mulready
- Year: 1809
- Type: Oil on canvas, genre painting
- Dimensions: 78.7 cm × 66 cm (31.0 in × 26 in)
- Location: Tate Britain, London

Returning from the Ale House is an oil on canvas genre painting by the Irish artist William Mulready, from 1809. It is held at the Tate Britain, in London.

== Description ==
It shows a scene in an English village where two drunken men stagger home after a heavy session at the ale house. They toss coins to the village children, who seem very eager to receive them, while two dour schoolmasters look on. A landscape with some trees serves as the background of the scene. Mulready was a noted rival of the established leader of British genre scenes of the Regency era David Wilkie.

The painting was first displayed at the Royal Academy's Summer Exhibition of 1809, at Somerset House, where it was heavily criticised for its perceived celebration of drunkenness. Three decades later in 1839, Mulready retouched the painting, and sent it into the Royal Academy Exhibition of 1840 at the National Gallery, under the new title Fair Time where it enjoyed a more favourable reception. It was acquired by the art collector Robert Vernon who donated it to the nation as part of the Vernon Gift in 1847. Today it is in the collection of the Tate Britain.

== Bibliography ==
- Solkin, David H. Painting Out of the Ordinary: Modernity and the Art of Everyday Life in Early Nineteenth-century Britain. Yale University Press, 2009.
- Tromans, Nicholas. David Wilkie: The People's Painter. Edinburgh University Press, 2007.
- Wright, Christopher, Gordon, Catherine May & Smith, Mary Peskett. British and Irish Paintings in Public Collections: An Index of British and Irish Oil Paintings by Artists Born Before 1870 in Public and Institutional Collections in the United Kingdom and Ireland. Yale University Press, 2006.
