= Portrait of David Roberts =

Painting by Robert Scott Lauder

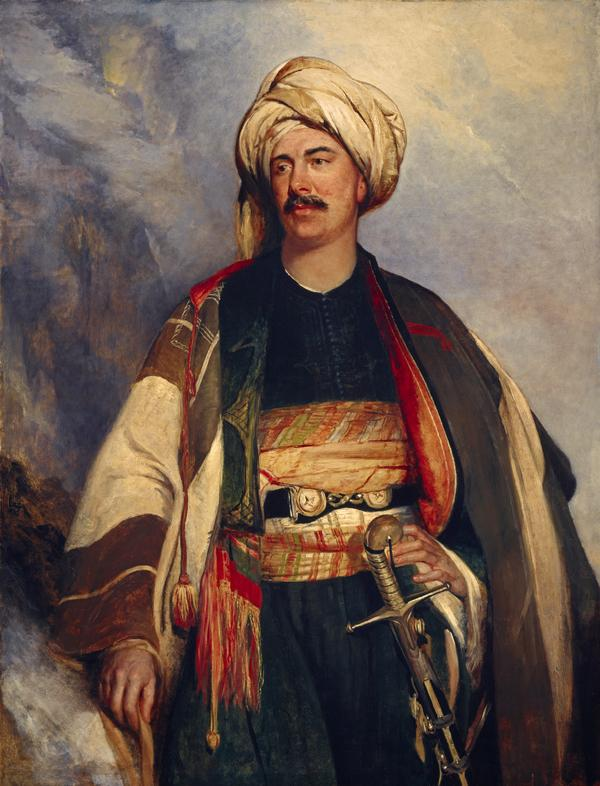
- Artist: Robert Scott Lauder
- Year: 1840
- Type: Oil on canvas, portrait painting
- Dimensions: 133 cm × 101.3 cm (52 in × 39.9 in)
- Location: Scottish National Portrait Gallery, Edinburgh

Portrait of David Roberts is an 1840 portrait painting by the British artist Robert Scott Lauder. It depicts his friend and fellow Scottish painter David Roberts in Arab dress. Roberts was known for his journeys through and depictions of the Middle East, later included in his travelogue The Holy Land, Syria, Idumea, Arabia, Egypt, and Nubia. The work was commissioned on Roberts' return to Britain by their mutual friend David Ramsay and portrays him in the actual costume he had acquired in Cairo.

The work was displayed at the Royal Academy Exhibition of 1840 in London. Today the painting is in the collection of the Scottish National Portrait Gallery in Edinburgh, having been purchased in 1980.

== Bibliography ==
- Burritt, Amanda M. Visualising Britain's Holy Land in the Nineteenth Century. Springer Nature, 2020.
- Mancoff, Debra N. David Roberts: Travels in Egypt & the Holy Land. Pomegranate, 1999.
- Sim, Katherine. David Roberts R.A., 1796–1864: A Biography. Quartet Books, 1984.
