= The Banquet Scene in Macbeth =

Painting by Daniel Maclise

The Banquet Scene from Macbeth
- Artist: Daniel Maclise
- Year: 1840
- Type: Oil on canvas, history painting
- Dimensions: 183 cm × 305 cm (72 in × 120 in)
- Location: Guildhall Art Gallery, London

The Banquet Scene in Macbeth is an 1840 history painting by the Irish artist Daniel Maclise. Painted in the Romantic style, it depicts the banquet scene from William Shakespeare's tragedy Macbeth.

Maclise produced a number of pictures based on plays by Shakespeare. The work was displayed at the Royal Academy Exhibition of 1840 at the National Gallery in London. In 1857 it was featured at the Art Treasures Exhibition. The painting is now in the Guildhall Art Gallery in the City of London, having been acquired in 1904.

== Bibliography ==
- Murray, Peter. Daniel Maclise, 1806-1870: Romancing the Past. University of Michigan, 2008.
- Weston, Nancy. Daniel Maclise: Irish Artist in Victorian London. Four Courts Press, 2001.
