= 1840 in art =

Events from the year 1840 in art.

== Events ==
- March 4 – Alexander S. Wolcott and John Johnson open their "Daguerreian Parlor" on Broadway (Manhattan), the world's first commercial photography portrait studio.
- May 1 – Issue in the United Kingdom of the Penny Black, the world's first postage stamp, depicting the head of Queen Victoria engraved by Charles Heath and his son Frederick based on a sketch provided by Henry Corbould itself based on a cameo portrait by William Wyon, together with Mulready stationery. The stamp becomes valid for postage from May 6.
- September 30 – Foundation of Nelson's Column laid in London, Trafalgar Square being laid out and paved around it during the year.

== Works ==
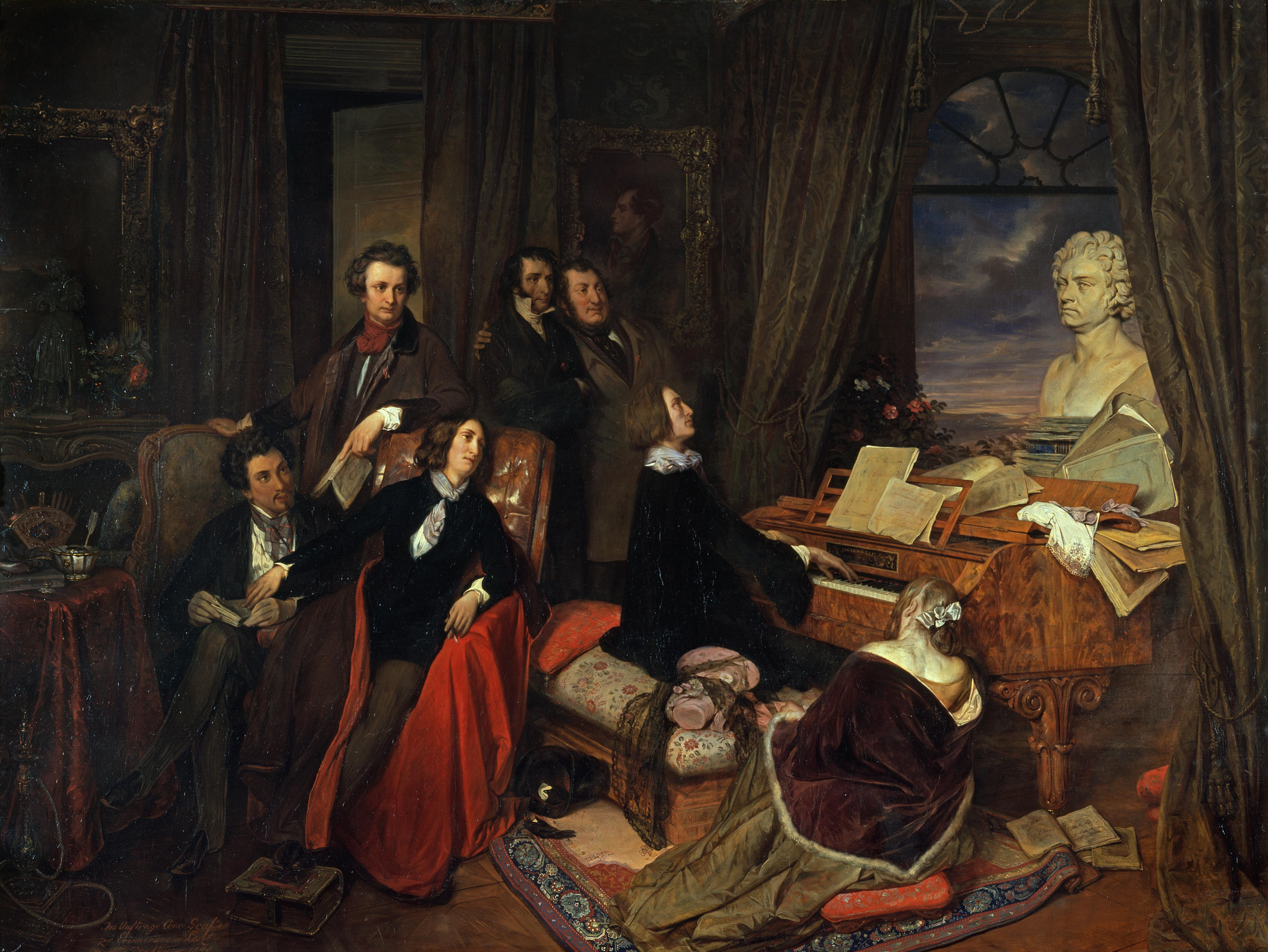
Liszt at the Piano by Josef Danhauser

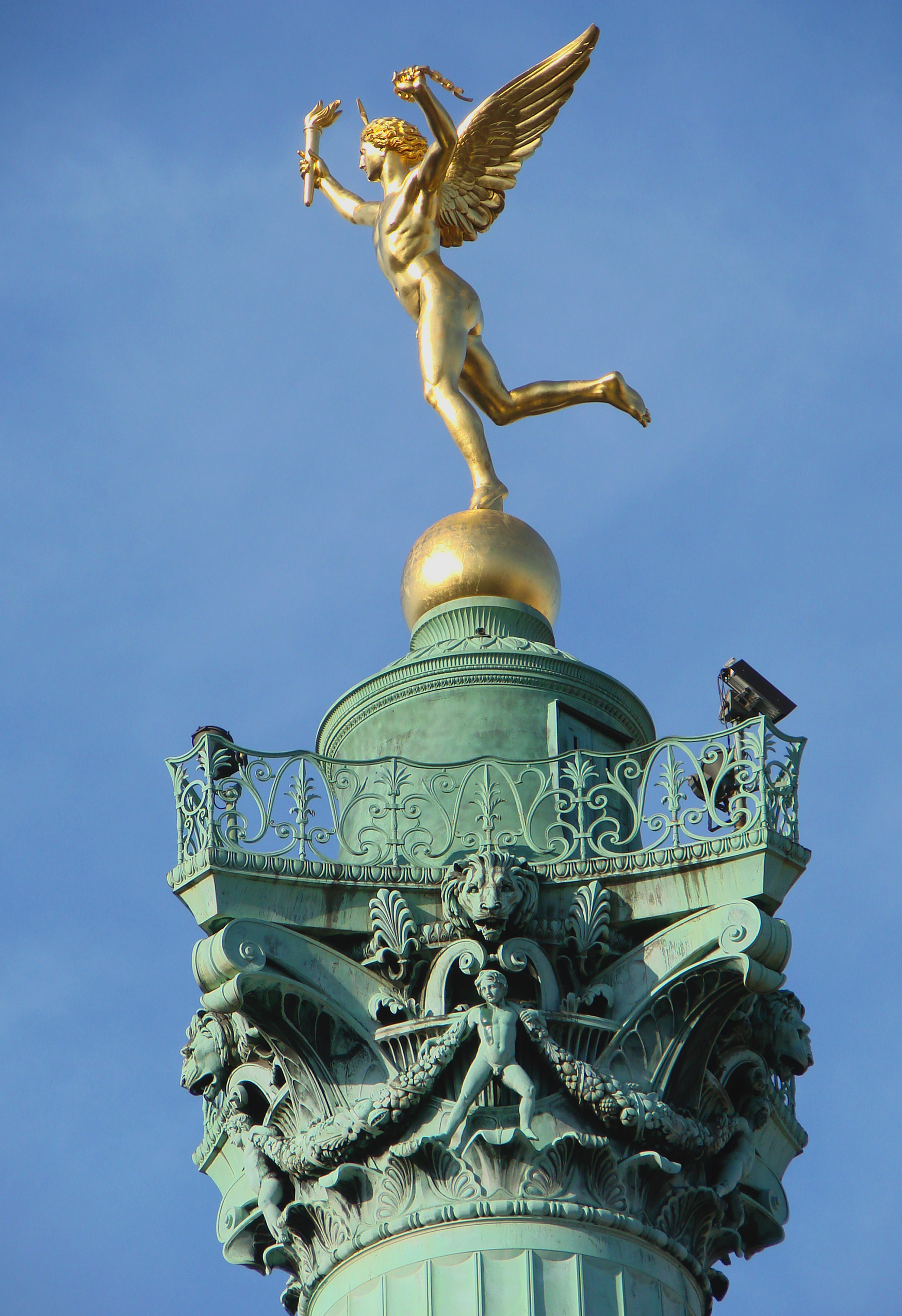
Génie de la Liberté on Colonne de Juillet

- Jean-Antoine Alavoine and Joseph-Louis Duc – July Column, Place de la Bastille, Paris; incorporating Auguste Dumont's Génie de la Liberté and bas-reliefs by Antoine-Louis Barye and others
- Thomas Jones Barker – The Bride of Death
- François Bouchot – Bonaparte at the Council of Five Hundred at Saint-Cloud
- John Gadsby Chapman -
  - The Baptism of Pocahontas
- Théodore Chassériau
  - Andromeda Chained to the Rock by the Nereids
  - Diana Surprised by Actaeon
  - Portrait of Dominique Lacordaire
- Francis Danby – The Deluge
- Josef Danhauser – Liszt at the Piano
- Eugène Delacroix (Musée du Louvre, Paris)
  - Entry of the Crusaders in Constantinople
  - The Shipwreck of Don Juan
- William Etty
  - Andromeda, Perseus Coming to Her Rescue
  - The Wrestlers (approximate date)
- Francis Grant – Queen Victoria Riding Out
- Horatio Greenough – George Washington (statue, Washington, D.C.)
- Benjamin Robert Haydon – The Duke of Wellington Describing the Field of Waterloo to George IV
- George Peter Alexander Healy – Portrait of Marshal Soult
- Samuel Jackson – View of the Avon at Hotwells
- Charles Landseer – Nell Gwynn at the Tavern
- Edwin Landseer – Laying Down The Law, or Trial by Jury (Chatsworth House, England)
- Robert Scott Lauder – Portrait of David Roberts
- William Linnell -Smugglerius
- Daniel Maclise
  - The Banquet Scene in Macbeth
  - Malvolio and the Countess
- John Martin – The Eve of the Deluge (British Royal Collection) and The Assuaging of the Waters (Fine Arts Museums of San Francisco)
- Andrew Morton – The Duke of Wellington with Colonel Gurwood at Apsley House
- Edward Villiers Rippingille – Mendicants of the Roman Campagna
- David Roberts
  - Portico of the Great Temple at Baalbec
  - A View in Cairo
- Richard Rothwell – Portrait of Mary Shelley
- John Christian Schetky – Loss of the Royal George
- Clarkson Stanfield – A View of Vietri in the Gulf of Salerno
- Armand Toussaint – Persephone (sculpture) (approx. date)
- J. M. W. Turner
  - The Slave Ship, or Slavers throwing overboard the Dead and Dying – Typhoon coming on (Museum of Fine Arts, Boston)
  - Venice, the Bridge of Sighs
  - Neapolitan Fisher Girls Surprised Bathing by Moonlight
- Horace Vernet
  - Judah and Tamar
  - The Siege of Antwerp
- Theodor von Holst – The Wish
- George Frederic Watts – The Ionides Family
- David Wilkie
  - Portrait of Abdülmecid I
  - Portrait of Queen Victoria
- Franz Xaver Winterhalter –
  - Portrait of the Duchess of Nemours
  - Portrait of Leopold I of Belgium

== Awards ==
- Grand Prix de Rome, painting:
- Grand Prix de Rome, sculpture:
- Grand Prix de Rome, architecture: Théodore Ballu
- Grand Prix de Rome, music: F.E.V. Bazin

== Births ==
- February 7 – Ida Göthilda Nilsson, Swedish sculptor (died 1920)
- March 10 – Charles Augustus Howell, Portuguese-British art dealer (died 1890)
- April 22 – Odilon Redon, French painter and graphic artist (died 1916)
- April 28 – Caroline Shawk Brooks, American sculptor (died 1913)
- May 2 – Philippe Solari, Provençal sculptor (died 1906)
- May 28 – Hans Makart, Austrian painter and designer (died 1884)
- July 8 – Heinrich von Angeli, Austrian society portrait painter (died 1925)
- August 14 – Briton Rivière, English painter (died 1920)
- September 27 – Thomas Nast, German American cartoonist (died 1902)
- November 12 – Auguste Rodin, French sculptor (died 1917)
- November 14 – Claude Monet, French Impressionist painter (died 1926)
- December 1 – Marie Bracquemond, née Quivoron, French Impressionist painter (died 1916)
- probable – Timothy H. O'Sullivan, Irish American photographer of the American Civil War (died 1882)

== Deaths ==
- January 16 – František Tkadlík, Czech painter (born 1786)
- February 9 – Luke Clennell, English engraver and painter (born 1781)
- February 27 – Henry Wyatt, English portrait painter (born 1794)
- March 19 – Thomas Daniell, landscape painter (born 1749)
- March 30 – Beau Brummell, leader of fashion (born 1778)
- April 7 – William Heath, English satirical engraver (born 1794)
- April 10 – Alexander Nasmyth, painter (born 1758)
- May 5 – Robert Trewick Bone English painter of sacred, classical and genre scenes (born 1790)
- May 7 – Caspar David Friedrich, painter (born 1774)
- May 11 – Eduard Joseph d'Alton, German engraver and naturalist (born 1772)
- June 20 – Pierre-Joseph Redouté, flower painter (born 1759)
- July 6 – Johann Heinrich Ramberg, German painter and printmaker (born 1763)
- July 23 – Carl Blechen, German painter, specializing in fantastic landscapes with demons and grotesque figures (born 1798)
- August 30 – Jonas Damelis, Lithuanian neoclassicist painter (born 1780)
- October 28 – Reverend John Thomson, minister of Duddingston Kirk near Edinburgh, and landscape painter (born 1778)
- November 7 – Pierre Petitot, French sculptor (born 1760)
- December 11 – Franz Bauer, Austrian microscopist and botanical artist (born 1758)
- date unknown
  - Moritz Fuerst, American engraver and medallist (born 1782)
  - Luigi Rados, Italian engraver (born 1773)
