= Ida Nilsson =

Ida Nilsson may refer to:

- Ida Nilsson (artist) (1840–1920), Swedish artist
- Ida Nilsson (runner) (born 1981), Swedish long-distance runner

== See also ==
- Ida Nilsen, Canadian musician
