= The Village Recruit =

Painting by David Wilkie

- Artist: David Wilkie
- Year: 1805
- Type: Oil on canvas, genre painting
- Dimensions: 64.1 cm × 76.8 cm (25.2 in × 30.2 in)
- Location: Private Collection

The Village Recruit is an 1805 genre painting by the Scottish artist David Wilkie. Painted at the time of the Napoleonic Wars it shows a recruiting party of the British Army in a country tavern where one young man has just enlisted and prepares to spend his King's shilling on further alcohol. It was painted when Wilkie was around twenty, the year he moved to London to study at the Royal Academy. It was one of three paintings that were spin-offs from his 1804 work Pitlessie Fair, which had featured a recruiting party. Influenced like much of Wilkie's work by the old masters of the seventeenth century, it has strong similarities to his better-known work The Village Politicians. It was initially known by the alternative title Bounty Money.

The work was not publicly exhibited in Willkie's lifetime. In the 1830s it was engraved as a print. A version of the painting is in the collection of the Fusilier Museum in Bury, Greater Manchester.

== See also ==
- The Recruiting Party, an 1822 painting by Edward Villiers Rippingille

== Bibliography ==
- Bayne, William. Sir David Wilkie, R. A. Walter Scott Publishing Company, 1903.
- Hichberger J.W.M. Images of the Army: The Military in British Art, 1815-1914. Manchester University Press, 2017.
- Tromans, Nicholas. David Wilkie: The People's Painter. Edinburgh University Press, 2007.
