= The Recruiting Party =

Painting by Edward Villiers Rippingille

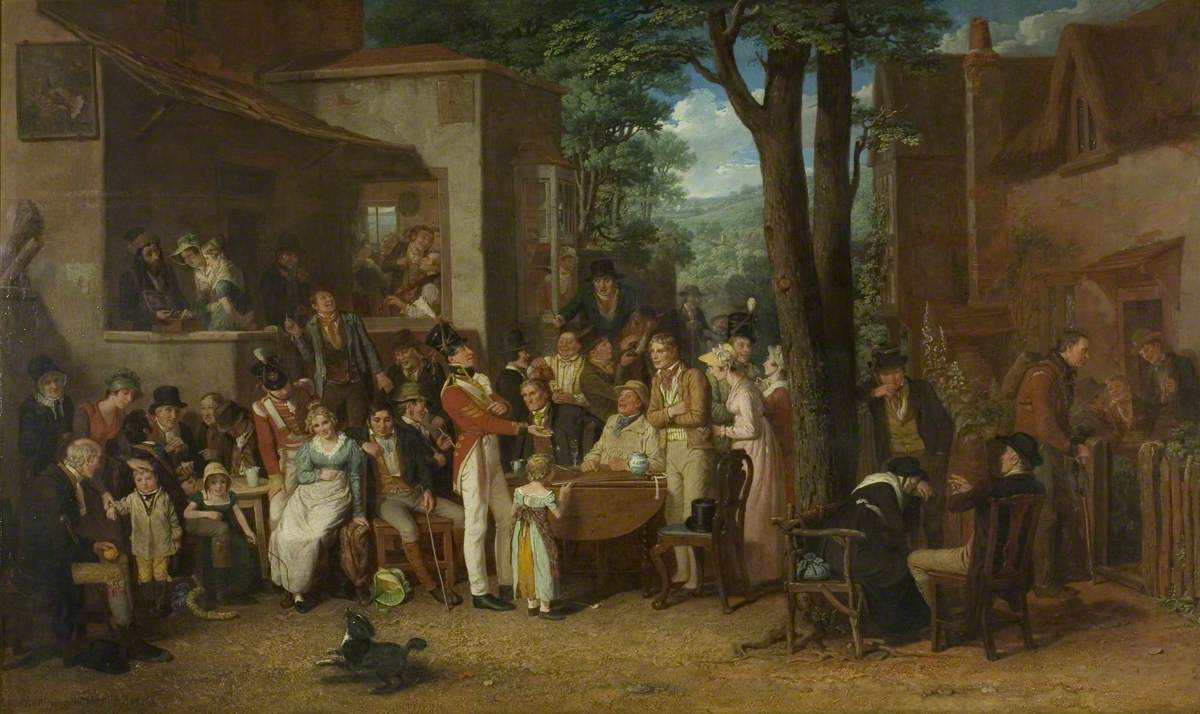
- Artist: Edward Villiers Rippingille
- Year: 1822
- Type: Oil on mahogany, genre painting
- Dimensions: 83.4 cm × 135.9 cm (32.8 in × 53.5 in)
- Location: City Museum and Art Gallery, Bristol

The Recruiting Party is an 1822 genre painting by the English artist Edward Villiers Rippingille. It portrays a British Army recruiting party outside on an English village green outside an inn. Although the scene appears to be a merry one, it conveys a warning about the underhand practices of recruiting sergeants who would trick drunken young men into taking the King's shilling.

It was shown at the Royal Academy Exhibition of 1822 at Somerset House in London, one of a number of genre paintings to attract interest along with David Wilkie's Chelsea Pensioners Reading the Waterloo Dispatch. One reviewer claims it featured "the best representations of English peasantry" we ever saw. Today it is in the collection of the Bristol City Museum and Art Gallery, having been acquired in 1917.

== See also ==
- The Village Recruit, an 1805 painting by David Wilkie

== Bibliography ==
- Hichberger J.W.M. Images of the Army: The Military in British Art, 1815-1914. Manchester University Press, 2017.
- Solkin, David H. Painting Out of the Ordinary: Modernity and the Art of Everyday Life in Early Nineteenth-century Britain. Yale University Press, 2009.
