= Jean Gautherin =

French sculptor

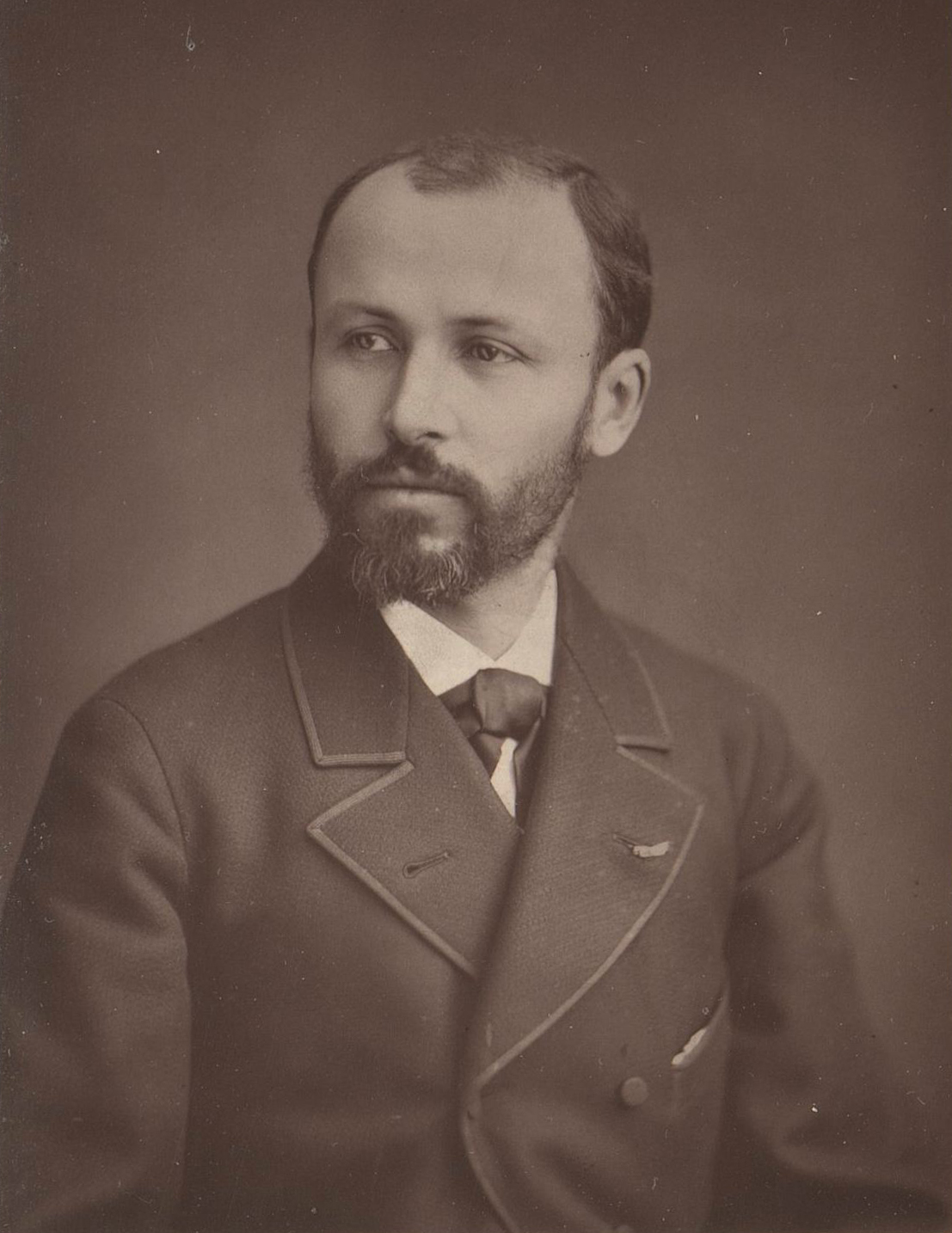
Ferdinand Mulnier, Portrait of Jean Gautherin, Woodburytype, Amsterdam, Rijksmuseum.

Jean Gautherin (28 December 1840 – 21 July 1890) was a French sculptor particularly known for his marble and bronze statues commissioned by the City of Paris.

Gautherin was born to a family of peasant farmers in Savault, a hamlet in the commune of Ouroux-en-Morvan. With the help of a local patron he studied in Paris, first at the Gobelins school for apprentices, followed by training in the atelier of Charles Gumery, and in 1864 he was admitted to the École des Beaux-Arts. The following year his work was accepted at the Paris Salon where he exhibited annually until his death, although after winning medals in the Salons of 1868, 1870, and 1873, he exhibited hors de concours (out of competition). His first major success came in 1876 with a marble sculpture of Saint Sebastien, which led to commissions from the City of Paris, and the cathedrals of Marseille and Nevers. He was made a Chevalier de la Légion d'honneur in 1878.

Gautherin died of a sudden illness in Paris at the age of 49, survived by his wife Anne-Marie (née Loué), whom he had married in 1883, and their three young children. Following his funeral at the Église Notre-Dame-des-Champs, he was buried in Montparnasse Cemetery.

== Selected works ==
- Grave of Simon Marx (1865), Cimetière du Père-Lachaise, Paris.
- Saint Sébastien (1876), Musée d'Orsay, Paris.
- Clotilde de Surville (1878), Musée d'Orsay, Paris.
- Le Ville de Paris (1881), Hôtel de Ville, Paris. An allegorical figure of the City of Paris.
- Le Paradis Perdu (Paradise Lost) (1883), Mairie of the 5th arrondissement, Paris. This sculpture of Adam and Eve was originally situated in the Parc Monceau. A copy is in the Ny Carlsberg Glyptotek in Copenhagen.
- Diderot (1884), Boulevard Saint-Germain, Paris.
- Marguerite (c. 1886). A life-sized copy after Gautherin's statuette was modeled in 1911 for the Lanning Fountain at Smith College in Northampton, Massachusetts.
- Maria Fedorovna, Empress-Consort of Russia (1889).
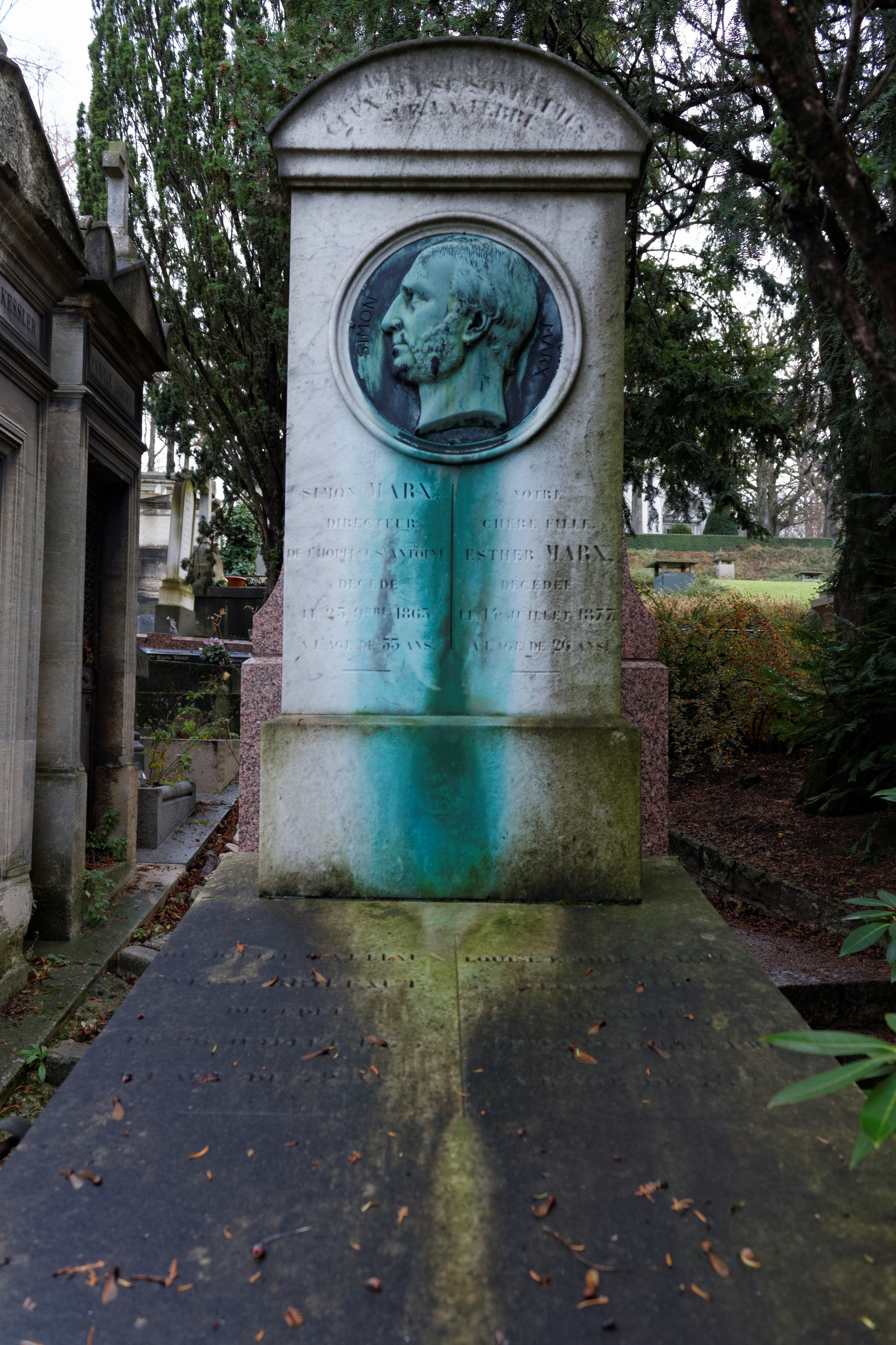
Grave of Simon Marx (1865), Cimetière du Père-Lachaise, Paris.

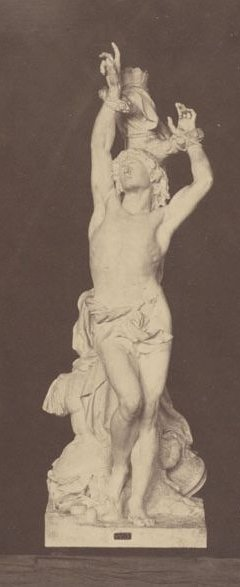
Saint Sébastien (1876), église Saint-Antoine, Compiègne.

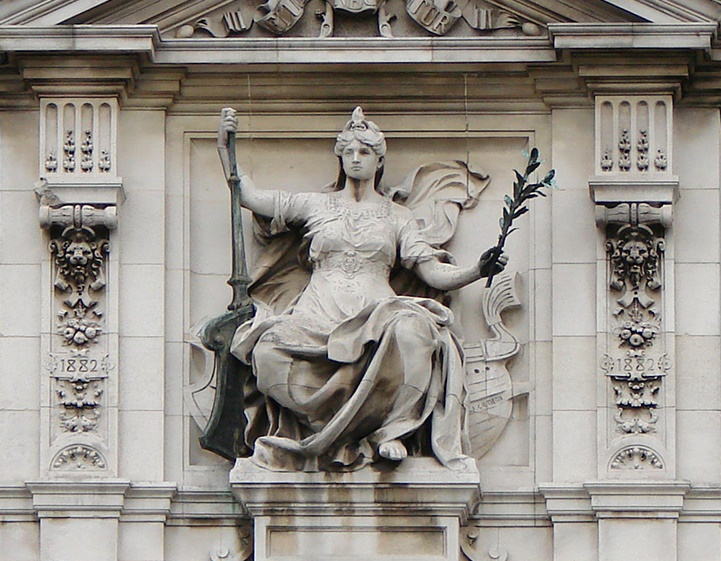
La Ville de Paris (The City of Paris) (1881), sculpture above the monumental clock of the Hôtel de Ville de Paris.

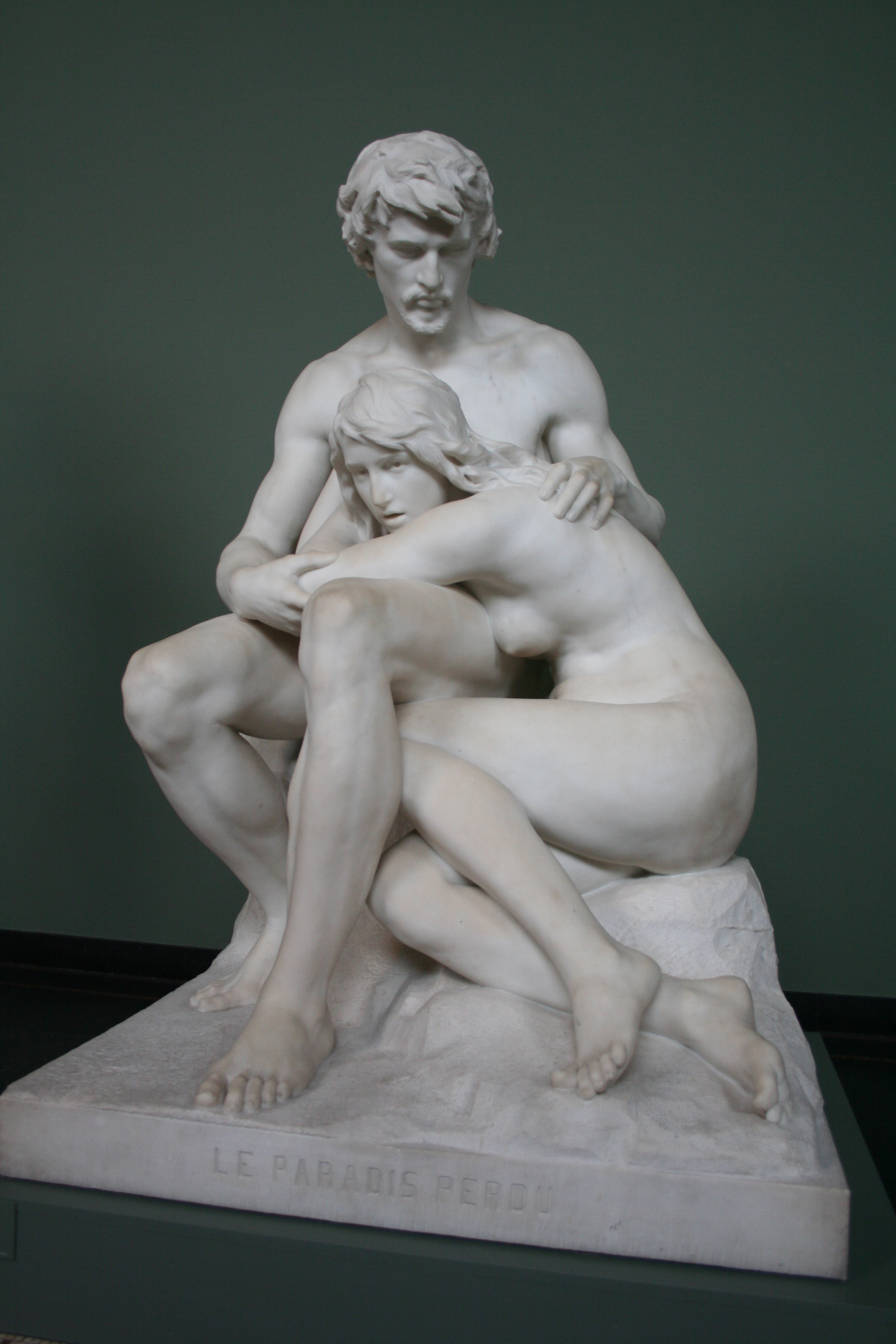
Le Paradis Perdu (Paradise Lost), 1883, Ny Carlsberg Glyptotek,

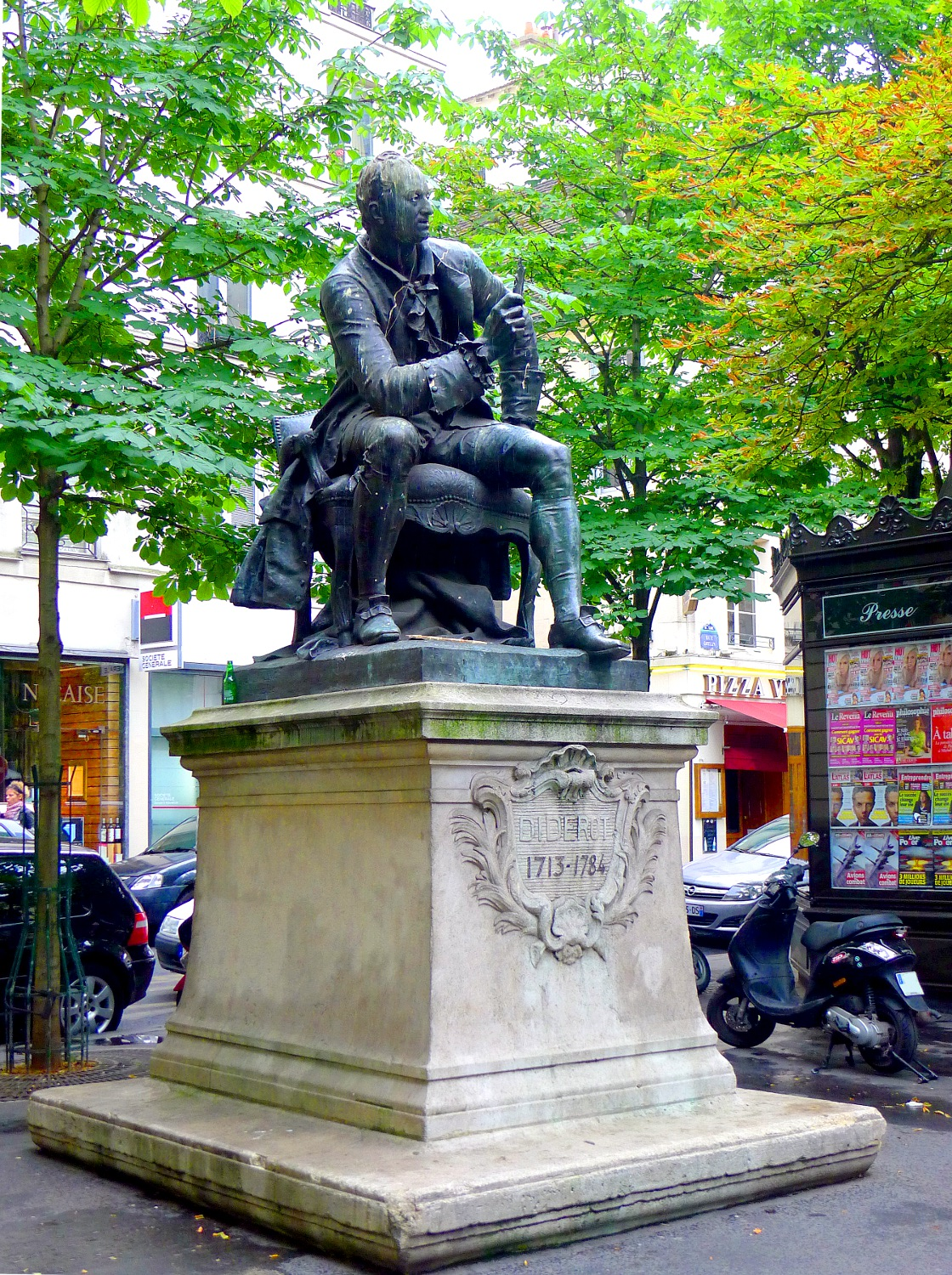
Diderot (1884), Boulevard Saint-Germain, Paris.

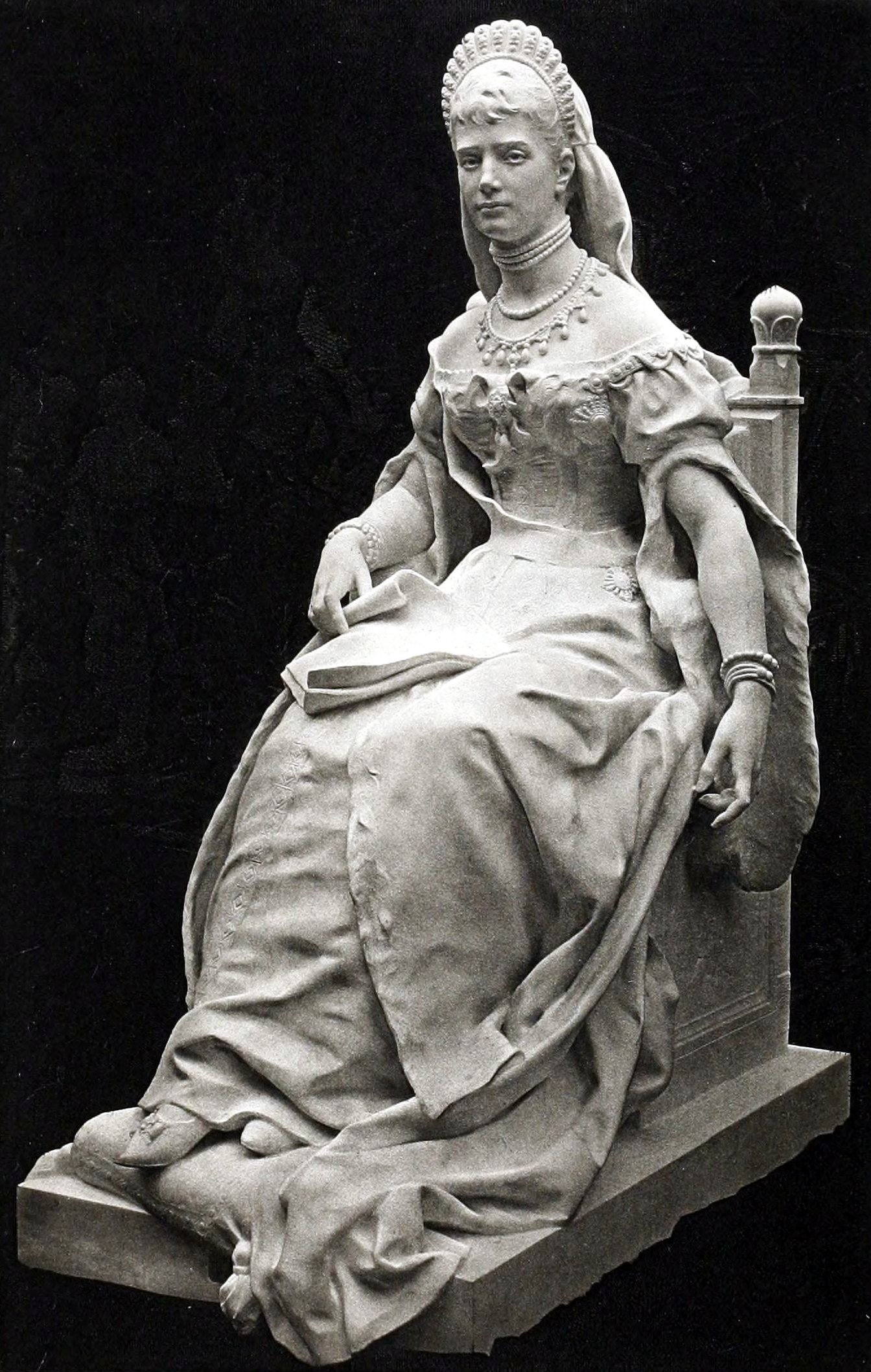
Maria Fedorovna, Empress-Consort of Russia (1889), Ny Carlsberg Glyptotek.
