= Charles Gumery =

French sculptor

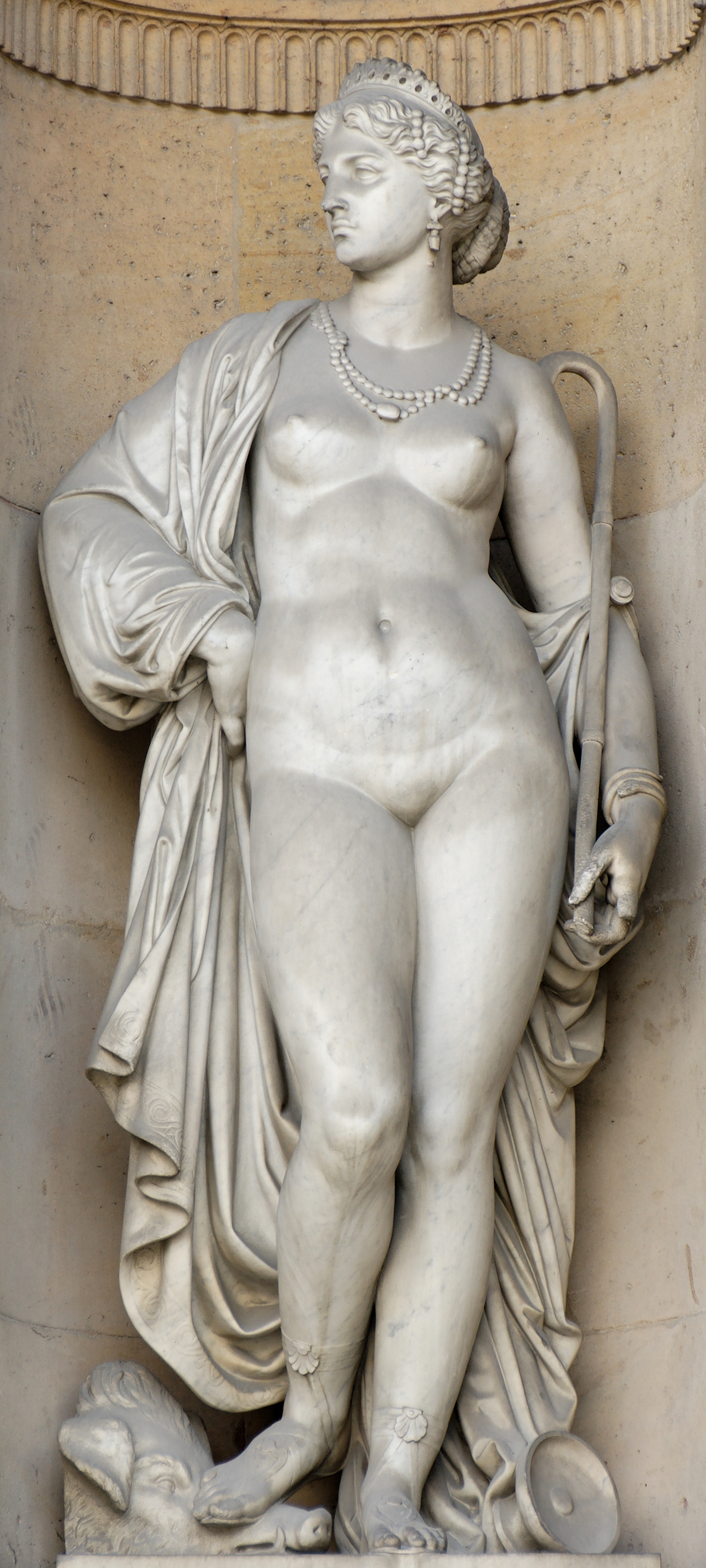
Circe, Cour Carrée of the Louvre, 1860

Charles-Alphonse-Achille Guméry (14 June 1827 – 19 January 1871) was a French sculptor working in an academic realist manner in Paris. Several of his figures ornament the Opéra Garnier most notoriously the group La Danse, which was commissioned from him after the group by Jean-Baptiste Carpeaux was found unacceptable.

Though he was born in the quartier of Vaugirard in Paris, Charles Guméry was from a middle-class Savoyard family established by his father at Passy.His father, Nicolas Guméry, was a schoolteacher.

A student of Armand Toussaint (1806–1862) at the École des Beaux-Arts in Paris, in 1850 he received the Prix de Rome, the sine qua non for an official career as a French sculptor. He became a prominent sculptor of the Second Empire, who was awarded the Legion d'Honneur, 29 June 1867.

When, on the morning of 29 August 1869 it was discovered that ink had been thrown over Jean-Baptiste Carpeaux' marble La Danse in the façade of the Opéra Garnier, it was thought to have been a scandalized gesture by a member of the public because of the nudity of Carpeaux' figures. Charles Garnier, who had already commissioned from Gumery two gilded groups for the cornice of the Palais Garnier, asked Gumery to sculpt a replacement figure of La Danse to replace the disfigured Carpeaux group. With the Franco-Prussian War of the following year, followed by the Paris Commune, during which Gumery died in Paris under obscure circumstances during the privations of the Siege of Paris, when many starved, and then the death of Carpeaux in 1875, the scandal was forgotten: the Carpeaux group remained in place and Gumery's La Danse is conserved in the Musée des Beaux-Arts d'Angers.

Gumery is buried in the Cimetière de Montmartre, where his gravestone is surmounted by a bust sculpted by his pupil Jean Gautherin.

== Selected works ==
His work in Paris includes :

- the gilded figural groups L'Harmonie and La Poésie crowning the end pavilions of the Palais Garnier
- Circe on the south façade of the Cour Carrée in the Louvre palace, 1860
- the figure of Amsterdam at the Gare du Nord, circa 1846
- the figure of Temperance in the Fontaine Saint-Michel, 1858–60

== Gallery ==
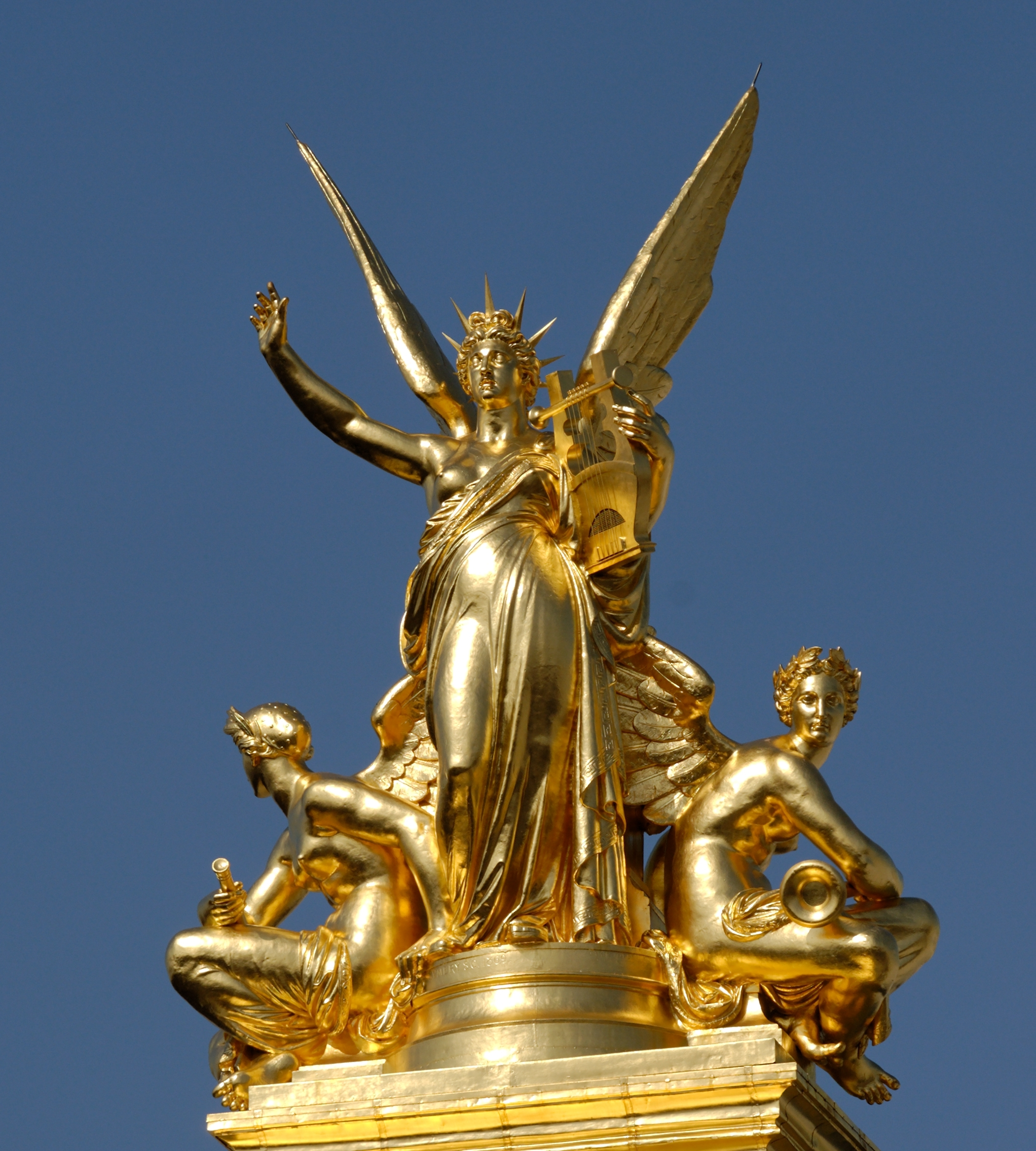
L'Harmonie (1869), Opéra Garnier. 7.5 metres (25 ft) gilt copper electrotype.

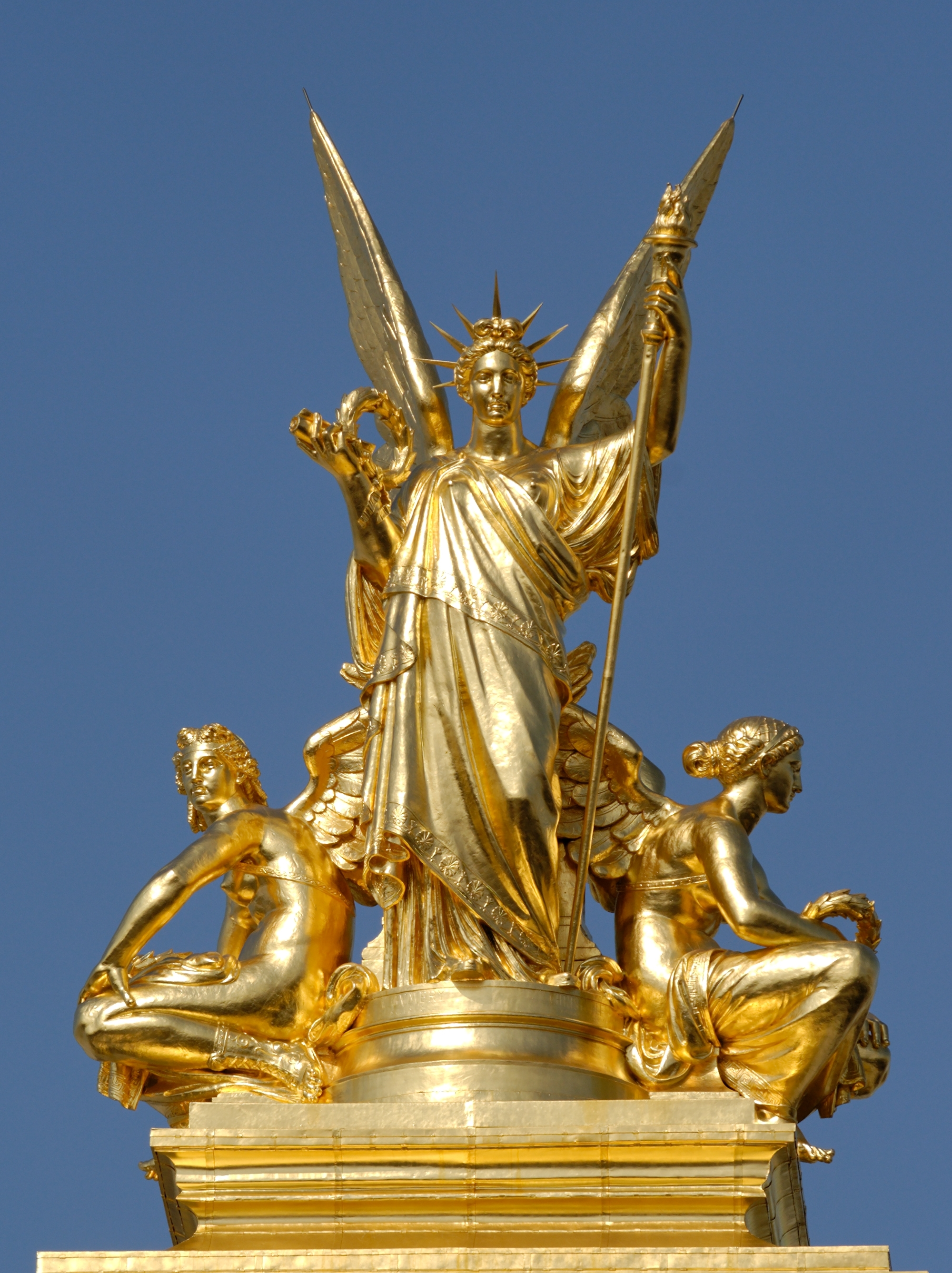
La Poésie

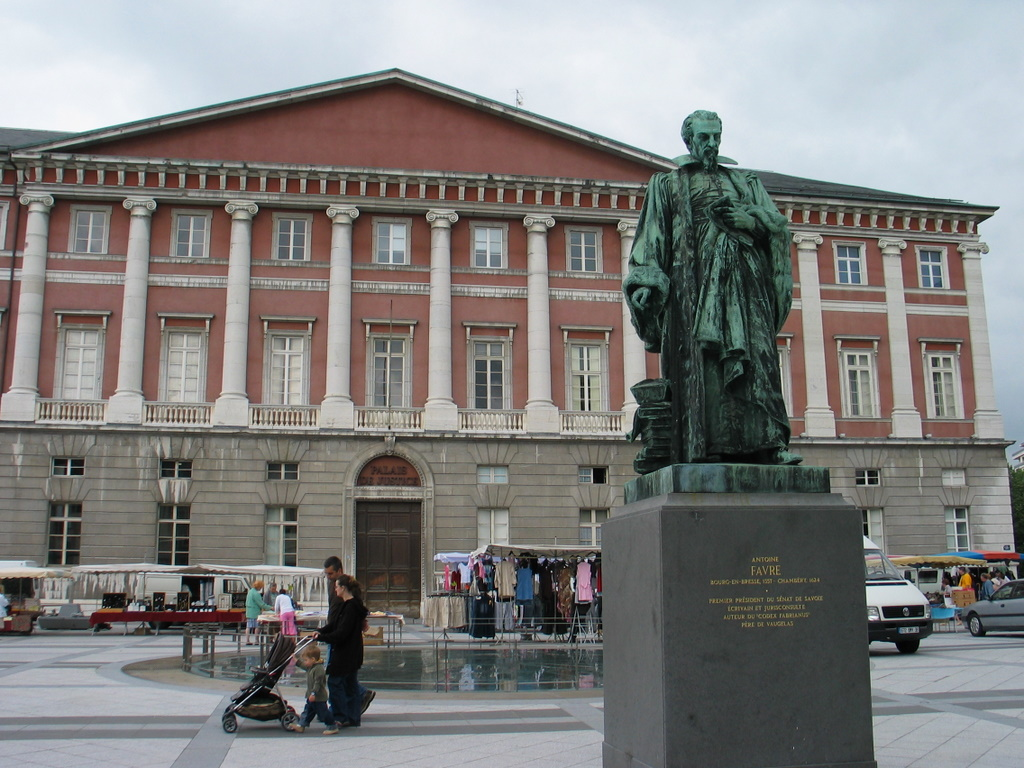
Antoine Favre
