= Richard Rothwell (painter) =

Irish painter

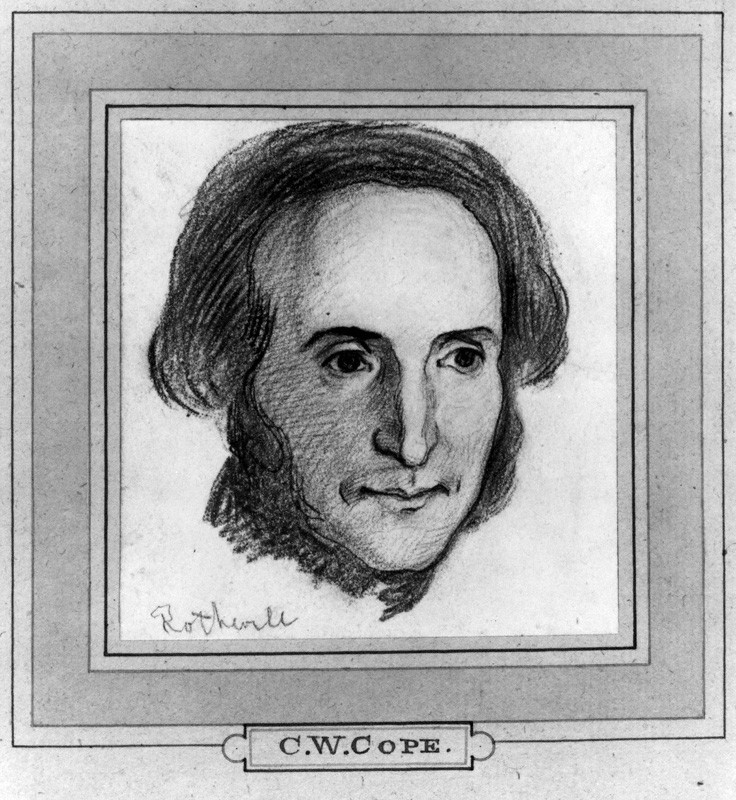
Pen and ink drawing by Charles West Cope of Richard Rothwell circa 1862.

Richard Rothwell (20 November 1800 – 13 September 1868) was an Irish painter who specialised in portrait painting.

== Biography ==
Richard Rothwell was born 20 November 1800 in Dublin. His father has generally been stated to be James Rothwell of Lisdaly, near Cloghen, King's Co. (Offaly), though primary source evidence suggests that he was the son of William Rothwell, gentleman, who appears in the 1820s as a publican of Ferbane, King’s Co., acquiring land at Ballicknahee, King’s Co. His mother was Elizabeth Rothwell (née Holmes). He had at least three siblings (a brother and two sisters) and possibly as many as six [3]. He trained to become a painter at the Dublin Society's school from 1814 until 1820 and won a silver medal for his work. At the age of 24, he was made a member of the newly established Royal Hibernian Academy and exhibited portraits there from 1826 to 1829. He subsequently moved to London and worked as a studio assistant to Thomas Lawrence,. When Lawrence died in 1830, Rothwell completed many of his unfinished works and was poised to become the next foremost portrait painter in Britain and Ireland. According to Leoneé Ormond's biographical article in the Grove Dictionary of Art, Rothwell "was at the height of his powers from 1829 to 1831"; he "was much influenced by Lawrence, but he lacked the incisiveness and flair of his master". From 1831 to 1834, Rothwell toured Italy to study Italian art so that he could paint history paintings. When he returned to London, his popularity had evaporated. Rothwell lived and exhibited works in Ireland, the United States, London, and Italy, but he never again achieved the same level of popularity he had reached in the late 1820s.

In 1842 Rothwell married Rosa Marshall; the couple had several children.

In 1868, Rothwell contracted a fever while working in Rome and died. Joseph Severn, who painted a portrait of the Romantic poet John Keats, arranged for Rothwell's funeral and tomb in the Protestant Cemetery, Rome.

== Work ==
According to Fintan Cullen's biographical entry in the Oxford Dictionary of National Biography, Rothwell's "portraits are highly accomplished" and "fine examples" include those of novelist Gerald Griffin and Mary Shelley. In the 1830s, he started painting genre pictures, such as The Poor Mendicants (1837). Rothwell usually painted Italian-inspired pieces, such as his semi-nude study Calisto (c. 1850s), a work he considered his masterpiece. He was furious when the painting was poorly hung at the 1862 International Exhibition in London and published a pamphlet on the topic.

=== Examples of his work ===
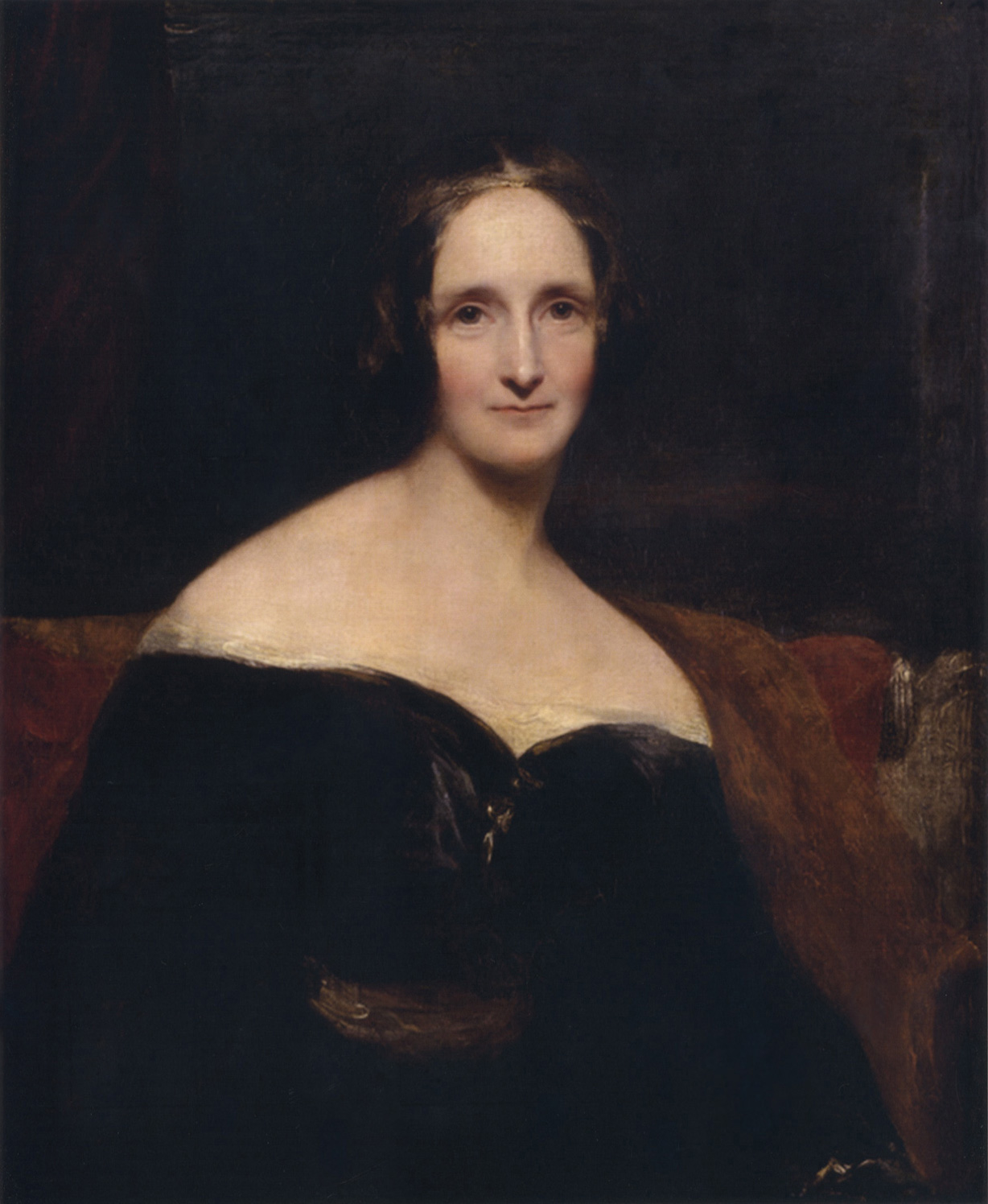
Portrait of Mary Shelley (1840)

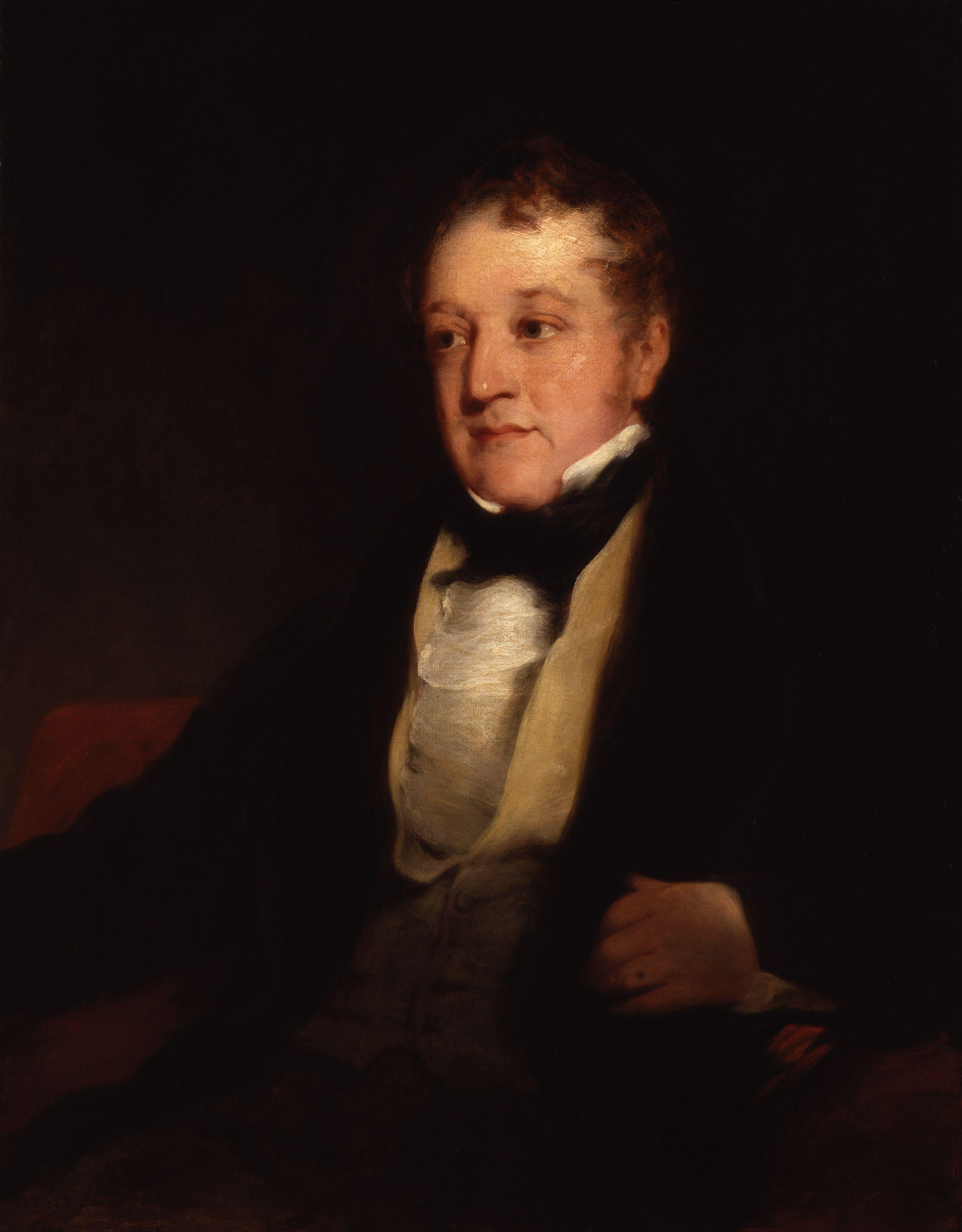
William Huskisson (1831)

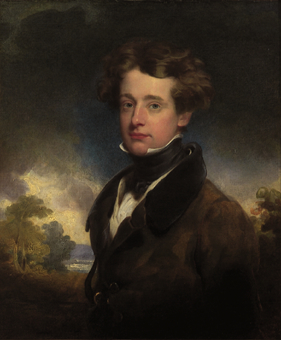
Portrait of a young man

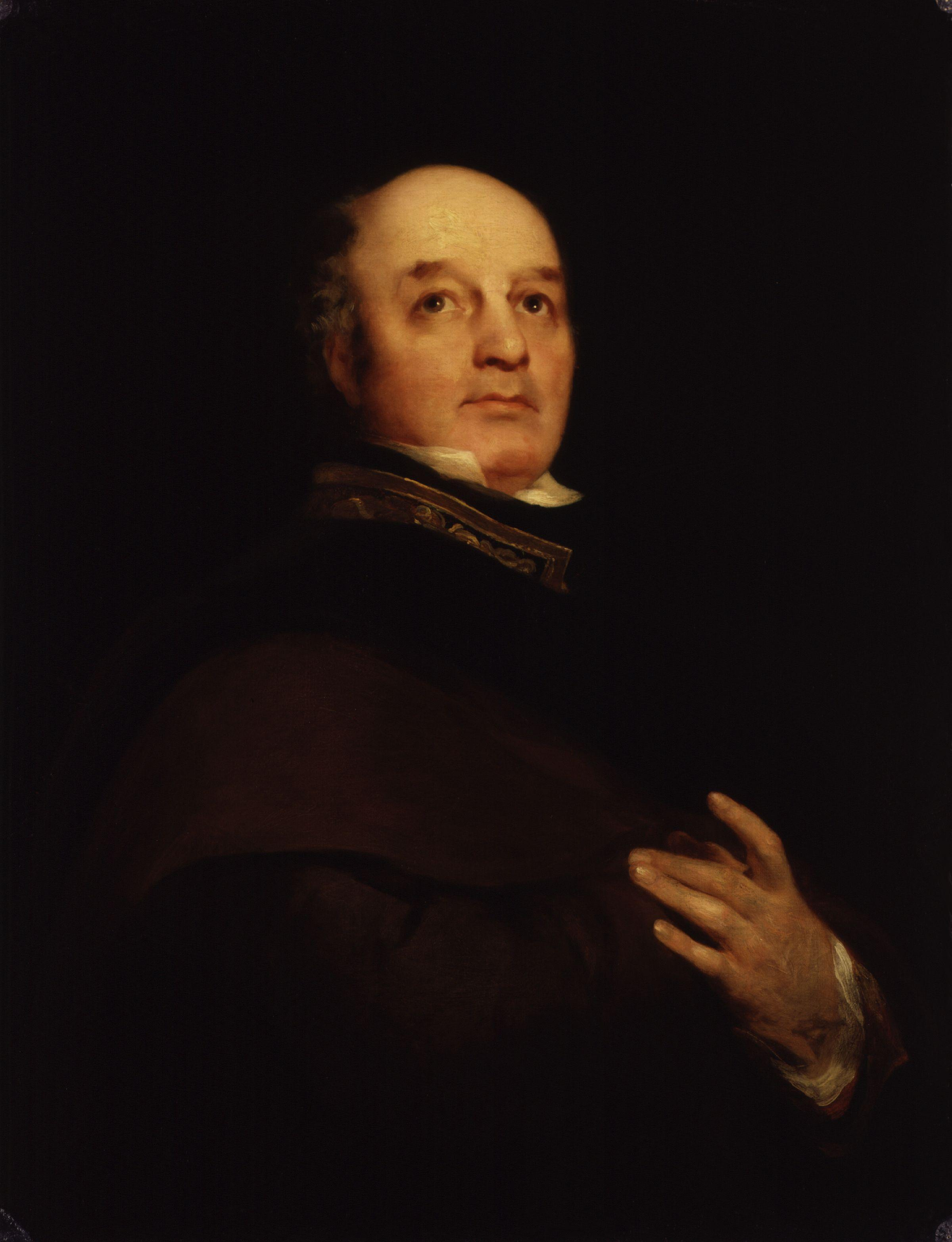
Lord Beresford, 1831

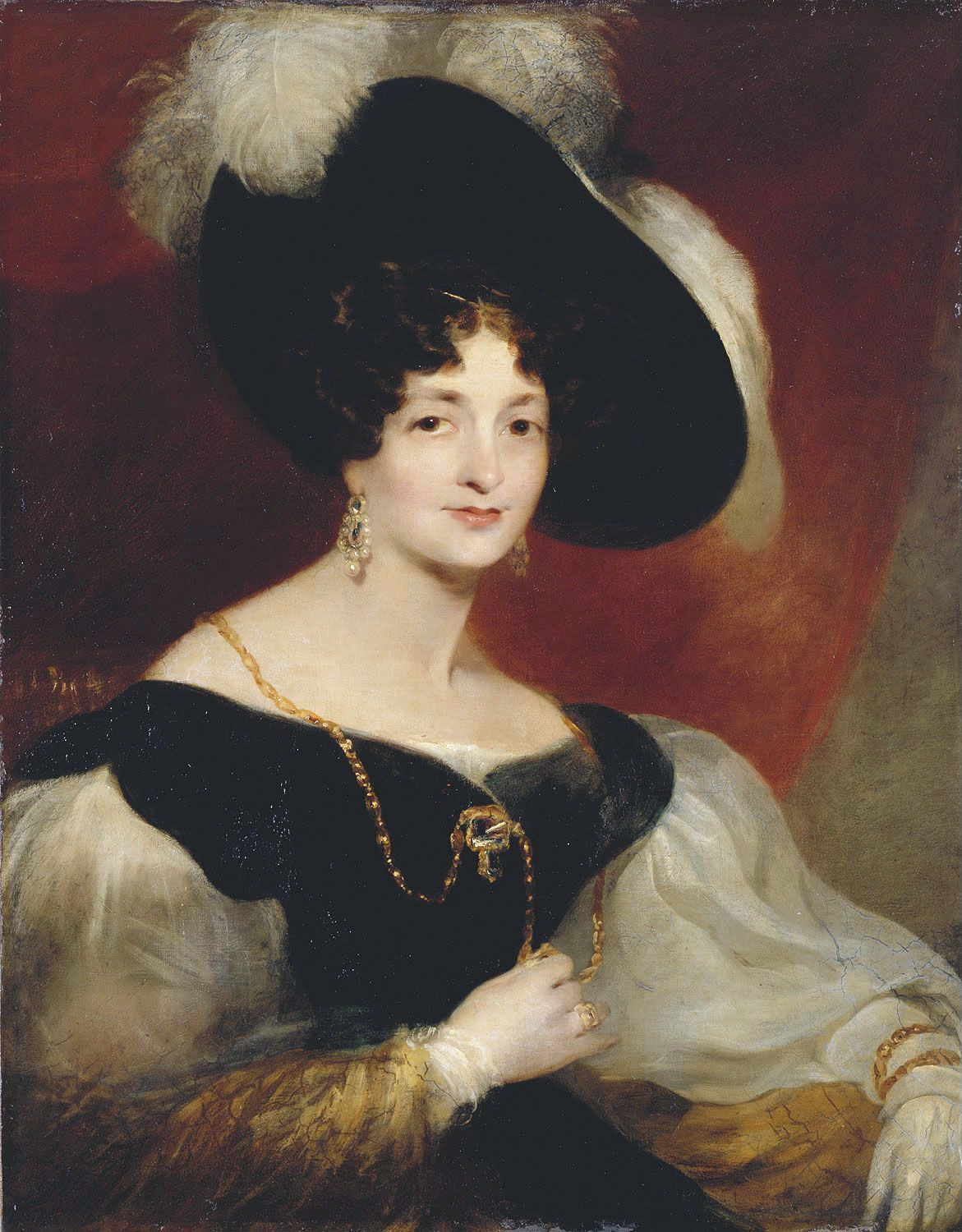
Victoria, Duchess of Kent, 1832

== Notes ==
3. Devine, Ruth. "Rothwell, Richard". The Dictionary of Irish Biography.

== Bibliography ==
- Cullen, Fintan. "Richard Rothwell". Oxford Dictionary of National Biography. Retrieved on 19 April 2008.
- Ormond, Lenoeé. "Richard Rothwell". Grove Dictionary of Art. Retrieved on 24 April 2008.

Devine, Ruth. "Rothwell, Richard". The Dictionary of Irish Biography. revised 2022.
