= Mendicants of the Roman Campagna =

Painting by Edward Villiers Rippingille

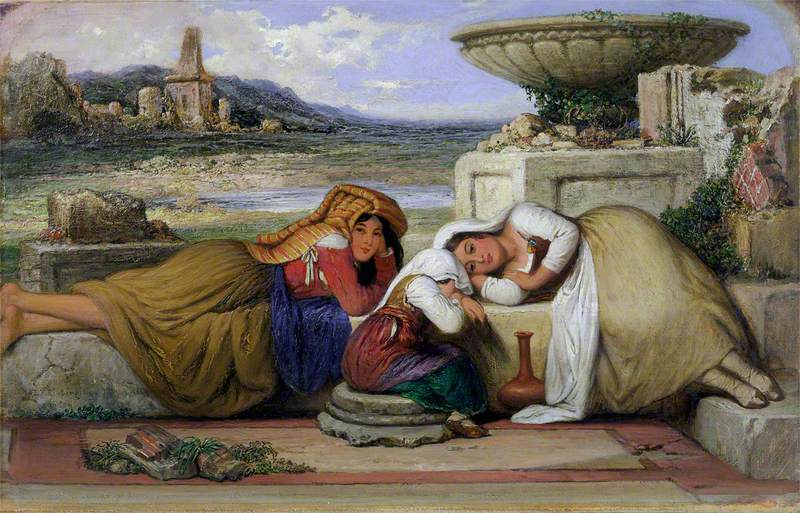
- Artist: Edward Villiers Rippingille
- Year: 1840
- Type: Oil on canvas, genre painting
- Dimensions: 36.8 cm × 57.3 cm (14.5 in × 22.6 in)
- Location: Victoria and Albert Museum, London

Mendicants of the Roman Campagna is an 1840 genre painting by the English artist Edward Villiers Rippingille. The oil on canvas depicts two women and a child, beggars or mendicants, reclining amid classical ruins in the Roman Campagna, the countryside surrounding Rome in Lazio. The painting is signed and dated on a stone at lower left, "E V Rippingille ROMA 1840 / London 1844". It is held by the Victoria and Albert Museum in South Kensington, London, where it is displayed in the British Galleries.

== Background ==
Rippingille was an oil painter and watercolourist who was a prominent member of the Bristol School, an informal group of artists active in Bristol during the early nineteenth century. In Bristol he was closely associated with Edward Bird and Francis Danby, and made his name with genre scenes of everyday life such as The Stage-Coach Breakfast (1824). After moving to London in 1832, Rippingille travelled extensively in France, Germany, and Italy. In 1836 he sold his series of six paintings The Progress of Intemperance to the Walker Art Gallery in Liverpool for £300, and the following year he departed for Italy. After stays in Paris and Florence, he arrived in Rome at Christmas 1837 during a cholera epidemic and may have remained there until 1841, producing paintings in the picturesque Italian style exemplified by this work.

Italy had long been recognised as a rich source of subject matter for paintings, and oil paintings depicting the Italian and Swiss countryside grew in popularity during the first half of the nineteenth century, appealing particularly to collectors such as John Sheepshanks and the Reverend Chauncey Hare Townshend. Italian beggars of the Roman Campagna were a favoured subject among British artists, who found the figures picturesque, especially when young and female. Their colourful costumes and the beauty of the Italian landscape made an attractive combination, though the harsher realities of rural poverty were typically left unshown.

== Exhibition and provenance ==
Rippingille exhibited the painting at the Royal Academy's seventy-sixth annual Summer Exhibition in 1844, held at the National Gallery building on Trafalgar Square between 6 May and 27 July. The same exhibition featured J. M. W. Turner's Rain, Steam and Speed – The Great Western Railway. According to a note on the reverse of the canvas, Rippingille was furious to discover that the organisers had hung the painting virtually at floor level, where the public were unlikely to notice it. Nevertheless, the collector John Sheepshanks saw the work and purchased it directly from the artist.

Sheepshanks (1787–1863) was a wealthy Yorkshire cloth manufacturer and one of the foremost collectors of contemporary British art. In 1857 he donated 233 paintings and a similar number of drawings to the South Kensington Museum (later renamed the Victoria and Albert Museum) with the aim of founding a national gallery of British art. Mendicants of the Roman Campagna entered the museum's collection as part of this Sheepshanks Gift, and bears the accession number FA.173[O].

== Bibliography ==
- Greenacre, Francis (1973). The Bristol School of Artists: Francis Danby and Painting in Bristol, 1810–1840. Bristol: City Art Gallery.
- Lambourne, Lionel (1982). An Introduction to "Victorian" Genre Painting: From Wilkie to Frith. London: Victoria and Albert Museum.
- Parkinson, Ronald (1990). Catalogue of British Oil Paintings 1820–1860. London: HMSO.
- Roe, Sonia (2008). Oil Paintings in Public Ownership in the Victoria and Albert Museum. London: Public Catalogue Foundation.
