= Persephone (sculpture) =

Sculpture by Armand Toussaint

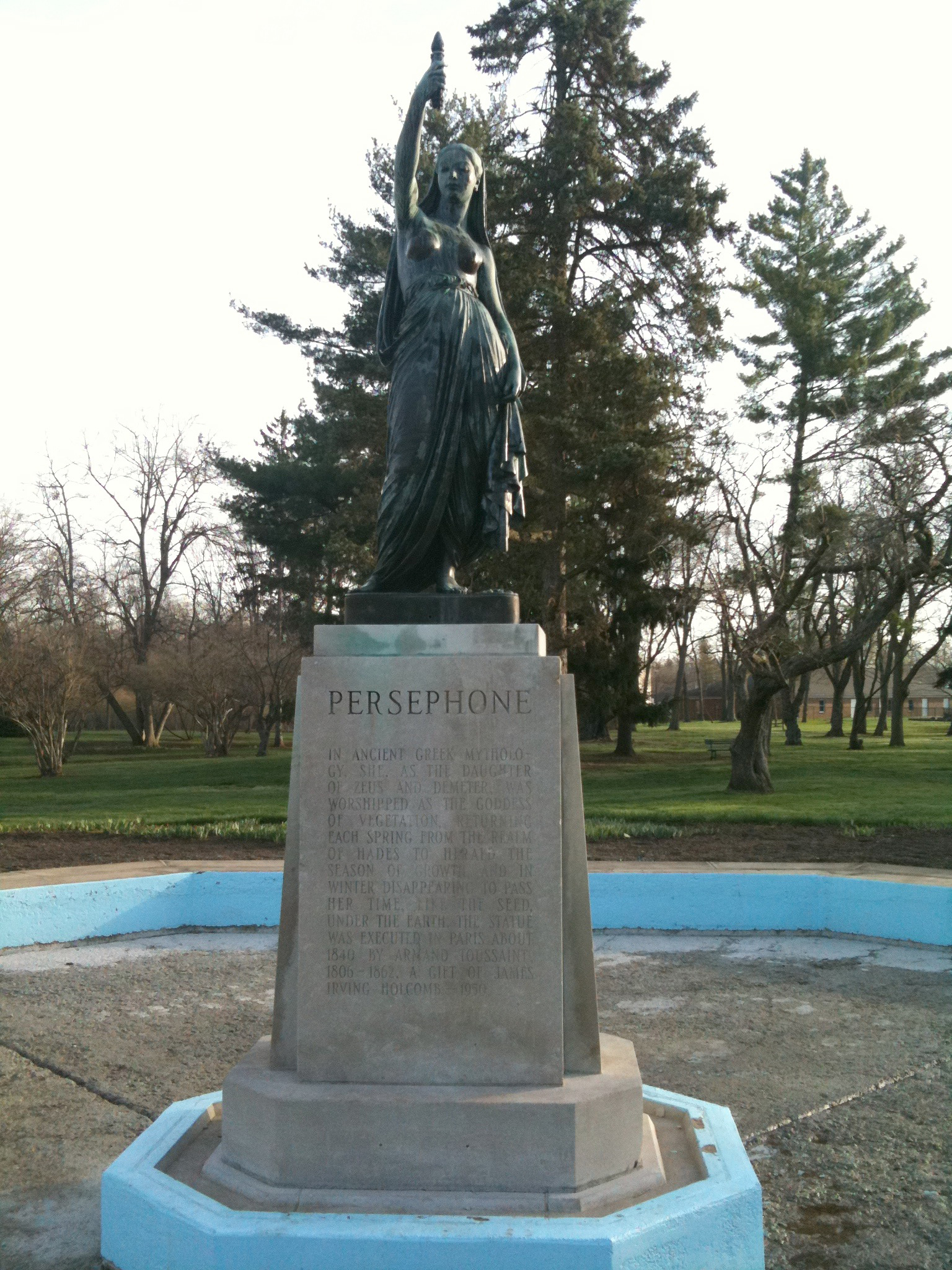
- Artist: Armand Toussaint
- Year: ca. 1840
- Type: Bronze
- Dimensions: 160 cm × 56 cm × 41 cm (63 in × 22 in × 16 in)
- Location: Butler University, Indianapolis, Indiana, United States; 39.845301°N 86.169994°W
- Owner: Butler University

Persephone is an outdoor sculpture by artist Armand Toussaint created c. 1840. The work sits within the center of a pool in Holcomb Gardens on the grounds of Butler University in Indianapolis, Indiana, United States. The sculpture depicts the Greek goddess Persephone. In 1993 the sculpture was examined by the Save Outdoor Sculpture! program produced by the Smithsonian Institution.

== Description ==
Persephone depicts the Greek goddess Persephone standing on a limestone base in the center of a concrete octagonal pool. The bronze female figure is draped from the waist down. Her left hand is raised and holds a lit torch of bundled twigs. An inscription on the statue base reads on the left statue base:

AD TOUSSAINT
SCULPTEUR

The right side of the base is inscribed:

GRAUX-MARLY
FABT DE BRONZES

The front of the base is inscribed just before a 1950 founders mark:

PERSEPHONE
IN ANCIENT GREEK MYTHOLO-
GY, SHE, AS THE DAUGHTER
OF ZEUS AND DEMETER, WAS
WORSHIPPED AS THE GODDESS
OF VEGETATION, RETURNING
EACH SPRING FROM THE REALM
OF HADES TO HERALD THE
SEASON OF GROWTH, AND IN
WINTER DISAPPEARING TO PASS
HER TIME, LIKE THE SEED,
UNDER THE EARTH. THE STATUE
WAS EXECUTED IN PARIS ABOUT
1840 BY ARMAND TOUSSAINT,
1806-1862. A GIFT OF JAMES
IRVING HOLCOMB

== Acquisition ==
The sculpture was made in France and was originally located at the Swift estate in Chicago, Illinois. It was purchased by J. I. Holcomb in 1950 and installed at the gardens.

== Creation ==
The piece was primarily crafted by sculptor Armand Toussaint and cast by Graux-Marly. J.I. Holcomb and Arthur Lindberg were the landscape architects for its placement at Holcomb Gardens.

== Condition ==
In 1993 Persephone was surveyed for the Save Outdoor Sculpture! survey on behalf of the Smithsonian Institution. The condition of the sculpture, at that time, was described as "treatment needed."

== Information ==
The sculpture of the Greek goddess is meant to represent Persephone coming back from the underworld every spring to make the flowers and plants bloom. In Fall 2011 a mural in the Johnson Room in Robertson Hall on the Butler campus was created. The 2,120 square-foot mural depicts notable landmarks at Butler, including Persephone.

In 1962, students dressed the statue in a bra, referencing the infamous "I dreamed I... in my Maidenform bra" campaign.
