= Portrait of Mary Shelley =

Painting by Richard Rothwell

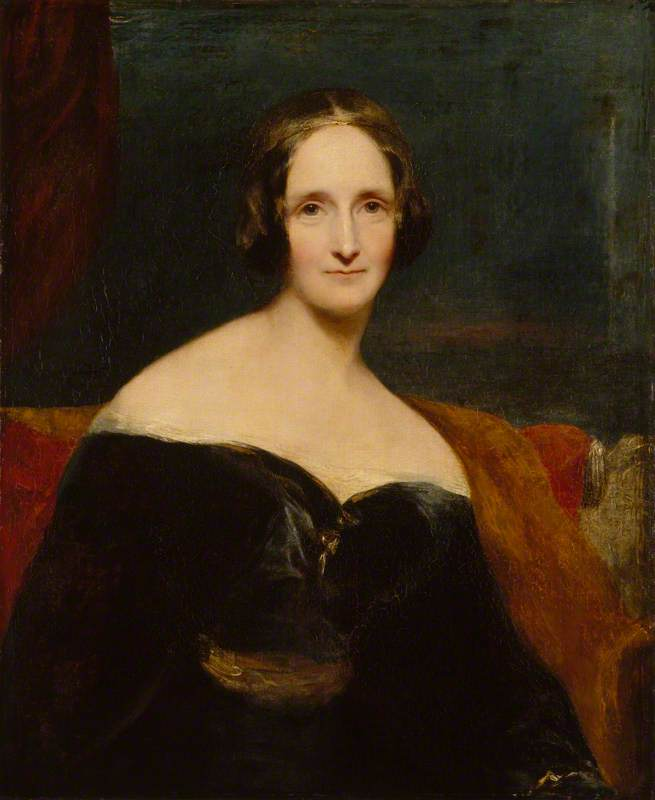
- Artist: Richard Rothwell
- Year: 1840
- Type: Oil on canvas, portrait painting
- Dimensions: 73.7 cm × 61 cm (29.0 in × 24 in)
- Location: National Portrait Gallery, London

Portrait of Mary Shelley is an 1840 portrait painting by the Irish artist Richard Rothwell. It depicts the British author Mary Shelley best known for writing the 1818 novel Frankenstein; or, The Modern Prometheus . The wife of the Romantic poet Percy Bysshe Shelley, who has drowned off the coast of Italy, in 1822 she returned to Britain and raised their son Percy Shelley, continuing to produce further novels.

Her views were often more conservative than those of her late husband or her father William Godwin. By the time the painting was completed she was a conventional member of early Victorian society although she continued to sympathise with liberal causes. She was a supporter of the Abolitionist movement. The painting was displayed at the Royal Academy Exhibition of 1840 held at the National Gallery in London and again at the Exhibition of National Portraits held in 1868. It is now in the collection of the National Portrait Gallery, having been bequeathed by Shelley's daughter-in-law in 1899.

== Bibliography ==
- Crane, David. Romantics & Revolutionaries: Regency Portraits from the National Portrait Gallery London. National Portrait Gallery, 2002.
- Holmes, Richard. The Romantic poets and Their Circle. National Portrait Gallery, 2005.
- Ormond, Richard. Early Victorian Portraits. University of California Press, 1974.
