= Armand Toussaint =

French sculptor

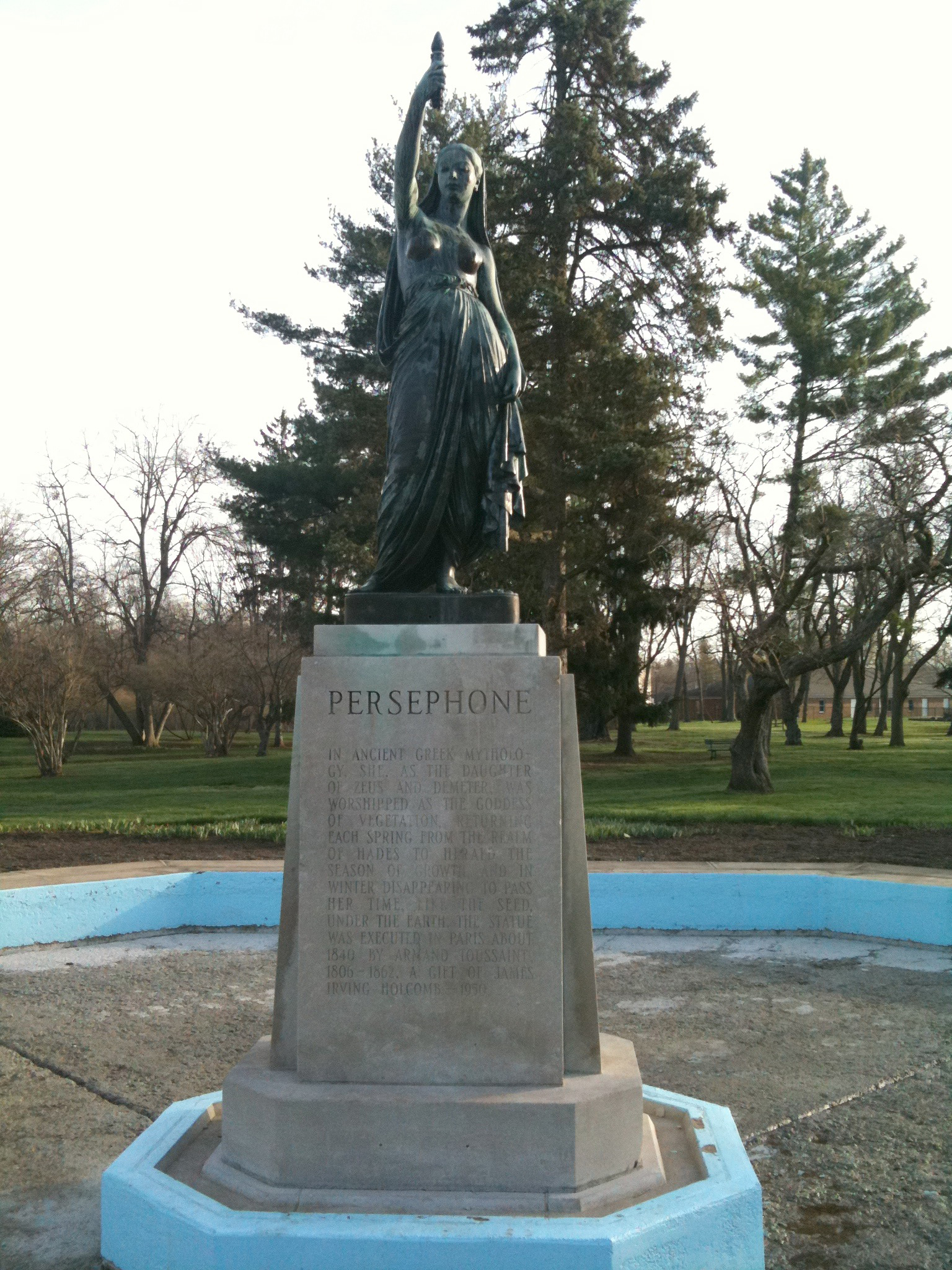
Persephone by Armand Toussaint (1840)

François Christophe Armand Toussaint (born 7 April 1806; died 24 May 1862) was a French sculptor who was native to Paris and made his career there.

The son of a locksmith, Armand Toussaint became interested in art, especially sculpture. At the age of 21, he entered the École des Beaux-Arts in 1827 and studied under David d'Angers. In 1832, he won the second Grand Prix de Rome for his Capanée foudroyé sous les murs de Thèbes.

He exhibited at the Salon between 1836 and 1850, winning a third-class medal in 1839 for his Jésus Christ environné de petits enfants and a second class in 1847 for his Une esclave indienne portant une torche.

As well as working on his own projects, Toussaint was professor of sculpture at the École des Beaux Arts. In addition to teaching art students and apprentices, he carried out several official and church commissions. Around 1850 he was included among those working in Notre Dame de Paris to restore sculptures destroyed during the French Revolution. In 1852, he was made a Knight of the Legion of Honor.

He is buried in the cemetery of Montmartre. On his tomb is a bronze medallion by his former student Charles Gumery.

A well known work of his in the United States is the statue of Persephone, located in Indianapolis. It was created around 1840.
