= The Wrestlers (Etty) =

c. 1840 painting of two wrestlers by William Etty

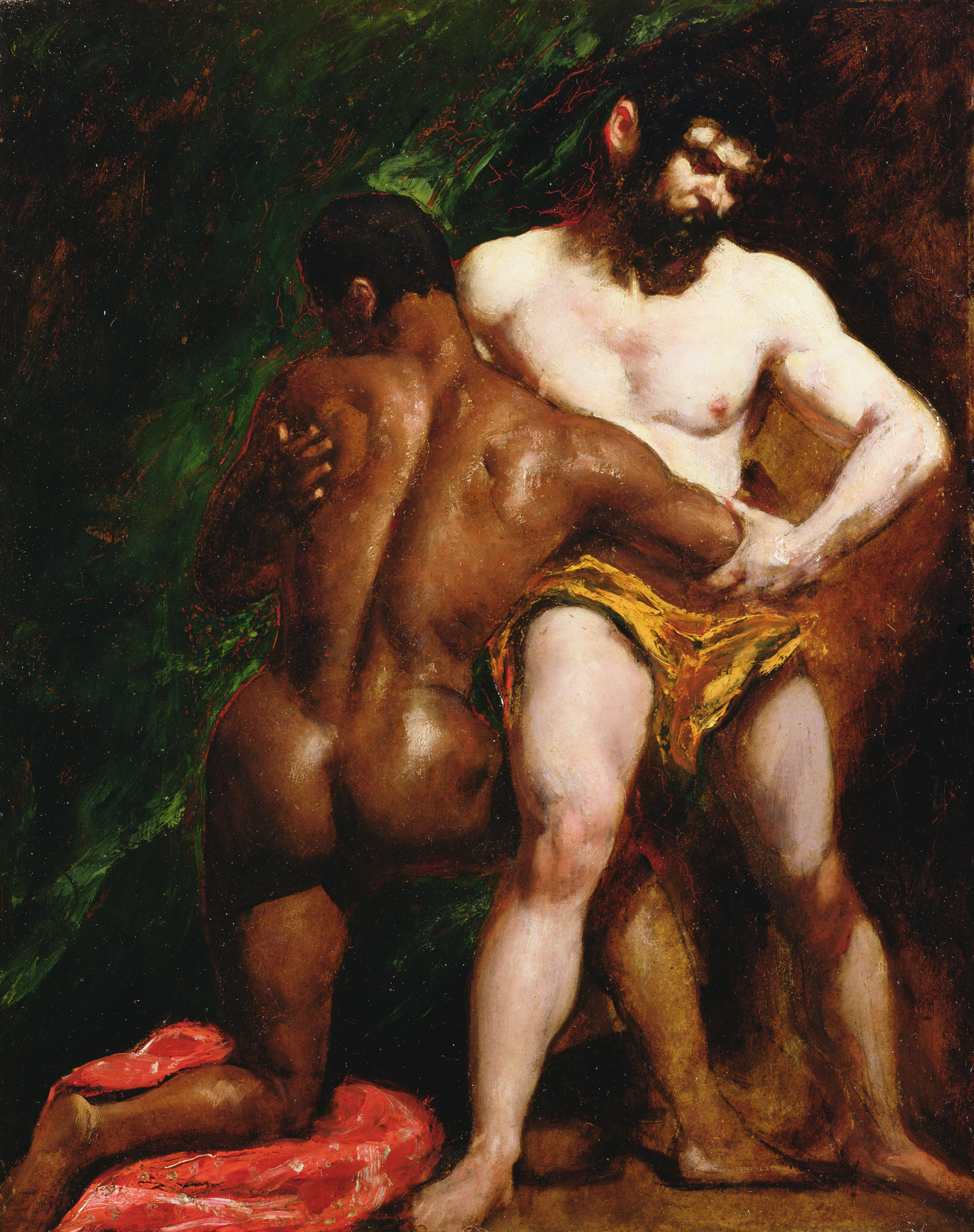
The Wrestlers, (William Etty, c. 1840) 53.5 by 68.6 cm (21.1 by 27.0 in), York Art Gallery

The Wrestlers is an oil painting on millboard by English artist William Etty, painted around 1840 and currently in the York Art Gallery, in York, England. It depicts a wrestling match between a black man and a white man, both glistening with sweat and under an intense light emphasising their curves and musculature. While little documentation of the painting exists prior to 1947, it is likely that it was painted over a period of three evenings at the life class of the Royal Academy.

The Royal Academy had moved to new premises in Trafalgar Square in 1837, and the studio used by the life class was cramped and hot, a fact thought to account for the sweatiness of the central figures. Etty was best known for his painting of nude or near-nude women in historical and mythological settings but had also painted men involved in various forms of combat.

In the period in which The Wrestlers was painted, sports were becoming increasingly popular, and the painting is both a reflection of this trend and a part of the English tradition of copying poses from classical Hellenistic works. It was also a time of change in the British attitude to race relations. Etty in this period was generally making a conscious effort to illustrate moral lessons in his work, and it is not clear whether he chose the topic as a form of social commentary or simply because the contrast between the black and white flesh tones was visually striking.

Although The Wrestlers was probably exhibited as part of a major retrospective of Etty's work in 1849, it then went into a private collection and was not publicly exhibited again for almost a century. In 1947 it was put on sale; with little interest from commercial galleries owing to its subject, it was bought for the bargain price of 30 guineas by the York Art Gallery, where it remains. The painting formed a part of major exhibitions in 2002 and 2011–12.

== Background ==
William Etty (1787–1849), the seventh son of a York baker and miller, had originally been an apprentice printer in Hull, but on completing his seven-year apprenticeship in 1805 moved to London to become an artist. In January 1807 he was admitted to the Royal Academy Schools as a probationer, and in July of that year became a student of renowned portrait painter Thomas Lawrence, studying under him for a year.

Strongly influenced by the works of Titian and Rubens, Etty became famous for painting nude figures in biblical, literary and mythological settings. He became well-respected for his ability to capture flesh tones accurately in painting, and for his fascination with contrasts in skin tones. Many of his peers greatly admired his work, and in February 1828 he defeated John Constable by 18 votes to five to become a full Royal Academician, at the time the highest honour available to an artist.

Between 1820 and 1829 Etty exhibited 15 paintings, of which 14 depicted nude figures. While some nude paintings by foreign artists existed in private collections in England, the country had no tradition of nude painting and the display and distribution of nude material to the public had been suppressed since the 1787 Proclamation for the Discouragement of Vice.

Etty was the first British artist to specialise in the nude, and the prurient reaction of the lower classes to these paintings caused concern throughout the 19th century. Although his portraits of male nudes were generally well received, (Note: Etty's male nude portraits were primarily of mythological heroes and classical combat, genres in which the depiction of male nudity was considered acceptable in England.) many critics condemned his recurrent depictions of female nudity as indecent.

== Composition ==
In my time, as a Student, I have known him set three or four models together. Now, it was a group of Graces; now, a composition of two or three Gladiators. Sometimes, a dark man or tawny female was introduced, for picturesque contrast with a fair form of the same sex.

— Maclise on Etty's arrangement of models at the Royal Academy life class

The Wrestlers is an oil study from life, depicting a black and a white wrestler grappling. Although at first glance the white wrestler appears to be dominant, the figures are in fact equally matched; this was unusual for the time, as it was a common belief in Britain in this period that black people were physically weaker than whites. Showing the subjects under bright light, the painting is a combination of intense juxtapositions between intimacy and violence, dark and light skin, and hard and soft surfaces. The black wrestler is naked; the white wrestler wears a loincloth, although it is possible that this was added after Etty's death. The intense light casts deep shadows, emphasising the curves and musculature of the wrestlers' bodies, as the skin of the two combatants is stretched and distorted under the pressure of the grapple. The figures are set against a dark green curtain and a brown wall, rather than in a wrestling ring.

The identity of the wrestlers is not known. Alison Smith, Lead Curator of British Art to 1900 at Tate, speculates that the white figure may have been John Wilton of Somerset, who had possibly been the model for Little John in Daniel Maclise's 1839 Robin Hood and His Merry Men Entertaining Richard the Lionheart in Sherwood Forest. (Note: "A Working Artist", writing anonymously in The Art-Union in 1841, described Wilton as "a 'Zummurzetshire man' but with such a head, face, and beard, as would have rejoiced Salvator. This gentleman has for some years cultivated his mustachios and his vegetables at the same time, of both of which he has a prolific crop.") The figures glisten with sweat. Art historian Sarah Victoria Turner speculates that this is not simply for dramatic effect, but reflects the fact that after the Royal Academy's 1837 move to its new building in Trafalgar Square the studio used by the life class was a cramped and poorly ventilated room lit by gaslight, which when crowded with students and with the lights on could become extremely hot.

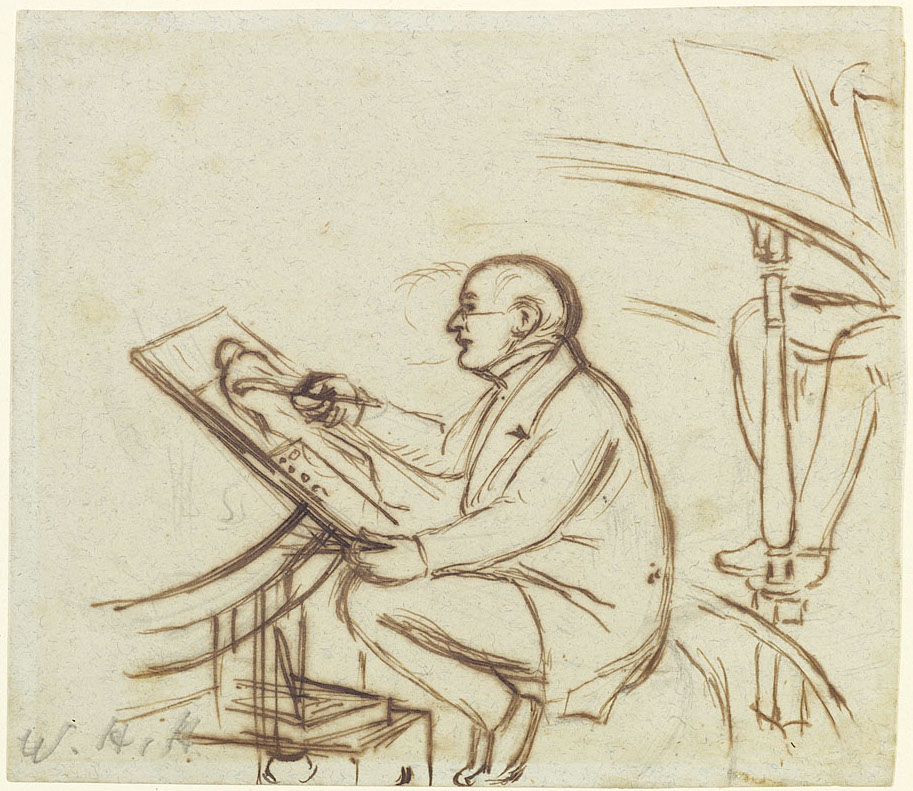
William Etty at the Life Class, William Holman Hunt (1840–1850, York Art Gallery)

The Wrestlers is thought to have been painted in around 1840. It is likely that it was executed at the Royal Academy's life class; despite his senior status, Etty continued to attend there throughout his life. While students at the class usually worked from a single model, Etty would occasionally arrange for "a Treat", in which a group of models would be used to create an entire composition for the students to sketch (often arranged in poses derived from Old Master paintings). Painted on millboard, The Wrestlers was probably executed over the course of three evenings. On the first evening Etty would have drawn the models in chalk or charcoal and inked the outline; on the second evening the figures would have been painted in oil paint, and on the third evening a thin glaze would have been applied to the painting to which colour would then have been added. (Note: As no records survive of the painting of The Wrestlers it is not certain how Etty worked, but it is well-documented that this three-day process was his usual method of working.)

=== Subject ===
Although best known for his paintings of women, Etty had also produced paintings of nude or semi-nude men engaged in combat, such as 1829's Benaiah. There was a tendency among British artists in this period to attempt to illustrate the physiques of strong and well-proportioned living men, as an indication that the best of British manhood had reached or surpassed the Hellenistic ideal which at that time was considered the model of perfection. Almost all artists, as part of their training, would be expected to draw from reproductions of classical statues in British museums, or to visit Italy and Greece to view the originals in situ. Etty, and other British artists of the day, would have been familiar with the technical issues of drawing men wrestling, as the Uffizi Wrestlers (the Pancrastinae) was one of the subjects new entrants to the Royal Academy Schools were required to draw. (Note: An early drawing of the Uffizi Wrestlers survives in one of Etty's sketchbooks.) Etty had also made lengthy visits to France and Italy in 1816, 1822–24 and 1830 to view and sketch the paintings and statuary of those countries, with additional visits to Belgium in 1840 and 1841 to view the works of Rubens, whom he greatly admired.

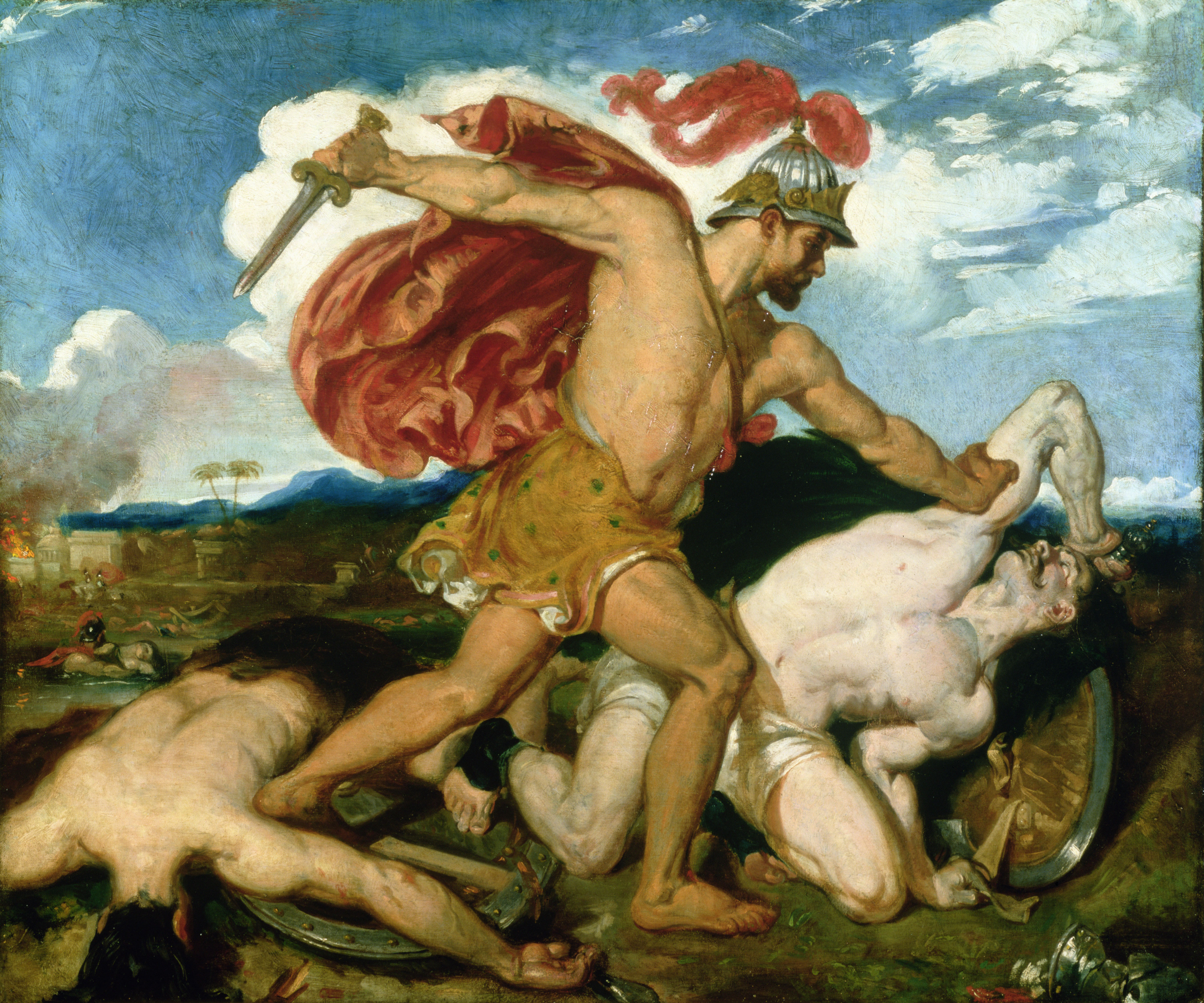
Benaiah (1829, York Art Gallery)

Moreover, as the Industrial Revolution took hold and the prevalence of manual labour declined, there were increasing concerns that British men would become unfit and undisciplined; images of sport and combat were thought to motivate the viewer to aspire to an ideal of physical strength which people were worried was becoming lost. Wrestling and boxing thus were popular subjects for artworks, and Etty had produced other paintings and sketches of men engaged in fights of one kind or another. It had become common for artists to use boxers and soldiers as models, as they had the strength and bearing considered desirable, and the discipline to hold a pose for long periods in the studio.

The motivation behind Etty's choice to pair a black and a white wrestler is not clear. Etty had painted black and Indian subjects in the past, (Note: Etty's first critically successful painting, The Triumph of Cleopatra, included black figures; he also painted portraits of black and Indian models.) and it was not unusual in that period for artists to use non-white models, but it was rare to show a black and a white figure embracing. It is possible that he was simply interested in the contrast between the flesh tones; it is documented that he would sometimes arrange models of different skin colours for that reason. It is also possible that he saw "primitive" black men as closer in spirit or physique to the wrestlers of the classical civilisations. Sarah Victoria Turner argues that combat was the only subject in which it would have been felt appropriate at the time to depict naked black and white figures in intimate closeness.

1840, the year in which The Wrestlers is likely to have been painted, saw the World Anti-Slavery Convention in London and the London exhibition of The Slave Ship and The Slave Trade, and race relations had become a major social and political issue. While black wrestlers and boxers—often former slaves from the United States or their descendants—were not unusual in England in the period, and the former slave Tom Molineaux had twice challenged for the boxing world championship in 1811, they were still treated with suspicion by many members of the public.

== Sale and exhibition ==
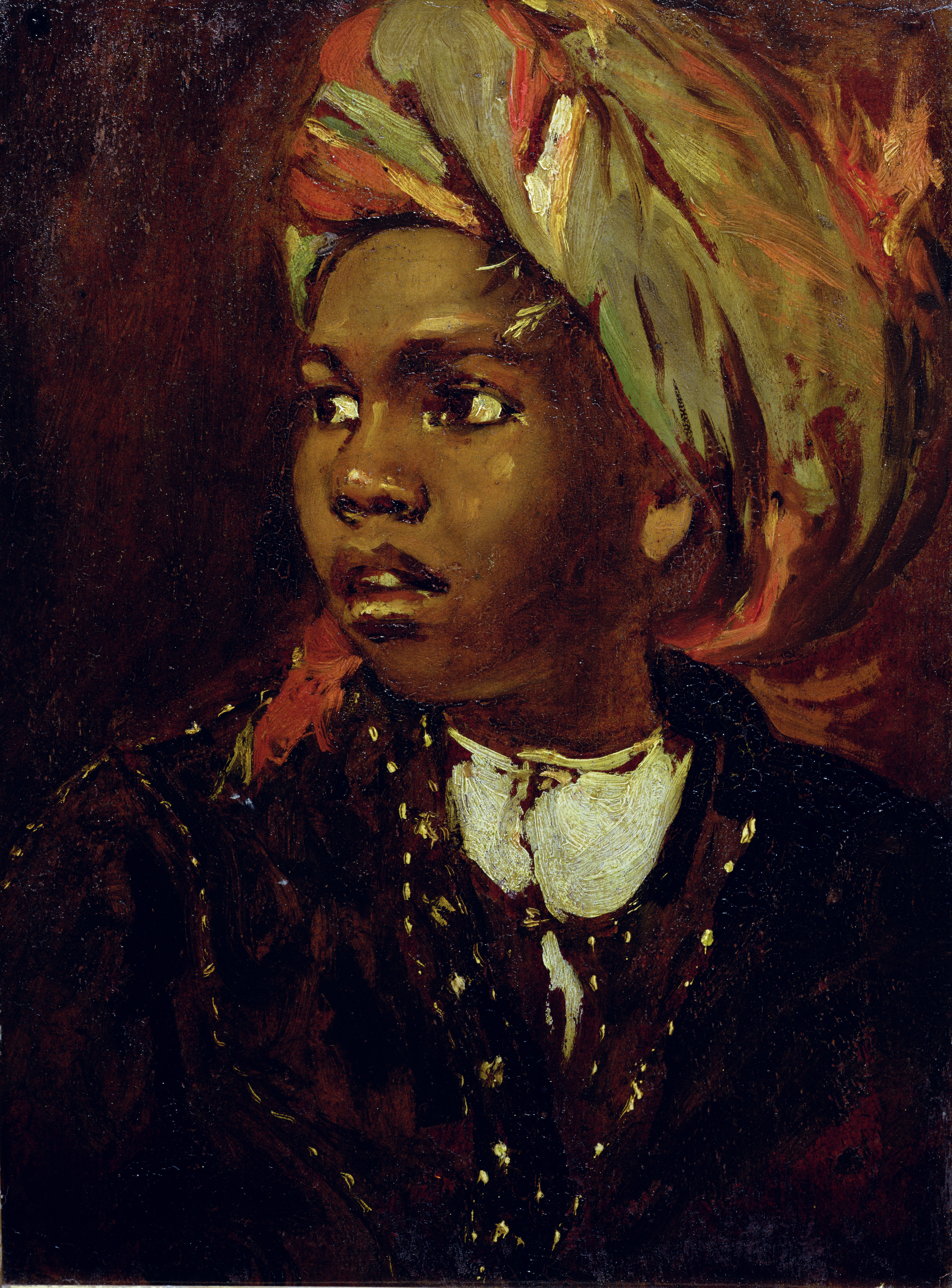
Etty had painted black models previously, such as Study of a Black Boy (1827–38, York Art Gallery)

Virtually no contemporary records or reviews of The Wrestlers exist, and it was probably sold to a private collector either on its completion or in the sale of over 800 works found in Etty's studio following his death; Dennis Farr's 1958 biography of Etty lists the painting exhibited in 1849 as "lent by C. W. Wass". (Note: C. W. Wass was a noted engraver who published engravings of some of Etty's works.) The Wrestlers was probably exhibited at the June 1849 Royal Society of Arts retrospective of over 130 works by Etty, shortly before his death on 13 November of that year. (Etty produced three paintings entitled The Wrestlers, and it is not certain which was the one exhibited in 1849, although it is thought likely to be this one.)

Etty died in 1849, and his work enjoyed a brief boom in popularity. Interest in him declined over time, and by the end of the 19th century the value of all his paintings had fallen below their original levels. Following his death, nude paintings went out of fashion very rapidly in Britain.

An old man, semi-nude, is stepping forward while another man, seen from the back and of dark complexion, embraces his legs. The picture is in my opinion not only a genuine Etty, but very well painted indeed, and as the subject is quite unsuitable for the art trade, it may go at a very cheap figure.

— Art dealer Henry Montagu Roland, founder of art dealers Roland, Browse and Delbanco, on The Wrestlers, 1947.

The Wrestlers was sold by a private collector on 31 October 1947. Owing to its subject matter there was little interest from commercial galleries, and it was bought by York Civic Trust for the bargain price of 30 guineas (£31.50; about £960 in 2023 terms (Note: UK Retail Price Index inflation figures are based on data from Clark, Gregory (2017). "The Annual RPI and Average Earnings for Britain, 1209 to Present (New Series)". MeasuringWorth.)). It was immediately presented to the York Art Gallery, where it remains. The painting was one of five works by Etty exhibited in Tate Britain's 2002 exhibition Exposed: The Victorian Nude, and was a central component of a major retrospective of Etty's work at the York Art Gallery in 2011–12.
