= A View in Cairo =

Painting by David Roberts

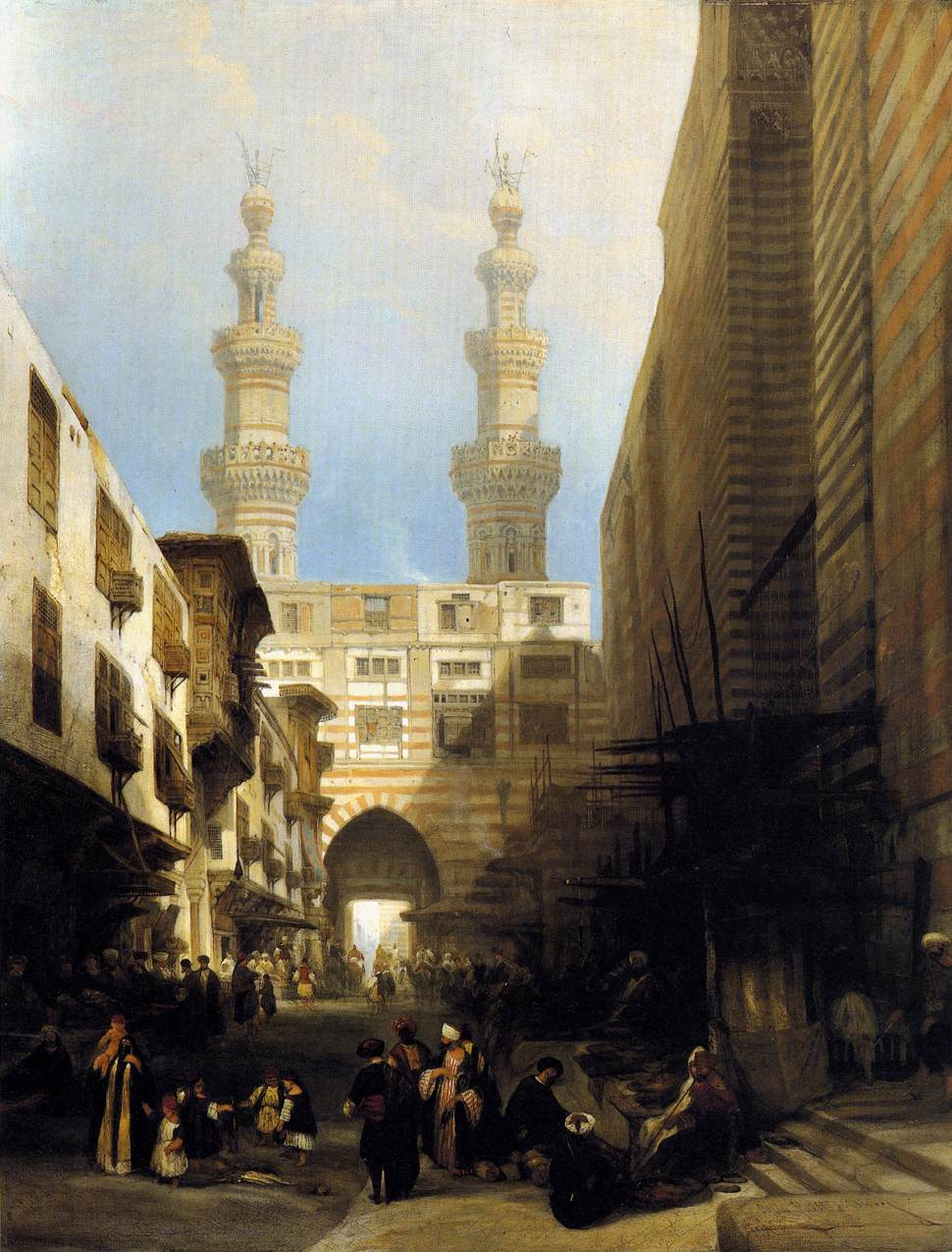
- Artist: David Roberts
- Year: 1840
- Type: Oil on canvas, cityscape painting
- Dimensions: 91 cm × 70 cm (36 in × 28 in)
- Location: Osborne House, East Cowes, Isle of Wight

A View in Cairo is an oil painting on canvas by the British artist David Roberts, from 1840. It is held at the Osborne House, in East Cowes, at the Isle of Wight.

== History and description ==
It portrays a view of the Metawalea neighborhood of Cairo in Egypt. Beyond the city gates is the Mosque of Sultan al-Muayyad with its prominent minarets.

Roberts first made his name as a scenic designer working at the Theatre Royal, Drury Lane and Covent Garden in the Regency era. Having previously visited Spain, he toured the Middle East in the late 1830s, visiting Egypt and Lebanon.

The contrasts of light and shade and portrayal of the locals in the foreground demonstrate the painter's skill at building on thr purely topographical to improve the pictures's effect. The following year Roberts was elected a full member of the Royal Academy based on his Middle Eastern works. The painting was displayed at the Royal Academy Exhibition of 1840 at the National Gallery in London, where it was purchased by Queen Victoria. It remains in the Royal Collection today at the Billiard Room of Osborne House.

== See also ==
- The Gate of Metawaley, an 1843 painting by Roberts depicting the same district of Cairo

== Bibliography ==
- Clarke, Deborah & Remington, Vanessa. Scottish Artists 1750-1900: From Caledonia to the Continent. Royal Collection Trust, 2015.
- Sim, Katherine. David Roberts R.A., 1796–1864: A Biography. Quartet Books, 1984.
