= Ida Nilsson (artist) =

Swedish sculptor (1840–1920)

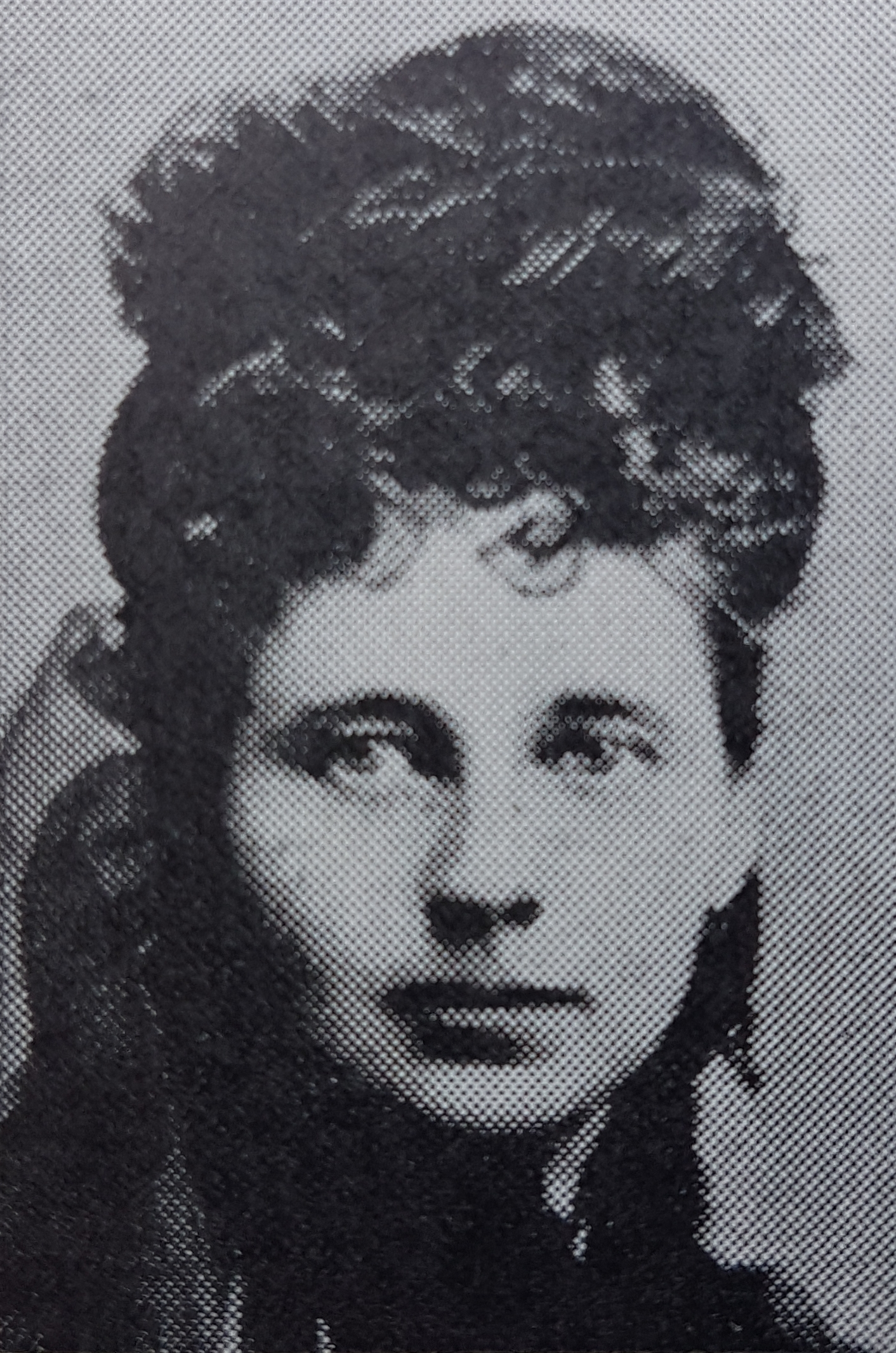
- Born: Ida Göthilda Nilsson; 7 February 1840; Lund, Sweden
- Died: 24 December 1920 (aged 80); Lund, Sweden
- Known for: Sculpture

Ida Göthilda Nilsson (7 February 1840 – 24 December 1920) was a Swedish artist (sculptor).

Daughter of the professor and zoologist in Lund, Sven Nilsson, she was active as her father's assistant. Nilsson was also a student of the Danish artist Jacob Jerichau. She participated in the exhibit of the Royal Swedish Academy of Art in 1875, and was also represented in the Royal Swedish Academy of Science.
