= Bridge of Sighs (disambiguation) =

The Bridge of Sighs is a bridge in Venice. Bridge of Sighs may also refer to:

== Arches, bridges and buildings ==
=== Europe ===
- Bridge of Sighs, Cambridge, a bridge in Cambridge, England
- Bridge of Sighs, Chester, a bridge in Chester, England
- Bridge of Sighs, Oxford, a bridge in Oxford, England
- Bridge of Sighs, an uncovered bridge in Glasgow, Scotland from the cathedral to the Glasgow Necropolis
- Långholmsbron, a bridge in Stockholm, Sweden
- The Bridge of Sighs (Seufzerbrücke), at the Römer, a medieval building in Frankfurt am Main, Germany
- The Bridge of Sighs (Sóhajok hídja), a bridge in Szeged, Hungary, connecting the City Hall and House of Labor buildings by Széchenyi Square

=== North America ===
- Bridge of Sighs, a bridge in the Santa Barbara County Courthouse, Santa Barbara, California
- Bridge of Sighs, the Virginia Street Bridge in Reno, Nevada, known for being the place where newly divorced women coming from the Washoe County Courthouse would toss their wedding rings into the Truckee River
- Bridge of Sighs, a bridge between the Allegheny County Courthouse and the old county jail in downtown Pittsburgh, Pennsylvania, United States, which has been deemed a National Historic Landmark
- Bridge of Sighs, a bridge that connected The Tombs with the Criminal Courts Building in New York City
- Bridge of Sighs, one of the few natural arches in the Grand Canyon that is visible from the Colorado River (at mile 35.6, approx 57.3 km on the right); it is located in Redwall limestone and has a span of 4 metres (15 feet) and a height of 9 metres (30 feet).
- Bridge of Sighs, a bridge at The Venetian in Las Vegas

=== South America ===
- Puente de los Suspiros, a bridge in Barranco District, Lima, Peru

== Art ==
- The Bridge of Sighs (painting), an 1835 painting by William Etty
- Venice, the Bridge of Sighs, an 1840 painting by J.M.W. Turner

== Literature ==
- Bridge of Sighs (novel), a novel by Richard Russo
- Bridge of Sighs, a novel by Jane Lane
- Bridge of Sighs: Chelsea's 1996–97 Season, a book by Steven Downes
- Le pont des soupirs (The Bridge of Sighs), a novel by Michel Zevaco
- The Bridge of Sighs, a novel by Olen Steinhauer
- The Bridge of Sighs (poem), a poem by Thomas Hood

== Music ==
- Bridge of Sighs (Robin Trower album), or the title song
- Bridge of Sighs (Ralph McTell album), or the title song
- "Bridge of Sighs", a 1900 song written by James Thornton
- El puente de los suspiros (The Bridge of Sighs), a Peruvian waltz song by Chabuca Granda
- Le pont des soupirs (The Bridge of Sighs), an opéra bouffe, or operetta, by Jacques Offenbach
- Bridge of Sighs (Shakti album), a 1977 composition by McLaughlin/ Shankar from the studio album Natural Elements

== Film ==
- The Bridge of Sighs (1925 film), an American drama film
- The Bridge of Sighs (1936 film), an American crime film
- Il ponte dei sospiri (also known as The Avenger of Venice in English), a 1964 Italian adventure film
