= Venice from the Giudecca =

Painting by J. M. W. Turner

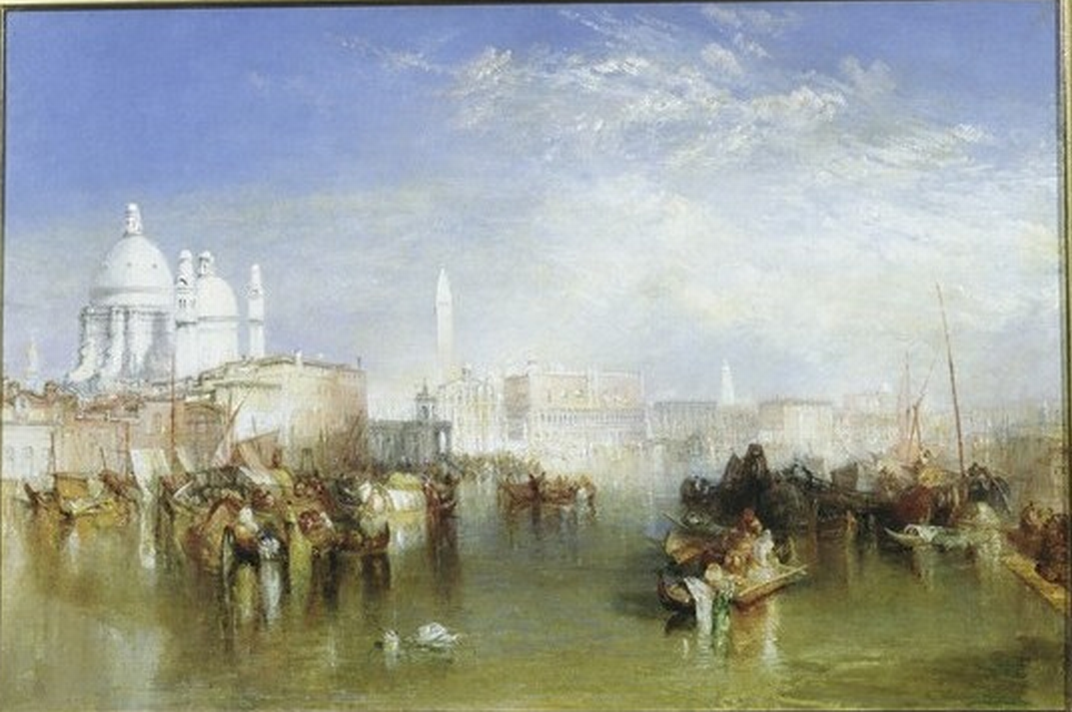
- Artist: J. M. W. Turner
- Year: 1840
- Type: Oil on canvas, landscape painting
- Dimensions: 61 cm × 91.4 cm (24 in × 36.0 in)
- Location: Victoria and Albert Museum, London
- Website: collections.vam.ac.uk/...mallord/

Venice from the Giudecca is an 1840 landscape painting by the British artist J.M.W. Turner. It depicts a view of Venice, then part of the Austrian Empire. It features the white dome of the Santa Maria della Salute seen from the island of Giudecca.

It was displayed at the Royal Academy's Summer Exhibition of 1840 along with another view of the city Venice, the Bridge of Sighs, where it received a mixed reception. Today the painting is in the collection of the Victoria and Albert Museum in South Kensington, having been donated as part of the Sheepshanks Gift by the art collector John Sheepshanks in 1857.

== See also ==
- List of paintings by J. M. W. Turner

== Bibliography ==
- Bailey, Anthony. J.M.W. Turner: Standing in the Sun. Tate Enterprises Ltd, 2013.
- Costello, Leo. J.M.W. Turner and the Subject of History. Routledge, 2017.
- Finberg, Alexander Joseph. In Venice with Turner. Cotswold Gallery, 1930.
- Hamilton, James. Turner - A Life. Sceptre, 1998.
- Reynolds, Graham. Turner. Thames & Hudson, 2022.
