= Riva degli Schiavoni =

Waterfront area in Venice, Italy

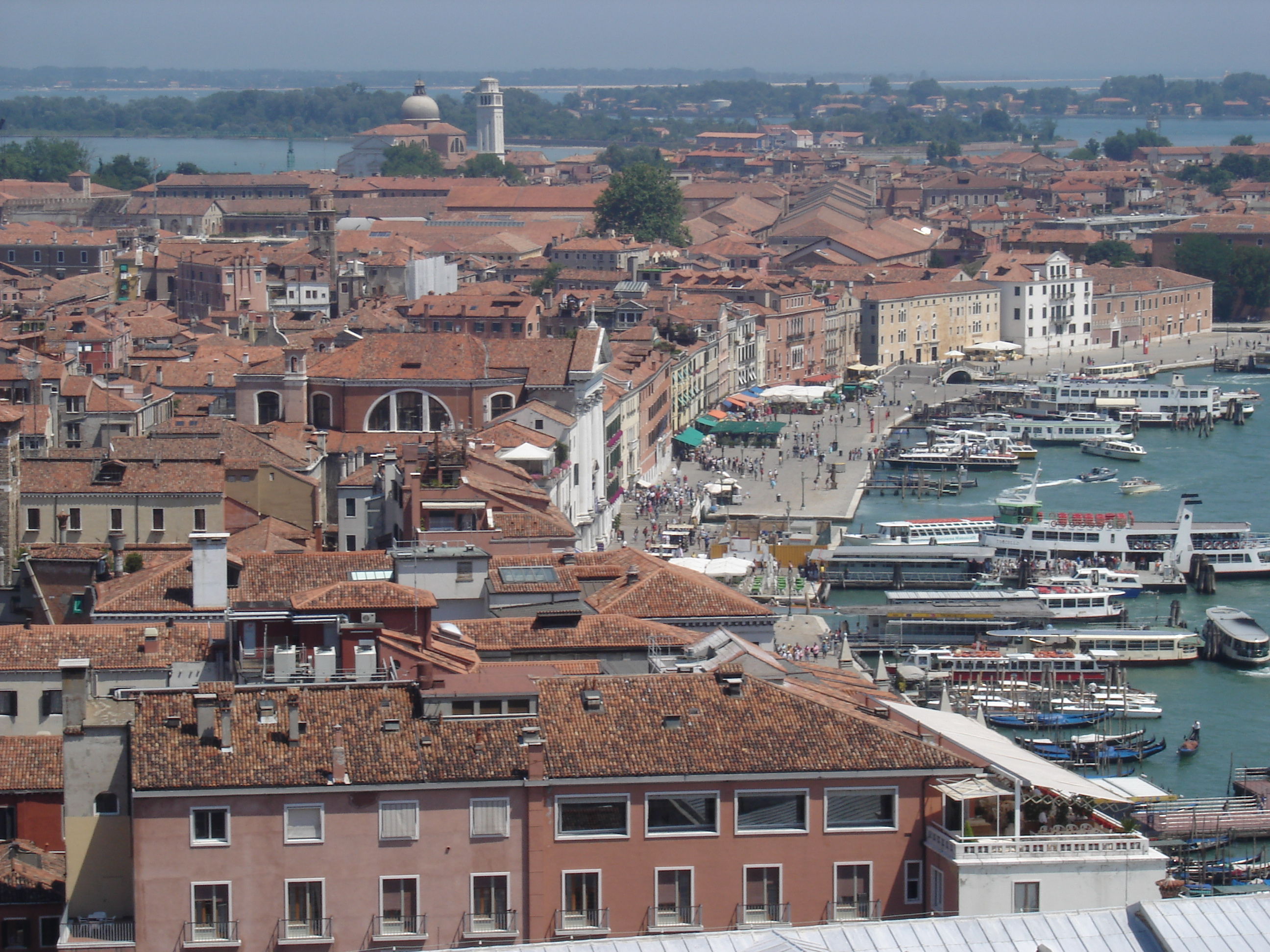
- Aerial view of the Riva degli Schiavoni
- Part of: Castello, Venice
- Length: 850 m (2,790 ft)
- Postal code: 30122
- Coordinates: 45°26′02″N 12°20′42″E

Construction
- Construction start: 9th century

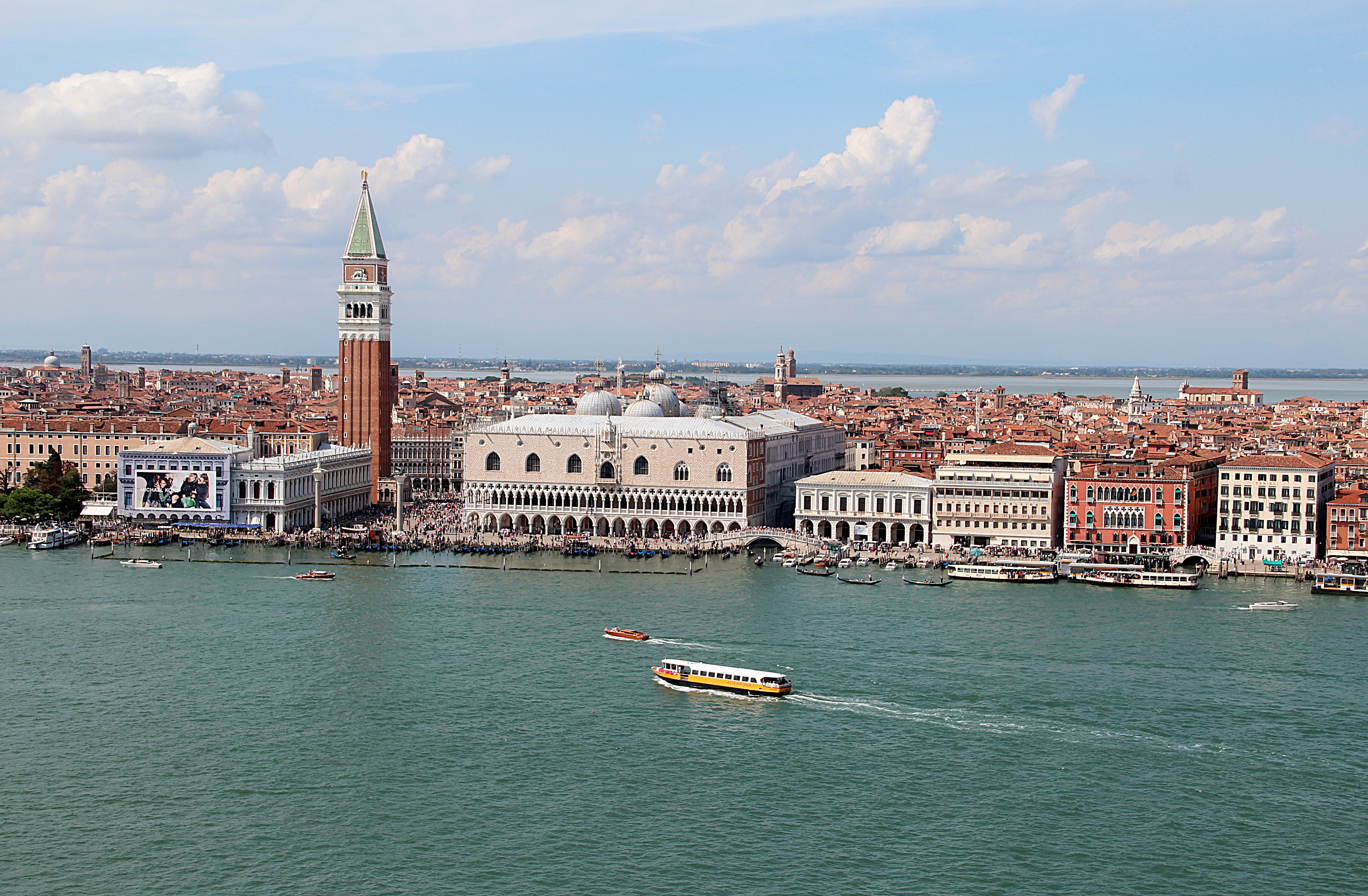
Panorama

The Riva degli Schiavoni is a monumental waterfront in Venice. It is located in the sestiere of Castello and extends along the San Marco basin in the stretch from the Ponte della Paglia bridge, close to the Doge's Palace to the rio di Ca' di Dio.

== History ==
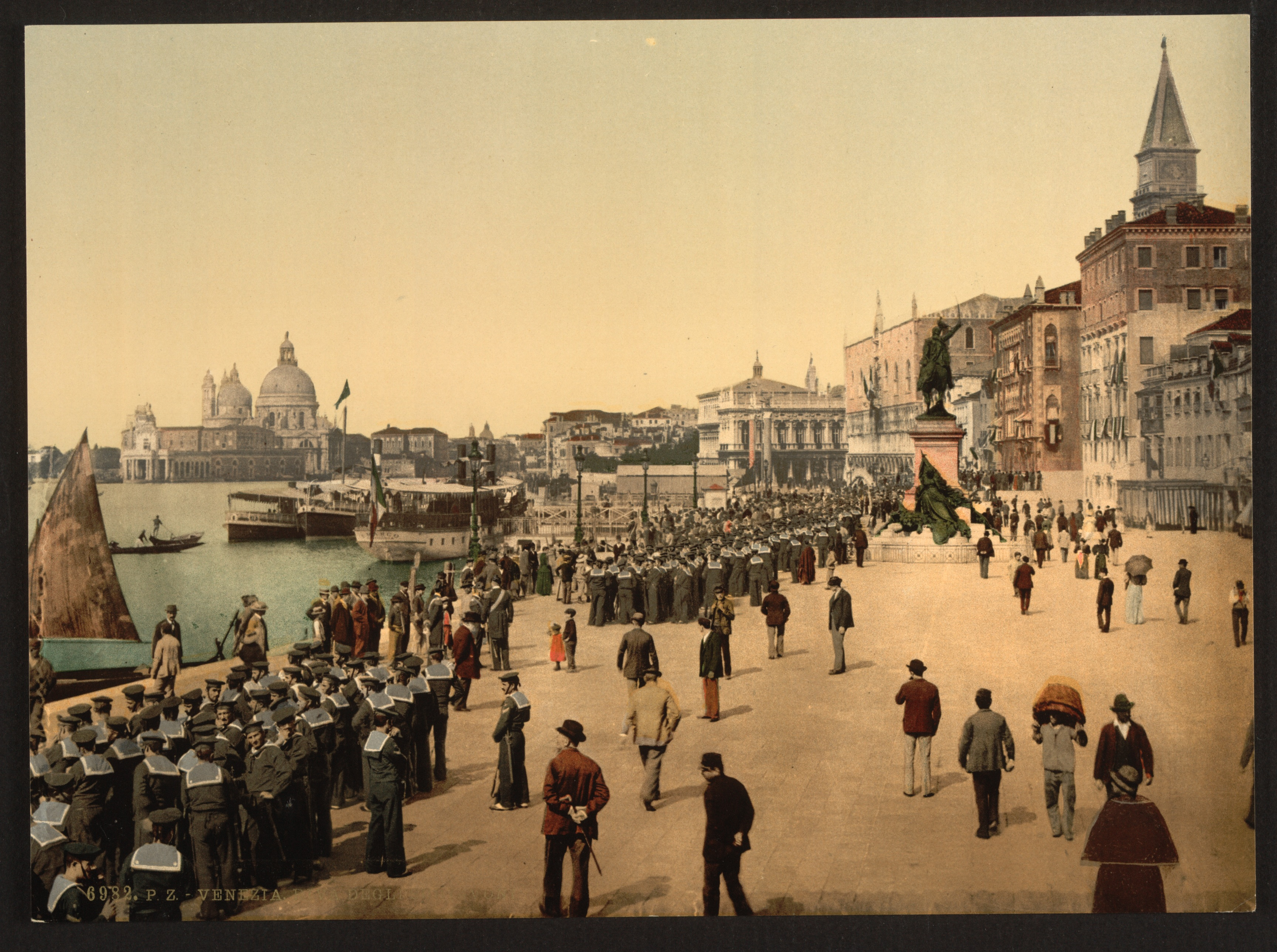
Riva degli Schiavoni between 1890 and 1900

The building of the shore begun probably as early as the 9th century and had its first expansion in 1060 with the draining of a marshy area. In 1324 the riva was paved for the first time, using terracotta paving. The shore was originally much narrower than the current one, being slightly wider than the Ponte della Paglia, as can also be seen from Jacopo de' Barbari 's plan of the 1500s and from countless paintings, prints and engravings. The enlargement to the current size was only deliberated in 1780 and finished in 1782.

It was named for the Slavic merchants from Dalmatia, which in the days of the Republic of Venice was also called Slavonia or Schiavonia, who brought cargo to Venice from across the Adriatic Sea and landed here with their merchant ships and also had their trading stalls. The riva formed an integral part of the commercial port of Venice and was of very considerable importance due to its proximity to Piazza san marco and the center of Venetian political power.

There are other landmarks named after the early Slav merchants such as Palazzo Schiavoni, Scuola di San Giorgio degli Schiavoni, and a naval detachment of Oltremarini, a mercenary group of Slavs either from the Montenegrin or Dalmatian litoral who as uskoks decided to join the Republic of Venice and fight a common enemy in the Candian Wars. Also, today Schiavone is a common Italian surname. In Italian schiavona is a basket-hilted sword.

In 1172 on the Riva at the entrance to Calle delle Rasse, Marco Cassolo stabbed Doge Vitale II Michiel who was on his way to the nearby church of San Zaccaria for Easter celebrations. Captured immediately, Cassolo was tried, convicted and executed, and the Senate resolved that his house, which was located on the Riva at the very spot of the attack, should be razed to the ground and forbade its reconstruction in stone in perpetuity, allowing only one-story wooden dwellings to be built. The route the doge had to take to reach the church of San Zaccaria was also changed: no longer along the Riva degli Schiavoni but internally through the campo dei santi Filippo e Giacomo. The ban on stone construction was respected until 1948, when the wooden houses were torn down and replaced by the current modern wing of the Hotel Danieli.

During Austrian rule, in 1851 Alderman Bembo presented a plan for the construction of a city bathing establishment in San Marco Basin. The project, commissioned from the architects Fisola and Cadorin, called for the doubling in width of the Schiavoni bank, with the construction of a second row of buildings, for the time modern, facing the San Marco basin, as well as the doubling of the Ponte della Paglia, Ponte del rio di Vin, Ponte dei Greci and ponte della Ca' di Dio bridges. The project, highly controversial because of its very heavy impact, was later finally rejected in 1854 by the provincial delegate.

Today it is a promenade and one of Venice's most famous streets.

== Buildings and monuments ==
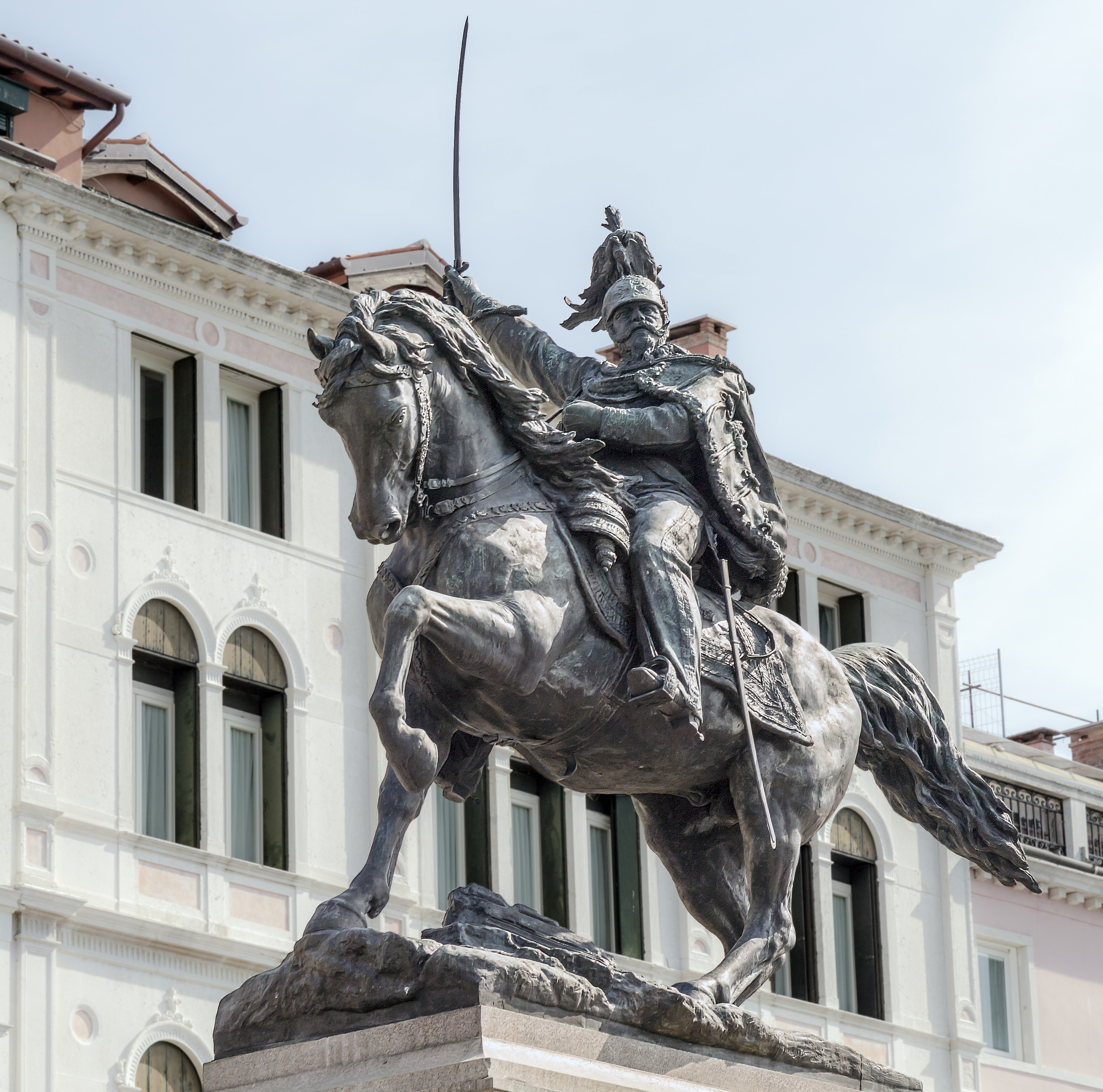
Monument to Victor Emmanuel II in Venice.

Several buildings of special historical or architectural significance face the shore. Proceeding in the direction from the Palazzo Ducale toward the arsenal, they are encountered in order:

- Ponte della Paglia, the bridge over the Rio del palazzo, which marks the beginning of the riva
- Palazzo delle Prigioni Nuove, connected to the Doge's Palace by the ponte dei Sospiri
- Modern hotel Danieli Excelsior at the entrance to Calle delle Rasse
- Former palazzo Dandolo currently home to the Hotel Danieli, one of the most luxurious in the city
- Ponte del Vin, the bridge over the rio del Vin
- Bronze Monument to Victor Emmanuel II to Victor Emmanuel II, created in 1887 by sculptor Ettore Ferrari
- Little palace where writer Henry James lived during his stay in Venice
- Ponte de la Pietà, the bridge over the Rio dei Greci
- Santa Maria della Pietà to which the school of the same name belonged where Antonio Vivaldi composed and performed his music
- Ponte del Sepolcro, the bridge over the Rio della Pietà
- Palazzo Gabrielli, now home to the luxury hotel of the same name
- Ponte della Ca' di Dio, which marks the end of the Riva degli Schiavoni
