= Bridge of Sighs =

Bridge over a canal in Venice

Bridge of Sighs Ponte dei Sospiri
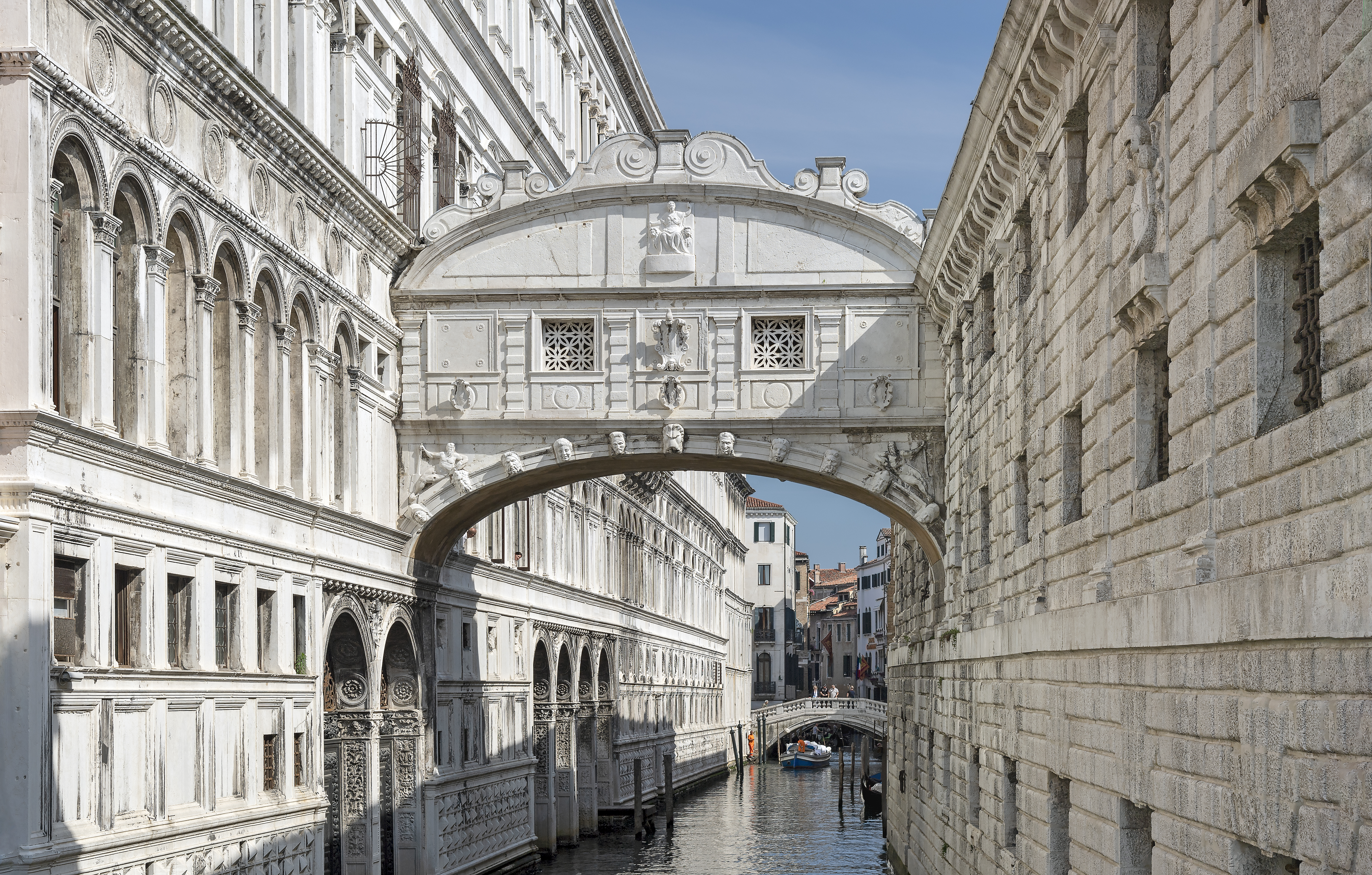
- Bridge of Sighs on Rio del Palazzo
- Coordinates: 45°26′03″N 12°20′27″E
- Crosses: Rio di Palazzo

Characteristics
- Design: Arch bridge
- Material: Istrian stone
- Total length: 11 metres (36 ft)

History
- Designer: Antonio da Ponte
- Construction start: 1600
- Construction end: ca. 1603^{Ref?}

Location
- Click on the map for a fullscreen view

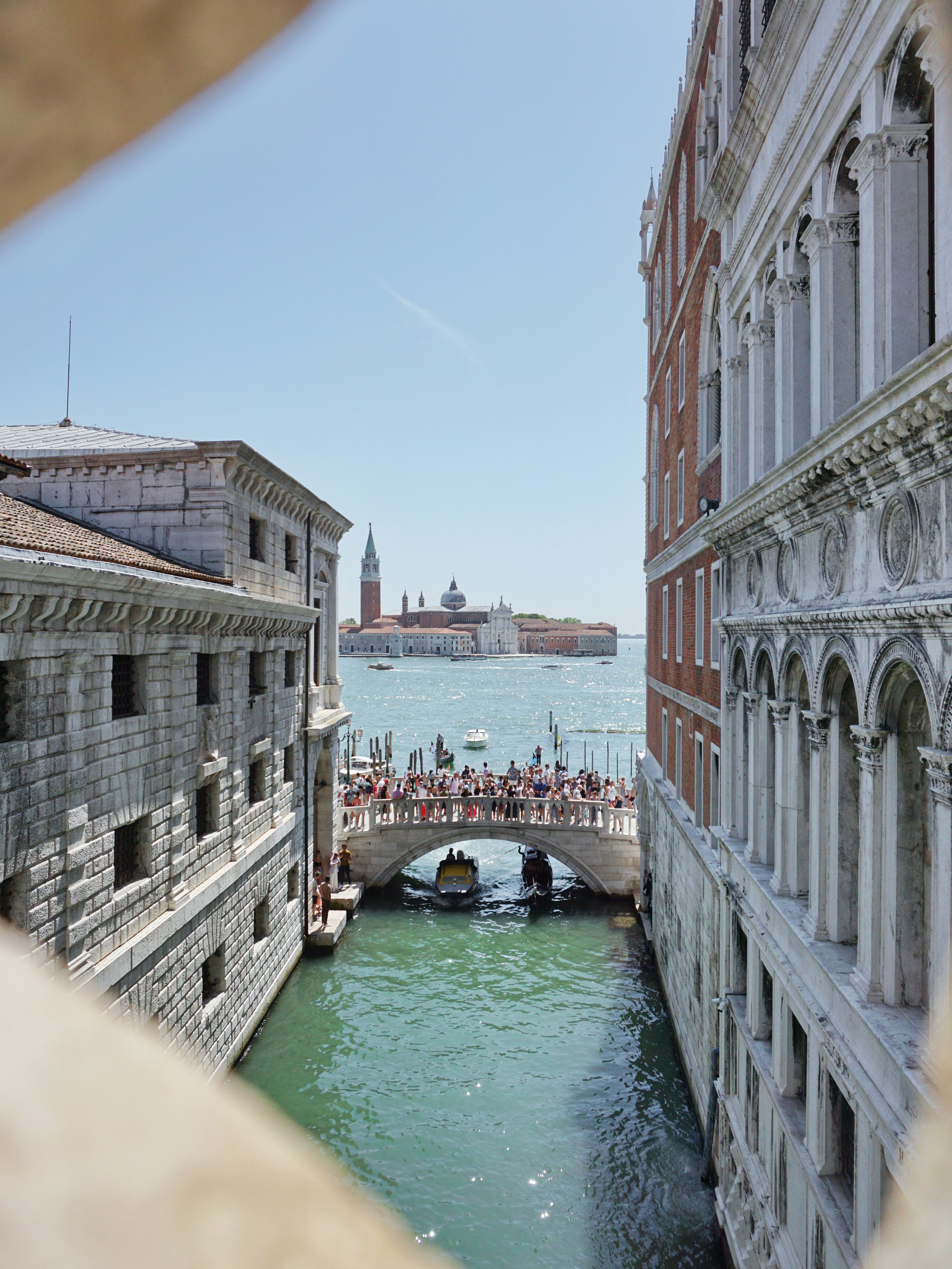
The eponymous south view from the Bridge of Sighs, with Ponte della Paglia and San Giorgio Maggiore

The Bridge of Sighs (Italian: Ponte dei Sospiri, Venetian: Ponte de i Sospiri) is a bridge in Venice, Italy. It connects the Doge's Palace with the New Prison across Rio di Palazzo.

== Architecture ==
After the gaols in the Doge's Palace itself (the pozzi) became too small, architect Gianantonio Rusconi was commissioned in 1580 to design a prison building to be erected northeast of the Doge's Palace across Rio di Palazzo. An extension was already decided in 1567 and completed in 1574. Rusconi died in the late 1580s, and Antonio da Ponte took over for the final south wing, designing the south façade to Riva degli Schiavoni and the lagoon, the only elaborate wall of a building otherwise completely bare of decoration. The fortress-like appearance was lent from the Mannerist Mint (the Zecca) on the other side of the Piazzetta di San Marco, built by Jacopo Sansovino about forty years earlier. Da Ponte had also been responsible for the reconstruction of the Doge's Palace after a fire in 1574 and had won the competition for the rebuilding of the Rialto Bridge in 1587; he died in 1597. To ensure secure passage from the interrogation rooms and the court to the prison cells da Ponte's nephew Antonio Contin, who was also his pupil, designed an enclosed bridge over the Rio di Palazzo, which separates the Palazzo Ducale from the Prigioni Nuove ("new prisons"). The interior was created with two gangways separated by a wall, so that the convicted prisoners would not meet those who were just going to be presented to the courts. The bridge was built soon after 1600.

=== Description ===
The eleven meter wide bridge is made of white Istrian limestone. The south and north facades are symmetrical, constructed over a single jolted arch, which is echoed by the roofline topped with volutes, in "an inappropriately frivolous way" seemingly heralding the Baroque. The molding of the bottom arch is decorated with a row of eleven sculpted heads (the central one a lion's head) and reclining figures in the spandrels. The enclosed gangway has two windows on each side, each with openwork in stone in the form of four eight-leaf flowers. Between them in the center the coat of arms of Doge Marino Grimani is displayed, above it the allegorical figure of justice.

== Etymology ==
The notion of the "Bridge of Sighs" or Ponte dei Sospiri is a Romantic creation of the 19th century. Although there was nothing romantic about it, the look from the bridge was imagined as the last view of the outside world that convicts saw before their imprisonment (and therefore sighing). The English name was bestowed by Lord Byron as a translation from the Italian.

== Resonance in culture ==
=== Copies ===
Numerous other bridges around the world had their blueprint in form and function in the Ponte dei Sospiri, and have been nicknamed after it – see Bridge of Sighs (disambiguation). The American architect H. H. Richardson for example used the bridge as inspiration when designing part of the Allegheny County Jail complex in Pittsburgh. It was completed in 1888 and features a similar enclosed arched walkway that connects the courthouse and jail, therefore bearing the same name.

=== Literature ===
The Bridge of Sighs features heavily in the plot of the 1979 film A Little Romance. One of the characters tells of a tradition that if a couple kiss in a gondola beneath the Bridge of Sighs in Venice at sunset while the church bells toll, they will be in love forever.

=== Music ===
The 1861 opera Le pont des soupirs by Jacques Offenbach has the name of the bridge as a title (in French).

Bridge of Sighs is the title of the second solo studio album released in April 1974 by English rock guitarist and songwriter, Robin Trower.

A Bridge of Sighs is mentioned in the opening line of “Itchycoo Park” by the Small Faces. It is mentioned also in "A Song for Europe" from Roxy Music's 1973 Album Stranded: "Through silken waters my gondola glides, and the bridge – it sighs..."

Marillion, an English progressive rock band, mentions the bridge in their song "Jigsaw", singing "We are Renaissance children becalmed beneath the Bridge of Sighs".

David Sylvian mentions crossing the bridge in his song "I Surrender", from the album Dead Bees on a Cake.

Giles Corey, an American slowcore band, likewise mentions the bridge in their song "No One Is Ever Going To Want Me".

== Gallery ==
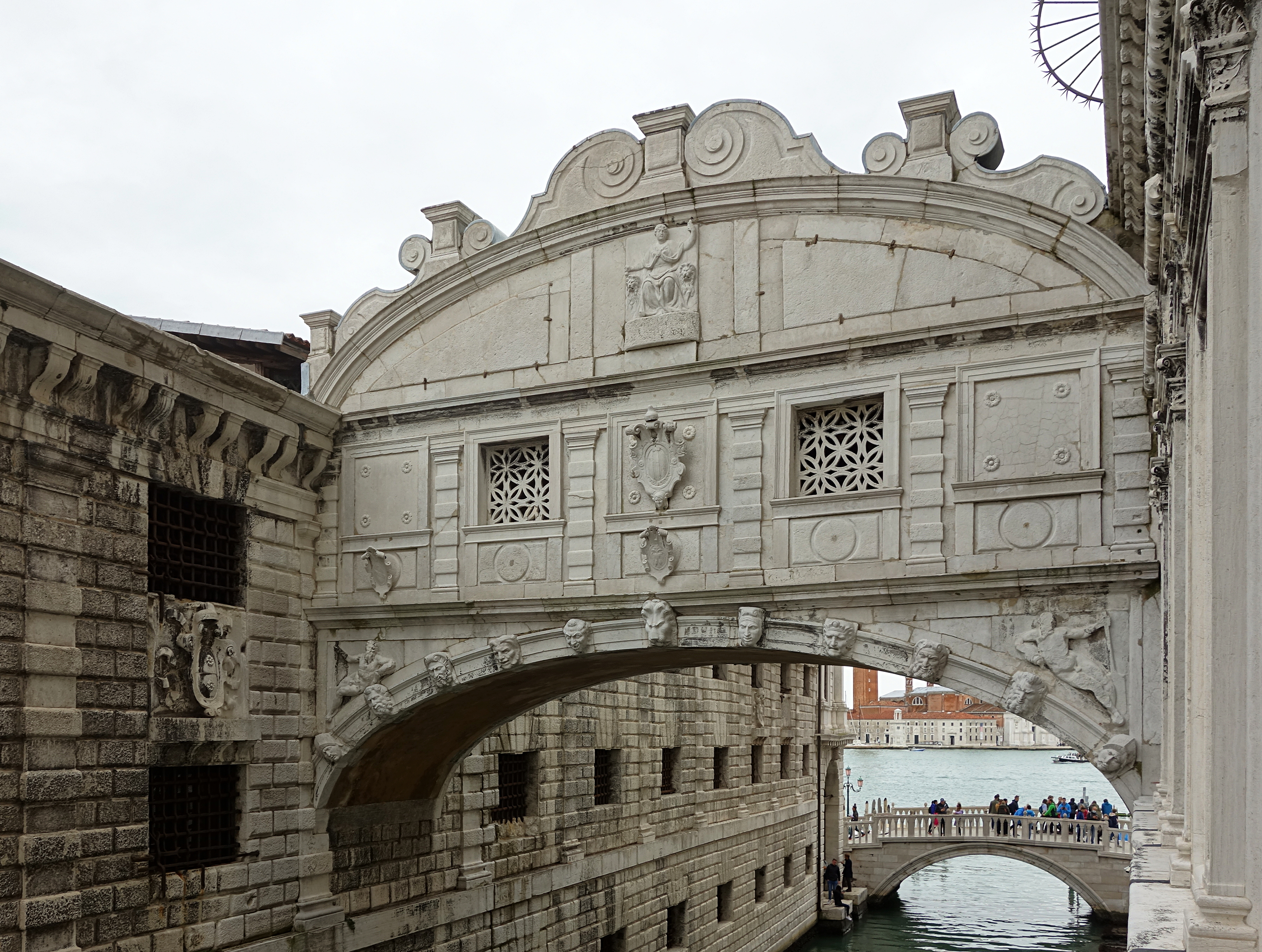
View from a window of the Doge's Palace with north face of the bridge

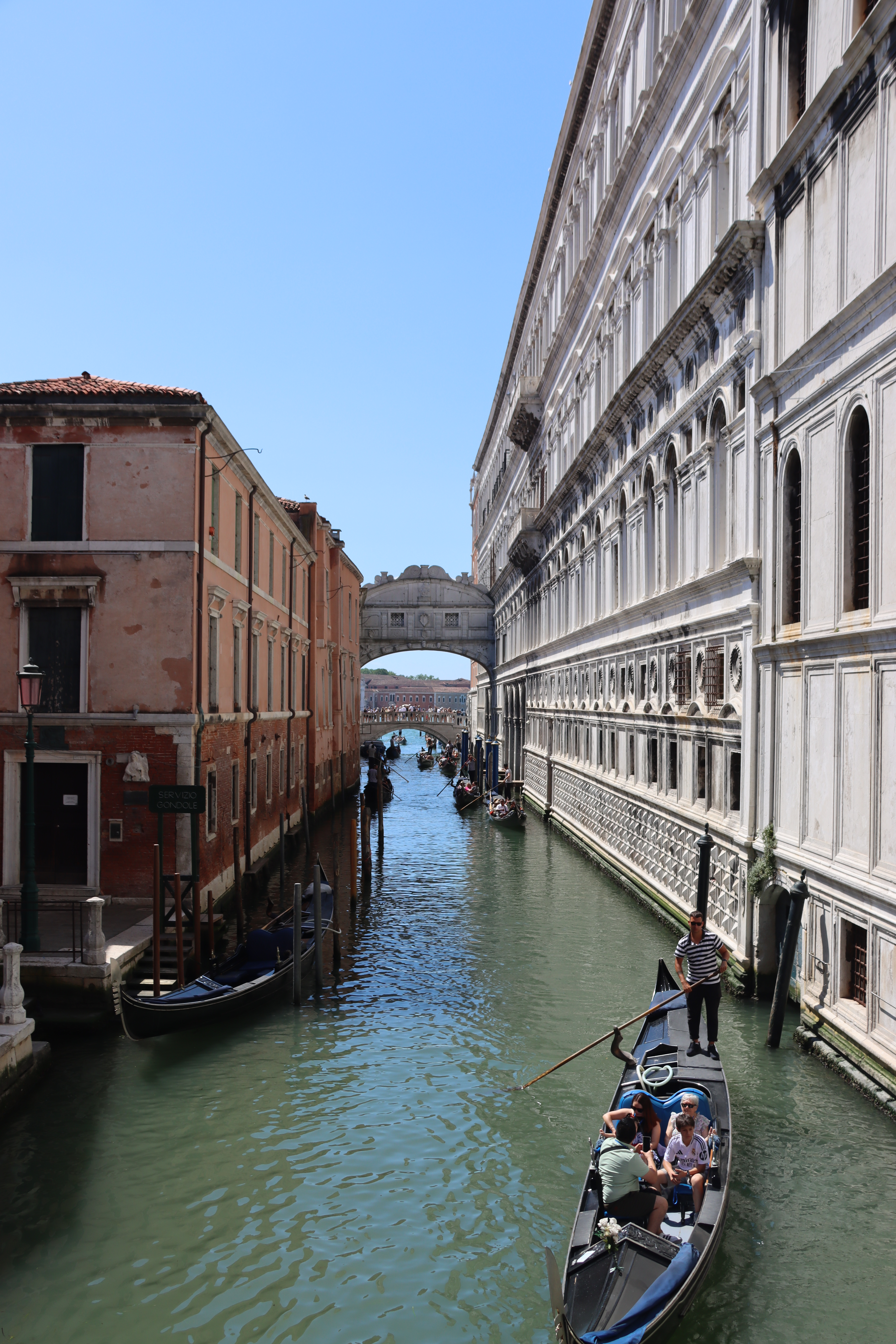
View from Ponte della Canonica looking south

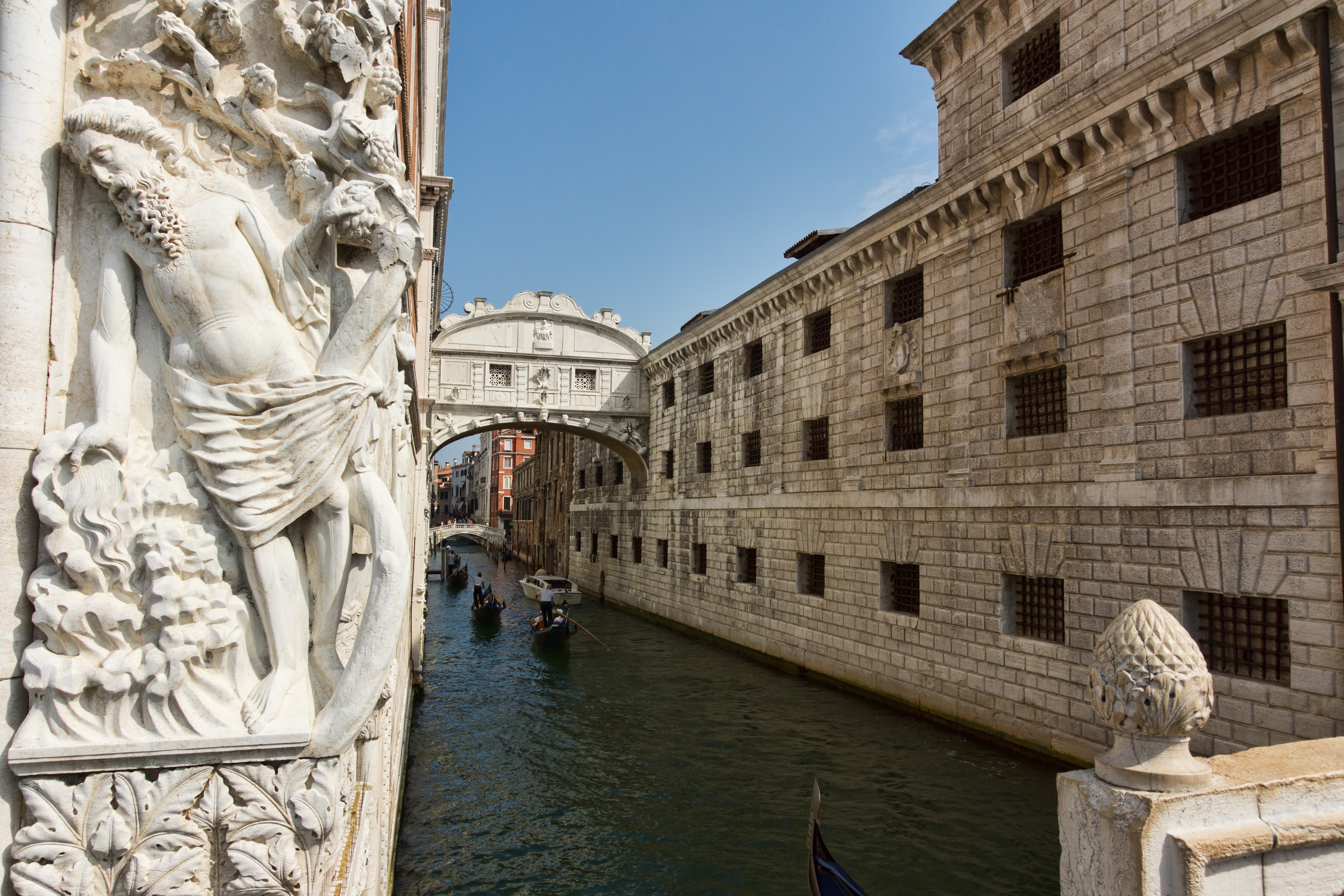
Seen from Ponte della Paglia at the embankment of the lagoon

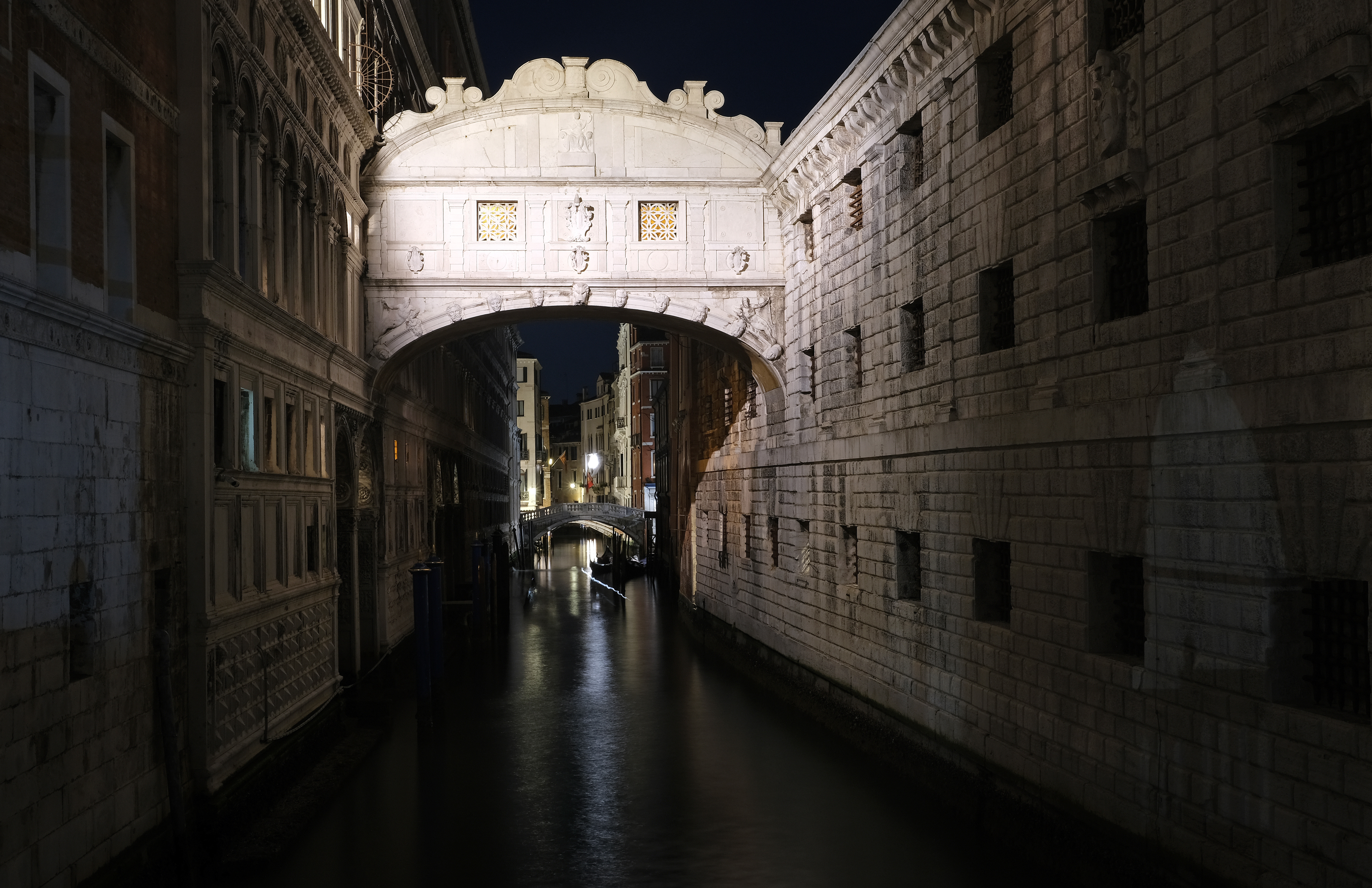
The Bridge of Sighs seen by night
Artistic renderings of the bridge

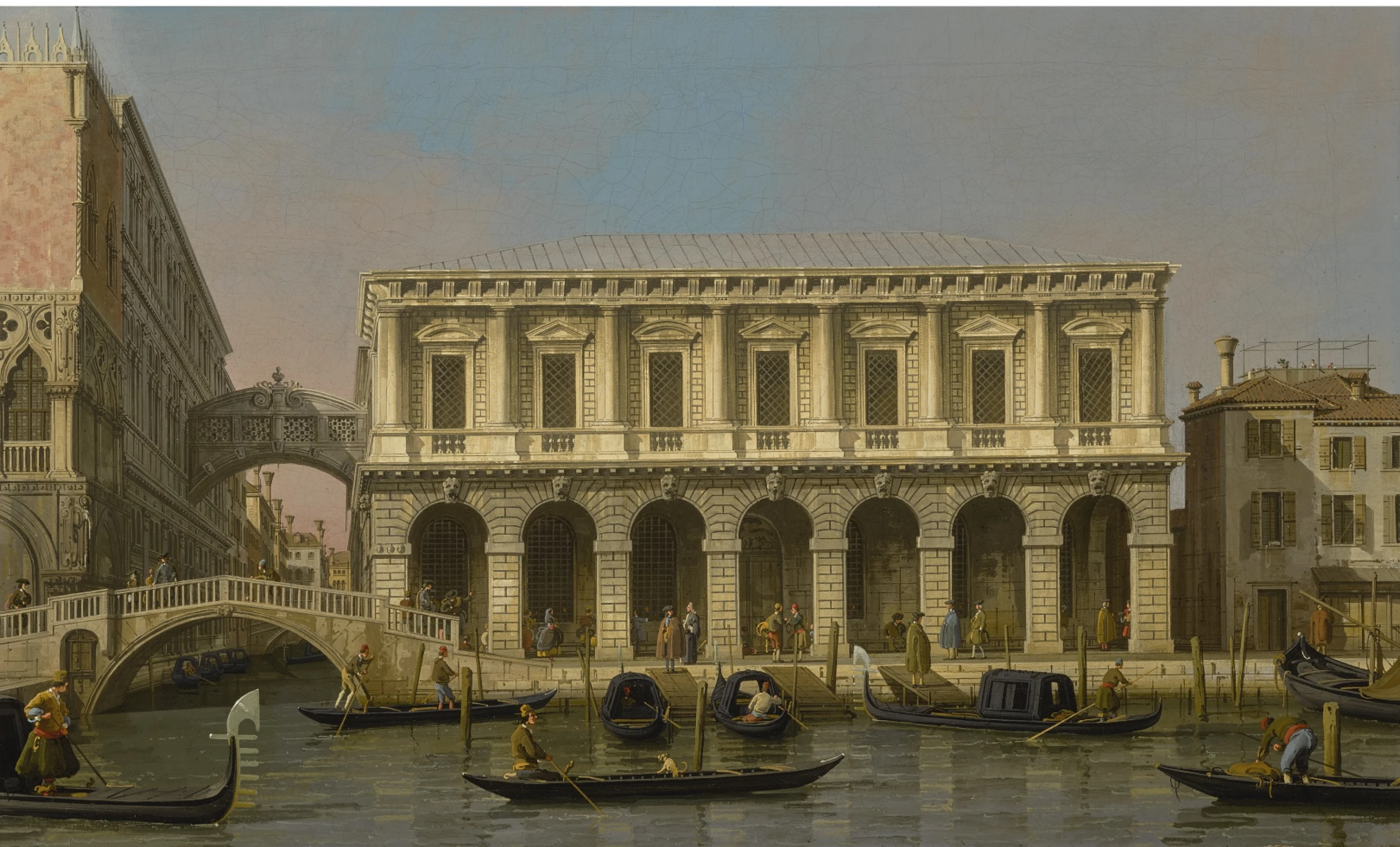
Canaletto, Venice, the prisons and the Bridge of Sighs, looking Northwest from the balcony, 18th ct.

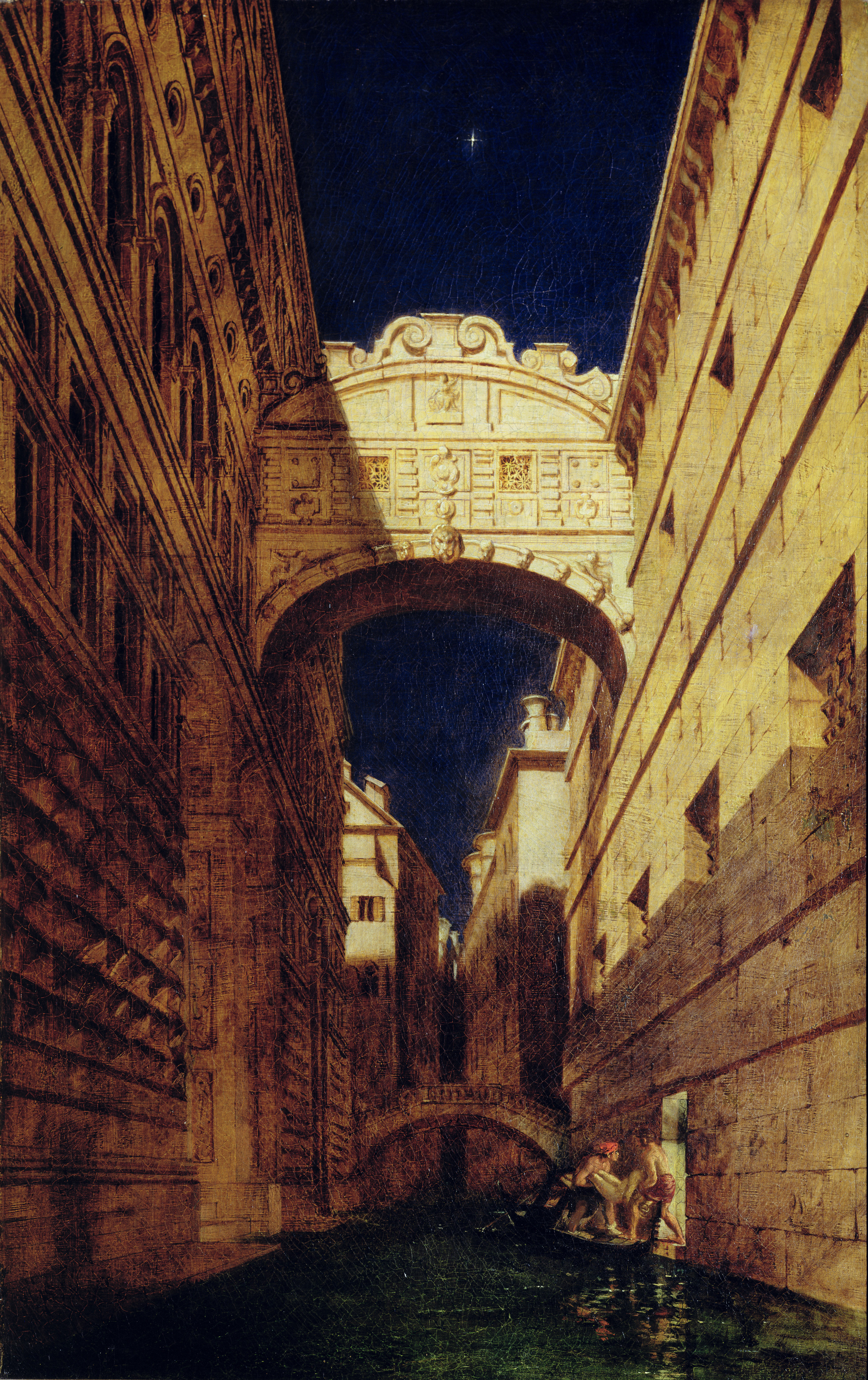
The Bridge of Sighs by William Etty, 1835

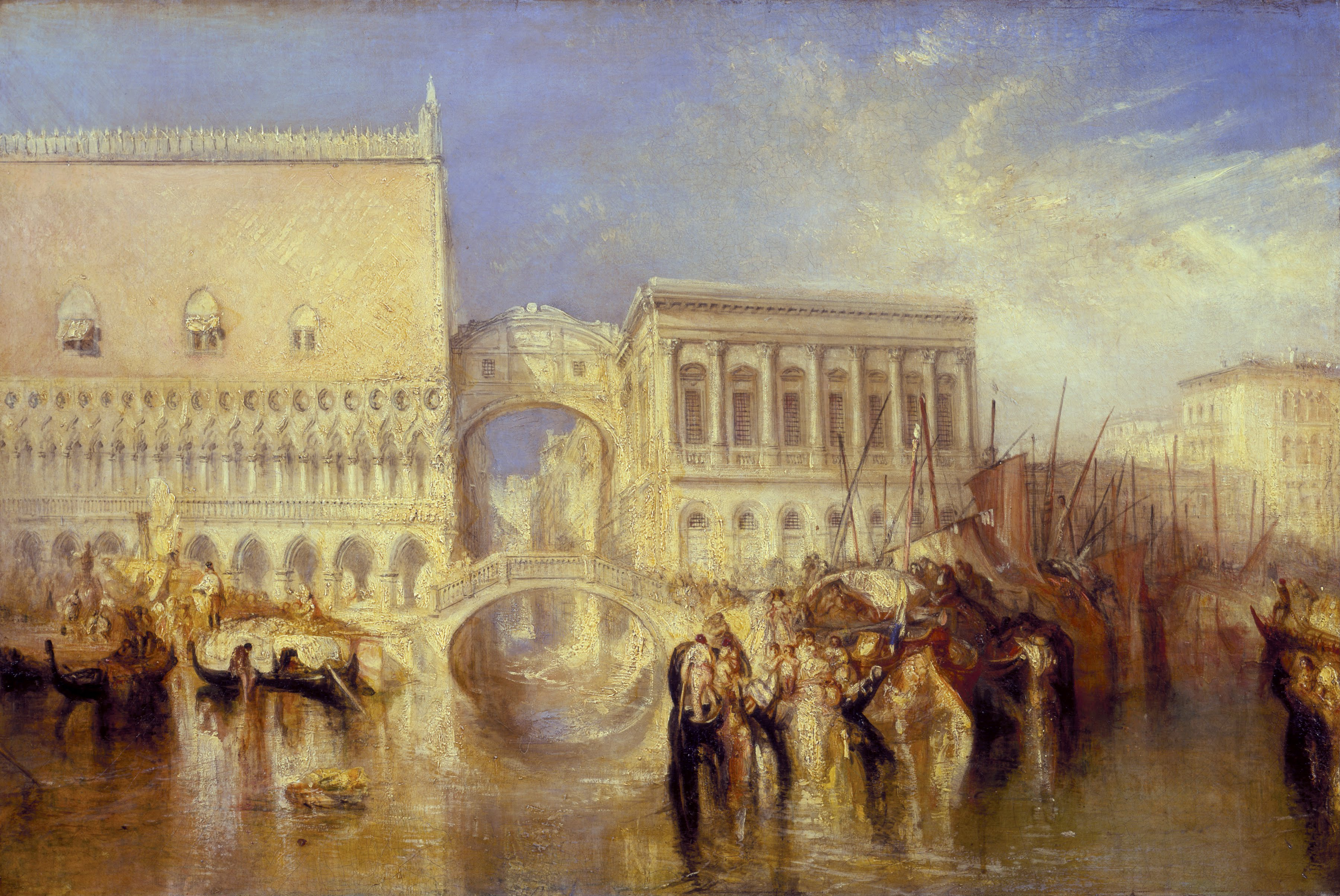
Venice, the Bridge of Sighs by J.M.W. Turner, 1840

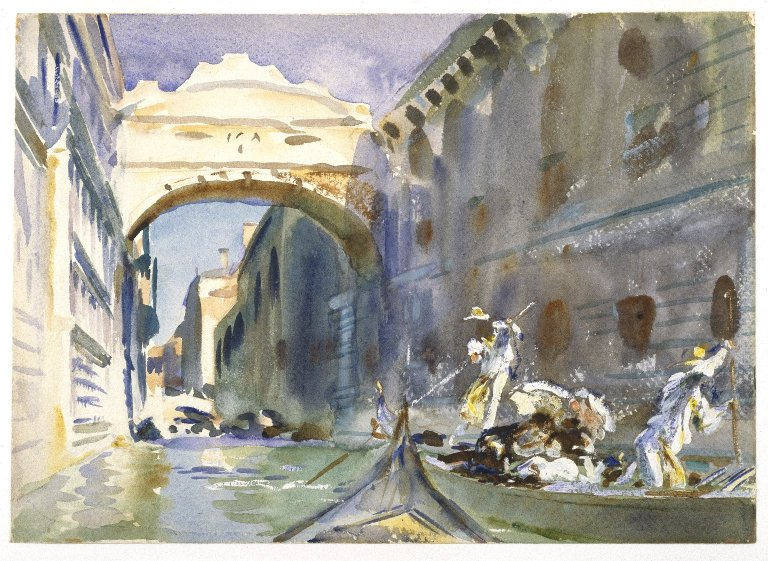
John Singer Sargent watercolor, 1905–08
Copies called the Bridge of Sighs

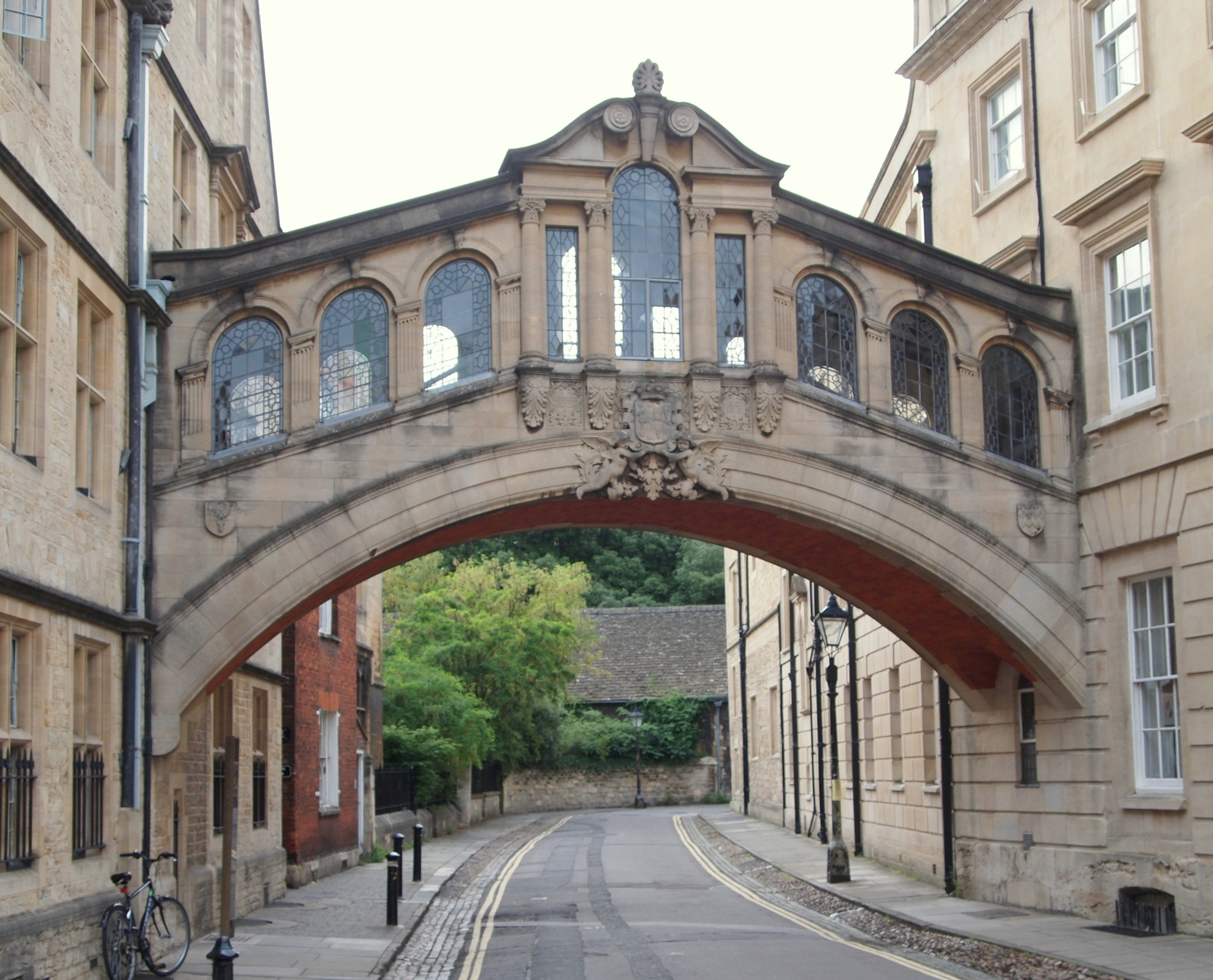
Bridge of Sighs, Oxford, England

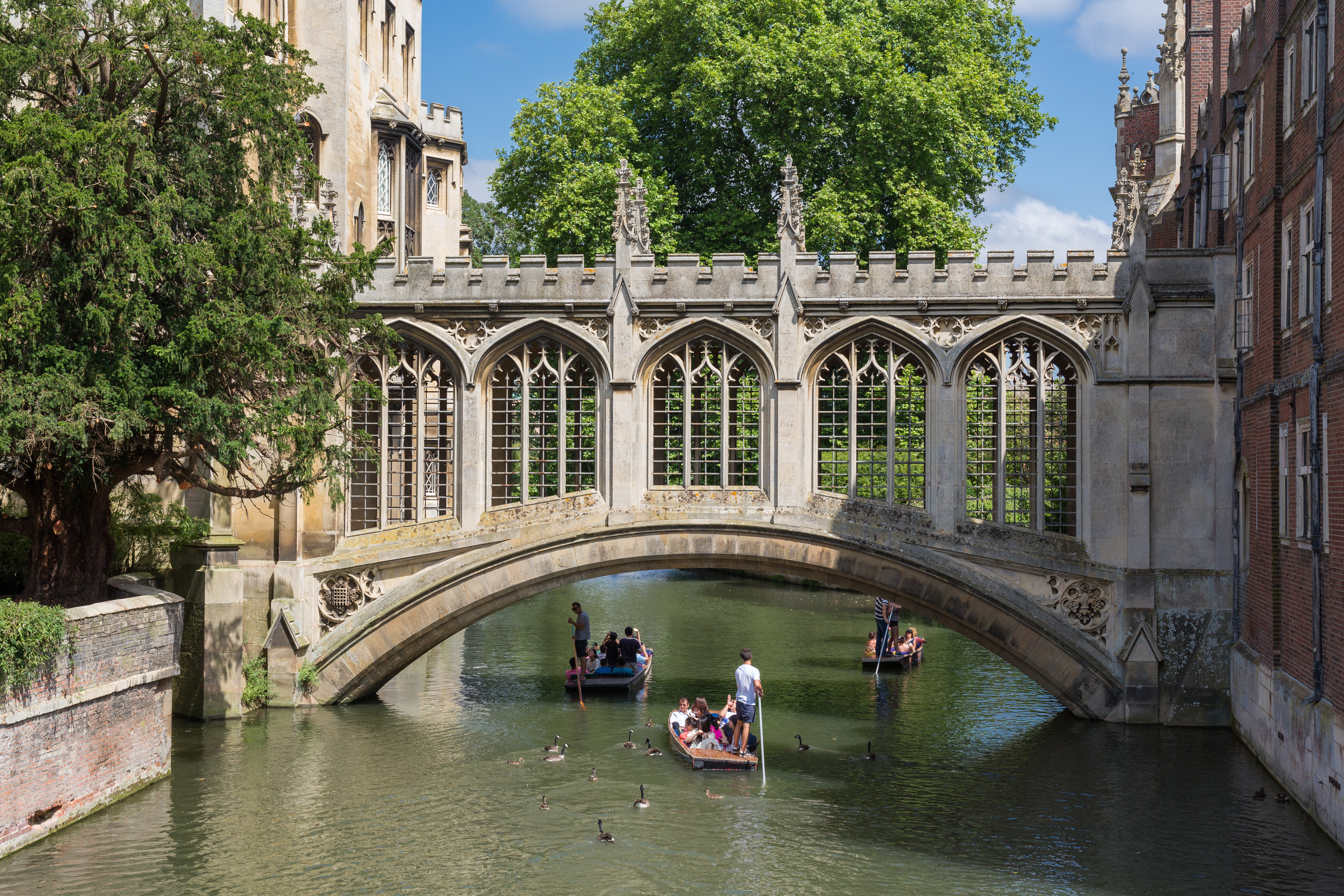
Bridge of Sighs, Cambridge, England

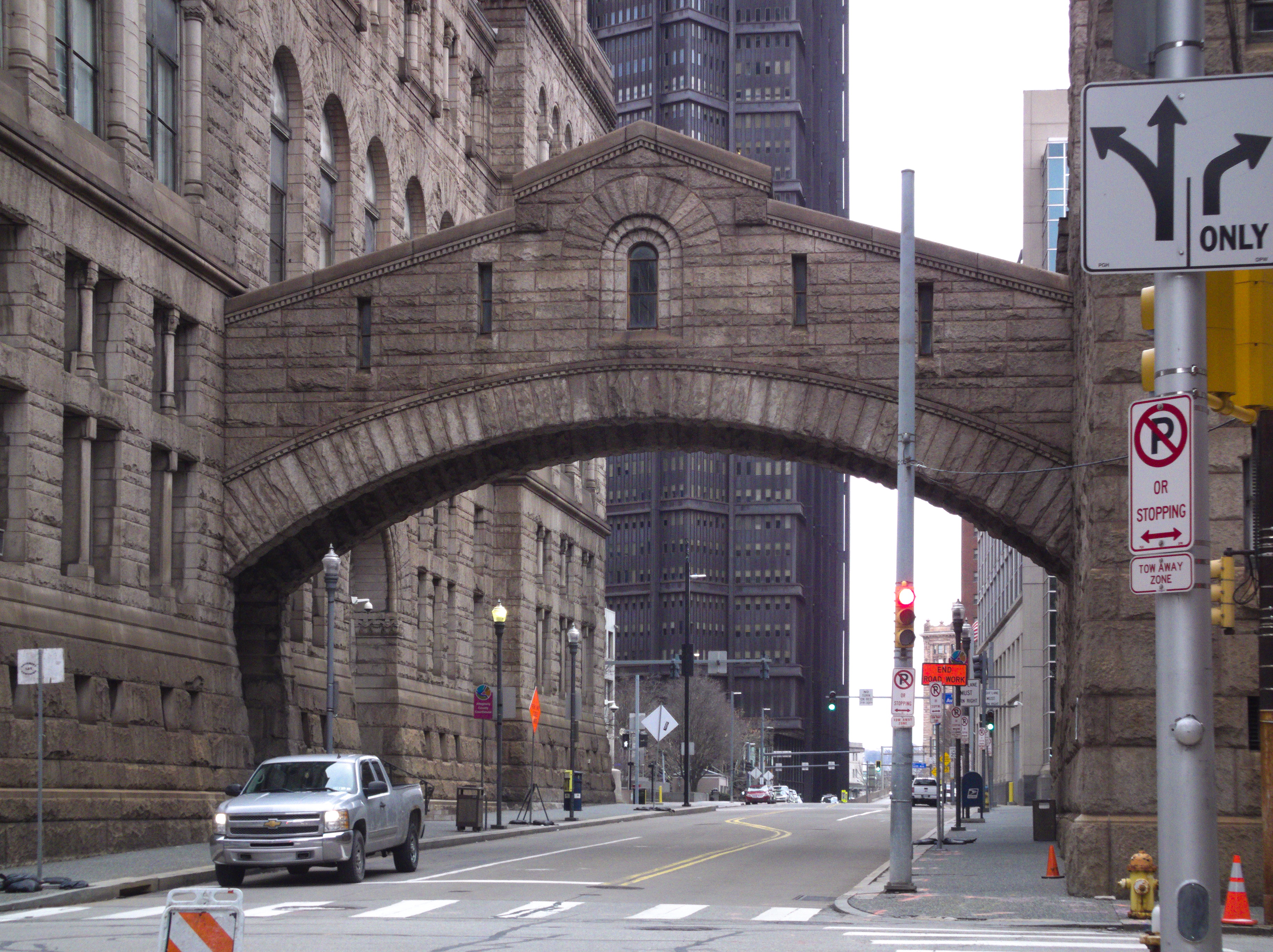
Bridge of Sighs, Pittsburgh, PA

== See also ==
- Bridge of Lies
- Room of Tears – Area in the Vatican's Sistine Chapel
- List of buildings and structures in Venice
- History of the Doge's Palace in Venice

| Preceded by Venetian Arsenal | Venice landmarks Bridge of Sighs | Succeeded by Ca' d'Oro |
