= Monument to Victor Emmanuel II =

Monument in Venice

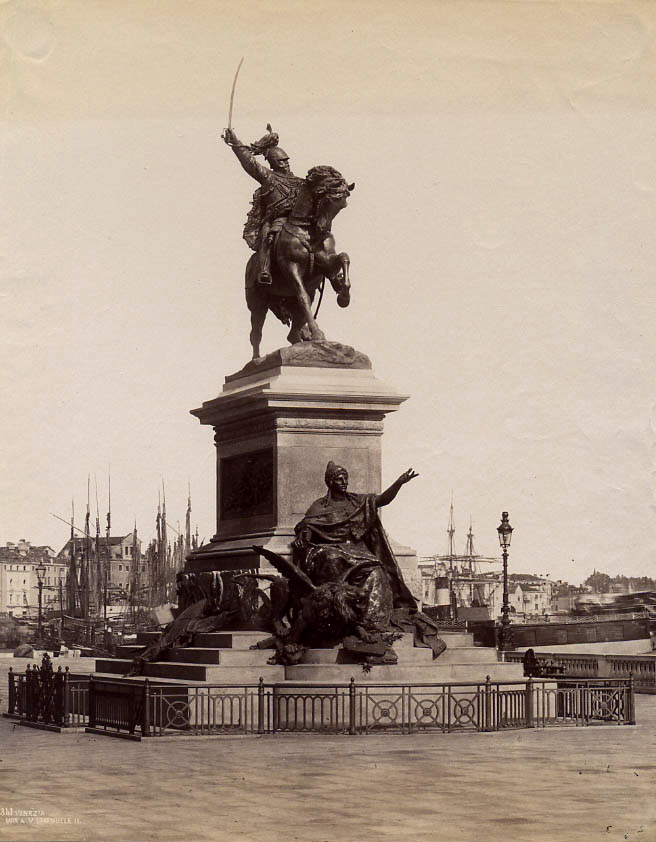
- The monument in about 1888
- Interactive map of Monument to Victor Emmanuel II
- Location: Riva degli Schiavoni, Venice
- Coordinates: 45°26′2″N 12°20′35″E
- Designer: Ettore Ferrari
- Type: sculpture
- Material: bronze, pink Baveno granite, Istrian stone
- Length: 684
- Width: 525
- Height: 1000
- Beginning date: 1887

The Monument to Victor Emmanuel II, known by the Venetians simply as the monument, located in Riva degli Schiavoni, in Castello, Venice, Italy. It is an equestrian statue made in 1887 by the Roman sculptor Ettore Ferrari.

The bronze statue was made in 1887, to commemorate the tenth anniversary of the death of Vittorio Emanuele II (1820–1878), first king of the Kingdom of Italy.

== History ==
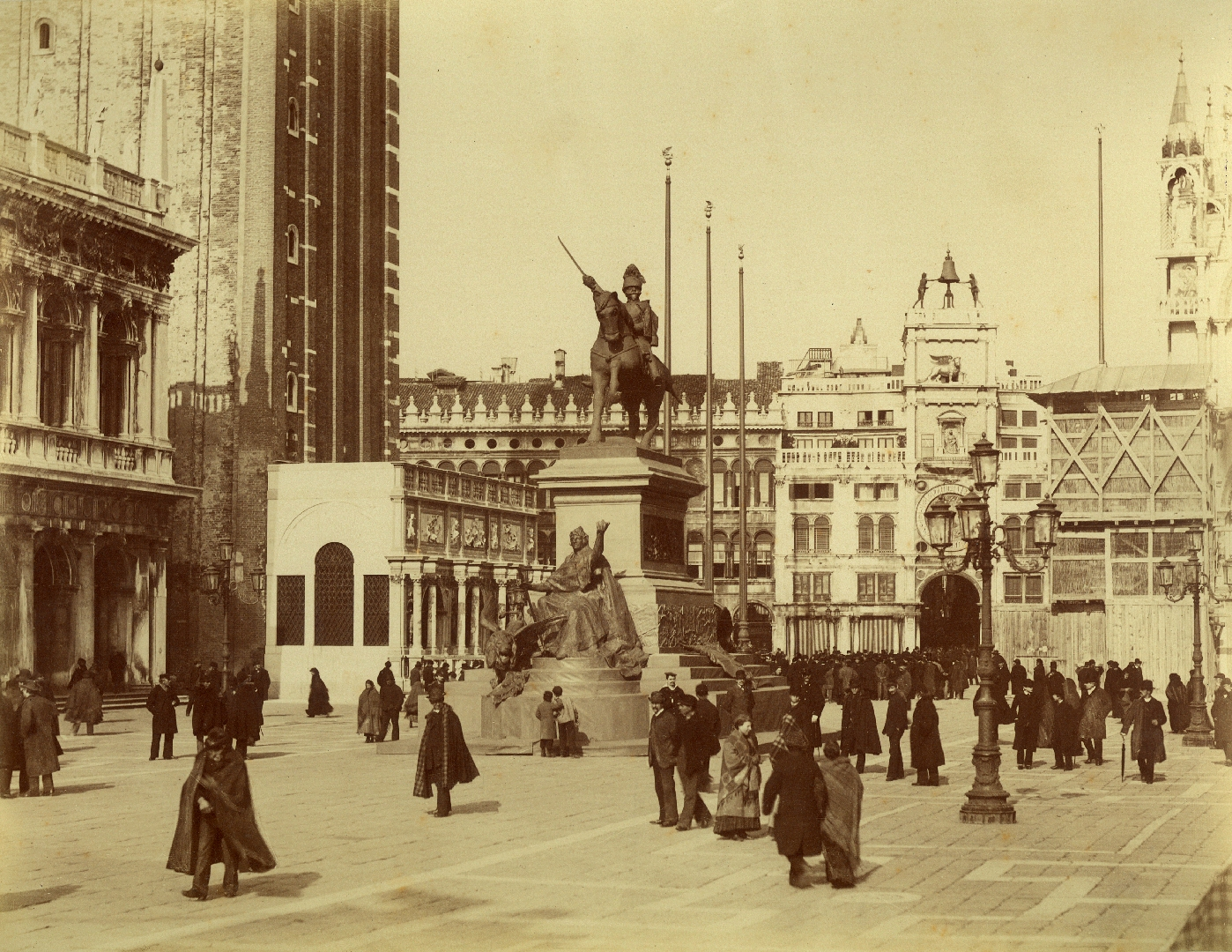
The monument to Vittorio Emanuele II in Venice (1887)

In December 1878 a committee was set up in Venice to commemorate King Vittorio Emanuele II, who had recently died. Following a competition, the announcement of which was published in September of the following year, and in which many artists participated (for a total of 48 sketches), the work of the Roman sculptor Ettore Ferrari was chosen. On 14 August 1880 the work contract was signed, to be concluded within three years.

Before being definitively placed in Riva degli Schiavoni, a copy of the sculpture was placed on trial for a few months in several places, including piazzetta dei Leoncini, piazzetta San Marco and near the Palazzo Ducale, from the side of the basin of San Marco. However, the temporary location of the monument was considered out of context and it was decided to install it in front of the luxury hotels of Riva degli Schiavoni, near the stop of the vaporetto "San Zaccaria", where it is still today.

The monument was inaugurated on May 1, 1887, in the presence of King Umberto I and Queen Margherita of Savoy.

In 2011, on the occasion of the celebrations of the 150th anniversary of the unification of Italy, the monument was restored.

== Description ==
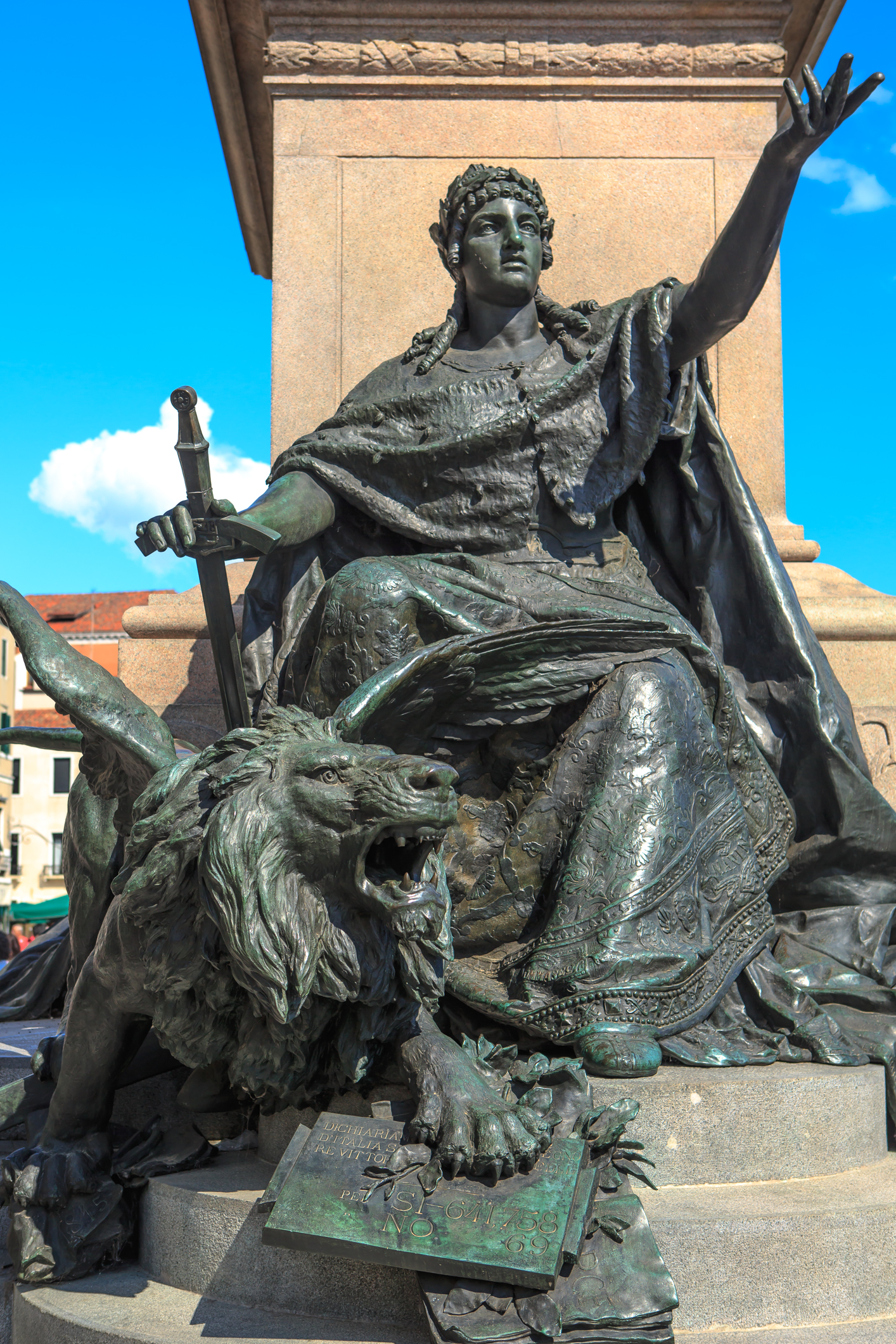
Detail of the Monument to Vittorio Emanuele II: Venice triumphant

The equestrian statue, cast by Alessandro Nelli, is placed on top of a base in pink Baveno granite and stone of Istria and depicts Vittorio Emanuele II on horseback with a drawn sword in his hand, while inciting battle.

At the foot of the monument, in a frontal position, lie two allegories of the city. On the back there is the seated female figure of "Subjugated Venice", battered and prisoner following the defeat suffered by the young Republic of San Marco (1848–1849), holding a broken sword and at the feet a Marcian lion biting the chains imposed by Austria. On the front, there is the personification of "Venice triumphant", this time proud of its regained freedom, with its left arm stretched forward and a sword at rest in its right hand, flanked by a roaring Marcian lion who, while tears up the treaty of Vienna of 1815, places its left forepaw on a plaque with the electoral results of the plebiscite of the Veneto of 1866 (641,758 votes for yes and 69 votes for no), placed in turn on the book with the traditional inscription "Pax Tibi Marce/Evangelista Meus".

On the sides of the pink granite pedestal, on the long side, two lateral high reliefs are two scenes risorgimento. On the one hand the famous battle of Palestro, fought on 30 and 31 May 1859, during the second war of Italian independence, the first victory of the Franco-Piedmontese army over the Austrian troops; the Crusader shield of House of Savoy is placed on the steps below; On the opposite side is the triumphal entry of Vittorio Emanuele II into Venice finally freed from the Austrian rule, which took place on November 7, 1866, following the Veneto plebiscite of October 21–22, 1866. On the steps below is a shield with the symbols of Rome (a capitolian she-wolf and the initials SPQR).

The whole monument is surrounded by a low bronze gate, with symbolic military ornaments, and a particular interweaving of rifles and swords in the side balustrade.

== See also ==
- List of public art in Venice
