= Ponte della Paglia =

Coordinates: 45.4336°N 12.3410°E

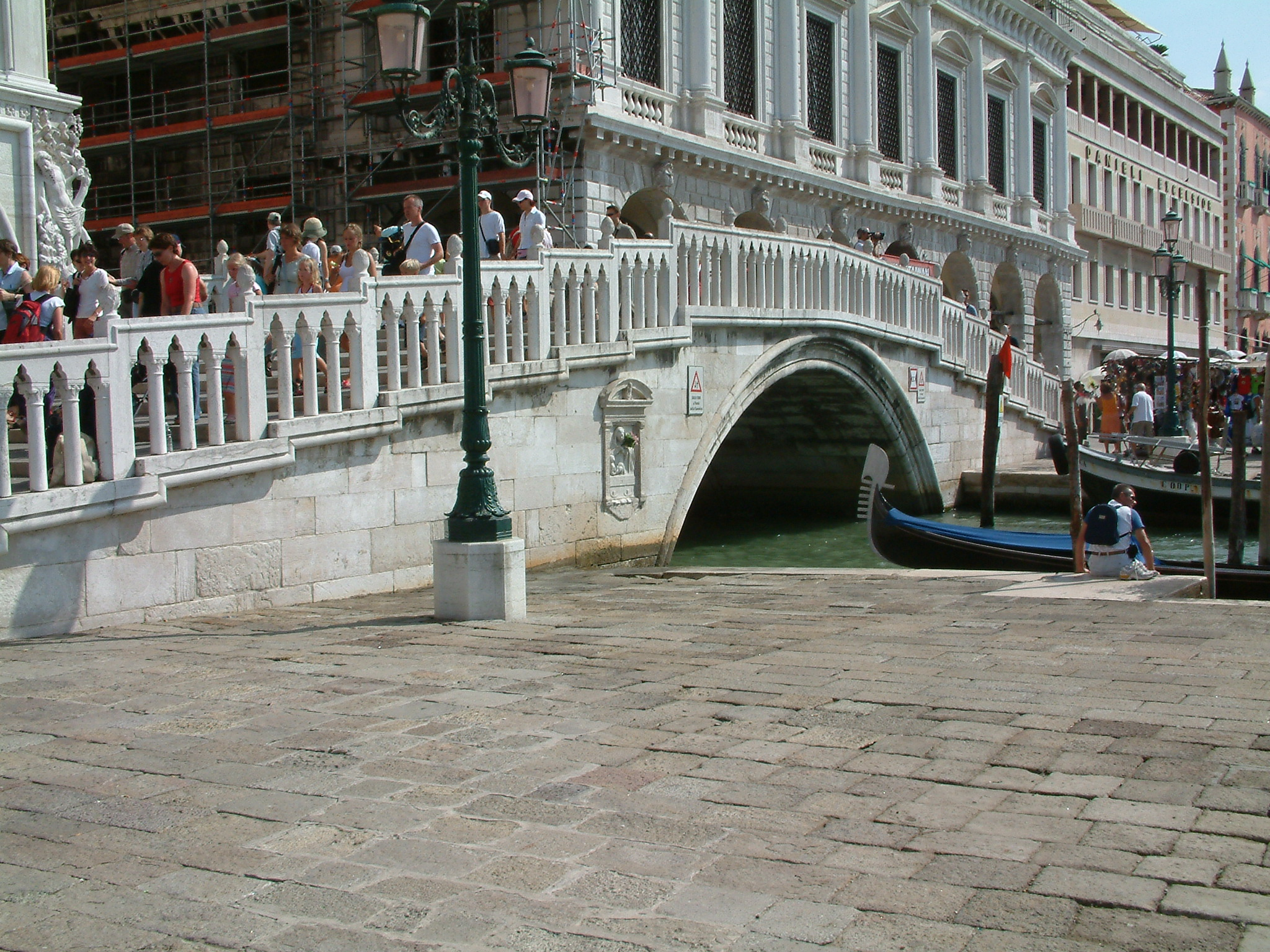
Ponte della Paglia

Ponte della Paglia is a bridge in Venice, Italy. The current structure dates from 1847, and the original structure was built in 1360. The original structure was the oldest stone bridge in Venice. The name of the bridge is understood to come from boats mooring nearby to offload straw (paglia). The bridge is a common place from which to view the Bridge of Sighs.

== In popular culture ==
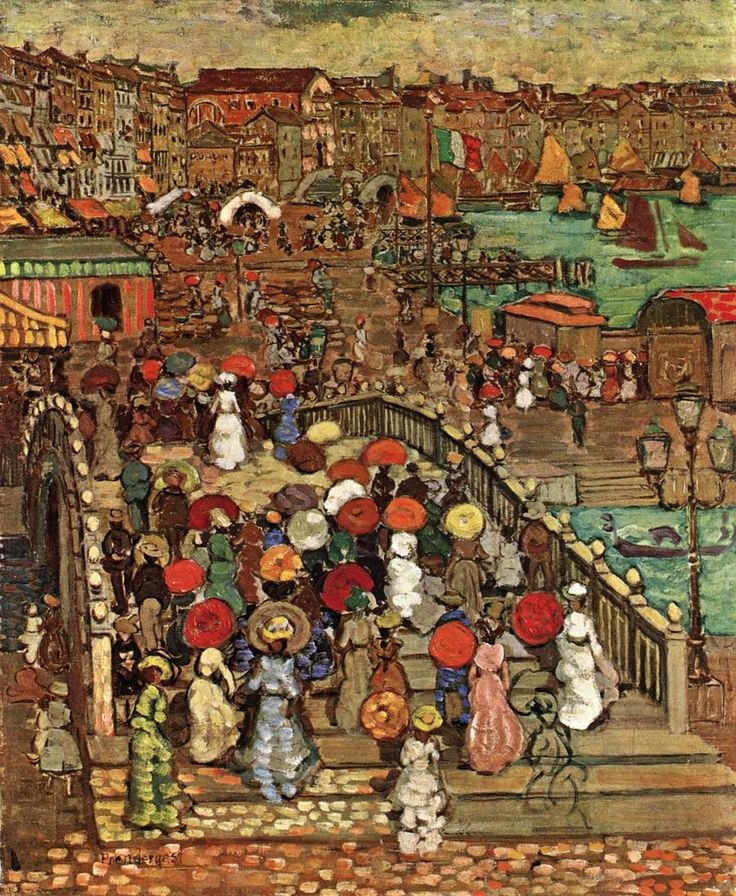
Ponte della Paglia by Maurice Prendergast

The bridge is the subject of a painting by Maurice Prendergast, the original artwork being part of the Phillips Collection. Casanova references the bridge in his memoirs as a place where he meets a woman whose life he had saved before.
