= The Bridge of Sighs (painting) =

Painting by William Etty

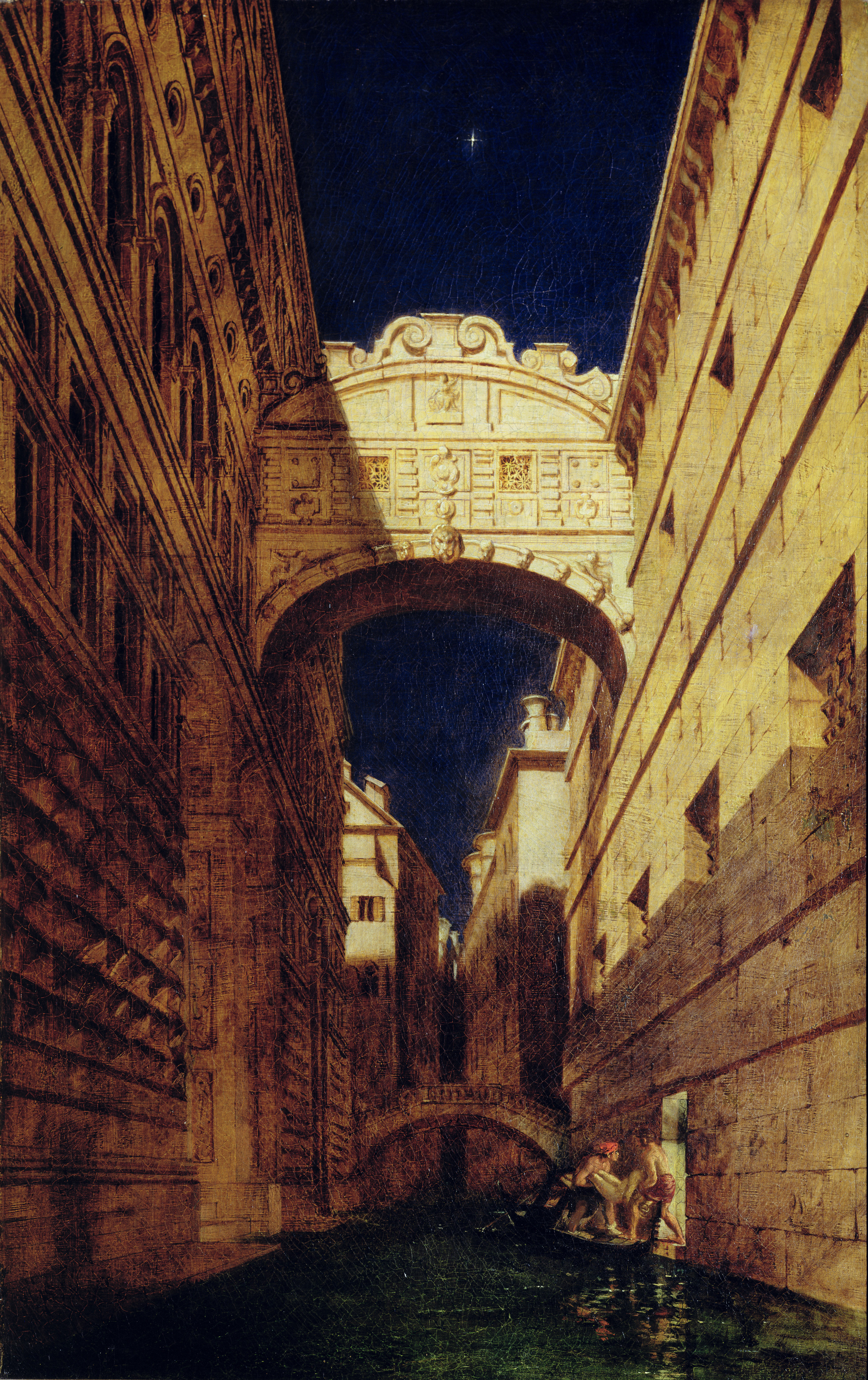
- Artist: William Etty
- Year: 1835
- Type: Oil on canvas, cityscape painting
- Dimensions: 77.5 cm × 50 cm (30.5 in × 20 in)
- Location: York Art Gallery, Yorkshire

The Bridge of Sighs is an 1835 oil painting by the British artist William Etty. It depicts the Bridge of Sighs in Venice at night. On the right two figures are about to dump a dead body into the Rio di Palazzo canal. Etty drew inspiration from Lord Byron's description of the bridge.

Etty began the picture in 1833, based on sketches he had made while visiting Venice.. The painting was displayed at the Royal Academy Exhibition of 1835 at Somerset House in London one of eight submissions by Etty. Today the work is in the collection of the York Art Gallery in Etty's native city, having been acquired in 1948.

== Bibliography ==
- Plant, Margaret. Venice: Fragile City, 1797-1997. Yale University Press, 2002.
- Robinson, Leonard. William Etty: The Life and Art. McFarland, 2007.
