= Bridge of Sighs, Cambridge =

Bridge of Sighs
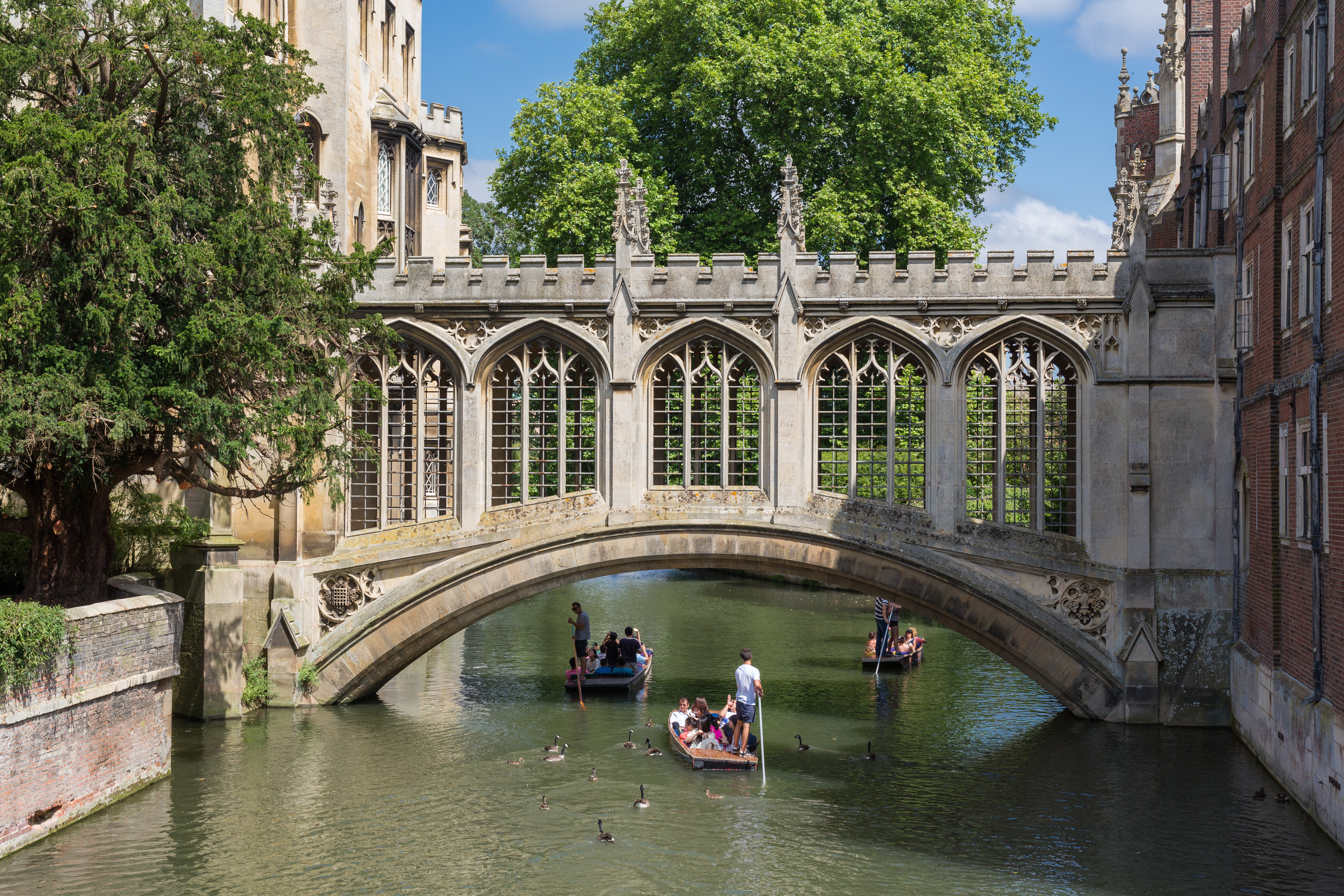
- View of the bridge taken from the Kitchen Bridge in 2014
- Coordinates: 52°12′30.33″N 000°06′56.76″E
- Crosses: River Cam
- Locale: St John's College, Cambridge, Cambridge, United Kingdom
- Official name: New Court Bridge
- Preceded by: Kitchen Bridge
- Followed by: Magdalene Bridge

Characteristics
- Design: Covered arch bridge
- Material: Stone
- No. of spans: One

History
- Architect: Henry Hutchinson
- Construction end: 1831

Location
- Location in Cambridge

The Bridge of Sighs in Cambridge, England is a stone covered bridge at St John's College, Cambridge, England. It was built in 1831 and crosses the River Cam between the college's Third Court and New Court. The architect was Henry Hutchinson. It is named after the Bridge of Sighs in Venice, although they have little architecturally in common beyond the fact that they are both covered bridges with arched bases. The bridge, a Grade I listed building, is a Cambridge attraction and Queen Victoria is said to have loved it more than any other spot in the city.

== History ==
In the early 19th century, St. John's College added accommodation on the west side of the River Cam, an area known as the Backs, with the construction of New Court. The new buildings and the bridge linking them with the original college buildings were designed in 1827 by Henry Hutchinson in the fashionable Gothic Revival style. Construction was completed in 1831, shortly before his death.

On two occasions, students have pulled the prank of dangling a car under the bridge. In the first incident (in June 1963), a 1928 Austin 7 was punted down the river using four punts that had been lashed together, then hoisted up under the bridge using ropes. The second incident (in 1968) a Bond or Reliant Regal three-wheeler car was dangled under the bridge. In neither case was the bridge damaged. The bridge was a favourite spot of former Singaporean Prime Minister Lee Kuan Yew, who had photos taken there in 1947 when he was a student, upon Lee Hsien Loong's graduation in 1974 and in 2000.

== In popular culture ==
The bridge was a filming location for Elizabeth: The Golden Age in 2007 and The Theory of Everything in 2014. The bridge can also be seen in the music video for the song "High Hopes" by Pink Floyd.

== See also ==
- Bridge of Sighs, Oxford
- List of bridges in Cambridge
