= Venice, the Bridge of Sighs =

Painting by J. M. W. Turner

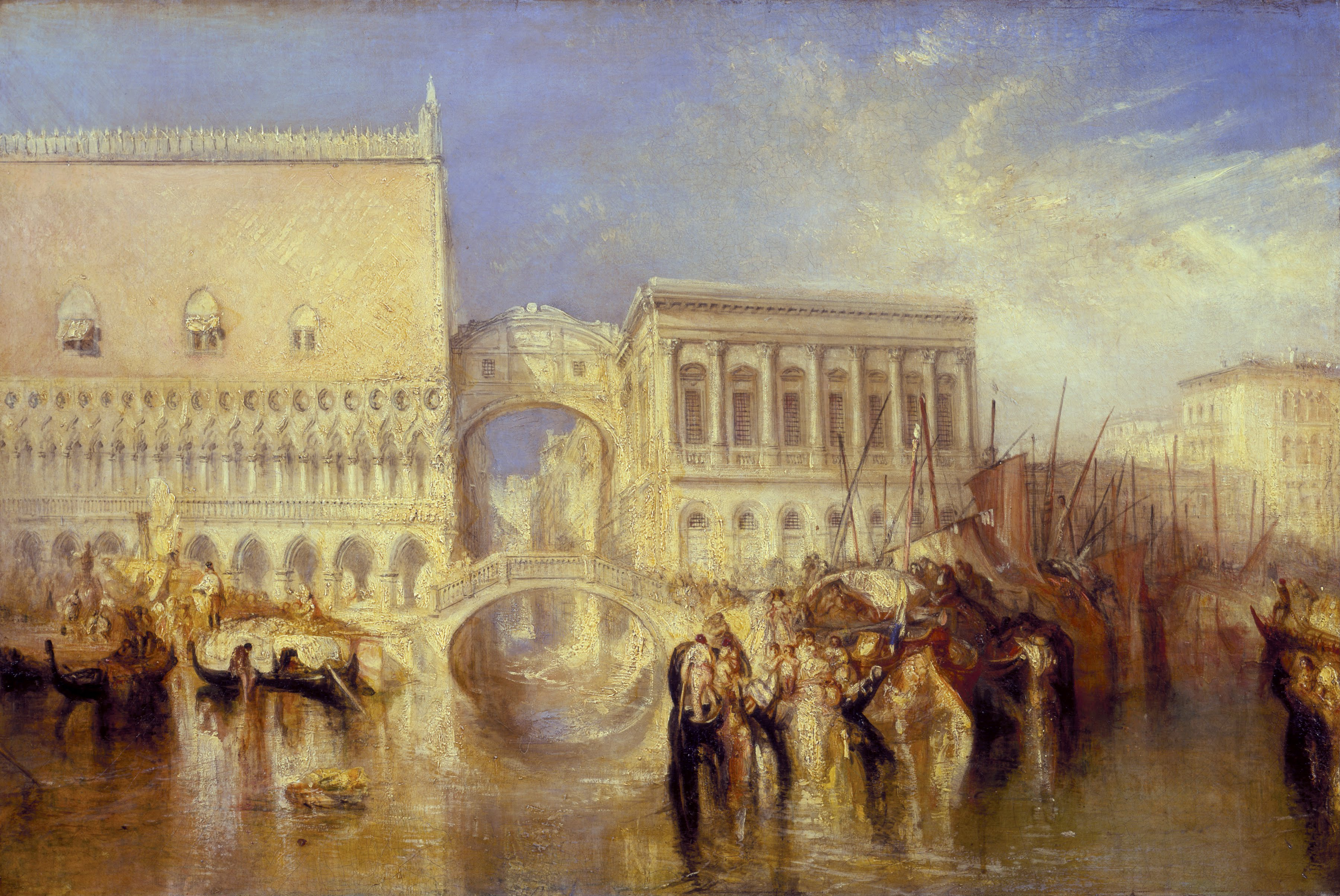
- Artist: J. M. W. Turner
- Year: 1840
- Medium: Oil on canvas
- Dimensions: 68.6 cm × 91.4 cm (27.0 in × 36.0 in)
- Location: Tate Britain, London
- Accession: N00527
- Website: tate.org.uk/art/artworks/turner-venice-the-bridge-of-sighs-n00527

Venice, the Bridge of Sighs is an 1840 cityscape painting by the English artist J.M.W. Turner. It depicts a view of Venice, then part of the Austrian Empire, looking towards the famous Bridge of Sighs. The Doge's Palace and the City Prison are either side of the bridge.

He displayed the painting at the Royal Academy's Summer Exhibition in 1840. It appeared with lines from Lord Byron's Childe Harold's Pilgrimage referencing the view. All seven works Turner exhibited that year met with widespread critical derision. Nonetheless he continued to be increasingly experimental in style during his later career. The work was part of the Turner Bequest of 1856 and is now in the collection of the Tate Britain.

== See also ==
- List of paintings by J. M. W. Turner

== Bibliography ==
- Bailey, Anthony. J.M.W. Turner: Standing in the Sun. Tate Enterprises Ltd, 2013.
- Costello, Leo. J.M.W. Turner and the Subject of History. Taylor and Francis, 2017.
- Shanes, Eric. The Life and Masterworks of J.M.W. Turner. Parkstone International, 2012.
- Stainton, Lindsay. Turner's Venice. British Museum, 1985.
