= John King (Swiss-English surgeon) =

Swiss-English surgeon and artist (1766-1846)

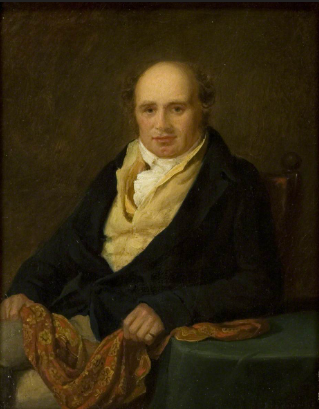
- Portrait by Edward Villiers Rippingille
- Born: July 1766; Bern, Switzerland
- Died: 18 August 1846 (aged 80); Clifton, England
- Other name: (Nicholas) Johann Koenig Johannes Rex
- Spouse: Emmeline Edgeworth
- Children: Zoe King, Psyche Emmeline (Phoebe) King, Edgeworth King, Albert Keller King
- Scientific career
- Doctoral advisors: John Abernethy

John King (1766–1846, born as Johann Koenig), was a Swiss-English surgeon, linguist, and painter who was based in Bristol, United Kingdom. He was a member of the local Bristol Philosophical and Literary Society.

== Early life and education ==
King was born in Bern, Switzerland, in July 1766. His parents were Johannes King (1738–1778) and Rosina Elisabeth Keller (c. 1741–1810), married 1765, members of the burgher class. He married Emmeline Edgeworth (sister of Maria Edgeworth). King had four children, the eldest named Zoe whom Robert Southey wrote to a friend about while Emmeline was facing childbirth complications. Two of King's children, Edgeworth King and Albert King, died before the age of 10. Only the daughters Zoe and Phoebe survived. He studied medicine under John Abernethy at St. Bartholomew's Hospital Medical College

== Career ==
King departed Switzerland, against his family's wishes, to avoid a career in ecclesiastical offices in the church. King eventually became a freemason. In the early 1790s, King worked as an engraver in London. As an artist, King is known to have sketched images of Leigh Woods as well as a print called Puss is Angry. In 1799, King was commissioned as an ensign in the Second Shropshire Regiment of Militia. In 1800, he traveled as a surgeon with Tom Wedgwood to the West Indies.

By 1799, King was in Bristol and eventually became the physiological superintendent in the Pneumatic Institution with Thomas Beddoes, Thomas De Quincey, Humphry Davy and others. He supported a variety of experiments on factitious airs, galvanism, and other scientific physiological studies. King was also employed at the Preventive Medical Institution in Bristol. In 1802, King traveled with Davy, and the wine merchant Charles Danvers, to Tintern Abbey along Wye Valley to perform chemical analyses at the mouth of the Severn. King later regarded his Pneumatic Institute colleague John Edmonds Stock as "a literary undertaker" based on the dull 1811 bibliographical publication Memoirs of the Life of Thomas Beddoes, with Analytical Account of his Writings.

Between 1800 and 1840, King helped develop the Bristol School of Artists (which later evolved to become the Royal West of England Academy) and maintained a role as an intermediary liaison between his friend and wealthy patron John Gibbons and the artists of Bristol. Edward Bird, Francis Danby, William West, and Edward Villiers Rippingille, Robert Southey, George Cumberland, John Eagles and Samuel Taylor Coleridge are a few of the artists and poets King closely associated with. King may have taken a fatherly mentorship role over wayward Rippingille.

Gibbon's great nephew, William, married King's younger daughter Phoebe. King was impressed with Andreas Schultz's guitar skill and arranged for his youngest daughter Zoe to have guitar lessons; Schultz dedicated a song to Zoe, It is a pleasure dear me (London, 1830), to repay the compliment to King. Although King was supportive of musicians, King disapproved of Rippingille's pursuit of the guitar attributing it to "the failure of his real genius".

Eagles wrote two articles for Felix Farley's Bristol Journal in 1829 in which Leigh Woods was transformed into an Arcadian paradise called Fairyland, in which King was named Johannes Rex, King of Fairyland.

== Death ==
John King died on August 18, 1846, in Clifton and is buried at the Arnos Vale Cemetery. His tombstone is inscribed with the following:

Having acquired extensive knowledge, Especially in the diseases to which, The human frame is liaible, (illegible) of fortune, Assistant in (illegible) the poor, Beloved by family and kindered, (illegible) friends and neighbors, Sought and consulted by strangers, And now called to receive his reward, By Him whose minister he was, Here rests from his labours, Amidst the benedictions of them all, John King. He was born at Berne in Switzerland, Of which city he was a patrician, He practiced as a surgeon at Clifton, Almost 50 years, And died there on the 18th day of August 1846, Aged 80, Also Emmeline his widow, And Daughter of RL Edgeworth Esq, of Edgeworthtown Ireland, Died London on the 31st day of December 1840, Aged 77, Also Zoe King their eldest daughter, Born at Clifton July 31st 1803, Died at Bath 27th September 1881, Know that my Redeemer liveth.

A portrait of King was painted by Edward Villiers Rippingille in 1818, and an earlier portrait was painted by Anton Hickel in 1793, watercolor portraits by Nathan Cooper Branwhite, James Sharples Jr. (son of James Sharples and Ellen Sharples); and portraits of King and Emmeline were painted by Washington Allston who credited King with saving his life. Allston's portrait of King is currently in San Francisco at the De Young Museum as part of the John D. Rockefeller III and Blanchette Ferry Rockefeller collection.
