= James Baker Pyne =

English Artist

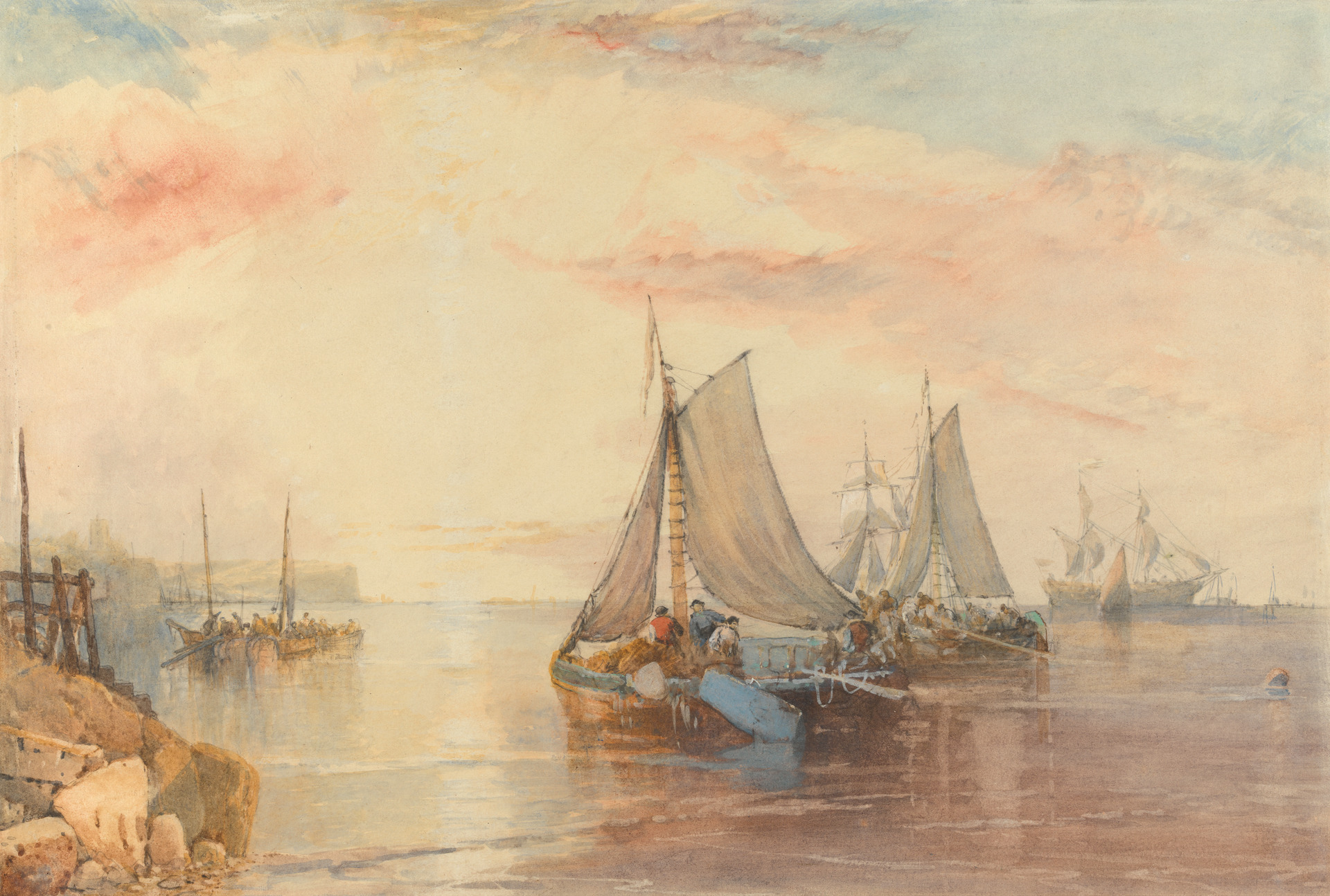
- Shipping in a Calm, watercolour
- Born: 5 December 1800; Bristol
- Died: 29 July 1870 (aged 69); London
- Known for: Landscape painting

James Baker Pyne (5 December 1800 – 29 July 1870) was an English landscape painter who became a successful follower of Turner, after having been in his earlier years a member of the Bristol School of artists and a follower of Francis Danby.

== Early life ==
Pyne was born in Bristol, England and taught himself to paint. He took part in the sketching activities of the Bristol School in the 1820s, and exhibited for the first time in Bristol in 1824. His style and subject matter, namely the atmospheric depiction of local landscapes and imaginary scenes, were those of Danby and the Bristol School, among whom he was one of the most able oil painters. Examples were Imaginary Scene (1828) and View of the Avon from Durdham Down (1829).

In 1832, after producing some oil paintings of the Bristol Riots, he spent 6 weeks in France with his fellow Bristol School artist Edward Villiers Rippingille. Pyne also seems to have participated from 1832 to 1833 in the revival of the Bristol School's sketching meetings.

== Later years ==
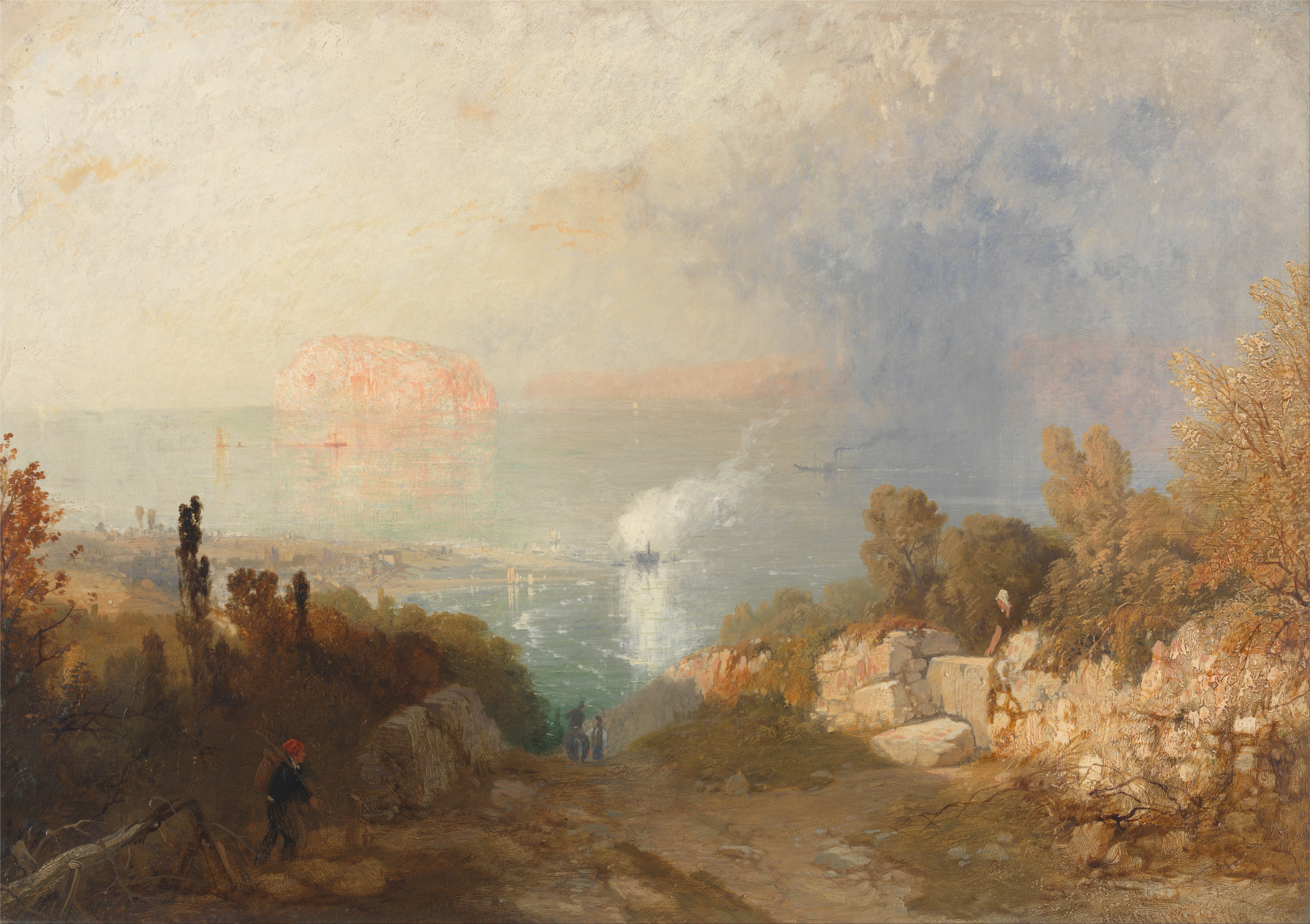
The Entrance to the Menai Straits

William James Müller had been apprenticed to Pyne during 1827–29/30. However Müller did not remain much influenced by Pyne and the other Bristol School artists. Pyne himself did not long continue in the style of Danby's "poetical" landscapes. In the mid 1830s, probably in 1835, he moved to London where he developed his mature style. His landscapes now followed Turner in their colours and style of composition. Turner's influence can be seen for example in Clifton, Near Bristol, from the Avon (1837), which was exhibited at the Royal Academy. Pyne exhibited at the British Institution during 1833–1844 at the Royal West of England Academy in Bristol, and at the Royal Academy during 1836–1841. He became Vice-President of the Society of British Artists.

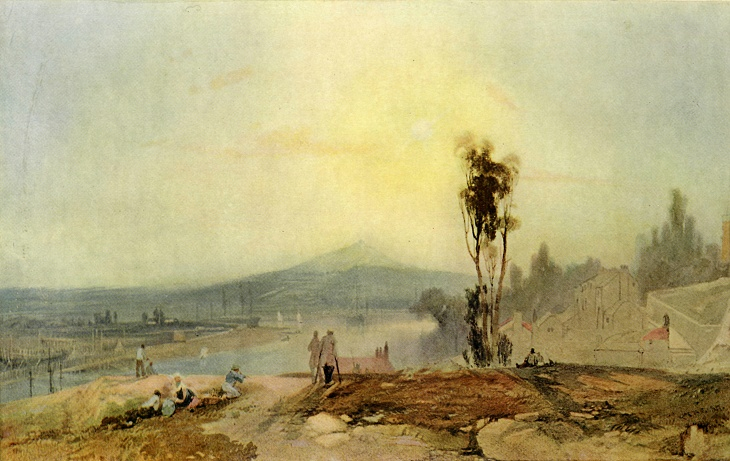
View in Italy

In 1846 he travelled to Germany, Switzerland and Italy. He often painted in the Lake District. The art dealership Thomas Agnew and Sons commissioned him to paint in the Lake District in 1848, and then in 1851 to make a three year tour of Italy, in which he was accompanied by the Bristol watercolourist William Evans.

Pyne died on 29 July 1870 at his home, 203 Camden Road, London, leaving sons James Baker Pyne, a photographer, and Charles Pyne, an artist. Besides Müller, his pupils included George Arthur Fripp and James Astbury Hammersley. He is buried with his wife Anne (1805–1865) on the western side of Highgate Cemetery. The grave (no.13995) no longer has a headstone.
