= Bristol School =

Artistic school in 19th century England

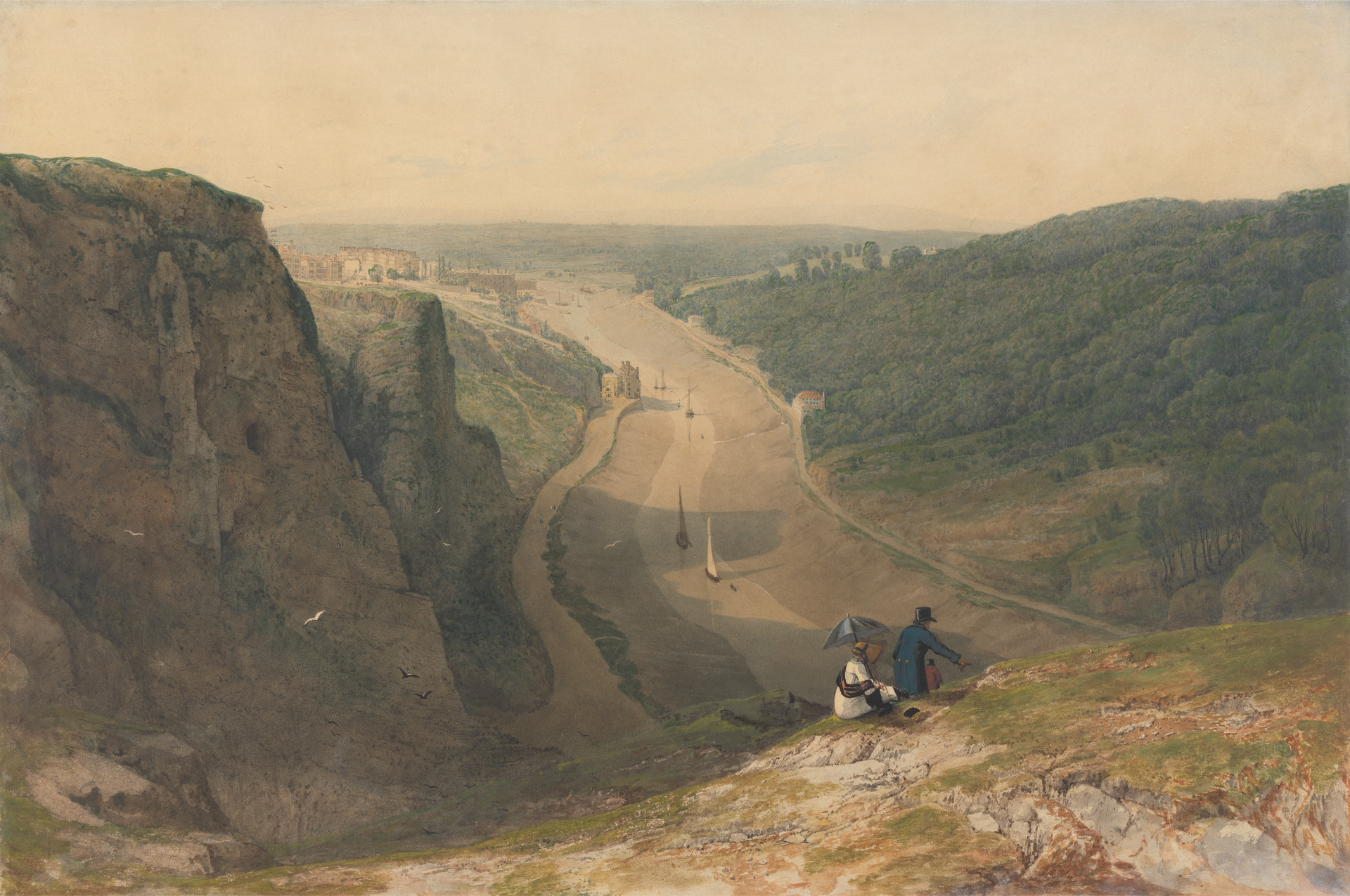
Francis Danby, The Avon Gorge, Looking toward Clifton, watercolour, c. 1820.

The Bristol School (or Bristol School of Artists) was the informal association and works of a group of artists working in Bristol, England, in the early 19th century. It was mainly active in the 1820s, although the origins and influences of the school have been traced over the wider period 1810–40. During the period of his participation in the activities of the Bristol School, Francis Danby developed the atmospheric, poetical style of landscape painting which then initiated his period of great success in London in the 1820s. The school is the institutional origin of the Royal West of England Academy.

== Formation ==
The school initially formed around Edward Bird some years before his death in 1819. Having arrived in Bristol from Ireland in 1813, Francis Danby was a participant from around 1818–19 and remained connected to the group for around a decade, although he left Bristol for London in 1824. Other artists involved were Edward Villiers Rippingille, Samuel Jackson, James Johnson, Nathan Cooper Branwhite, William West, James Baker Pyne, George Arthur Fripp and Paul Falconer Poole.

Amateur artists also participated. These included John Eagles, Francis Gold and his brother Henry, the surgeon John King and George Cumberland. Cumberland was a friend of William Blake and of many important members of the Royal Academy. Patrons of the school included the antiquarian George Weare Braikenridge and the industrialists John Gibbons, Daniel Wade Acraman and Charles Hare.

== Activities ==
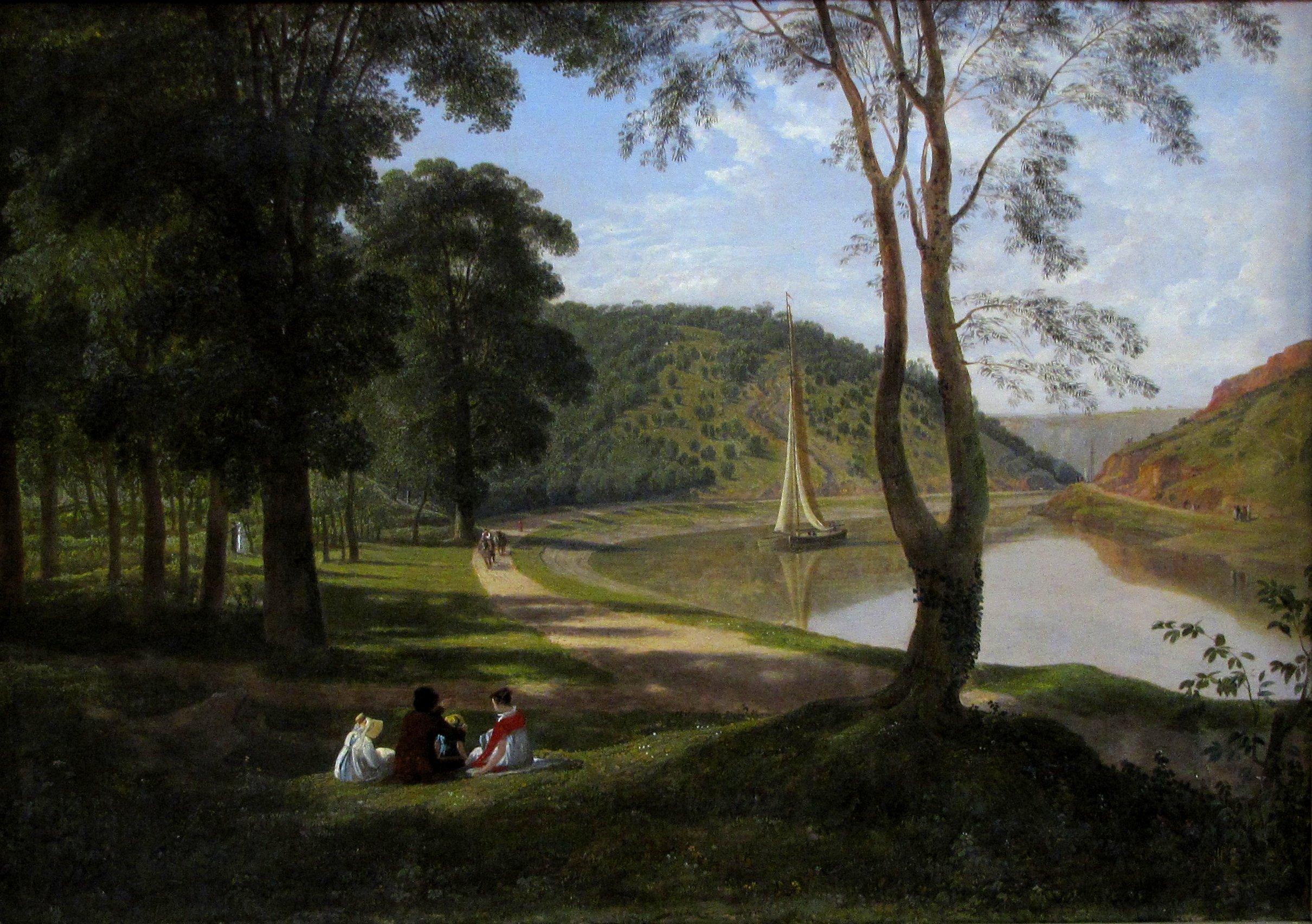
Francis Danby, View of the Avon Gorge, oil on panel, 1822.

The group conducted evening sketching meetings and sketching excursions to scenic locations around Bristol, in particular the Avon Gorge, Leigh Woods, Nightingale Valley and Stapleton Valley. Works by the group often featured these locations. A variation on this theme is The Avon Gorge from the summit of the Observatory (1834), an oil painting by West from the vantage point of his own observatory on Clifton Down. Depictions of excursions taking place in these landscapes include Danby's View of the Avon Gorge (1822), Johnson's The Entrance to Nightingale Valley (1825), and Rippingille's Sketching Party in Leigh Woods (c. 1828). Imaginary, fantasy landscapes in monochrome wash were common subjects of the evening meetings, usually taking inspiration from the Bristol scenery.

One of the most important events for the school was the first exhibition of the work of local artists at the new Bristol Institution in 1824. The organisers of this exhibition included Jackson, Johnson, Rippingille and Branwhite. The fifth organiser was a second John King, an artist and friend of Danby from Dartmouth.

There were other artists working in Bristol during this period who do not seem to have been participants in the school's activities. These included Rolinda Sharples, Samuel Colman and some of the topographical artists working for Braikenridge such as Hugh O'Neill, Thomas Leeson Scrase Rowbotham and Edward Cashin.

== Later years ==
The evening sketching meetings lasted at least until 1829, when Danby participated in one while revisiting Bristol, although other meetings by that time were not so well attended, according to Danby.

Around 1832–33 a new series of sketching meetings was started. This initially included William James Müller, Thomas Leeson Scrase Rowbotham, John Skinner Prout and Robert Tucker, according to Tucker's own account. The meetings later grew to include more artists, although relatively few surviving drawings have been identified, compared to the meetings of the 1820s, and by the 1830s the works of the Bristol School were less original. Other participants in the meetings probably included Samuel Jackson, Stephen C. Jones, James Baker Pyne, Henry Brittan Willis, W. Williams, Joseph Walter, George Arthur Fripp, Edmund Gustavus Müller, and William Evans. These sketching meetings may have lasted into the 1840s.

William James Müller's biographer Nathaniel Neal Solly described the sketching meetings as a formal club, but some commentators believe he had confused them with the formation of the Bristol Society of Artists, which held its first exhibition in 1832 at the Bristol Institution. That exhibition included numerous works by Samuel Jackson, James Johnson, Nathan Cooper Branwhite and William James Müller.

== Influence ==
Danby's atmospheric, poetical style of landscapes as initially developed within the Bristol School bore fruit in works such as An Enchanted Island, A Land of Dreams, The Naiads Isle and An Enchanted Garden. An Enchanted Island, successfully exhibited in 1825 at the British Institution and then back in Bristol at the Bristol Institution, was in turn particularly influential on other Bristol School artists.

However, the 1832 exhibition of the Bristol Society of Artists included a number of works by artists of the Norwich School: John Sell Cotman, Miles Edmund Cotman and John Berney Crome. John Sell Cotman was to prove a greater influence on the later work of William James Müller than Danby and other Bristol School artists, despite Müller's having been apprenticed to John Baker Pyne during 1827–29/30. Pyne himself in his later career did not continue in the style of Danby's poetical landscapes that he had followed in his Bristol years.
