= The Enchanted Castle (painting) =

Painting by Francis Danby

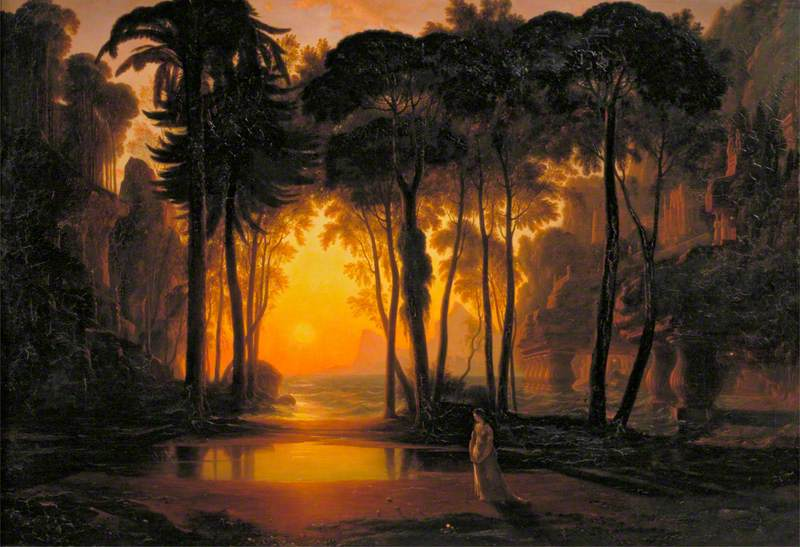
- Artist: Francis Danby
- Year: 1841
- Type: Oil on canvas, landscape painting
- Dimensions: 83.8 cm × 116.8 cm (33.0 in × 46.0 in)
- Location: Victoria and Albert Museum, London

The Enchanted Castle is an 1841 landscape painting by the Irish artist Francis Danby.

== History and description ==
It was inspired by a work by the Ancient writer Apuleius featuring Psyche and an enchanted castle.The subject had also been deployed by Claude Lorrain in his 1677 painting Landscape with Psyche Outside the Palace of Cupid.

The Wexford-born Danby was part of the Bristol School which emerged in the Regency era. He later travelled through Continental Europe and settled near Lake Geneva before returning to Britain. His work was frequently romantic in atyle.The painting was displayed at the Royal Academy Exhibition of 1841 at the National Gallery in London. It is now in the Victoria and Albert Museum in South Kensington, having been donated by the art collector John Sheepshanks as part of the Sheepshanks Gift in 1857. At one point it was misidentified as Danby's 1825 painting Calypso Grieving for her Lost Lover.

== Bibliography ==
- Greenacre, Francis. Francis Danby, 1793-1861. Tate Gallery, 1988.
- Roe, Sonia. Oil Paintings in Public Ownership in the Victoria and Albert Museum. Public Catalogue Foundation, 2008.
