= William Evans (landscape painter) =

English landscape painter

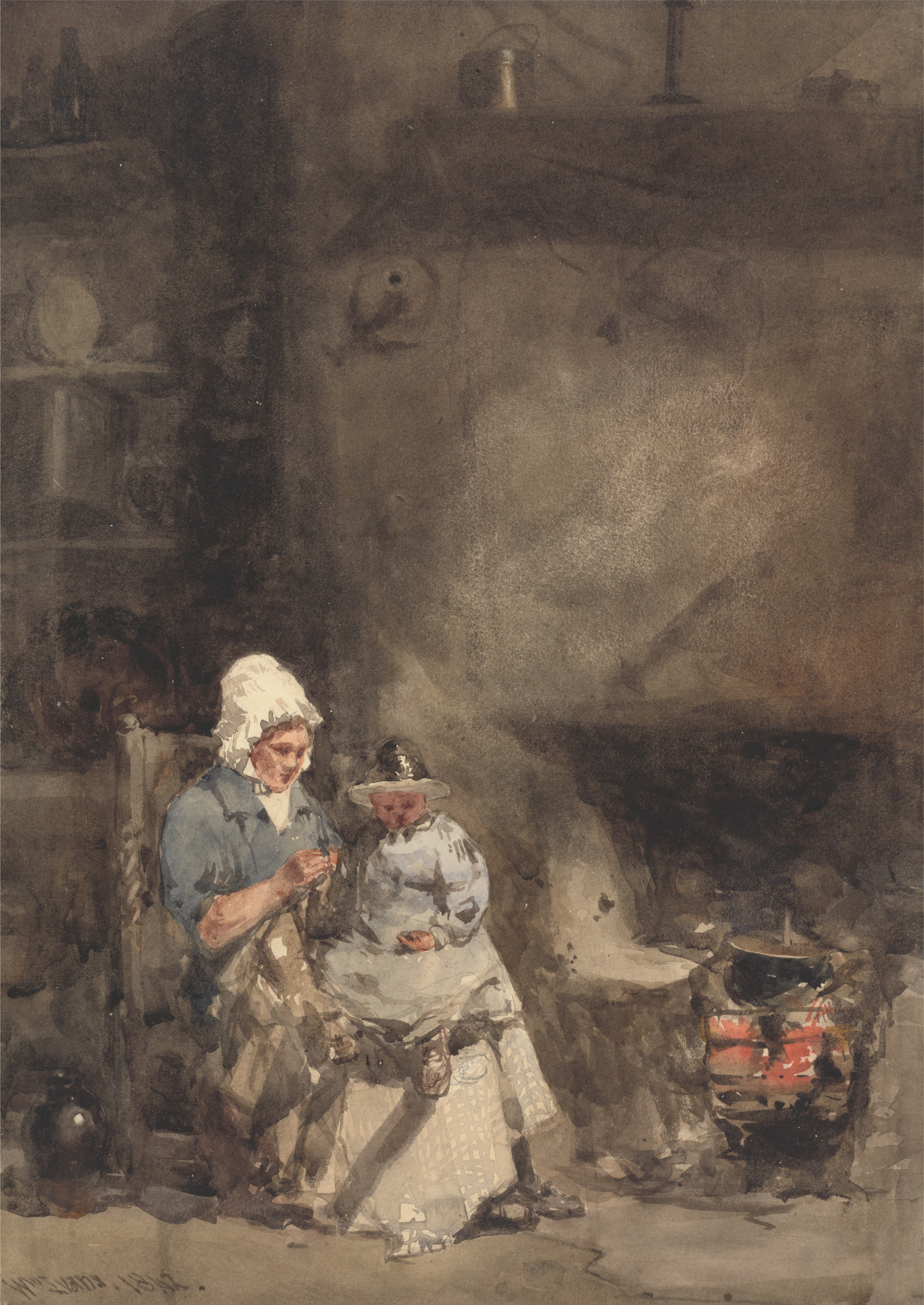
A Woman and Child by a Hearth, watercolour, 1842

William Evans (1809 – 7 December 1858) was an English landscape painter. He was an associate member of the Old Society of Painters in Water-colours, where he exhibited as William Evans of Bristol. Born in Bristol, in his early years he was a pupil of Francis Danby and associated with the artists of the Bristol School.

Wishing to perfect his art by the study of nature alone, and to free himself from the influence of schools or individuals, Evans made himself a home for many years in the centre of a grand gorge of mountain scenery in North Wales, at a farm called Tyn-y-Cai, in a large park at the junction of the River Lledr with the River Conwy, near Betws-y-Coed. Here he was able to cultivate a natural impulse for originality and grandeur in the constant contemplation of nature in some of its wildest forms, and he produced some fine works, notably Traeth Mawr; his treatment of the mountain torrents and the cottage scenery of the neighbourhood was also remarkable. William James Müller, a friend from his Bristol days, joined him in painting this area on a visit of 1842.

After 1852 Evans visited Italy, spending the winter successively at Genoa, Rome, and Naples, and he collected numerous materials for working up into landscapes of a very different character from his earlier productions.

His work was cut short by illness, and he died in Marylebone Road, London, on 7 December 1858, aged 49. There is a fine water-colour drawing by him in the print room at the British Museum.
