= Thomas Danby (artist) =

English painter

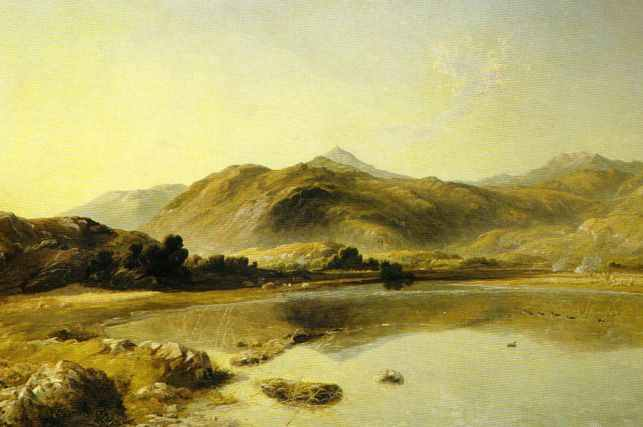
A view of the Moel Siabod (1847, oil on canvas)

Thomas Danby (c. 1818 – 25 March 1886) was a British landscape painter.

Danby was born, it is thought, in Bristol in south-west England, the younger son of Francis Danby (1793-1861). He had an elder brother, James Francis Danby (1816–75) who also became a landscape painter. Thomas went with his father to Europe in 1829, living for a time in Paris where he was able to earn a living by copying pictures at the Louvre in Paris. He thus became an earnest admirer and "student" of Claude Lorrain, whose aerial effects he sought to imitate.

Returning to England about the same time as his father, he first exhibited at the British Institution in 1841, and afterwards frequently at the Royal Academy from 1843. He was a friend of Paul Falconer Poole, with whom he shared a house in Hampstead in 1843, and imbibed not a little of his romantic feeling for nature. From 1855 to his death, Danby resided in or near Hampstead in north London..

The subjects of his landscapes were usually taken from Welsh scenery, especially the old county of Merioneth; his pictures for the most part were not ideal compositions (unlike his father's work) but actual scenes pervaded with a true romantic spirit. "He was always trying" says the writer of his obituary in The Times newspaper, "to render his inner heart's feeling of a beautiful view rather than the local facts received on the retina."

He came, it is said, within one vote of election as an Associate of the Royal Academy (ARA) but, failing eventually to attain Academy honours, he devoted himself in his latter years chiefly to watercolour painting. He became a member of the Royal Hibernian Academy in 1860, an associate of the Society of Painters in Watercolours in 1867, and a full member of the latter in 1870; until his death his contributions were prominent amongst the works at the society's exhibitions.

Danby died of a chest complaint, terminating in dropsy on 25 March 1886. He had been twice married, and had 2 daughters and a son from the second marriage.

His remaining works, some 200 watercolours and an equal number of oil paintings, were sold at Christie's in London on the 17–18 June 1886.
