= Christopher Moore (sculptor) =

Irish-born sculptor

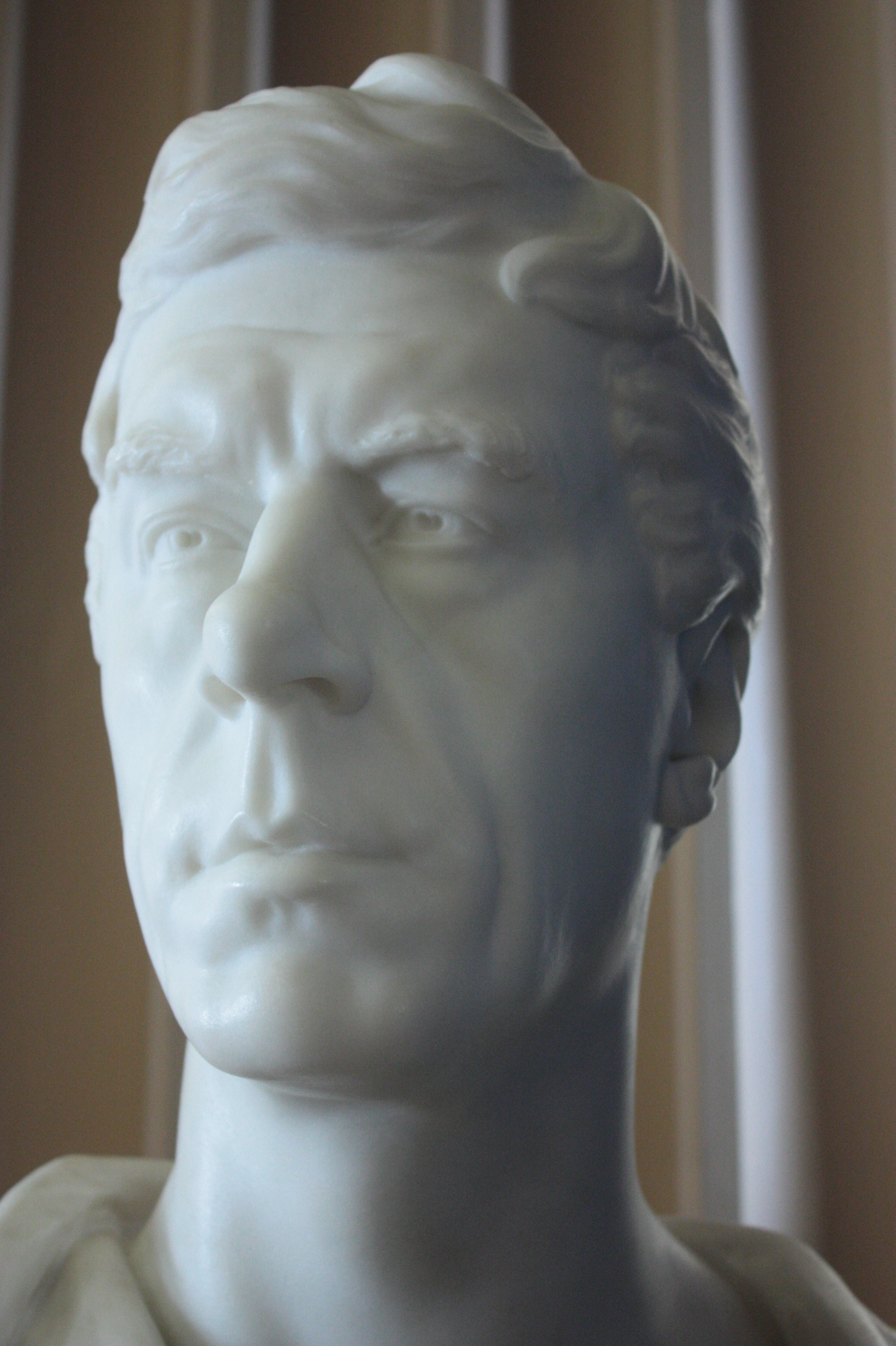
Bust of Henry Brougham, Lord Brougham, by Christopher Moore, Old College, University of Edinburgh

Christopher Moore RHA MRIA MRHA (1790–1863) was an Irish-born sculptor operational mainly in England in the 19th century.

== Life ==
He was born in Dublin in 1790. In 1819 he is listed as living at 2 Upper Gloucester Place, still in Dublin, but moved to London in 1820, aged 30, where he began exhibiting at the Royal Academy and in Brighton. In 1821 he was living and working on Tottenham Court Road. In 1829 he moved to 23 Howland Street.

He set up permanent residence in London in 1821, but made frequent returns to Ireland. He exhibited in the Royal Academy 1821–1860 and at the British Institution 1821–1834. He exhibited at the Royal Hibernian Society from 1829 to 1861.

He died in Dorset Street, Dublin, on 17 March 1863. He is buried in Glasnevin Cemetery in Dublin.

His portrait, by John Doyle, is held by the National Gallery of Ireland.

== Known works ==
see

- Combat between the Archangel Michael and Satan, pre-1820
- Bust of Henry Grattan, 1821
- Bust of Charles Phillips, barrister, 1821
- General Sir John Doyle, 1822
- Bust of Miss Grace Croft, 1823
- Bust of Lord Nugent, 1823
- Bust of Lord Denman, 1828
- Bust of the artist Francis Danby, 1828
- Bust of Daniel O'Connell, 1830
- Bust of William Mulready, 1832
- Bust of George Stephenson, 1832
- Effigy of the dead child, Isabella Cooper, in Goathurst Church, Somerset, 1835
- Bust of Solomon Cox, 1836
- Bust of T S Goodenough, 1838
- Bust of Lord Morpeth, Castle Howard, 1839
- Bust of Daniel Murray, Archbishop of Dublin, 1841
- Bust of Anne, Countess of Charlemont, Windsor Castle, 1841
- Plaster bust of Lord Plunket, Castle Howard, 1841
- Bust of Lady Dover, Castle Howard, 1842
- Bust of John Philpot Curran, St Patrick's Cathedral, Dublin, 1842 (erected 1845)
- Bust of Sir Henry Marsh, surgeon, 1843
- Bust of Thomas Moore, poet, 1843
- Bust of Sir Philip Crampton, surgeon, 1843
- General Sir Edward Blakeney, 1844
- Bust of Thomas Norton Longman, publisher, Hampstead Parish Church, 1845
- Bust of Sir Maziere Brady, 1846
- Bust of Robert Holmes, 1847
- Bust of Richard Lalor Shiel, National Gallery of Ireland, 1848
- Bust of Viscount Southwell, 1849
- Bust of Edmund Burke, formerly in Crystal Palace, 1850
- Bust of John Doyle the artist, 1850 (probably done in artistic exchange for Doyle's portrait of Moore)
- Bust of Lord Brougham, 1851
- Bust of Benjamin Guinness, 1852
- Bust of Cardinal Wiseman, 1853
- Bust of the Earl Of Derby, 1853
- Bust of George Howard, 7th Earl of Carlisle, n.d.
- Wax portrait of George Papworth, Irish National Museum, n.d.
