= Jeremiah Hodges Mulcahy =

Irish artist and art teacher

- Portrait of Mulcahy by John Joseph Slattery
- Born: 15 September 1804; Limerick, Ireland
- Died: 25 December 1889 (aged 85); Harold's Cross, Dublin
- Resting place: St John's church, Limerick
- Known for: landscape artist and teacher

Jeremiah Hodges Mulcahy (15 September 1804-25 December 1889) was an Irish artist and art teacher.

== Life and family ==
Jeremiah Hodges Mulcahy was born on 15 September 1804 in Limerick. His parents were Ellen Sheehan and James Mulcahy, but little else is known about his early life. His parents may have been from Cork, as they were married in 1802 in St Peter and Paul's church in the city. His parents appear to have been Catholic, with Mulcahy ultimately becoming a member of the Church of Ireland. As a teen, Mulcahy was taught at an art school in Limerick and was tutored by Morris O'Connor.

Mulcahy married Mary Callanane on 3 November 1833, and the couple had two children, Maria who died in infancy in 1835, and Francis (Frank), born 5 November 1836. Mary died on 11 February 1837. Frank was raised by his maternal grandmother, and emigrated to the United States where he died in the 1860s. The lived in Lock Quay, Limerick. Mulcahy married a second time, to Christina Jackson, of Killavilla, Roscrea, County Tipperary, one of his students. It is thought the couple eloped, as they married on 20 April 1853 at Gretna Hall, Gretna Green, Scotland, with Christina aged 16 and Mulcahy aged 52. He commissioned a painting of her in 1856 by John O'Keefe. The couple had 7 children, 3 of whom survived infancy, Emily, Alfred and Charley. Christina died, age 24, on 3 March 1862 just 3 months after the birth of their youngest child, also Christina. After Christina's death, Mulcahy closed his academy and moved to Dublin with his family. Their daughter Christina died in 1863.

He died at his home, 11 Avondale Terrace, Harold's Cross, on 25 December 1889. He is buried in a family vault at St John's church, St John's Square, Limerick.

== Career ==
A Landscape with Curragh Chase, County Limerick (1843)

Mulcahy is considered to be a regional artist, painting mostly landscapes which are notable for their historical and topographical content. His work shows the influence of 17th and 18th century landscape painting as well as the Romantic movement. From the 1830s onwards, his patrons were the aristocracy and gentry of Munster such as the earl and countess of Dunraven, the de Veres of Curragh Chase, the Knight of Glin, Lord Mounteagle, and John Croker of Ballinagarde. Mulcahy became a member of the Freemasons of Ireland at the Eden Lodge, Limerick in 1839, which bolstered his connections to future patrons. He travelled around Ireland and England for his commissions, including to Blatherwycke Park, Northamptonshire, under the patronage of Augustus Stafford O'Brien. He was friends with fellow artists, Richard Brydges Beechey and Michael Angelo Hayes.

Landscape in County Kerry (1867)

He opened an art academy at 19 Catherine Street, Limerick in 1842. Many of the students were local gentry, members of merchant or military families. Classes were given in oils, map painting, drawing, and watercolour. He was a regular exhibitor with the Royal Hibernian Academy (RHA) between 1843 and 1878. He was nominated for election as a member in 1861, but lost against Francis Danby by one vote. Having closed his school, and moved to Dublin in 1862. Mulcahy exhibited widely in Cork, Dublin and Limerick including at the art union exhibitions and the great industrial exhibitions in both Cork and Dublin.

He exhibited a painting, Landscape composition, at the Royal Irish Art Union in 1843 for which he won a £1,500 prize. His work was also shown in England at institutions including the London Art Union and British Institution. He drew 5 illustrations for the 1850 Ireland: its scenery and character by Samuel Carter Hall. In his later years, Mulcahy struggled for patronage. In 1875, he was elected an associate of the RHA, but stopped exhibited with the academy in 1878, and his associate membership was subsequently withdrawn in 1888.

The National Gallery of Ireland holds a collections of drawings, prints, and 3 oil paintings by Mulcahy donated by his granddaughter, Daisy Molloy. The Limerick City Gallery holds 3 oil paintings and a drawing, and Trinity College Dublin hold 3 portraits of unknown sitters that are attributed to Mulcahy. His private papers were rediscovered in the 2000s, and are held in a family collection. The papers led to renewed knowledge and interest in Mulcahy.

== Selected works ==
- A view of Glin, Co. Limerick (1839)
- A view of Ballinagarde, Co. Limerick (1852)
- A view from Killiney Hill – looking to Bray (1864)
