= View of the Avon Gorge =

Painting by Francis Danby

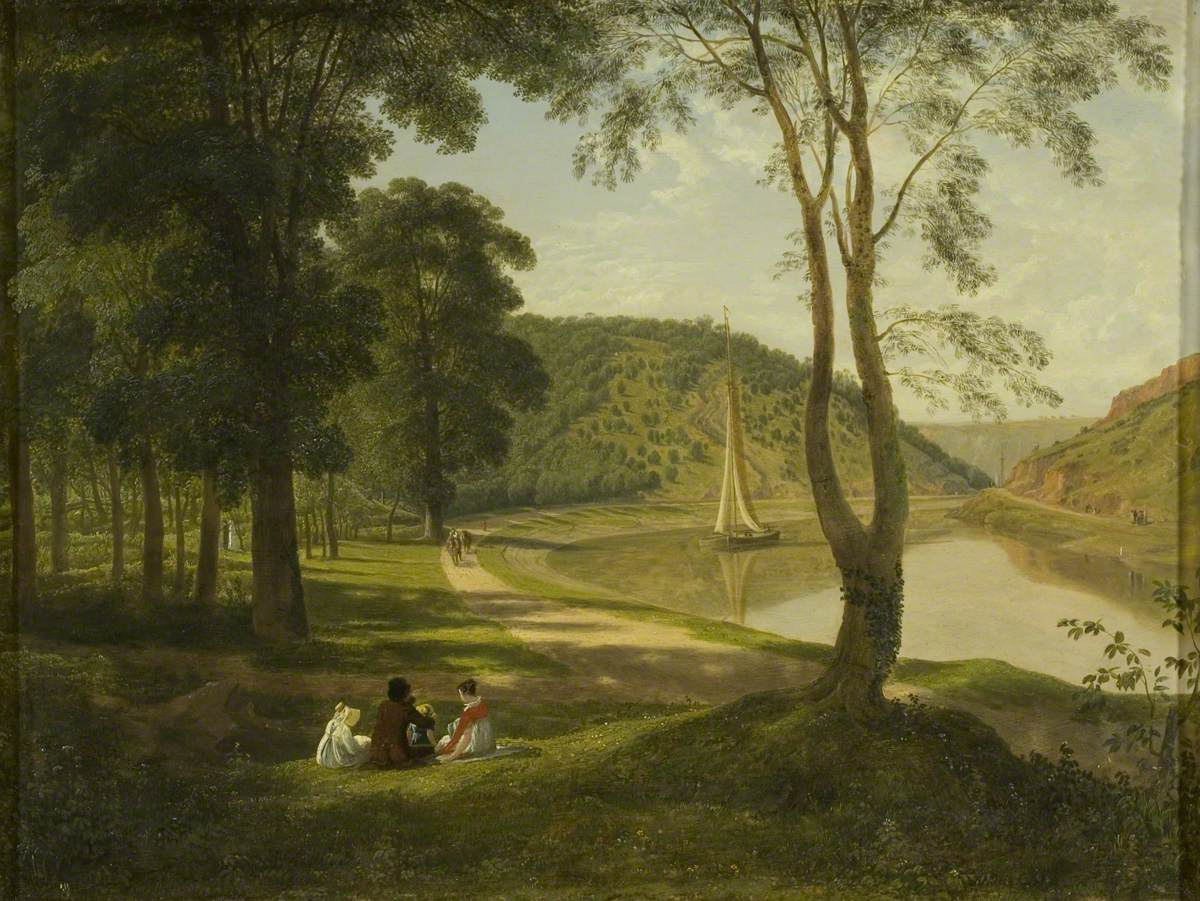
- Artist: Francis Danby
- Year: 1822
- Type: Oil on panel, landscape painting
- Dimensions: 34.5 cm × 46.6 cm (13.6 in × 18.3 in)
- Location: Bristol City Museum and Art Gallery; Bristol

View of the Avon Gorge is an oil on panel landscape painting by the Irish artist Francis Danby, from 1822. It depicts a view of Avon Gorge west of Bristol. Danby was part of the Bristol School who depicted the country around the city during the Regency era. The painting predates the construction of Isambard Kingdom Brunel's Clifton Suspension Bridge by more than decade. It was produced with a pendant work A Scene in Leigh Woods.

The work is today in the collection of the City Museum and Art Gallery, in Bristol, having been acquired in 1956.

== Bibliography ==
- Baetjer, Katharine. Glorious Nature: British Landscape Painting, 1750-1850. Hudson Hills Press, 1993.
- Carter, Julia. Bristol Museum and Art Gallery: Guide to the Art Collection. Bristol Books, 2017.
- Jacobs, Michael & Warner, Malcolm. Art in the West Country. Jarrold, 1980.
