= Thomas Eagles =

English classical scholar (1746–1812)

Thomas Eagles (1746–1812), was an English classical scholar.

== Biography ==
Eagles was baptised in the parish of Temple Church, Bristol, 28 April 1746. He was descended on his father's side from a family which had resided in Temple parish for nearly two centuries; his mother, whose maiden name was Perkins, came from Monmouthshire, and he died seised of estates in that county which had belonged to his maternal ancestors for many hundred years. On 16 September 1757 he was entered at Winchester College. At school he gave promise of becoming an excellent classic. The death of a nobleman, however, to whom he had looked for preferment, obliged him to give up all thoughts of making the church his profession, as his father desired.

Accordingly, he left Winchester, 18 January 1762, and returned to Bristol, where he eventually prospered as a merchant. From 1809 until his death he was collector of the customs at Bristol. He died at Clifton, Bristol on 28 October 1812. His wife, Charlotte Maria Tyndale, survived until 20 February 1814. He left a son, John Eagles. His eldest daughter, Cæcilia, married 9 February 1796 to William Brame Elwyn, barrister-at-law and recorder of Deal, had died before her parents, 3 June 1811, aged 34. In 1811 Eagles was elected a fellow of the Society of Antiquaries.

== Writings ==
To the last Eagles cherished a love for the classics. He left a translation of part of Athenæus, which, under the title of "Collections from the Deipnosophists, or Banquet of the Gods", was announced for publication in the Gentleman's Magazine for January 1813. It never appeared, but by the care of his son "Selections" from the first two books, with notes, were published anonymously in Blackwood's Magazine for 1818 and 1819. Eagles contributed to a periodical essay which appeared on the fourth page of Felix Farley's Bristol Journal, with the title of "The Crier". It came out first in 1785, nearly about the same time that "The Lounger" was published at Edinburgh, and was perhaps the first attempt ever made in a provincial town to support a periodical essay.

After some interruptions it closed in 1802. In 1807 he attempted unsuccessfully to commence a series of papers to be called "The Ghost". He took a warm interest in the Rowley and Chatterton controversy, on which he left some dissertations. He was a Rowleian. He was a painter, but never exhibited his pictures, and was besides an accomplished musician. One of his many acts of quiet benevolence has been beautifully commemorated by his son in an essay, "The Beggar's Legacy", contributed to Blackwood's Magazine in March 1855. A selection from his correspondence with a young acquaintance, R. D. Woodforde, begun in 1787 and closed in 1791, was published by the latter, 8vo, London, 1818.
