= John Eagles =

English painter

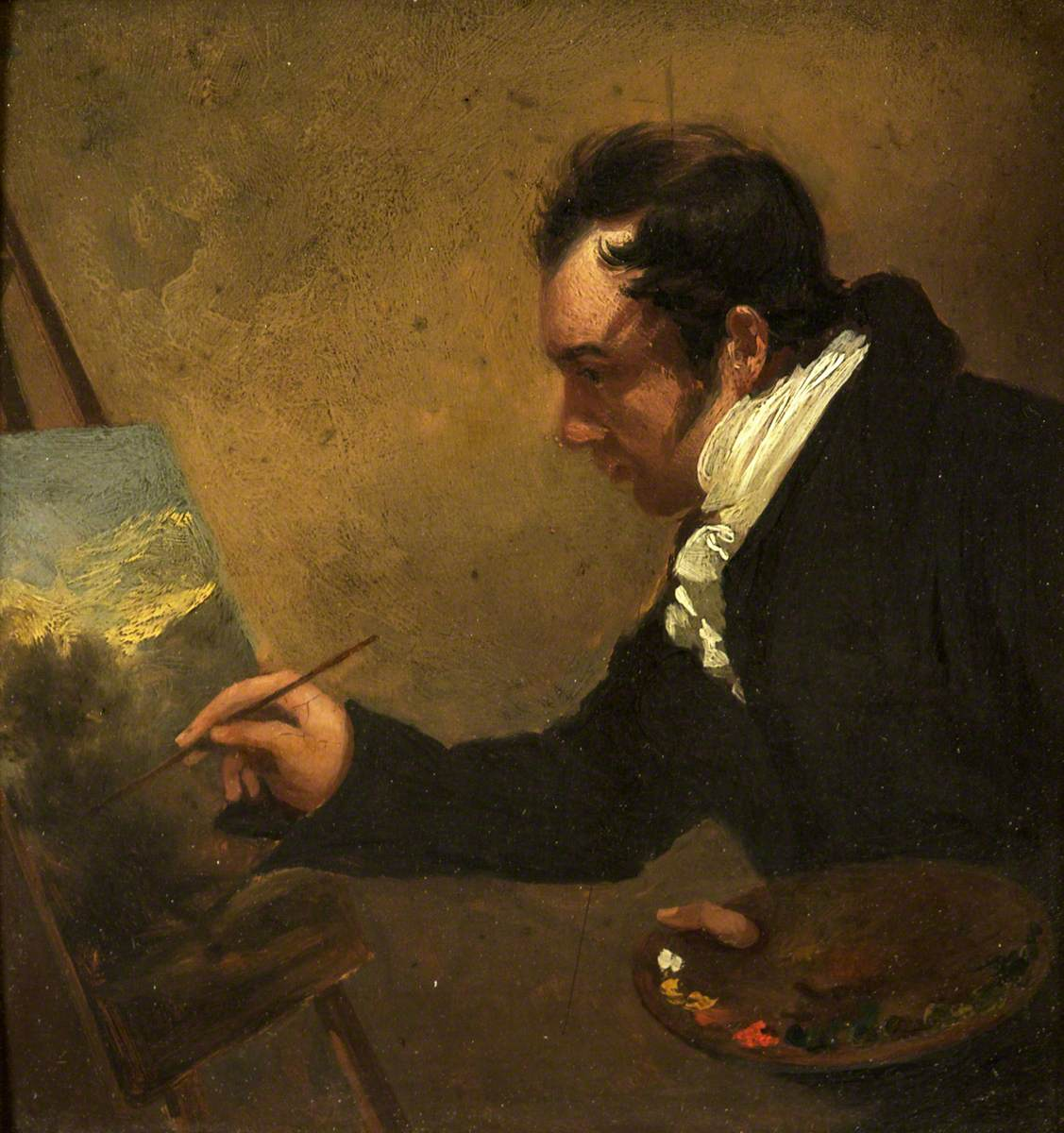
John Eagles by Nathan Cooper Branwhite

John Eagles (1783–1855), was an English artist and author. His essays, mainly in art criticism, appeared in Blackwood's Magazine and were collected and published after his death. He also produced poetry and translations.

== Biography ==
Eagles, the son of Thomas Eagles, was born in the parish of St Augustine, Bristol in 1783, and baptised 8 November of that year. After receiving some preliminary training under the Rev. Samuel Seyer at Bristol, he was admitted a pupil of Winchester College on 9 July 1797, and continued there until 16 July 1802. His wish was to become a landscape-painter. He went on a tour in Italy, and tried to form his style on Gaspard Poussin and Salvator Rosa. While in Italy he narrowly escaped death when sketching on a tier of the Colosseum in Rome. When on his way to draw the Three Temples of Paestum, between Salerno and Eboli he fell in with banditti, and was "literally stript to the skin."

Both adventures are related in his book The Sketcher. He had, too, the reputation of being a good etcher, and in 1823 published six examples after his idol, G. Poussin. In 1809 he was an unsuccessful candidate for admission in the Water-Colour Society. At length he determined to take orders, and with that view entered Wadham College, Oxford. He took the two degrees in arts, B.A. 14 January 1812, M.A. 13 May 1818. His first curacy was that of St Nicholas, Bristol. In 1822 he removed with his family to the curacy of Halberton in Devonshire, where he resided for twelve or thirteen years. For the last five years of this time Sydney Smith was his rector. From Halberton he removed to the curacy of Winford, near Bristol, and thence to Kinnersley in Herefordshire, "where he held the living for a friend;" but in 1841, relinquishing all regular duty, he returned to live near his birthplace. He died at King's Parade, Clifton, Bristol, on 8 November 1855. He left a numerous family.

Eagles was shy and retiring, but hospitable to men of similar tastes. For "society at large" he "cared little," and did not trouble himself touching what the world thought of him or his occupations (introduction to The Sketcher, 1856). There is a crayon portrait of Eagles by Nathan Cooper Branwhite, and another in oils by James Curnock.

== Writings ==
From 1831 till within a few months of his death Eagles was a contributor to Blackwood's Magazine. His contributions were chiefly on art, and the best of these were contained in a series of papers entitled The Sketcher, which appeared in the magazine during 1833–35. Having been revised by himself the autumn before he died, they were published in a volume, 8vo, Edinburgh and London, 1856. Another volume of miscellaneous Essays contributed to Blackwood's Magazine was issued the following year. Though not in the first rank, they are brimful of shrewd sense, genial humour, amusing anecdote, apt quotation, and duly italicised puns.

Eagles wrote on the fine arts as a critic of the old-fashioned school, to which he loyally adhered in artistic as in other matters. Scattered throughout The Sketcher are many pleasing lyrics. A selection from these and other of his poems, original or translated, was made by the author's friend, John Mathew Gutch, and fifty copies printed for private distribution, 8vo, Worcester, 1857. It contains a reissue of a Latin macaronic poem which had appeared at intervals in the columns of Felix Farley's Bristol Journal, then under the editorship of Gutch, and was written to expose the abuses which had for years existed in several public bodies in Bristol, especially in the corporation. These rhymes, enlarged and translated with notes and some humorous designs, were afterwards published as Felix Farley, Rhymes, Latin and English, by Themaninthemoon, 8vo, Bristol, 1826. Some imitations in English of the Horatian ode, mostly on similar subjects, also contributed to Felix Farley, are less happy. A volume of Sonnets, edited by another friend, Zoë King, 8vo, Edinburgh and London, 1858, contains 114 examples, characterised for the most part by thought and refinement.

Eagles left in manuscript translations of the first two books of the Odyssey and of five cantos of Orlando Furioso. He also edited The Journal of Llewellin Penrose, a Seaman, 4 vols. 8vo, London, 1815, one edition of which he sold to Murray for two hundred guineas. Another edition was published by Taylor & Hessey, 8vo, London, 1825. It is a narrative partly founded upon incidents in the life of the author, William Williams, whom Thomas Eagles had rescued from destitution. Williams bequeathed the manuscript to his benefactor. Nearly half a century afterwards John Eagles told the tale in one of his latest and best Blackwood essays, "The Beggar's Legacy".
