= George Cumberland =

English art collector, writer and poet (1754–1848)

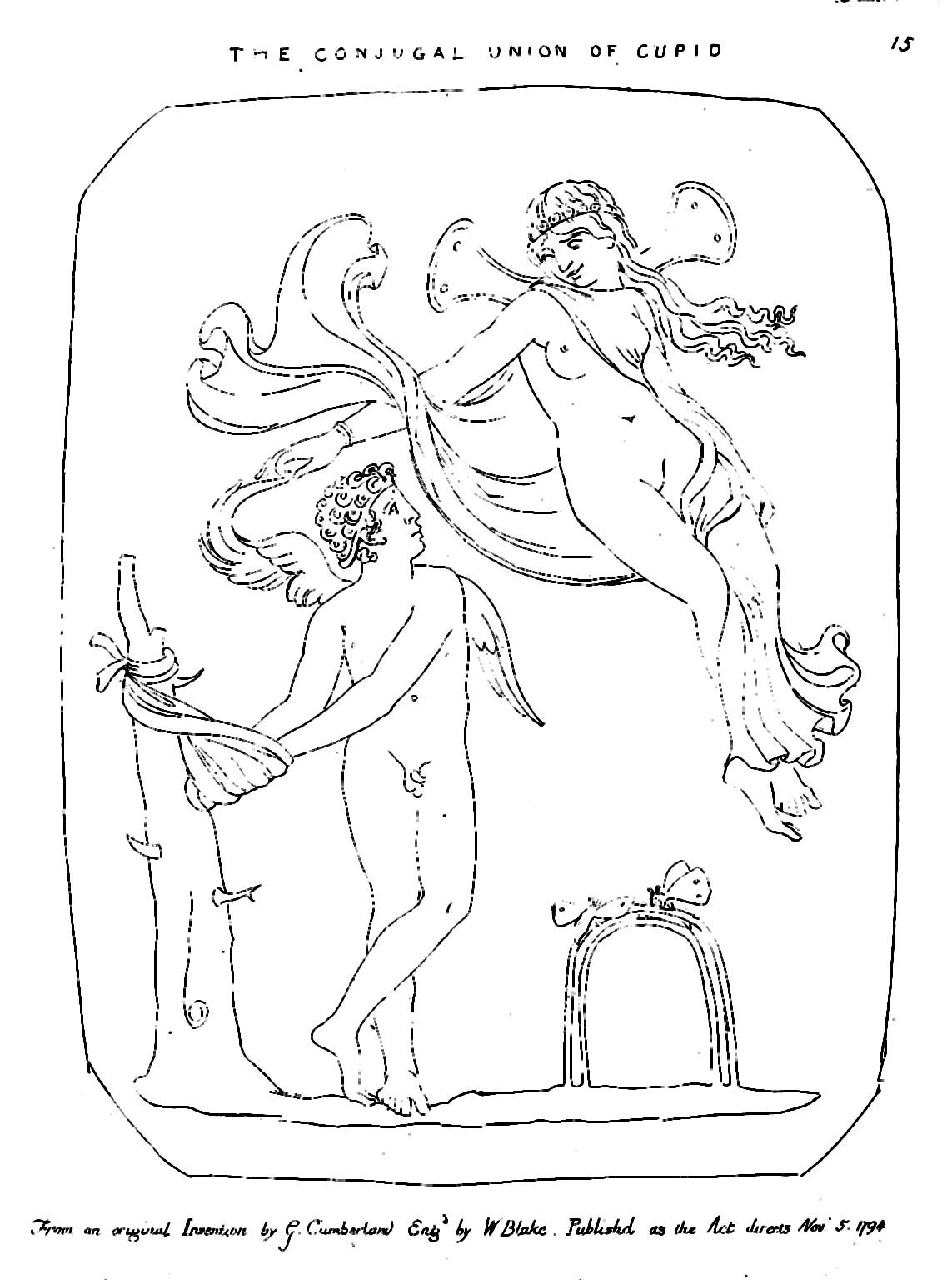
- Cumberland's The Conjugal Union of Cupid, from Thoughts on Outline (1796, etched by William Blake)
- Born: 27 November 1754; London
- Died: 8 August 1848 (aged 93); Bristol
- Occupations: Art collector, writer, poet, printmaker, watercolourist

George Cumberland (27 November 1754 – 8 August 1848) was an English art collector, writer and poet. He was a lifelong friend and supporter of William Blake, and like him was an experimental printmaker. He was also an amateur watercolourist, and one of the earliest members of the Bristol School of artists. He made use of his wide circle of connections to help its other members, in particular assisting and influencing Edward Bird and Francis Danby.

== Early life ==
Cumberland, whose father was also called George, was born in London in 1754. From 1769–85 he was an insurance clerk with the Royal Exchange Assurance Corporation. In 1772 he also attended the Royal Academy Schools and exhibited at the Academy in 1782 and 1783, but failed to be elected an Associate in 1784. He formed a low opinion of the Academy and attacked it in various essays.

Along with John Flaxman and Thomas Stothard, Cumberland joined the social circle of William Blake within a year of Blake becoming a student at the Royal Academy Schools in 1779. This circle also included the engraver William Sharp. The young Cumberland held radical views; with Stothard and Sharp, he joined the Society for Constitutional Information, becoming a friend of its leader, John Horne Tooke, and attracting the attention of government spies. However, when Cumberland witnessed the Gordon Riots of 1780 at first hand, he reacted with horror.

Cumberland was to be a lifelong friend and supporter of Blake. As early as 1780 a contribution by Cumberland to the Morning Chronicle praised Blake's first exhibit at the Academy, the watercolour The Death of Earl Goodwin. Cumberland would often seek to provide clients for Blake, as in 1798 when he tried to persuade Tooke to use Blake as the engraver for a new edition of Tooke's book Diversions of Purleigh.

Cumberland shared an interest with Blake in printmaking. In 1784 they both experimented with new methods of printing etched texts. In that year Cumberland printed an account of his "New Mode of Printing", although it does not seem to have been a practical commercial proposition. In printing his own works Cumberland would come to rely on Blake's technical advice on copperplate and lithography.

== Italy ==
In 1784 Cumberland received an inheritance providing him with an annual income of £300, enabling him to leave his job. From 1785–90 he travelled in Europe, mainly living in Rome. He also visited Paris and Florence, and in 1786 visited Switzerland with Charles Long, 1st Baron Farnborough. In 1787 he eloped with Mrs Elizabeth Cooper née Price and took her back to Italy.

In Rome he joined a circle of artists which included John Deare, Robert Fagan, Charles Grignion the Younger and Samuel Woodforde. Cumberland studied the works of Raphael and the engravers Marcantonio Raimondi and Giulio Bonasone and formed a collection of prints and objects, in particular a large collection of Bonasone engravings.

== Publications ==
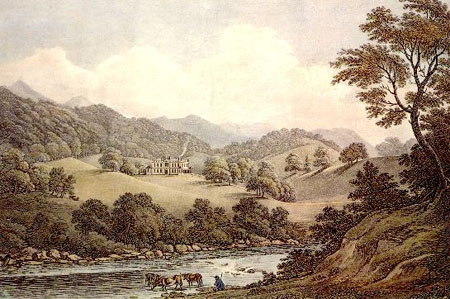
The Woods of Hafod (1795) by John Warwick Smith

After Cumberland's return from Italy in 1790 he first lived near Southampton, where he continued to build his art collection. From 1793–98 he lived in Egham, Surrey. In 1793 he published Poem on the Landscapes of Great Britain and the illustrated poem Lewina, the Maid of Snowdon. In the same year he published Some Anecdotes of the Life of Julio Bonasoni, prefaced by A Plan for the Improvement of the Arts in England, which contained a proposal for the formation of a national gallery. His Italian studies bore further fruit in 1796 when he published Thoughts on Outline, a set of theoretical principles for classical art illustrated with 24 designs by Cumberland on classical subjects. Cumberland etched 16 of the designs and commissioned Blake to etch the other 8, with Blake providing the inscriptions for all 24. Blake also provided Cumberland with advice on the engraving process.

Another of Cumberland's friends was Thomas Johnes, who was influenced by Cumberland to become a translator of medieval French chronicles. In 1796 Cumberland produced An Attempt to Describe Hafod, a guide to Johnes's estate of Hafod in Wales. Cumberland commissioned Blake to engrave a map to accompany the guide.

In 1798 Cumberland published a utopian novel, The Captive of the Castle of Sennaar. He called his utopia Sophis, setting it in Africa, and gave it classical Greek virtues but without war, slavery or sexual inequality. Fearing that its radicalism would antagonise the authorities, Cumberland withdrew the novel, though not before he had sent a copy to another of his acquaintances, Isaac D'Israeli.

== Bristol School ==
In 1803 Cumberland moved to Weston-super-Mare in Somerset, and then in 1807 to Bristol where he lived for the rest of his life. He became one of the earliest members of the informal group of artists which has become known as the Bristol School, and one of the first to take part in the group's excursions to sketch the scenery around Bristol. Cumberland's daughter Eliza and probably also his son George Cumberland, Jr. sometimes joined these excursions. His friend Stothard also participated occasionally.

Cumberland believed that painting should be directly from nature; he produced small landscape studies which avoided the picturesque. His watercolours were similar in style to those of his friend John Linnell. It was Cumberland's son George, a pupil of Linnell, who introduced Linnell to Blake in 1818.

Cumberland became a close friend of Edward Bird, and godfather to his son. He did not have the resources to be Bird's patron, but he would lend Bird items from his art collection to study. In 1814 when Bird asked for help in gaining a royal commission, Cumberland introduced him to Charles Long, who then arranged with the Prince Regent for Bird to conduct royal portrait studies aboard the royal yacht. On Bird's death in 1819 Cumberland successfully petitioned the Royal Academy to provide a pension for Bird's widow.

Cumberland helped many of the Bristol artists through recommendations and introductions to his influential friends. In 1820 when Francis Danby exhibited The Upas Tree of Java at the British Institution, Cumberland exerted his influence to promote its favourable reception. In 1822 when Danby, Branwhite and Johnson were about to visit London, Cumberland ensured that Thomas Lawrence, Thomas Stothard and others were alerted.

There is evidence from their correspondence that Cumberland often suggested subjects for Danby to paint. It has been suggested that the influence of Blake may also have been transmitted to Danby. Danby's second exhibited painting was Disappointed Love, shown at the Royal Academy in 1821. Its subject is reminiscent of Blake's Songs of Innocence and of Experience, while the work's neoclassical figure of a girl evokes Cumberland's Thoughts on Outline. A later watercolour, A Scene from "A Midsummer Night's Dream" (1832) is very reminiscent of Blake's illustrations for The Book of Thel.

Cumberland had been the recipient from Blake of one of the 16 early copies of The Book of Thel and one of For Children: The Gates of Paradise, only five of which now survive. He also had copies of America a Prophecy, Europe a Prophecy, The Song of Los, Visions of the Daughters of Albion and Songs of Innocence and of Experience.

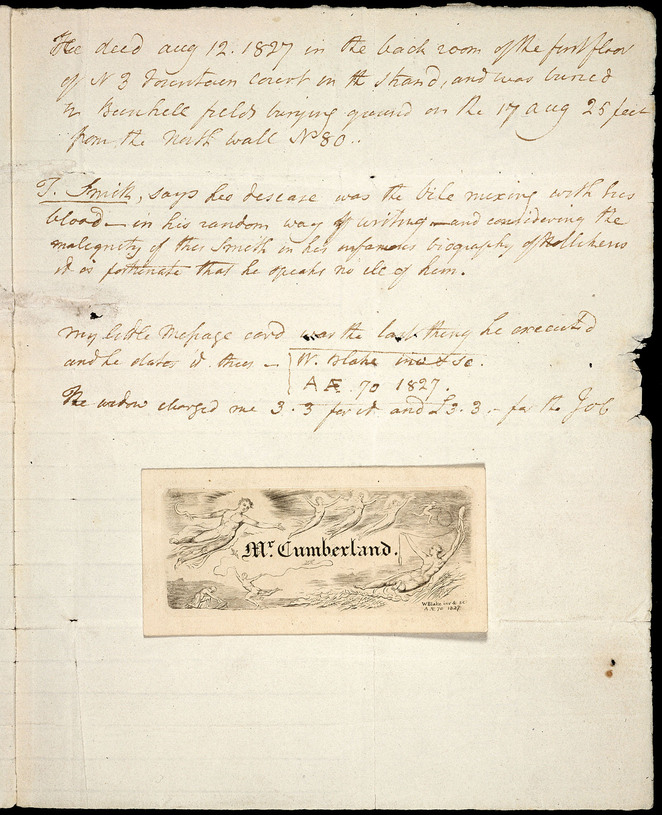
Note by Cumberland recording Blake's death in August 1827. His visiting card made by Blake is attached.

Blake died in 1827. The last engraving that Blake made was a visiting card for Cumberland, who had sent the plate to Blake for him to decorate. Blake did so by surrounding Cumberland's name with figures intended to represent the Seasons, including children hoop rolling and flying kites.

== Final years ==
Cumberland was also a collector of fossils and from 1810 was an honorary member of the Geological Society. In 1826 he published Reliquiae conservatae, a study of some fossil encrinites.

In 1827 he published Essay on the Utility of Collecting the Best Works of the Ancient Engravers of the Italian School, which catalogued his collection of prints. He presented his collections to the Royal Academy and the British Museum.

Cumberland's wife Elizabeth died on 2 February 1837. He died on 8 August 1848 in Bristol; they were both buried at St George's Church, Brandon Hill. They had two sons, George and Sydney, and three daughters, Lavinia, Aurora and Eliza.
