= James Francis Danby =

English landscape painter

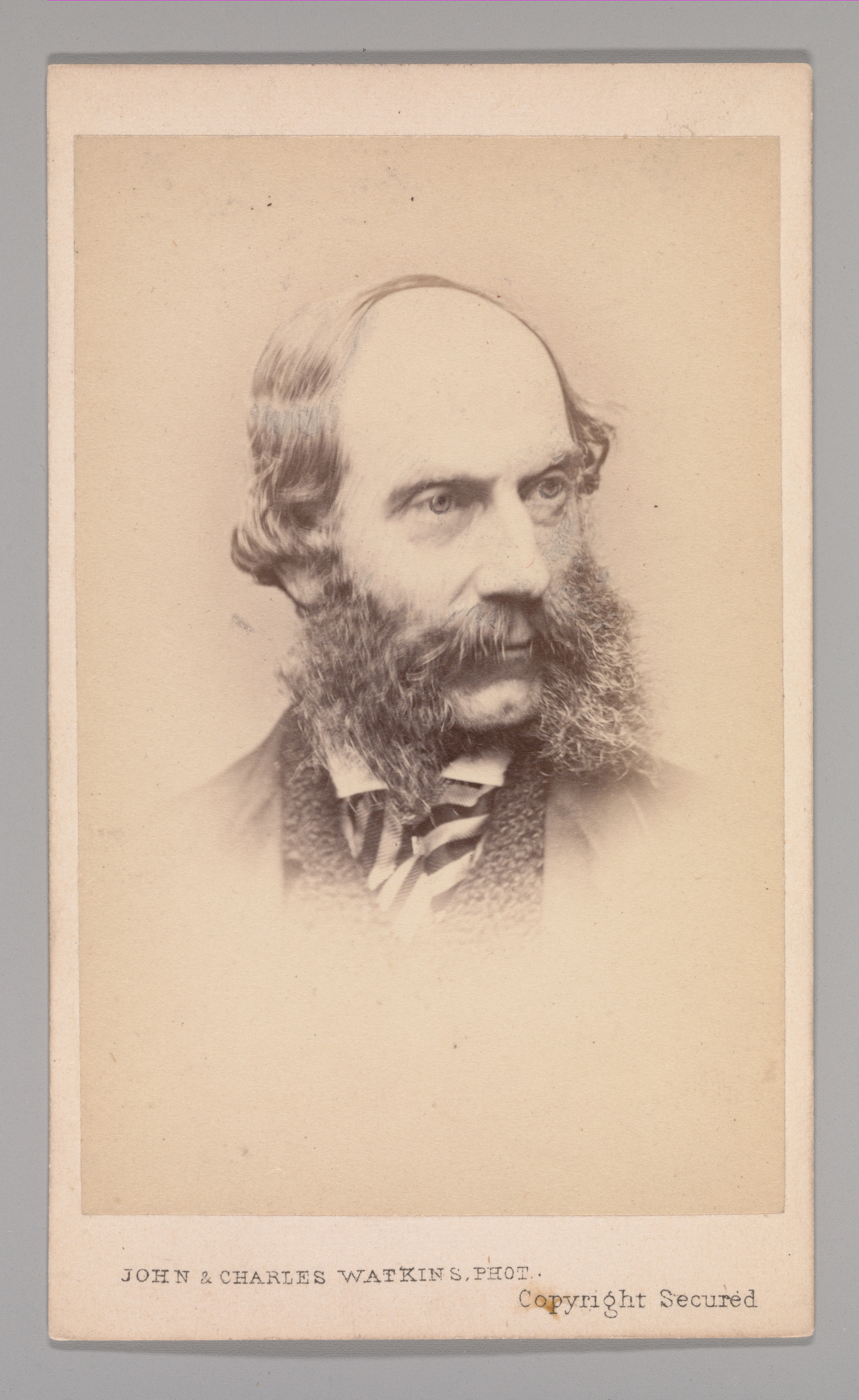
James Francis Danby

James Francis Danby (1816-1875) was an English landscape painter who excelled in depicting sunrise and sunset.

== Biography ==
Danby was born at Bristol in 1816, the son of Francis Danby, A.R.A.

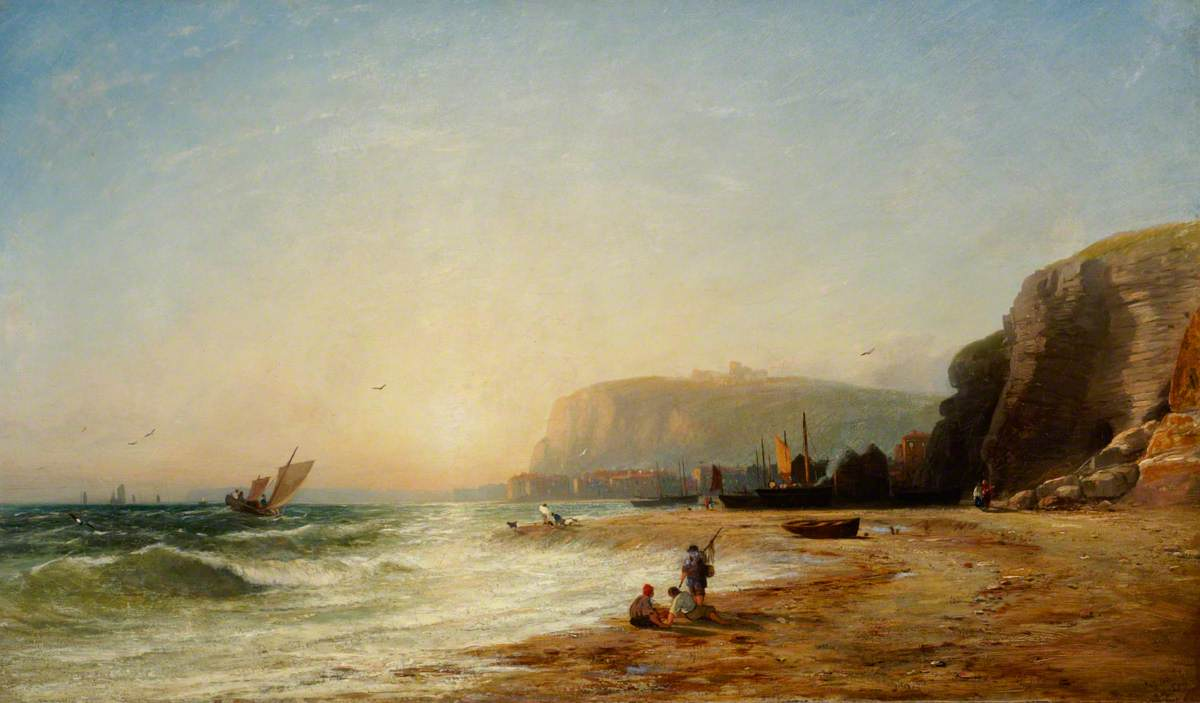
Hastings by James Francis Danby

His works appeared at the Royal Academy, and at the Society of British Artists, of which he was a member of the latter. Amongst his best works are:

- Loch Lomond.
- Dover, from the Canterbury Road. 1849.
- Dumbarton Rock. 1854.
- Morning on the Thames. 1860.
- Wreck on Exmouth Bar. 1861.
- Carrickfergus Castle. 1867.
- North Shields: Sunrise. 1869.

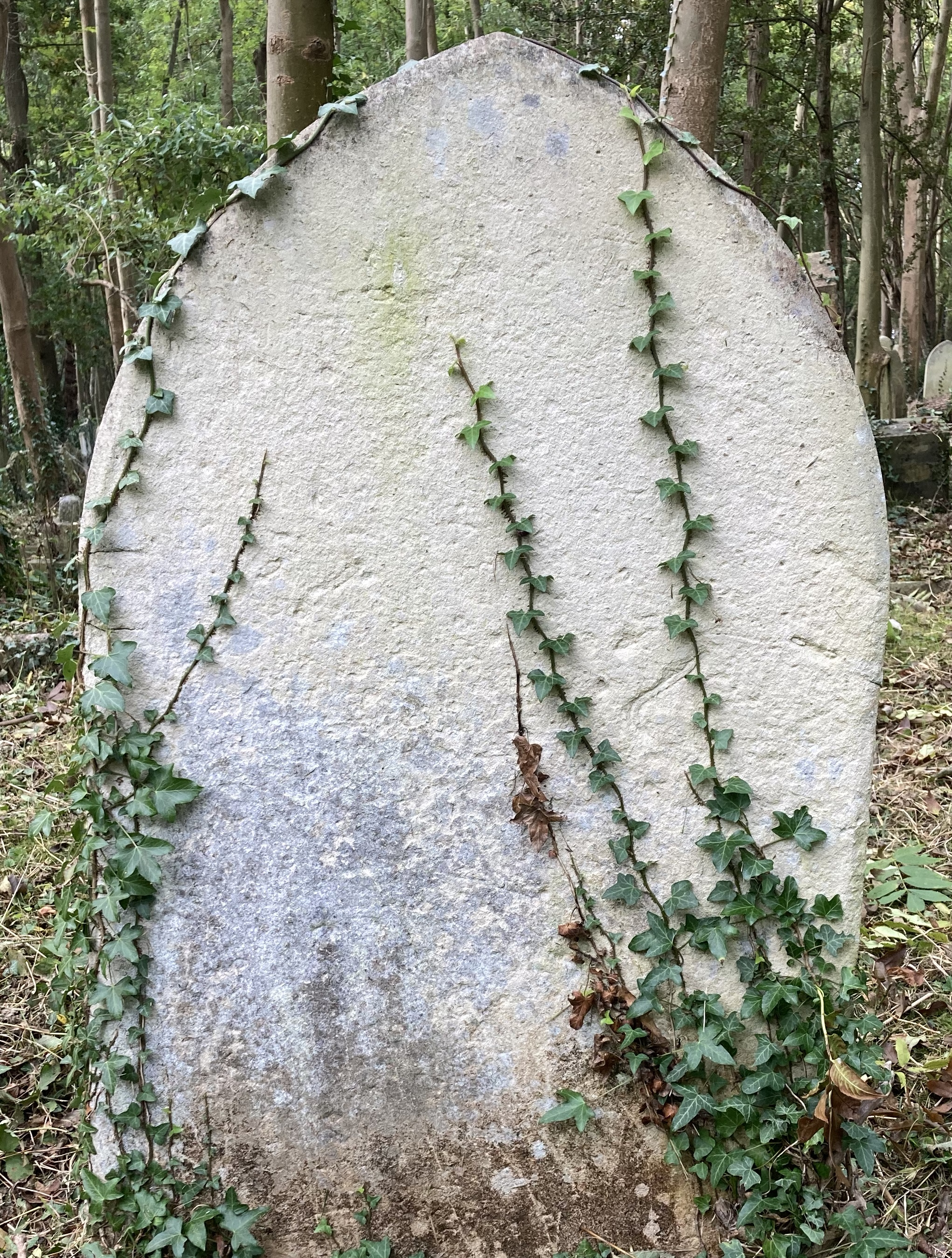
Grave of James Francis Danby in Highgate Cemetery

He died of apoplexy in London in 1875 and was buried on the eastern side of Highgate Cemetery. The inscription on the headstone above his plot (no.20952) has completely worn away.
