= John Gibbons (ironmaster) =

English ironmaster (1777–1851)

John Gibbons (1777-18 August 1851) was a South Staffordshire ironmaster and art patron.

== Career ==
John was one of three sons of Thomas Gibbons (1730–1813) of The Oaks, Tettenhall, Wolverhampton.

The three brothers, John, Benjamin and Thomas, inherited their father's iron making businesses after his death in 1813 running them as a set of interlocking partnerships. In 1816 a banking side of the business failed bringing the iron business down as well. During the 1820s the brothers built three new furnaces at the Corbyn's Hall Colliery and Ironworks and also worked together at the Ketley works near Dudley. They were early adopters of J. B. Neilson's patent hot-blast technology when it became widely available in the mid-1830s, but there was little they could do to overcome the declining competitiveness of south Staffordshire as a pig iron-producing region, in the face of competition from the Scottish and Cleveland iron industries in the middle of the nineteenth century. The family's problems in the iron trade were for a long time compensated for by the resilience of their coal interests. The long-established Gibbons habit of buying land stood them in good stead, for it furnished them with a good deal of mineral-rich real estate in south Staffordshire. The Corbyn's Hall estate proved a consistent source of wealth in this respect.

John proved to be the most technically adept of the brothers, publishing two short works on industrial practice: Practical Remarks on the Construction of the Staffordshire Blast Furnace (1839) and Practical remarks on the use of the cinder pig in the puddling furnaces, and on the management of the forge and mill (1844).

== Art Patron ==
Gibbons was one of a new breed of upper middle-class patrons who acquired an extensive collection of contemporary British art. He began this activity while residing in Bristol in the 1810s and early 1820 where he fraternised with and supported local artists, especially Francis Danby and E. V. Rippingille, and participated in an informal sketching club with other collectors and painters. When he moved to Staffordshire in the mid-1820s he continued to support these artists of Bristol as well as expanding his collecting interests to include a broader range of British art. By the time of his death in 1851 his collection is estimated to have exceeded two hundred works of art in a gallery specially built at his London home, 16 Hanover Terrace, Regent's Park. He favoured landscape and genre painting, especially the works of Francis Danby, William Collins, John Linnell, W. P. Frith, C. R. Leslie, Thomas Webster and William Mulready. He is known to have owned Yarmouth Jetty, a painting by John Constable. In 1850, three years after William Collins died, his widow Harriet and their sons, moved next door to the Gibbons family at 17 Hanover Terrace, and later in 1856, when Harriet gave up that house she lived for a while at no.16 with Elizabeth.

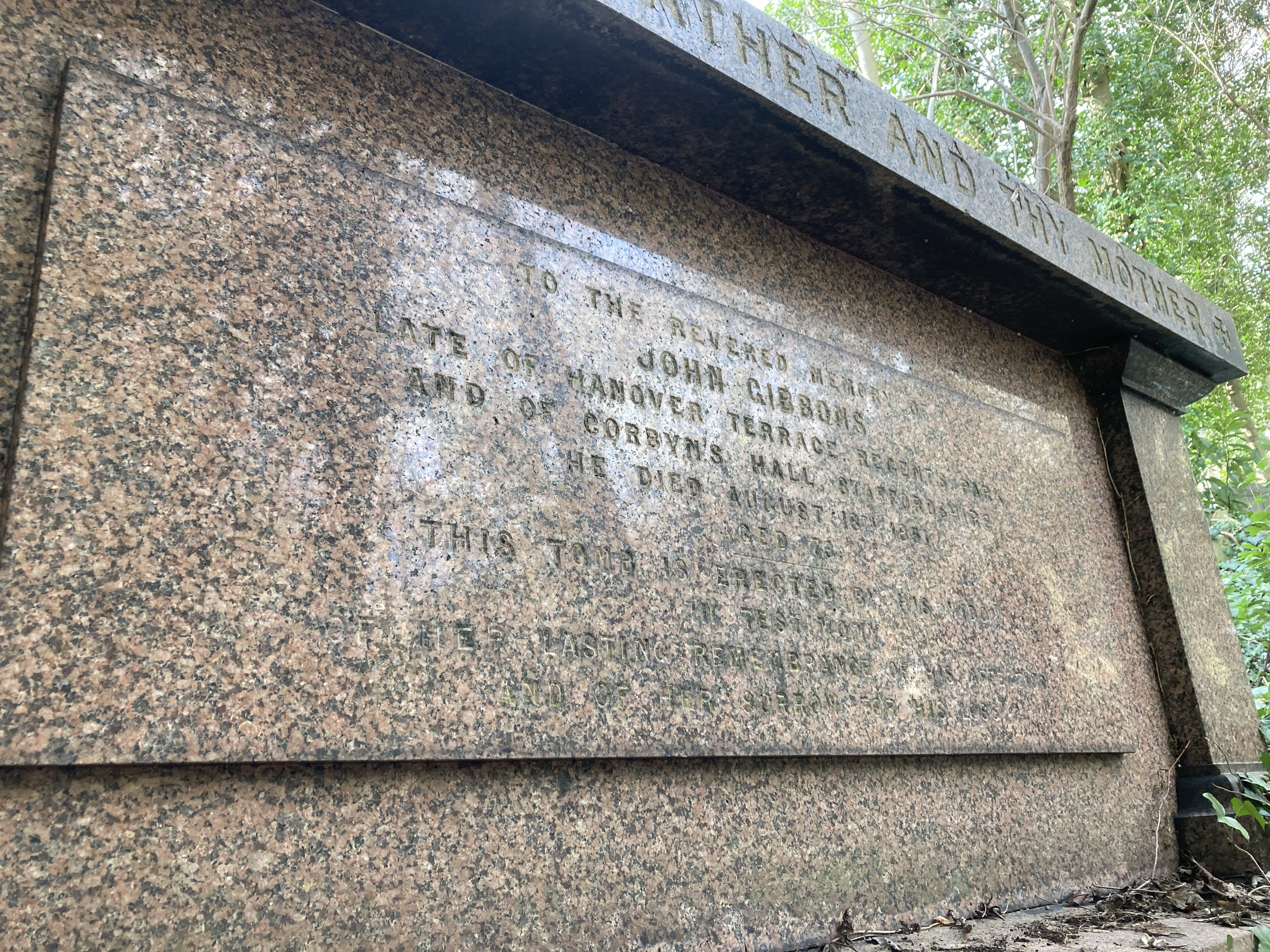
Grave of John Gibbons in Highgate Cemetery (west side)

John Gibbons, who had a weak constitution all his life, died on 18 August 1851, leaving a widow, Elizabeth Steen (d.1889). He is buried in Highgate Cemetery.
