= William James Müller =

English painter (1812–1845)

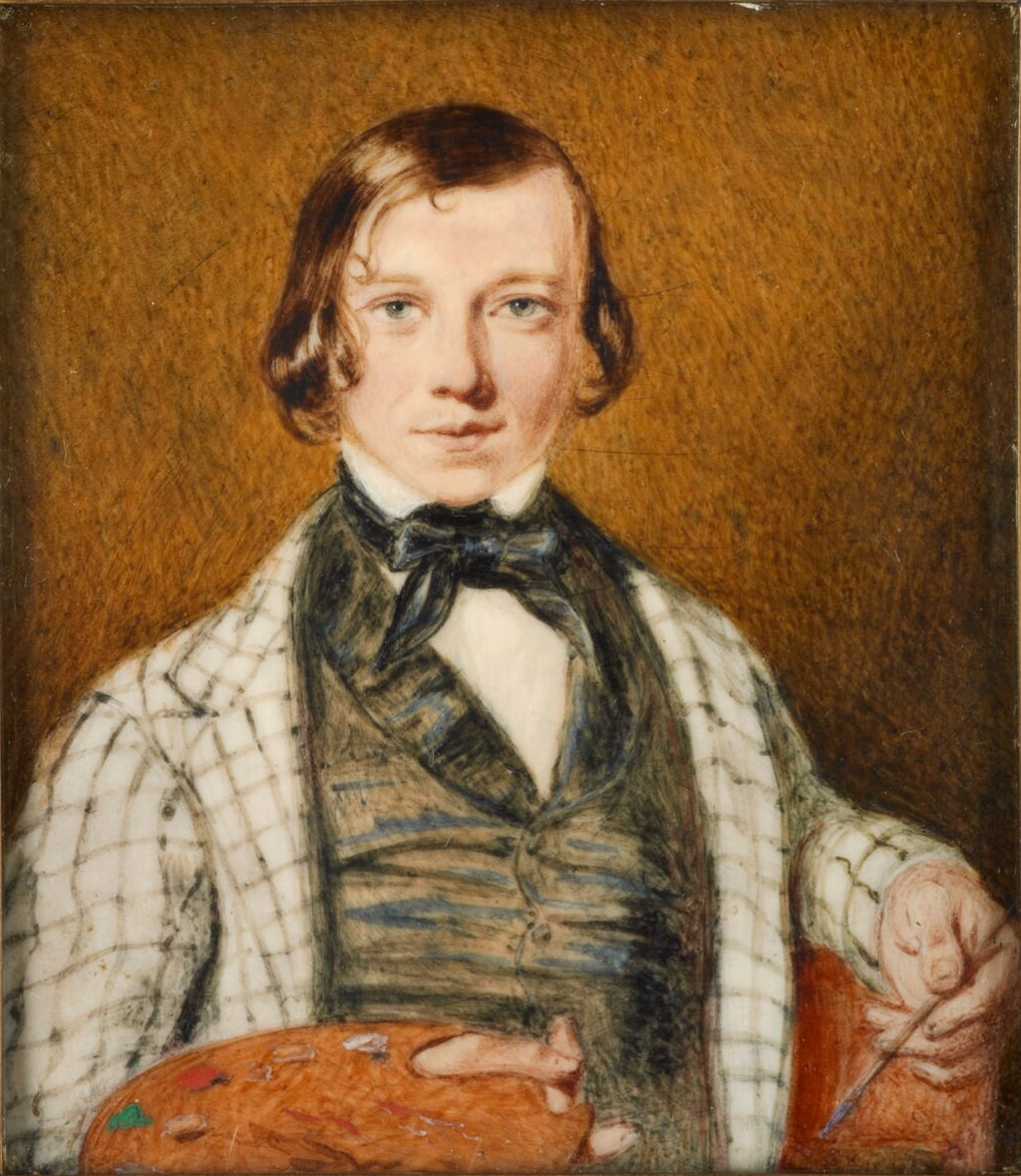
- William James Müller, portrait 1825-50
- Born: William James; 28 June 1812; Bristol, England
- Died: 8 September 1845 (aged 33); Bristol, England
- Resting place: Unitarian Burial Ground, Brunswick Cemetery
- Education: James Baker Pyne
- Known for: Painter
- Movement: Orientalist; Bristol School

William James Müller (28 June 1812 – 8 September 1845), also spelt Muller, was a British landscape and figure painter, the best-known artist of the Bristol School.

== Life ==
Müller was born at Bristol, the son of J. S. Müller, a Prussian from Danzig, curator of a museum in Bristol. He first studied painting under James Baker Pyne. His early pictures were mostly of the scenery of Gloucestershire and Wales, and he learned much from his study of Claude, Ruysdael, and earlier landscape-painters. He witnessed the 1831 Bristol riots and recorded some of the scenes in a series of "raw and brilliant oil and watercolour sketches". In 1833, he exhibited at the Royal Academy for the first time, showing Destruction of Old London Bridge-Morning. The next year he made a tour through France, Switzerland, and Italy.

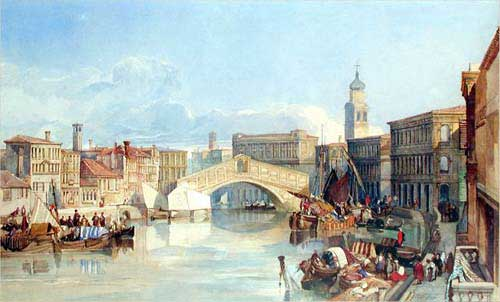
The Rialto Bridge, watercolour by Müller, 1835

He visited the Middle East twice. The first visit was in 1838-39, when he visited Athens, and travelled onwards to Alexandria and Cairo, where he spent two weeks before continuing up the Nile to Luxor, where he made drawings of the ruins and landscapes before returning to Cairo in mid-January. Shortly after his return, he left Bristol and settled in London, where he exhibited regularly. His scenes of Egyptian streets and market proved especially popular. His second visit was to Lycia in south west Turkey in 1843-44 when Charles Fellows was removing the Xanthus Marbles for the British Museum. His journey was at the request of the archaeologist Charles Fellows – but at his own expense – Müller and his pupil Harry Johnson accompanied the government expedition to Lycia. He spent three months sketching the landscape and local people around Xanthus, Pinara, and Tlos. He spent most of the rest of his life, after his return to England, working on watercolours, and a few oils, of Lycian subjects. The work he carried out at Lycia is considered to be among his finest.

In 1840, he again visited France, where he executed a series of sketches of Renaissance architecture, twenty-five of which were lithographed and published in 1841, in a folio entitled The Age of Francis I. of France.

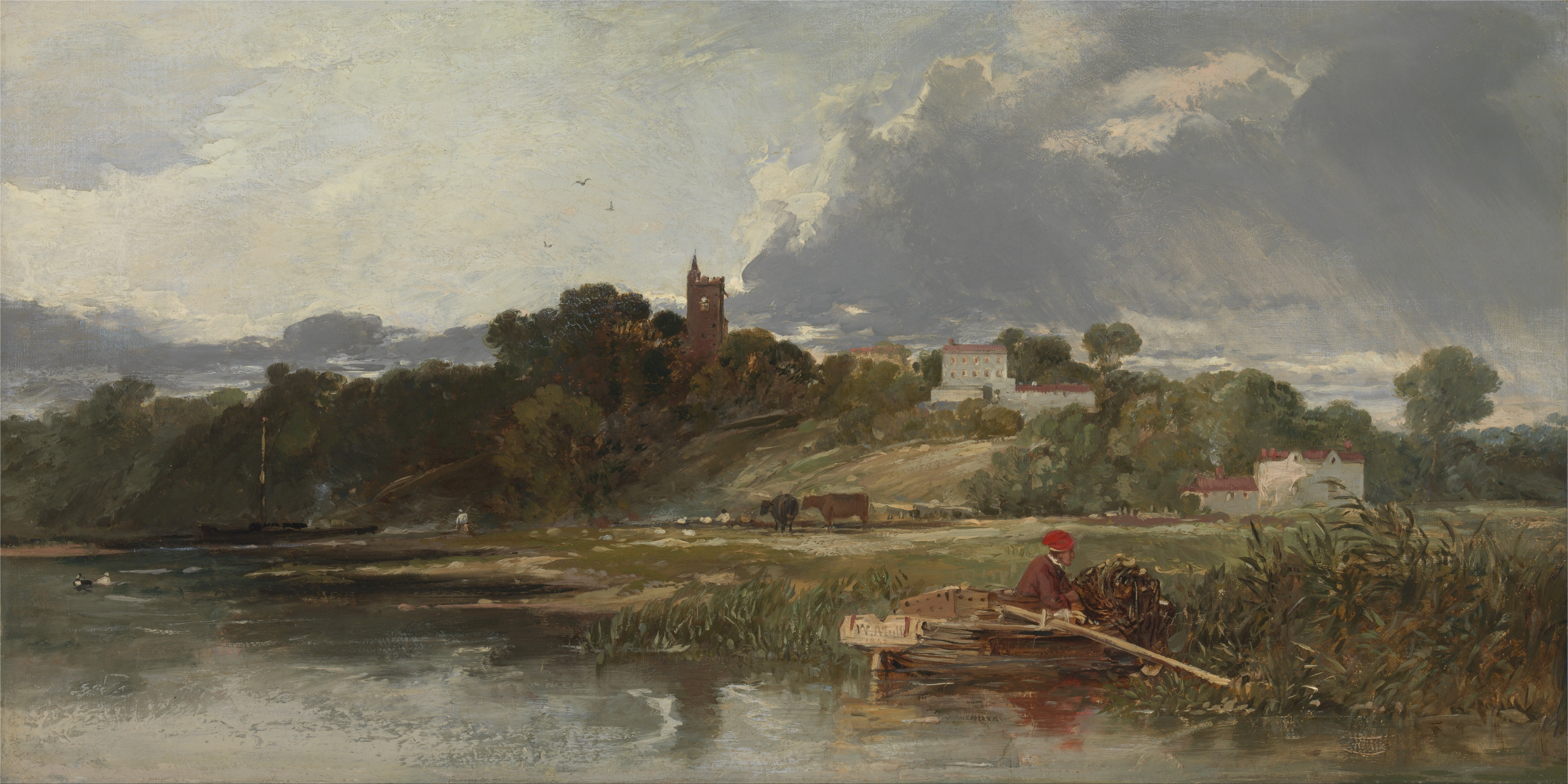
Gillingham on the Medway, 1842

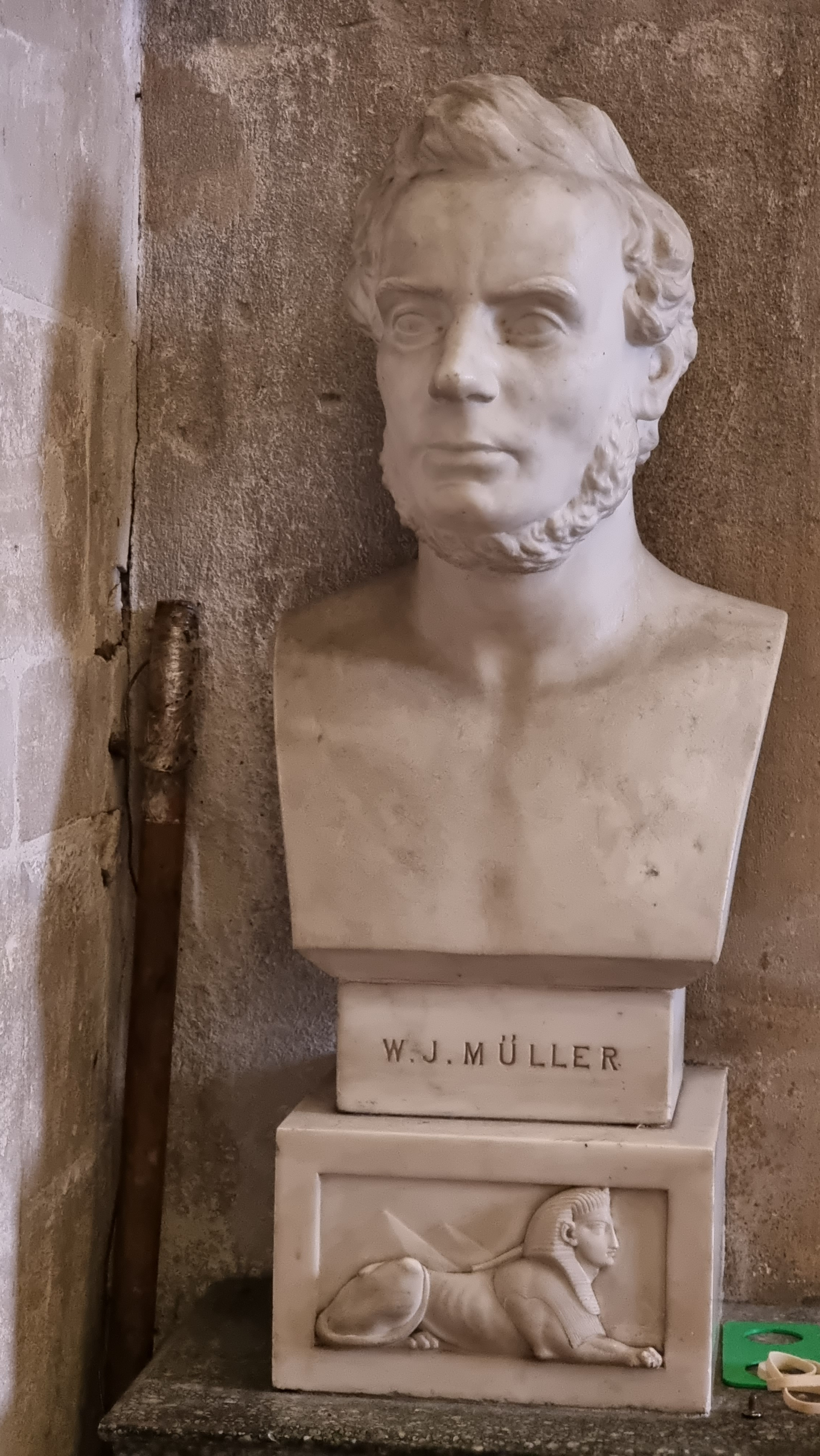
Bust of the late W. J. Müller by Nathan Branwhite, Bristol Cathedral

He died at Bristol on 8 September 1845. Following his death, his work was in great demand; leading to the production of a considerable number of fakes. A biography by Nathaniel Neal Solly was published in 1875.

Muller is buried in the Unitarian burial ground, Brunswick Cemetery, off Brunswick Square, Bristol. His grave is marked by a simple polished black stone slab inscribed "Sacred to the memory of William James Muller who died Sep 8th 1845 Aged 35 years". His age, as given in the inscription is contrary to the burial records which record it as 33. The current tomb stone may be relatively modern, as the grave was recorded as being unmarked on a 1970s survey. A bust of the painter is located at the entrance to the cloister in Bristol Cathedral.

The British Museum was bequeathed a rich collection of Müller's sketches by John Henderson. Biographies of Müller have been written by Solly (1875), Bunt (1948), and Greenacre and Stoddard (1991).

== Publications ==
- William James Müller, Muller's sketches of the age of Francis the First, 26 large and fine tinted drawings on stone of splendid Architecture and Picturesque Old Buildings in France (H. Graves, 1841)

== See also ==
- Royal West of England Academy
