= Francis Danby =

Irish painter

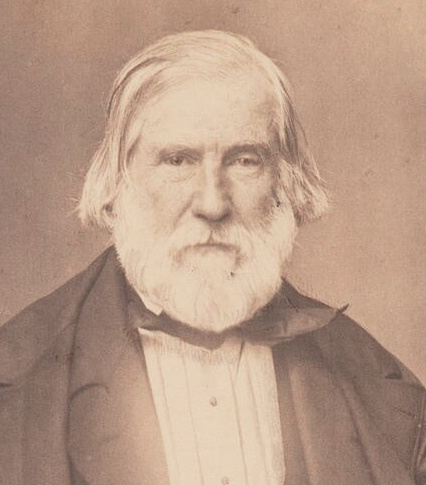
- Danby in the 1850s
- Born: 16 November 1793; County Wexford, Ireland
- Died: 9 February 1861 (aged 67); Exmouth, England
- Known for: Landscape painting

Francis Danby ARA (16 November 1793 – 9 February 1861) was an Irish painter of the Romantic era. His imaginative, dramatic landscapes were comparable to those of John Martin. Danby initially developed his imaginative style while he was the central figure in a group of artists who have come to be known as the Bristol School. His period of greatest success was in London in the 1820s.

== Early life ==
Born in the south-east of Ireland, he was one of a set of twins; his father, James Danby, farmed a small property he owned near Wexford, but his death, in 1807, caused the family to move to Dublin, while Francis was still a schoolboy. He began to practice drawing at the Royal Dublin Society's schools; and under an erratic young artist named James Arthur O'Connor he began painting landscapes. Danby also made acquaintance with George Petrie.

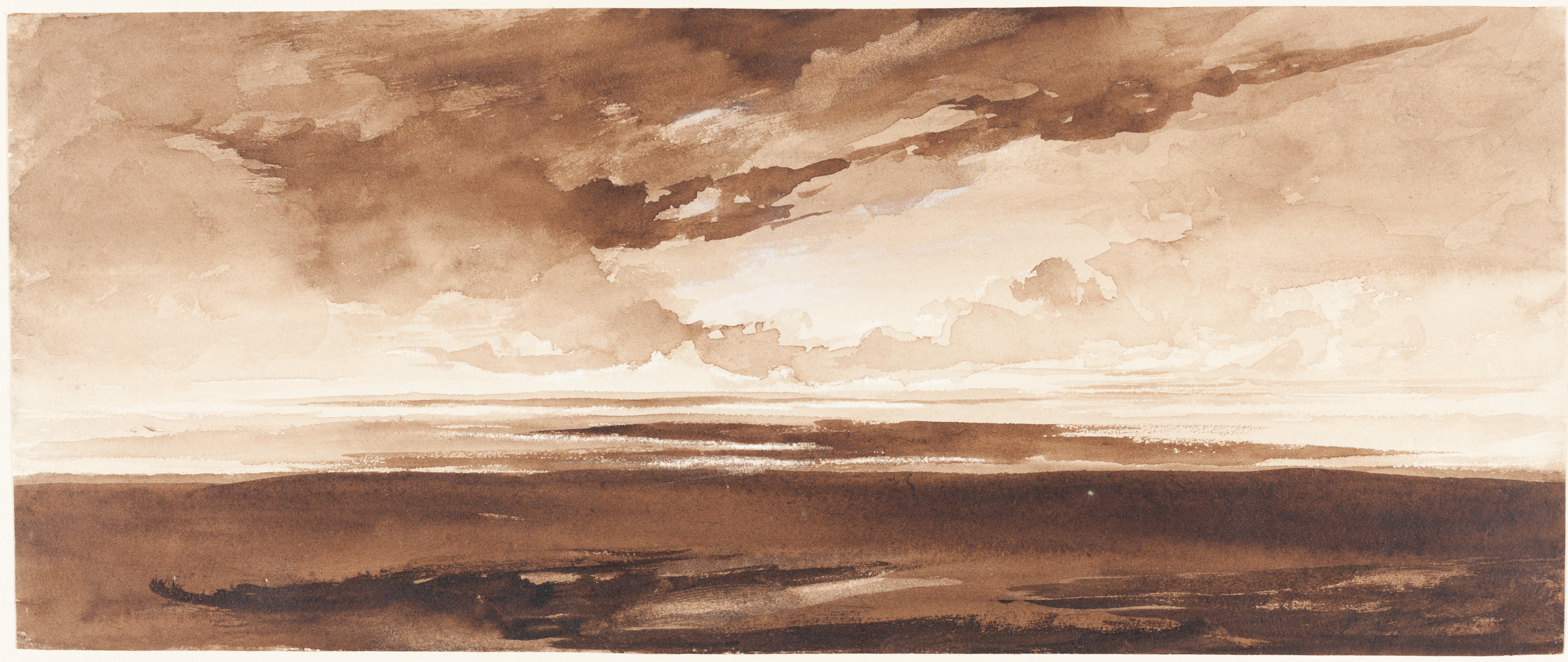
Panorama of the Coast at Sunset, c. 1813, National Gallery of Art

In 1813 Danby left for London together with O'Connor and Petrie. This expedition, undertaken with very inadequate funds, quickly came to an end, and they had to get home again by walking. At Bristol they made a pause, and Danby, finding he could get trifling sums for watercolours, remained there working diligently and sending to the London exhibitions pictures of importance. There his large oil paintings quickly attracted attention.

== Bristol School ==
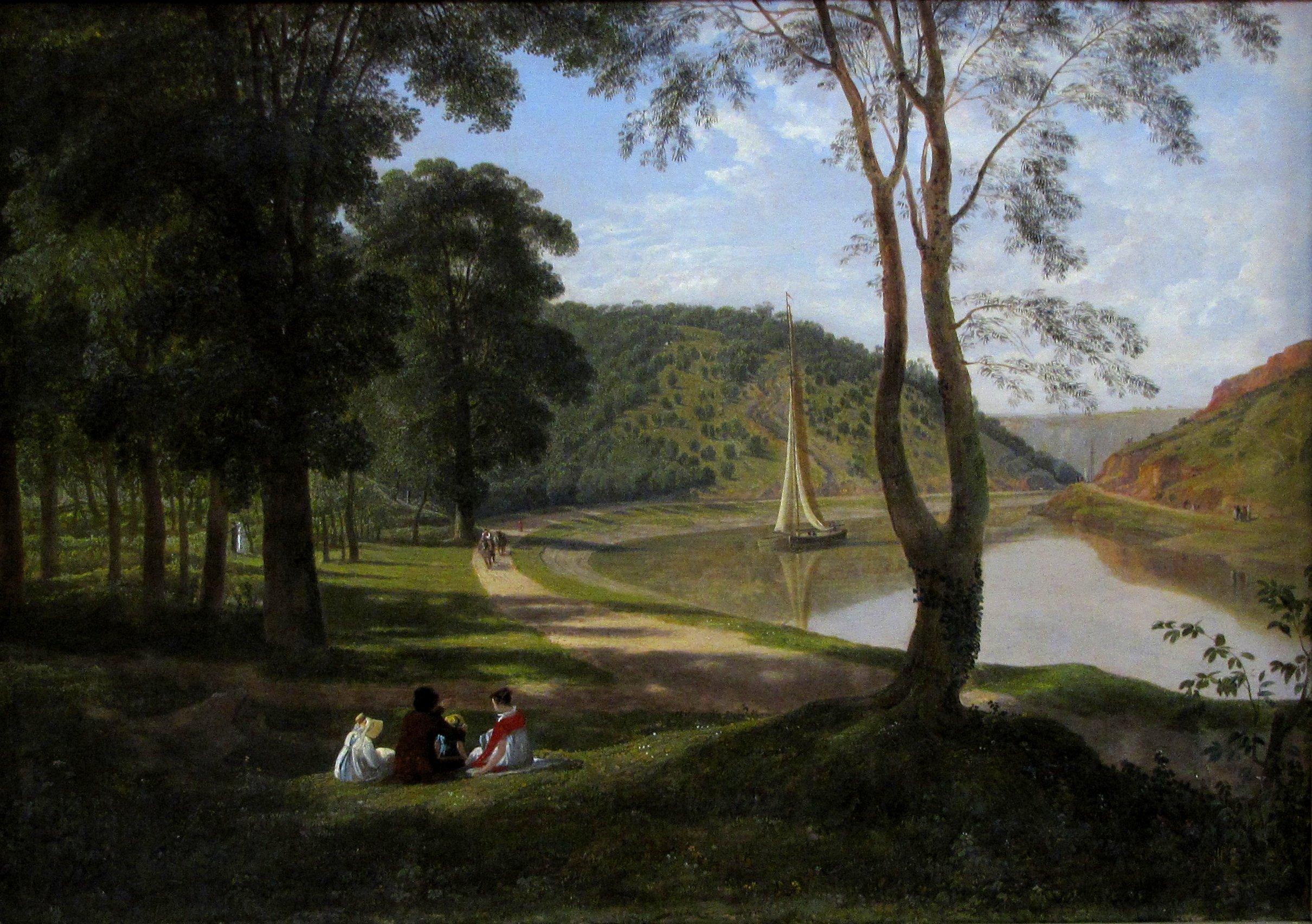
View of the Avon Gorge, oil on panel, 1822

From around 1818/19, Danby was a member of the informal group of artists which has become known as the Bristol School, taking part in their evening sketching meetings and sketching excursions visiting local scenery. His View of the Avon Gorge (1822) depicts figures sketching in a location favoured by the group. He remained connected with members of the Bristol School for around a decade, even after leaving Bristol in 1824.

The group had initially formed around Edward Bird, and Danby would eventually succeed Bird as its central figure. Bird's genre painting had a naturalistic style and fresh colours, and his influence has been seen on Danby's style. Examples are Danby's treatment of figures in Boys Sailing a Little Boat (c. 1821) and The Delivery of Israel out of Egypt (1825). Danby was also close to Edward Villiers Rippingille, whose style developed alongside that of Danby under the influence of Bird.

The Bristol artists, particularly the amateur Francis Gold, were also important in influencing Danby towards a more imaginative and poetical style. George Cumberland, another of the amateurs, had influential London connections. In 1820 when Francis Danby exhibited The Upas Tree of Java at the British Institution, Cumberland used his influence to promote its favourable reception. There is also evidence from their correspondence that Cumberland suggested subjects for Danby to paint. Cumberland was a close friend of William Blake, and it has been suggested that Blake's work may also have had some influence on Danby, for example in Danby's second exhibited painting, Disappointed Love, shown at the Royal Academy in 1821.

Danby's atmospheric work An Enchanted Island, successfully exhibited in 1825 at the British Institution and then back in Bristol at the Bristol Institution, was in turn particularly influential on other Bristol School artists. Letitia Elizabeth Landon included a poem on this work in Poetical Sketches of Modern Pictures, part of her collection, The Troubadour (1825).

== Success ==
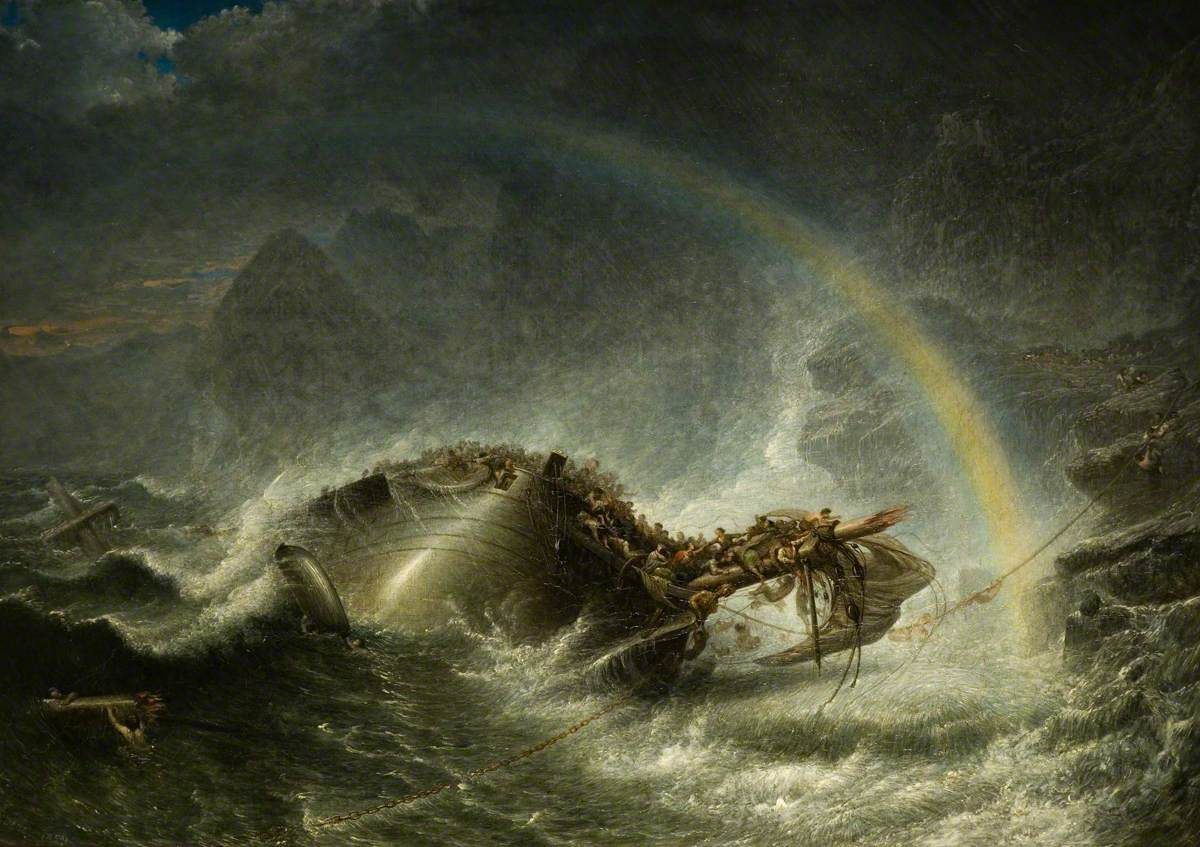
The Shipwreck, oil on canvas, 1859

The Upas Tree (1820) and The Delivery of Israel (1825) brought him his election as an Associate Member of the Royal Academy. He left Bristol for London, and in 1828 exhibited his Opening of the Sixth Seal at the British Institution, receiving from that body a prize of 200 guineas; and this picture was followed by two others on the theme of the Apocalypse.

Danby painted "vast illusionist canvases" comparable to those of John Martin – of "grand, gloomy and fantastic subjects which chimed exactly with the Byronic taste of the 1820s."

== Later years ==
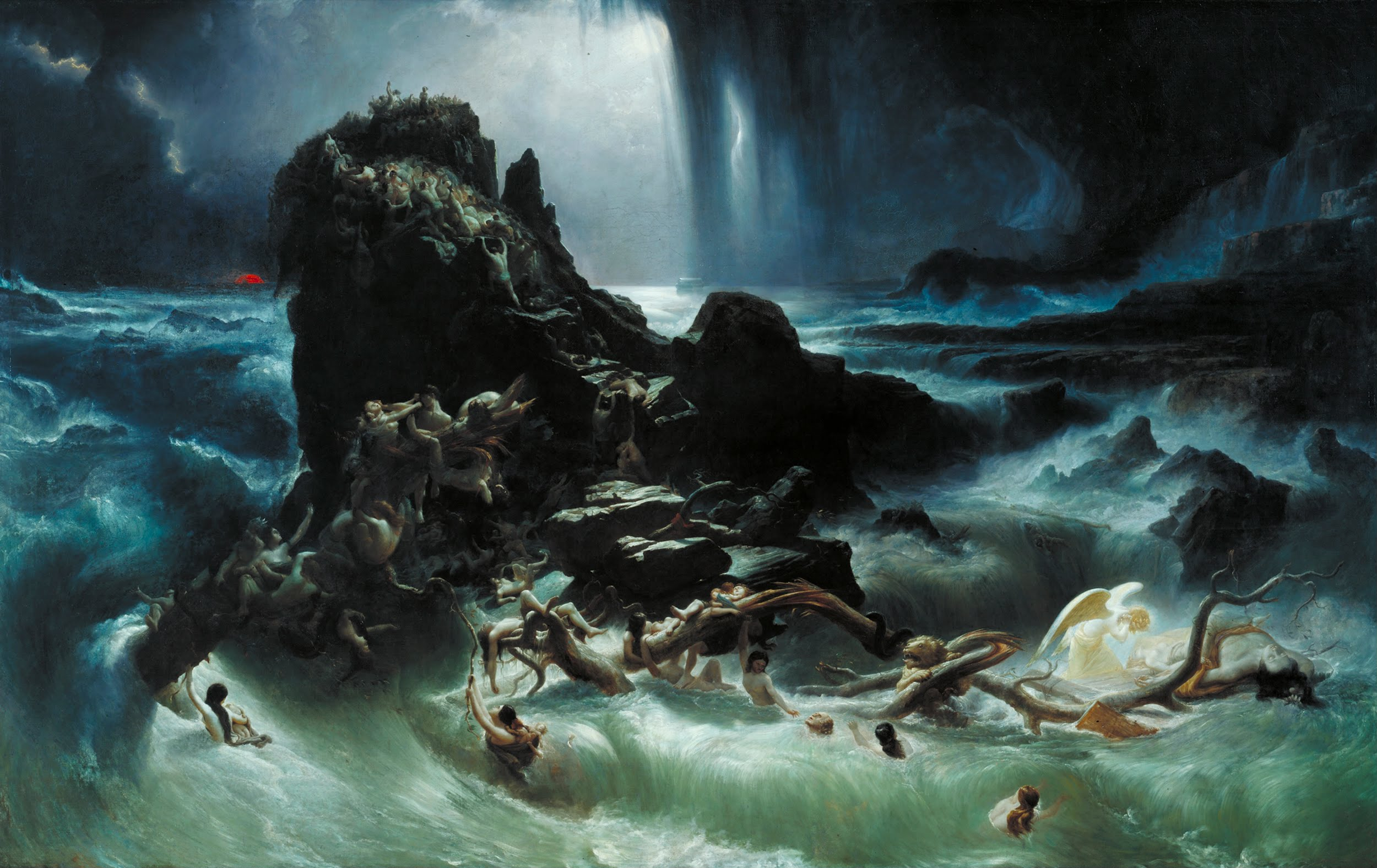
The Deluge, oil on canvas, 1840

Danby was sculpted by Christopher Moore in 1828.

In 1829 Danby's wife deserted him, running off with the painter Paul Falconer Poole. Danby left London, declaring that he would never live there again, and that the academy, instead of aiding him, had, somehow or other, used him badly. For a decade he lived on the Lake of Geneva in Switzerland, becoming a bohemian with boatbuilding fancies, painting only now and then. He later moved to Paris for a short period of time.

He returned to England in 1840, when his sons, James and Thomas, both artists, were growing up. Danby exhibited his large (15 feet wide) and powerful The Deluge that year; the success of that painting, "the largest and most dramatic of all his Martinesque visions," revitalised his reputation and career. Other pictures by him were The Golden Age (c. 1827, exhibited 1831), Rich and Rare Were the Gems She Wore (1837), and The Evening Gun (1848).

Some of Danby's later paintings, like The Woodnymph's Hymn to the Rising Sun (1845), tended toward a calmer, more restrained, more cheerful manner than those in his earlier style; but he returned to his early mode for The Shipwreck (1859). At the 1855 International Exposition (Exposition Universelle (1855)) in Paris, Danby won a prize and critical acclaim for a seascape. In 1861, he was elected a member of the Royal Hibernian Academy, beating Jeremiah Hodges Mulcahy by one vote. He lived his final years at Exmouth in Devon, where he died in 1861. Along with John Martin and J. M. W. Turner, Danby is considered among the leading British artists of the Romantic period.

Both of Danby's sons were landscape painters. The elder, James Francis Danby (1816–75), exhibited at the Royal Academy. "He excelled in depicting sunrise and sunset." The younger, Thomas Danby (1817–86), specialised in watercolours of Welsh scenes. In 1866, the latter was nominated as an Associate of the Royal Academy, but missed election by one vote.

== Gallery ==
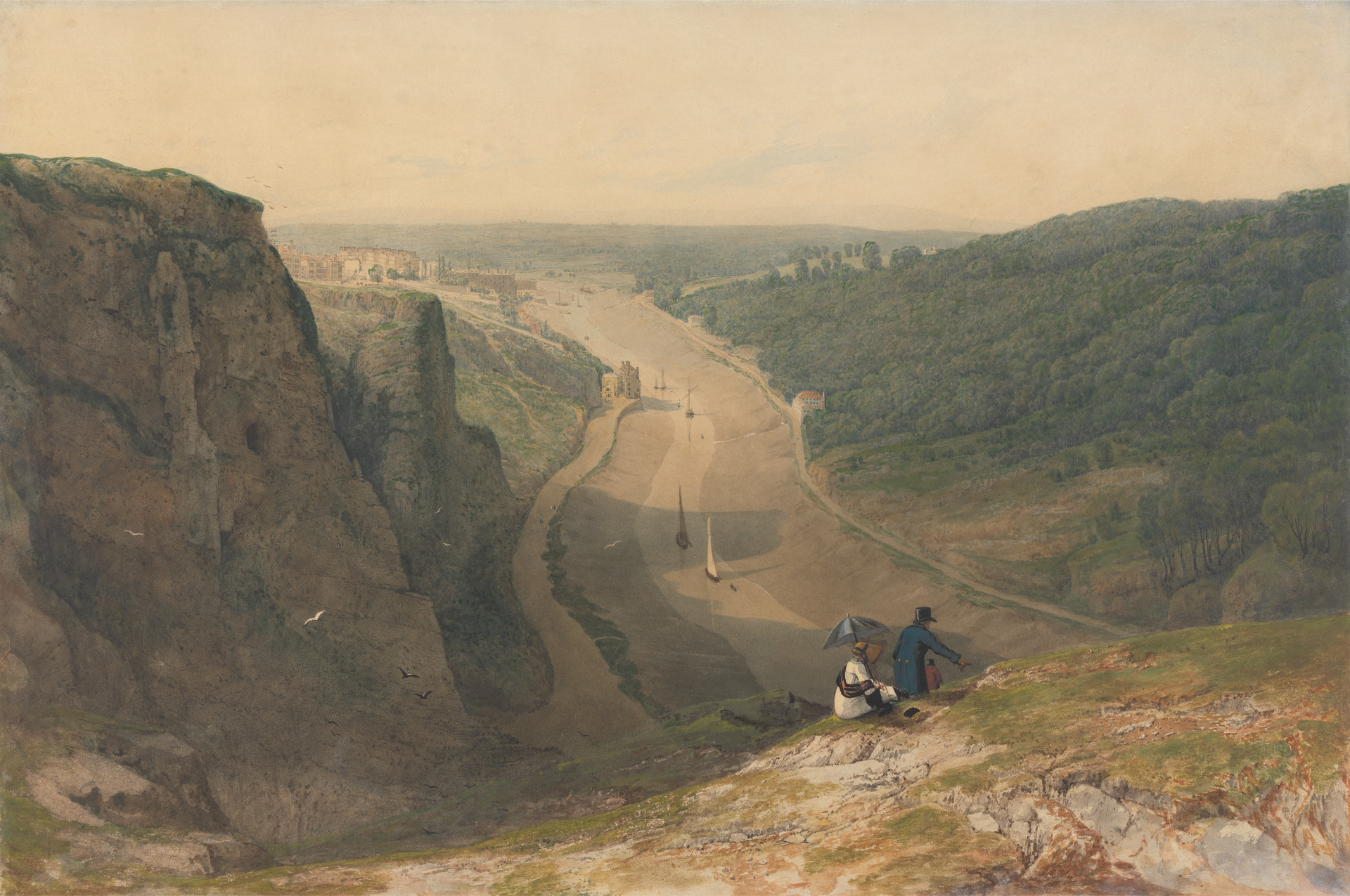
The Avon Gorge, Looking toward Clifton, 1820

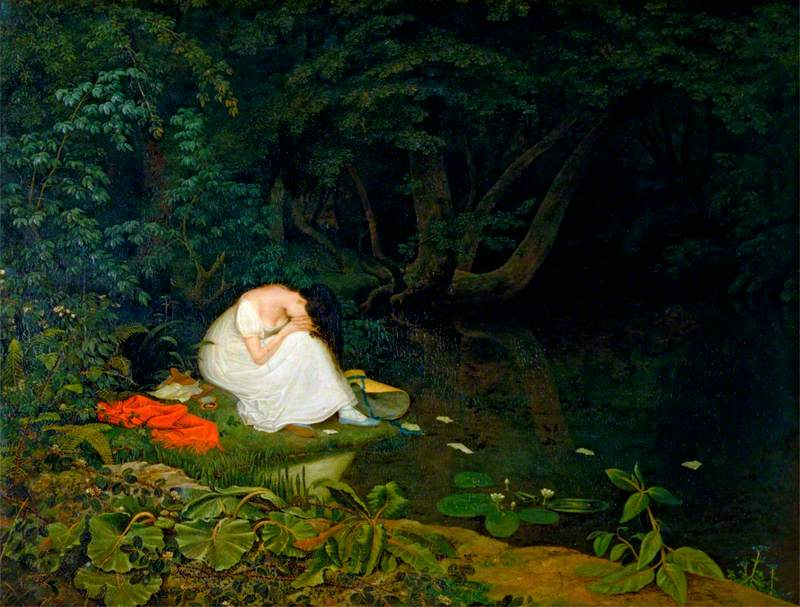
Disappointed Love, 1821

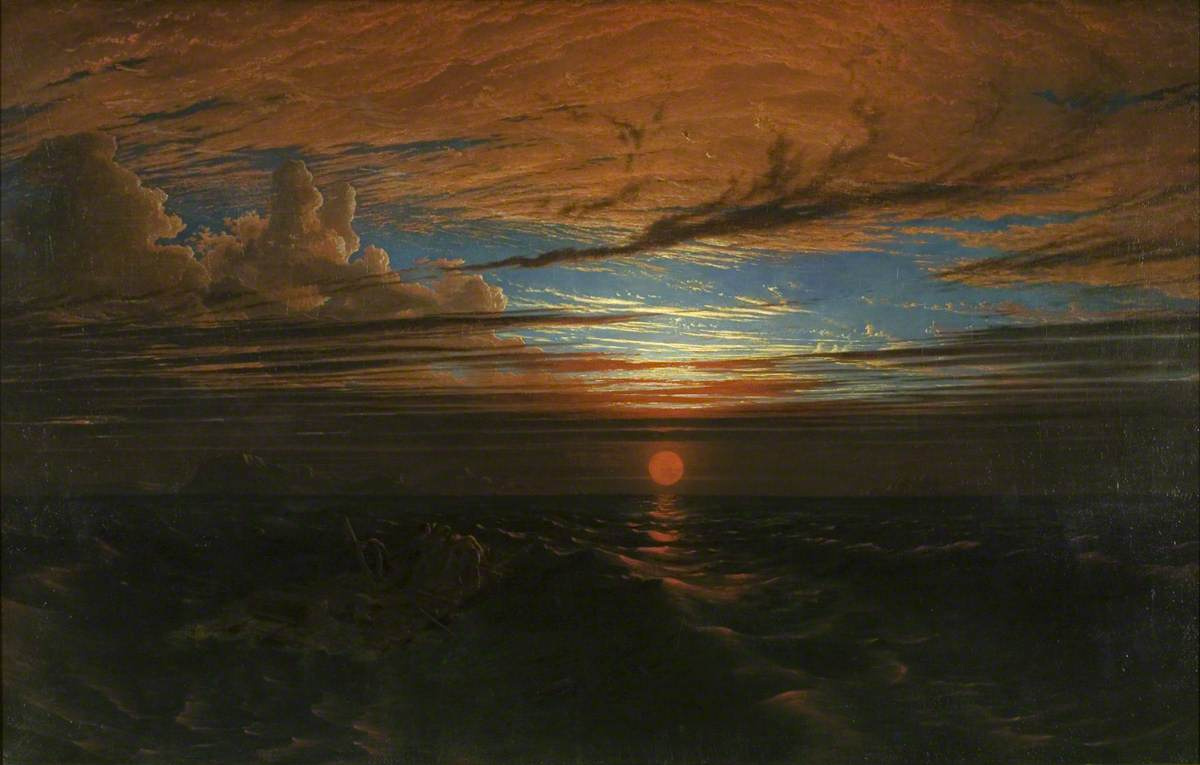
Sunset at Sea after a Storm, 1824

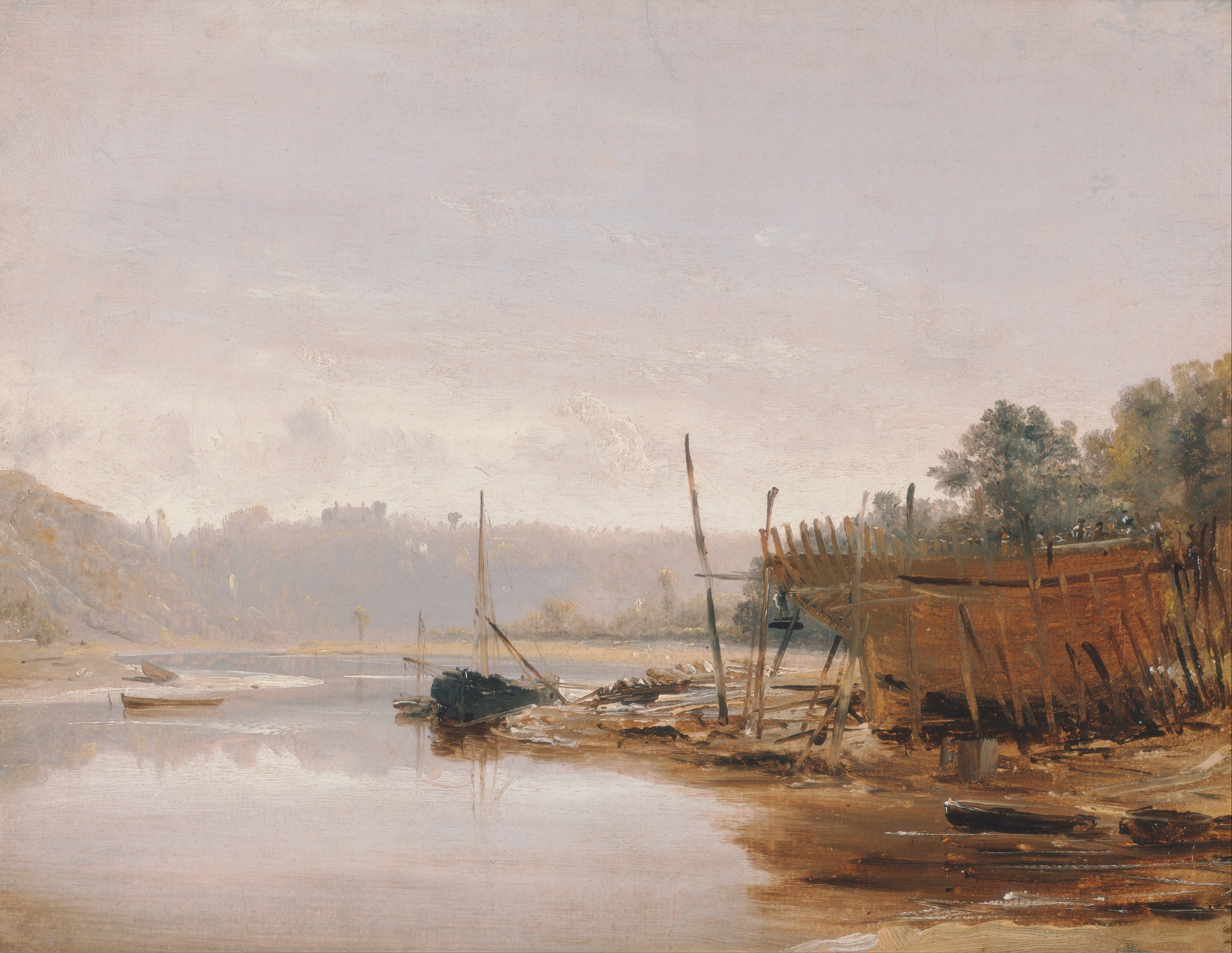
Boat Building near Dinan, 1838

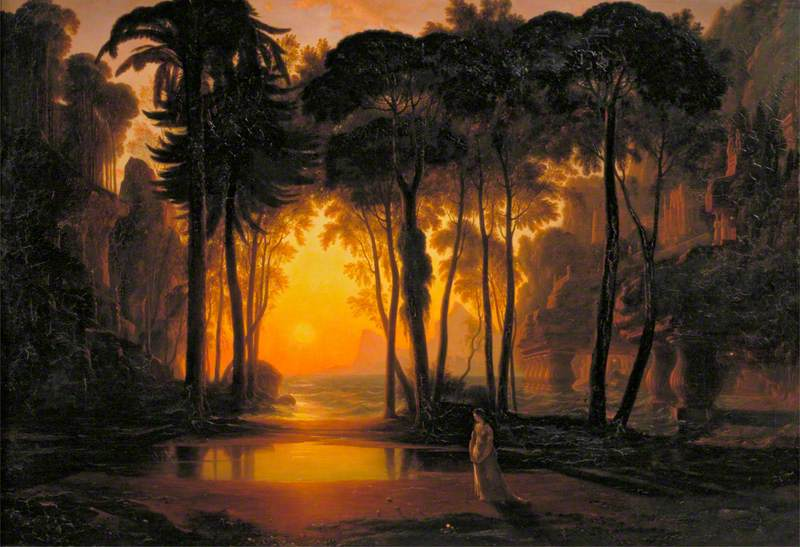
The Enchanted Castle, 1841

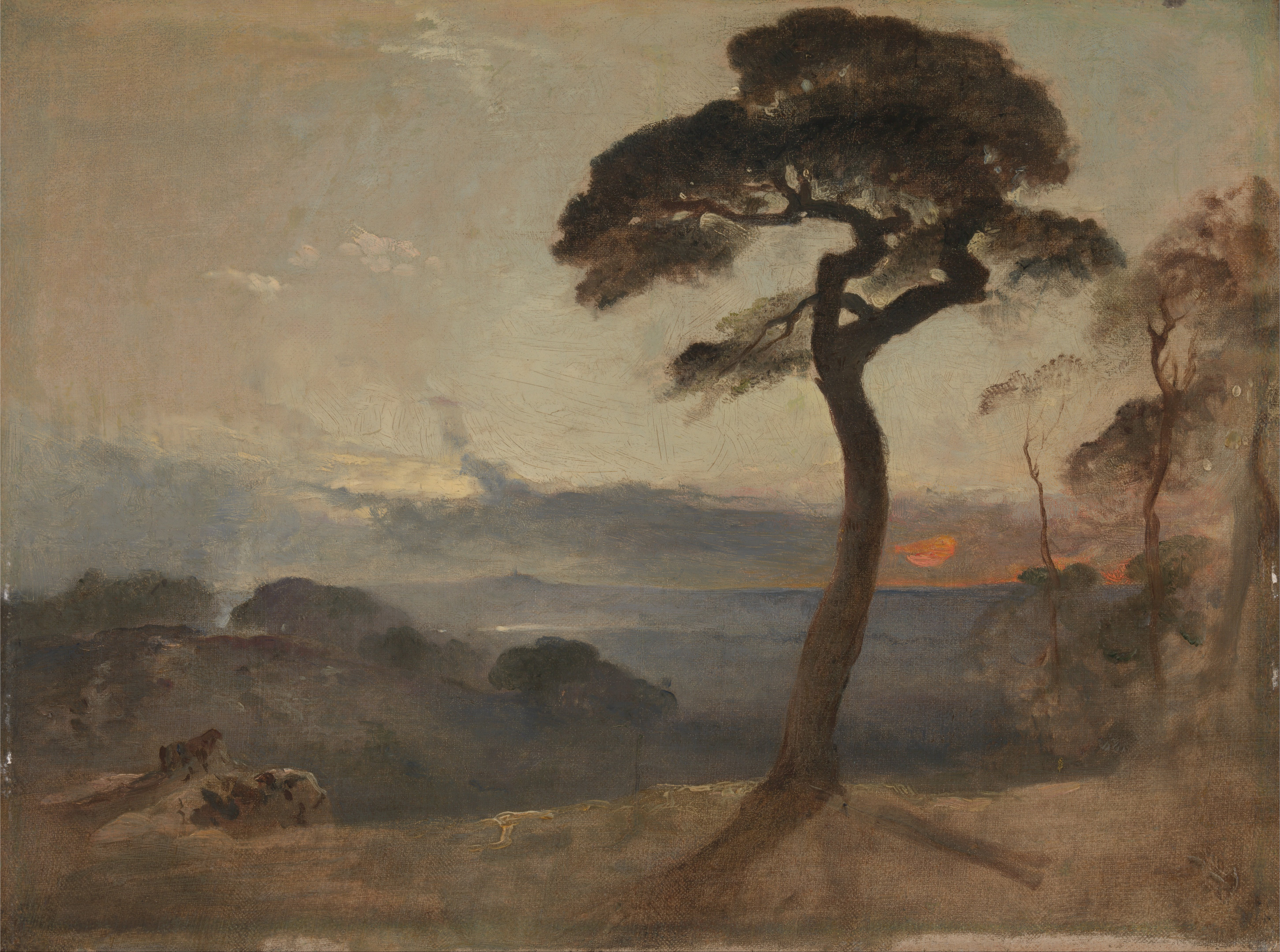
Hampstead Heath, Sunset, 1845

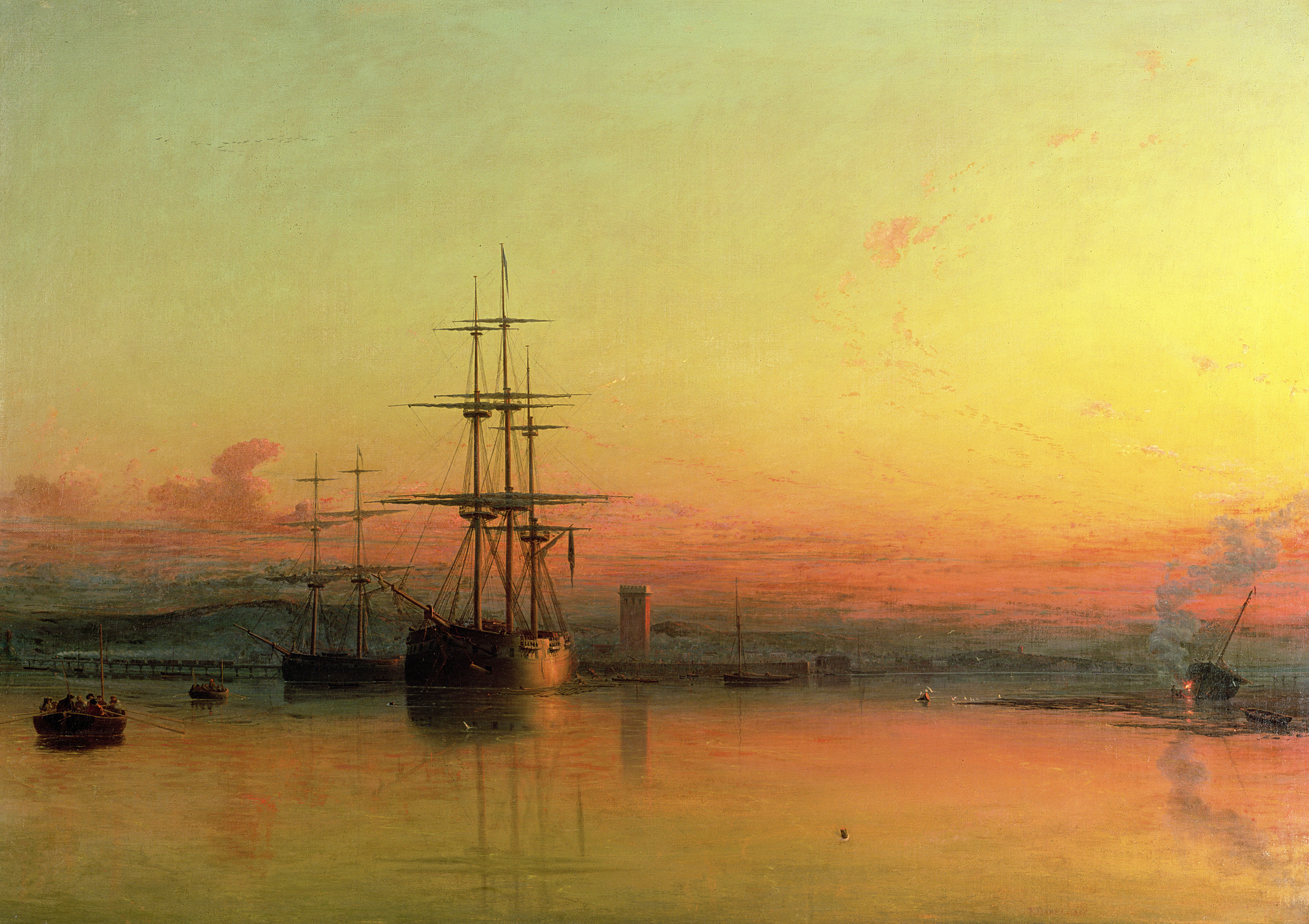
Sunset at the Bight of Exmouth, 1855

== See also ==
- Royal West of England Academy
