= Burgh Walls Camp =

Iron Age hillfort in Somerset, England

- Bower Walls Camp, Burwalls, or Bowre Walls
- Location within Somerset
- 51°27′07″N 2°37′46″W
- Location: Leigh Woods, Somerset, England

History
- Built: Iron Age

Scheduled monument
- Reference no.: 198387

Burgh Walls Camp is a multivallate Iron Age hill fort in the North Somerset district of Somerset, England. The hill fort is situated within Leigh Woods approximately 1.6 miles (2.6 km) north-east from the village of Long Ashton near Bristol, above the banks of the River Avon. The hillfort has some alternative names such as Bower Walls Camp, Burwalls, or Bowre Walls.

Burgh Walls Camp is one of three Iron Age fortifications overlooking the Avon Gorge, the others being Stokeleigh Camp and Clifton Camp on the opposite side of the gorge, on Clifton Down near the Observatory.

== See also ==
- List of hillforts and ancient settlements in Somerset
