= Stokeleigh Camp =

Iron Age promontory fort in Somerset, England

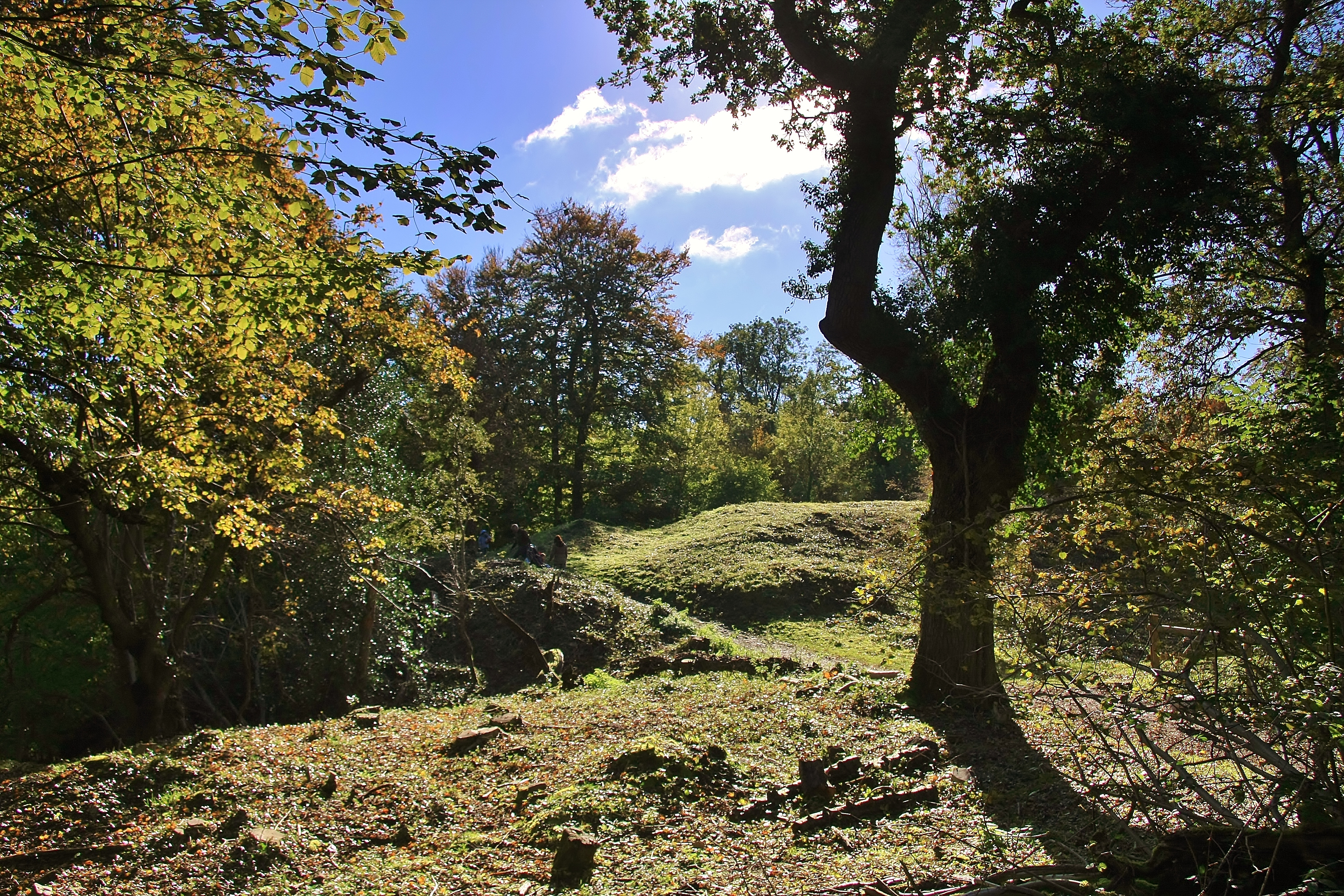

- Location within Somerset
- 51°27′25″N 2°38′15″W
- Location: Leigh Woods, North Somerset, England

History
- Built: Iron Age

Site notes
- Area: 7.5 acres (3.0 ha)

Scheduled monument
- Reference no.: 198375

Stokeleigh Camp is an Iron Age promontory fort in Leigh Woods North Somerset near Bristol, England. The hill fort is one of three Iron Age fortifications overlooking the Avon Gorge, the others being Burgh Walls Camp south of the Nightingale Valley, of which almost no trace remains, and the other being Clifton Down Camp on the opposite side of the gorge, on Clifton Down near the Observatory. A prehistoric road is believed to have connected Stokeleigh Camp with Cadbury Camp near Tickenham in North Somerset.

== Description ==
Stokeleigh Camp is situated on a promontory, and occupies around 7.5 acres (3.0 ha). It was protected by the Avon Gorge to the north and east, by the steeply sloping Nightingale Valley on the south and by three ramparts which increase in size as they move inwards towards the central plateau, with the innermost vallum (a ditch and rampart with a palisade) being over 30 feet (9.1 m) high. It shows evidence of dry walling along most of its length, although this may not be an original feature.

== Archaeological remains ==
Stokeleigh Camp is thought to have been occupied from the late pre-Roman Iron Age, when it was in the area controlled by the Dobunni. Archaeological investigations suggest during the 1st century Belgae tribes may have been present with some of the pottery showing the influence of the Durotriges. There may have been a break in occupation before reuse in the middle to late 2nd century.

In addition to the pottery recovered a possible coin of Gallienus dating from his reign between 253 and 268 has been recovered. An iron-involuted brooch of the La Tène II type has also been found.

It is unclear whether the occupation of Stokeleigh Camp in the 3rd century was for a formal garrison or whether it was just used by "squatters" or as a place of refuge in times of crisis. It has been suggested that Stokeleigh was connected with the Wansdyke, a series of defensive linear earthworks, consisting of a ditch and an embankment running at least from Maes Knoll in Somerset, to the Savernake Forest near Marlborough in Wiltshire, however there is little evidence for this.

It is also possible that the site was occupied in the Middle Ages.

== See also ==
- List of hill forts and ancient settlements in Somerset
