= William West (artist) =

English painter

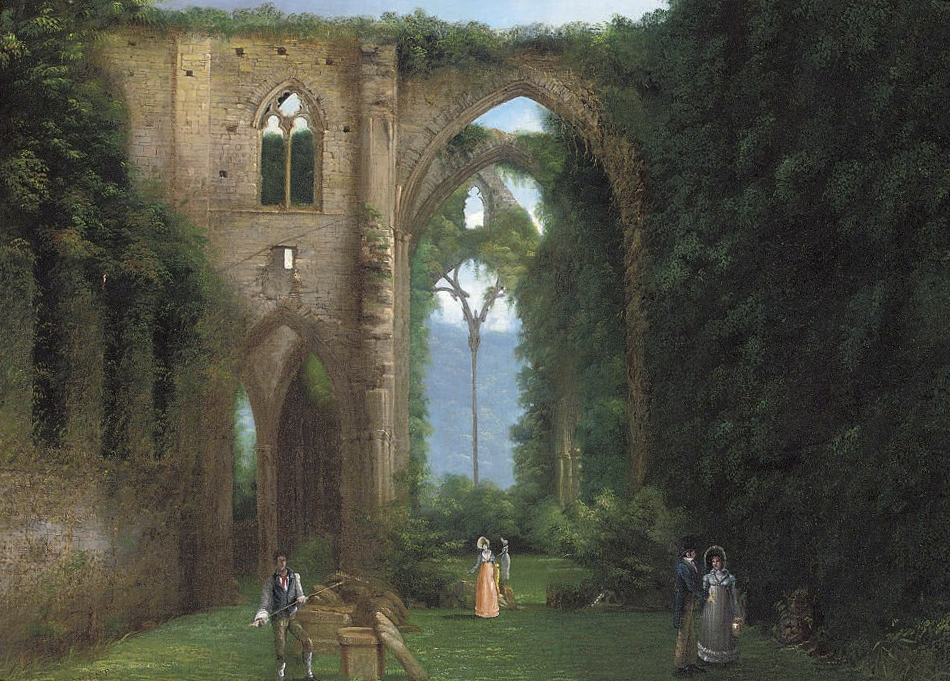
- Newstead Abbey (oil on canvas)
- Born: 1801
- Died: 1861 (aged 59–60)
- Known for: Oil painting, Watercolour

William West (1801–1861) was an English oil painter and watercolourist who was a member of the Bristol School of artists. He was also the builder of the Clifton Observatory at Clifton Down, Bristol.

West arrived in Bristol around 1823. He started exhibiting there in 1823, and from 1824 as well as participating in the sketching activities of the Bristol School he exhibited at the Royal Academy and the British Institution. However, after 1826 he did not exhibit at those two institutions again until 1845. From 1847 he concentrated on Norwegian subjects.

West developed a great interest in optics and engineering. In 1828 he leased a disused windmill on Clifton Down and installed a large telescope in its tower to turn it into an observatory. In 1829 he replaced the telescope with a camera obscura. From 1835 he extended the windmill to create a new observatory, building a large dome to house a rotating telescope. He filled the observatory with a collection of maps, globes and optical instruments. In 1837 he opened a tunnel 61 m (200 ft) in length which he had excavated from the observatory down to St Vincent's Cave on the cliff-face of the Avon Gorge. In 1834 West exhibited The Avon Gorge from the summit of the Observatory, an oil painting from the vantage point that he had built.
