= Leigh Woods, Somerset =

Village in Somerset, England

Coordinates: 51.453°N 2.636°W

Leigh Woods
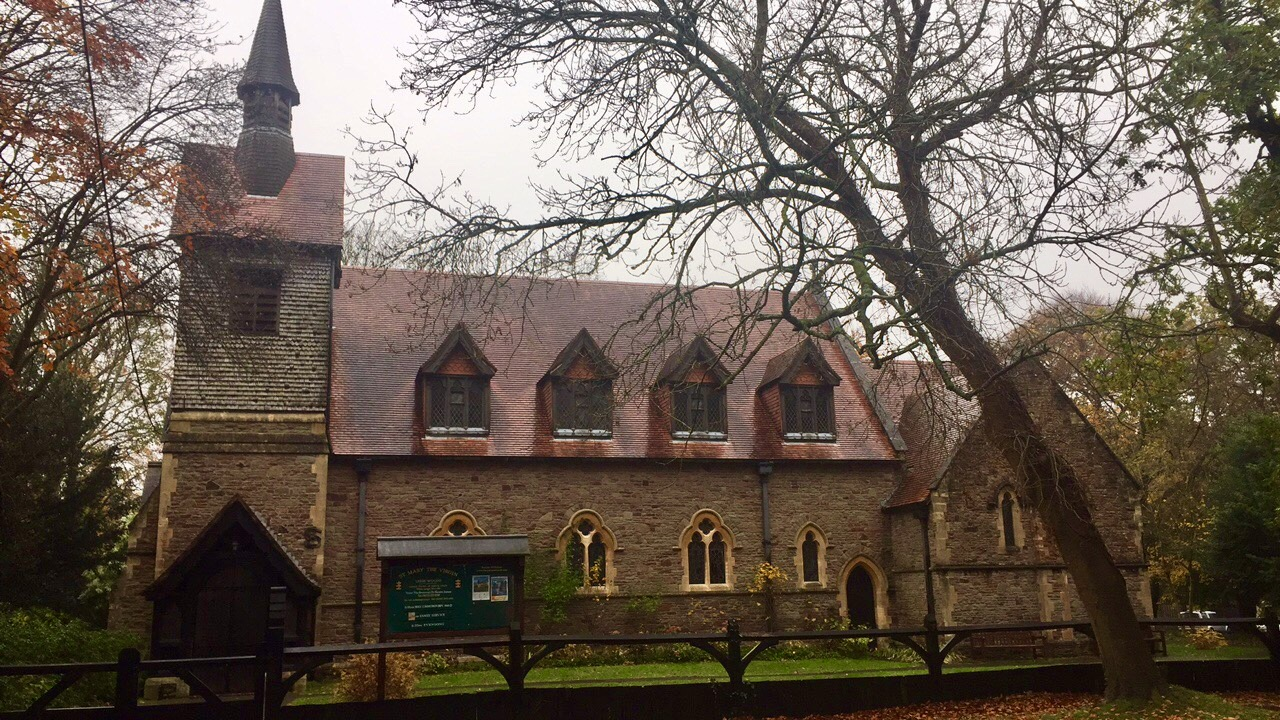
- The Church of St Mary the Virgin

- Location within Somerset
- OS grid reference: ST560729
- Civil parish: Long Ashton
- Unitary authority: North Somerset
- Ceremonial county: Somerset
- Region: South West
- Country: England
- Sovereign state: United Kingdom
- Post town: BRISTOL
- Postcode district: BS8
- Dialling code: 0117
- Police: Avon and Somerset
- Fire: Avon
- Ambulance: South Western
- UK Parliament: North Somerset

Leigh Woods is a village in the North Somerset district of Somerset, England. It is just outside the boundary of the city and county of Bristol.

The village is located to the south of Leigh Woods National Nature Reserve. It is situated at the western end of the Clifton Suspension Bridge, which opened in 1864, making the development of Leigh Woods as an upmarket residential area practicable. Houses in varying styles were built from the mid-1860s until the First World War. Styles adopted included Italian, neo-Jacobean, Scottish baronial, Swiss chalet, Modern glass buildings, Domestic Revival and Arts and Crafts.

The village is in the civil parish of Long Ashton, but in the ecclesiastical parish of Abbots Leigh with Leigh Woods. The church of St Mary the Virgin was designed by the architect John Medland and built in 1891.
