= Sarah Guppy =

English inventor

- Stencil by Stewy from a portrait by Isambard Kingdom Brunel
- Born: Sarah Maria Beach; 5 November 1770; Birmingham, England
- Died: 24 August 1852 (aged 81); Clifton, Bristol, England
- Spouses: Samuel Guppy, m.1795, d.1830; Richard Eyre Coote, m. 1837
- Children: Samuel Guppy, Jr. (1795–1875), Thomas Richard (1797–1882), Sarah Maria Ann (1801– ), Mary Elizabeth (1806–1841), Robert (1808– ), Grace (1809–1838).
- Engineering career
- Discipline: Inventor
- Significant design: A tea or coffee urn that also cooked eggs, the fire hood, a candlestick that made candles burn longer
- Significant advance: Improvements in ship caulking and barnacle prevention

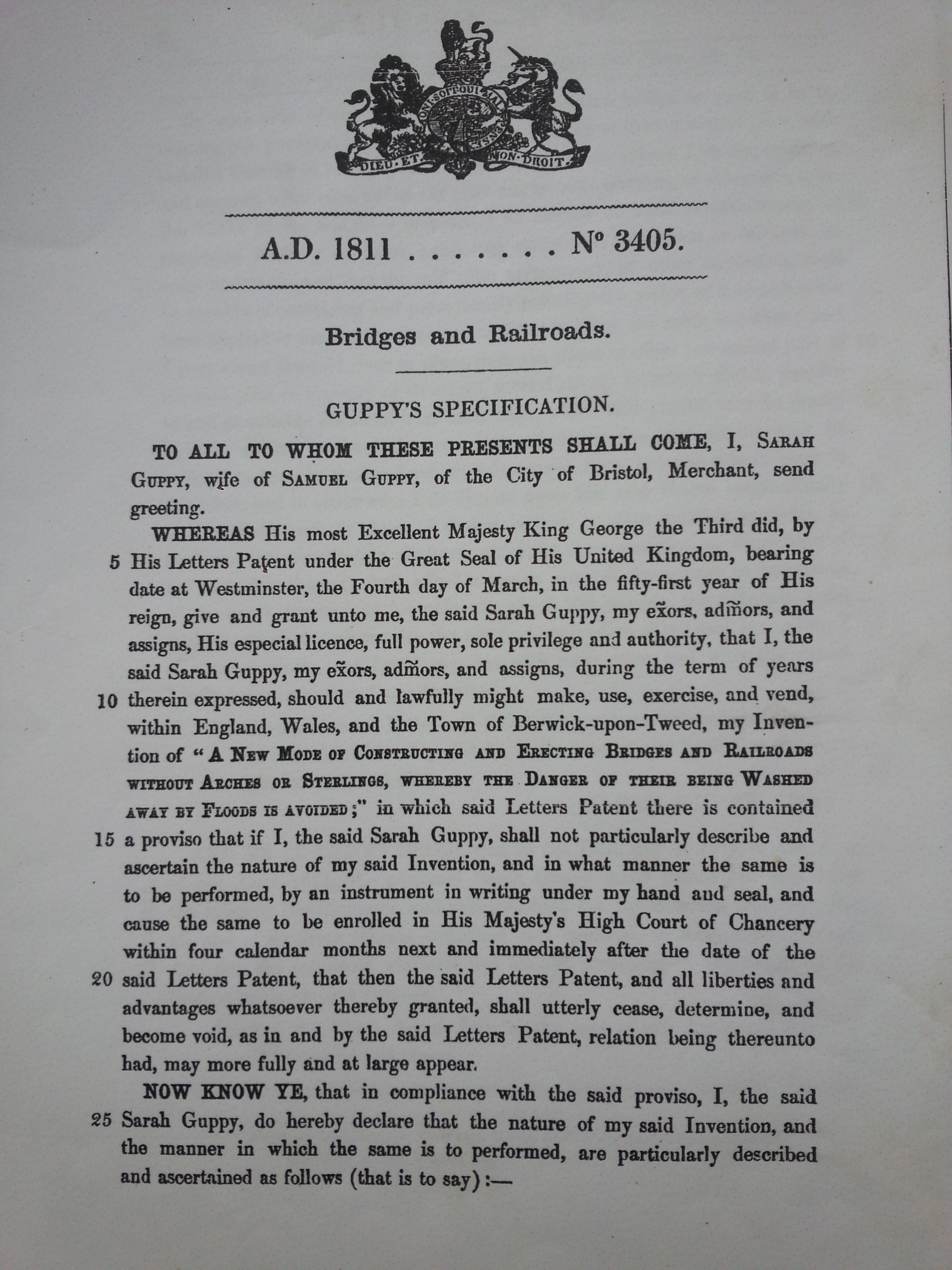
First page of Sarah Guppy's bridge patent of 1811

Sarah Guppy, née Beach (5 November 1770 – 24 August 1852) was an English inventor and the first woman to patent a bridge, in 1811. She developed a range of other domestic and marine products.

== Early history and inventions ==
Sarah Maria Beach was born in Birmingham, England, and baptised in November 1770 as a daughter of Richard and Mary Beach. She married Samuel Guppy in 1795.

In 1811 she patented the first of her inventions, a method of making safe piling for bridges. Thomas Telford asked her for permission to use her patented design for suspension bridge foundations, and she granted it to him free of charge. In particular, it has been claimed that she contributed significantly to the design of Thomas Telford’s Menai Bridge, and waived the fees for Telford’s use of her ideas as personal profit was not her priority.

She patented her ideas for a chain bridge in 1811 (before the announcement of the first competition for a bridge across the Avon Gorge) but this design was never realised.

Following the publication of an erroneous entry in the Oxford Dictionary of National Biography in 2016, now corrected, Guppy was incorrectly credited with the design of the Clifton Suspension Bridge. Brunel’s winning design for a bridge across the Avon Gorge differed from Guppy's patent in several significant ways: it had a deck suspended from flat wrought iron bar links rather than resting on top of chains like Guppy's; and it did not feature riverbed foundations (a key component of Guppy's design) as it was constructed on rock, 75 metres above high tide where the piers were not at risk of damage from water erosion.

As a friend of Isambard Kingdom Brunel and his family she became involved in the Great Western Railway, writing to the directors with ideas and giving her support. In 1841 she wrote a letter recommending planting willows and poplars to stabilise embankments. She continued to offer technical advice despite the fact that, as she wrote, "it is unpleasant to speak of oneself—it may seem boastful particularly in a woman".

Sarah’s early life gave her access to resources that few women of her time had. She grew up in a wealthy family, and was educated and surrounded by innovative thinkers. When she married Samuel Guppy, a machinery builder, Sarah Guppy was surrounded by the trade and learned how to negotiate and run a business, while simultaneously learning about the engineering industry. Samuel had interest in numerous fields, and Sarah wanted to get involved. Samuel supported his wife in taking charge of negotiations for his manufacturing business deals. It was clear that Sarah Guppy’s interest in engineering was well supported by her husband, who cared for her and did not treat her as secondary or less capable of entering a field that so many women were historically blocked off from.

== Patents and publications ==
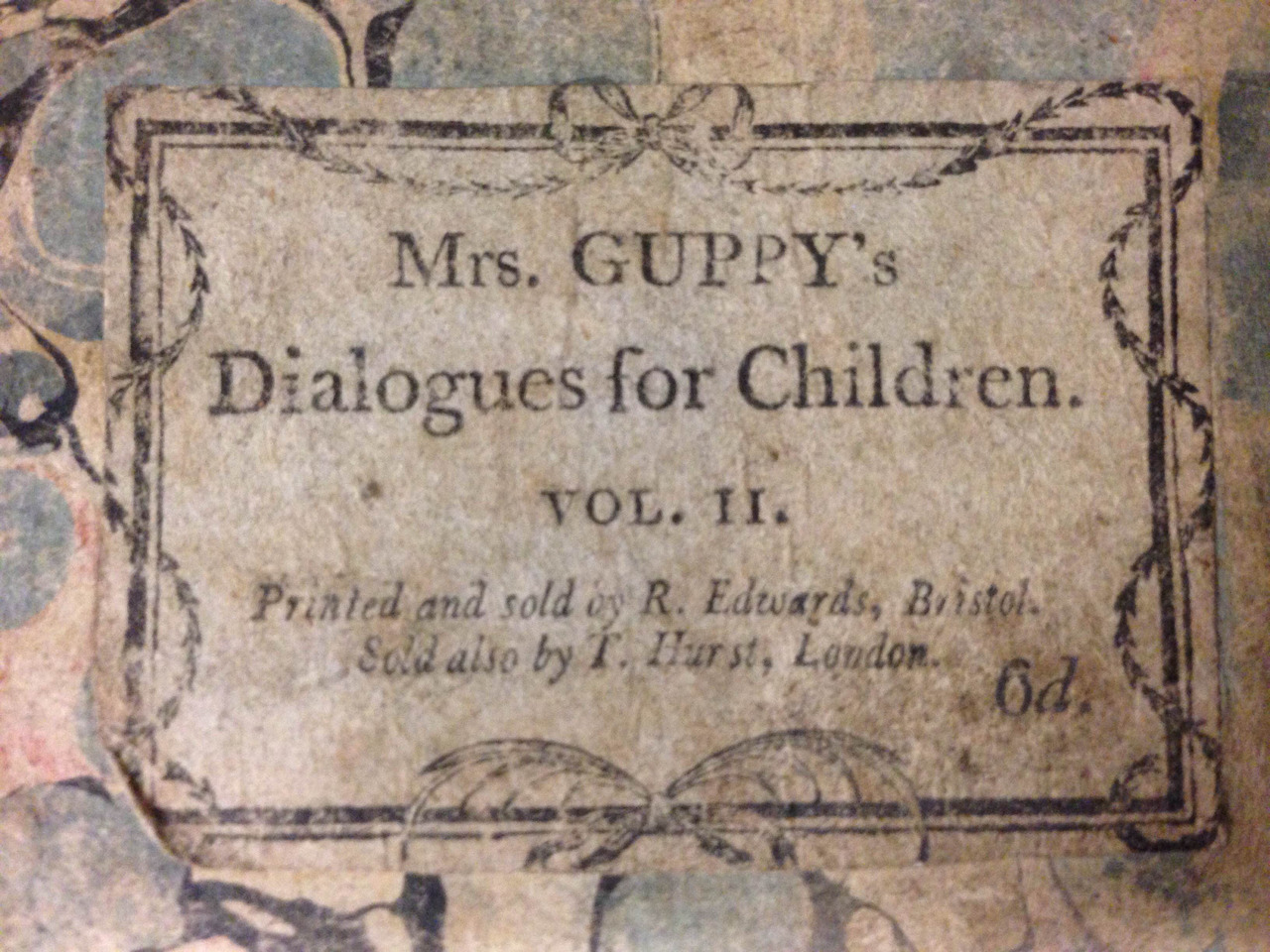
Cover of Dialogues for Children, 1800

The Guppy family took out 10 patents in the first half of the nineteenth century, including a method of keeping ships free of barnacles that led to a government contract worth £40,000. Other inventions included a bed with built-in exercise equipment, exhibited at The Great Exhibition, a device for a tea or coffee urn which would cook eggs in the steam as well as having a small dish to keep toast warm, and a device for "improvements in caulking ships, boats and other vessels." In later life she wrote The Cottagers and Labourers Friend and Dialogues for Children, invented the fire hood or Cook's Comforter, and patented a new type of candlestick that enabled candles to burn longer.

A barrier to Sarah Guppy’s success as an inventor was that she could not file for a patent under her own name. During this period, patents were considered valuable, as they contained intellectual property (HLB, 2019). She patented “New Mode of Constructing and Erecting Bridges and Railroads without Arches,” placing her well ahead of her time, and seven years before Thomas Telford’s start on the suspension bridge (HLB, 2019). When Guppy granted Telford permission to use her design and ideas for free, there is little evidence that he or other engineers ever acknowledged her invention and gave her due credit (HLB, 2019). Sarah Guppy has been overlooked for her work in bridge engineering advances, because her contributions as a woman were taken over by prominent male engineers. Sarah Guppy was active in the social sphere, and philanthropic contributions to education and female education. She published pamphlets on public health issues, agriculture, education, and animal welfare. She advocated for vulnerable groups, using her platform and voice to encourage progress and positive change towards a more equitable society.

== Marriage and family ==
After marrying Bristol merchant Samuel Guppy they lived in Queen Square and Prince Street. Guppy played a leading part in the Bristol and Clifton social scene. The couple had six children, including Thomas Richard, who with older brother Samuel operated the Friars Sugar Refinery in Bristol (1826–42) before becoming an engineer and associate of Brunel, contributing significantly to the design of SS Great Western and SS Great Britain. Brunel painted a portrait of the younger Sarah Guppy c. 1836.

== Later life ==
In 1837 the widowed Sarah, now 67, married Richard Eyre Coote, 28 years her junior.(Mason, 2022). For a while they lived at Arnos Court, Brislington, but Richard ran through his rich wife's money at a rapid rate (Pollard, 2021), spending on horses and neglecting her. Sarah moved into 7 Richmond Hill, Clifton, in 1842. She bought the land opposite the house for the benefit of Clifton residents and it still remains green space.

She left Richard Coote and lived solo before dying (HLB, 2019). She died at age 81 in 1852 with only 200 pounds to her name.

== Legacy and impact on modern society ==
Female innovators in the 19th century are often overlooked, because even to enter the innovation space in the first place, these women had to have more than just an idea. Sarah Guppy used her resources to the maximum, and combined with her motivation, drive, and curiosity. She was eccentric and did not let gender roles take away from her opportunities to take action on her ideas and make an impact on society. Today, her early suspension bridge design has paved the way for modern infrastructure, and her ideas formed the baseline to be built upon. The Clifton Suspension Bridge would not exist without Sarah Guppy, and her modesty to not take full credit because of her passion to make a positive change for the world.
