= Sarah Ann Henley =

Woman who survived jumping off the Clifton Suspension Bridge

- Born: 8 June 1862
- Died: 31 March 1948 (aged 85)
- Resting place: Avon View Cemetery
- Spouse: Edward Lane

Sarah Ann Henley (8 July 1862 – 31 March 1948) was a barmaid from Easton, Bristol, who became famous in 1885 for surviving a suicide attempt by jumping from the Clifton Suspension Bridge, a fall of almost 75 metres (246 ft).

== Attempted suicide ==
On Friday, 8 May 1885, Thomas Stevens, resident inspector for the Clifton Suspension Bridge, reported that Henley had climbed over the railings and on to the parapet. Before anyone could reach her, she had thrown herself off. Witnesses claimed that a billowing effect created by an updraft of air beneath her crinoline skirt slowed the pace of her fall, misdirecting her away from the water and instead toward the muddy banks of the Bristol side of the Avon River. Although there is no evidence that the wind or the skirt saved Henley from the fall, the story has nevertheless become a local Bristol legend.

An article dated 16 May 1885 in the City Notes of a local newspaper, the Bristol Magpie, reports as follows:

The rash act was the result of a lovers quarrel. A young man, a porter on the Great Western Railway, determined to break off the engagement, wrote a letter to the young woman announcing his intention. This preyed on the girl's mind, and she, in a state of despair, rushed to end her life by the fearful leap from the Suspension Bridge.

After her landing in the thick mud of low-tide, two passers-by, John Williams and George Drew, rushed to her assistance. They found her in a state of severe shock, but alive, and escorted her to the refreshment rooms of the nearby railway station, where she was attended to by a Doctor Griffiths and a Detective Robertson, who had also observed the incident. Despite her being conscious and able to answer questions, the doctor insisted that she be escorted to the Bristol Infirmary urgently.

Detective Robertson sought the assistance of a local cabman, who refused on the grounds that transporting her covered in filth would make his cab dirty. Despite an offer of payment and stressing that she could die if she was not treated urgently, he stubbornly refused stating "I don't care – let her die".

With no other option, a stretcher was sought from the local Clifton Police Station. Though it was a journey of more than an hour, she was carried to the Infirmary, where she was treated for severe shock and internal injuries. While she was in hospital slowly recovering, the story of her misfortune and survival quickly spread and numerous proposals of marriage and fame were offered.

The cabman later defended his actions in a letter to the Bristol Times & Mirror, stating that he had only just had his cab cleaned and repaired, during which it was off the road and he was unable to earn a living. He called for a fund to be set up to assist cabbies in these circumstances and pointed out that the corporation should have had an ambulance available for similar incidents.

== Personal life ==
Henley never went back to the Rising Sun in Ashton where she was working as a barmaid. On 26 January 1900, she married Edward Lane, who worked at a Bristol wagon works.

Over time, Henley ceased being self-conscious about the incident. She kept as souvenirs the photographs of the two children, Ruby and Elsie Brown, who in September 1896 survived being thrown off the bridge by their deranged father.

Henley died aged 85 on 31 March 1948, and was buried on 6 April at Avon View Cemetery.
