= Leigh Woods National Nature Reserve =

National nature reserve near Bristol, England

Coordinates: 51°27′47″N 2°38′21″W

Leigh Woods
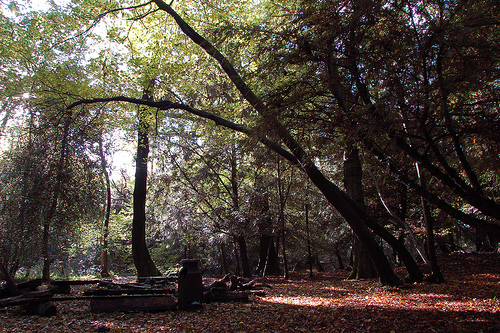
- The woods in early autumn

- Location within Somerset
- Type: Open access woodland
- Location: North Somerset, England
- Area: 2 square kilometres (490 acres)
- Operator: National Trust, Forestry England
- Status: Open all year

Leigh Woods is a 2-square-kilometre (0.77 sq mi) area of woodland on the south-west side of the Avon Gorge, close to the Clifton Suspension Bridge, within North Somerset opposite the English city of Bristol and north of the Ashton Court estate, of which it formed a part. Stokeleigh Camp, a hillfort thought to have been occupied from the third century BC to the first century AD and possibly also in the Middle Ages, lies within the reserve on the edge of the Nightingale Valley. On the bank of the Avon, within the reserve, are quarries for limestone and celestine which were worked in the 18th and 19th centuries are now derelict.

In 1909 part of the woodland was donated to the National Trust by George Alfred Wills, to prevent development of the city beside the gorge following the building of the Leigh Woods suburb. Areas not owned by the National Trust have since been taken over by Forestry England. Rare trees include multiple species of Sorbus with at least nine native and four imported species. Bristol rockcress (Arabis scabra) which is unique to the Avon Gorge can be seen flowering in April; various species of orchids and western spiked speedwell (Veronica spicata) are common in June and July. It is a national nature reserve and is included in the Avon Gorge Site of Special Scientific Interest.

== Topography ==
The woods, which cover an area of 2 square kilometres (0.77 sq mi), are on a ridge which mainly consists of limestone, with some sandstone which runs from Clifton to Clevedon, 10 miles (16 km) away on the Bristol Channel coast. At the southern end of the woods is Nightingale Valley (one of several thus named in the area), a dry valley which is cut into the side of the gorge. Its area slopes from the highest point nearly opposite the north gate of Ashton Court to the River Avon beside the western buttress of the Clifton Suspension Bridge. The woods are on the Monarch's Way long-distance footpath.

== History ==
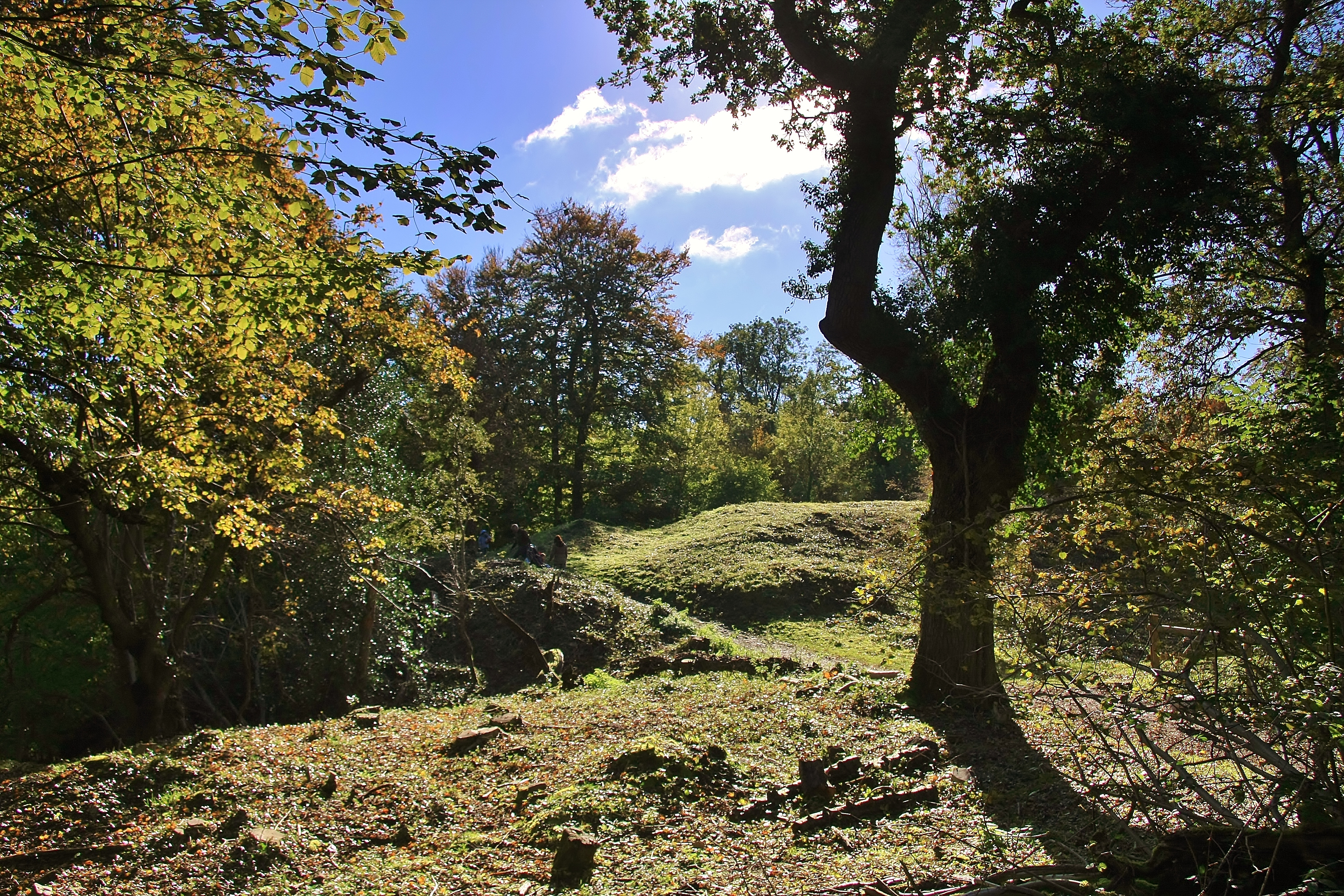
Stokeleigh Camp

Within Leigh Woods is Stokeleigh Camp, a hill fort thought to have been occupied from the third century BC to the first century AD and also in the Middle Ages. It is situated on a promontory, bounding the north flank of the Nightingale Valley and occupying around 7.5 acres (3.0 ha). Stokeleigh Camp is thought to have been occupied from the late pre-Roman Iron Age, when it was in the area controlled by the Dobunni. Archaeological investigations suggest during the 1st century Belgae tribes may have been present with some of the pottery showing the influence of the Durotriges. There may have been a break in occupation before reuse in the middle to late 2nd century. In addition to the pottery recovered a possible coin of Gallienus dating from his reign between 253 and 268 has been recovered. An iron-involuted brooch of the La Tène II type has also been found. It is unclear whether the occupation of Stokeleigh Camp in the 3rd century was for a formal garrison or whether it was just used by "squatters" or as a place of refuge in times of crisis. Stokeleigh might have been connected with the Wansdyke, a series of defensive linear earthworks, consisting of a ditch and an embankment running at least from Maes Knoll in Somerset, to the Savernake Forest near Marlborough in Wiltshire; however, there is little evidence for this. It is also possible that the site was occupied in the Middle Ages.

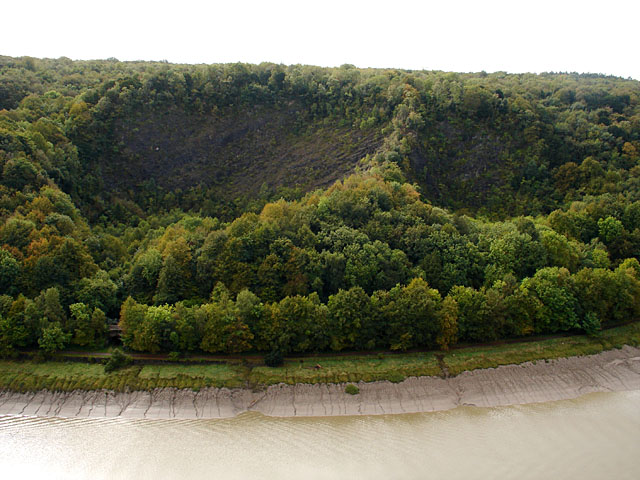
One of the quarries, seen from The Downs

North of Stokeleigh Camp are a series of limestone and mineral quarries, overlooking the River Avon, which are now disused. In the late 19th and early 20th centuries this had an important celestine quarry and a tramway which linked it to a dock on the Avon; both are now derelict. The area has in recent years been restored as an arboretum. At the northern end of the woods is Paradise Bottom. This is included in the Leigh Court Estate and was part of the ground laid out by Humphry Repton for Philip John Miles. Some of the first plantings of the giant redwood (Sequoiadendron giganteum) and the Weymouth pine (Pinus strobus), among other "exotics" imported to the UK, were made here by Sir William Miles in the 1860s.

To the south of the woods is an affluent suburb of Bristol also known as Leigh Woods. It is situated at the western end of the Clifton Suspension Bridge, which opened in 1864, making the development of Leigh Woods as an upmarket residential area practicable. Houses in varying styles were built from the mid-1860s until the First World War.

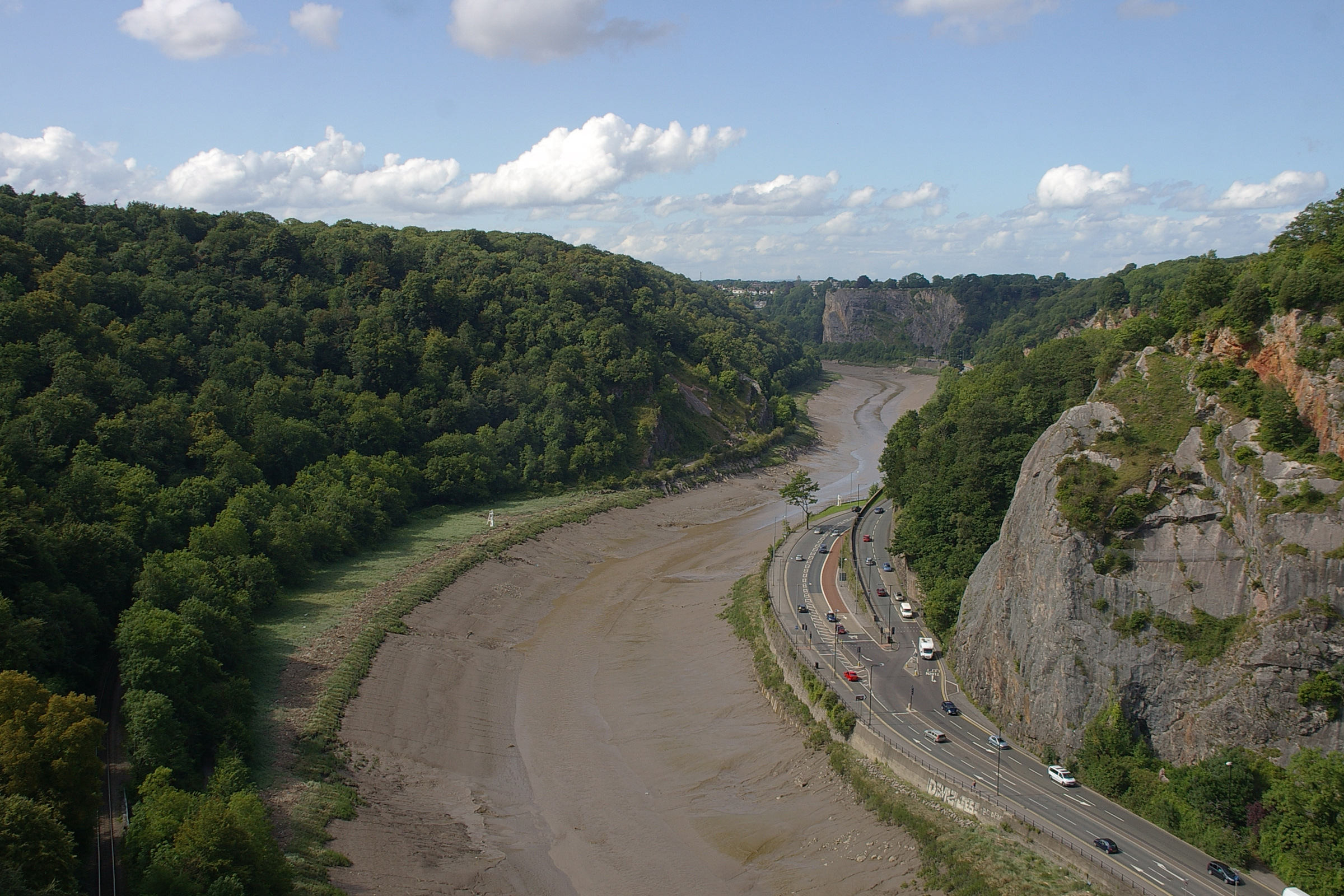
The Avon Gorge with Leigh Woods and the Portishead Railway visible on the left

In 1857 the mutilated body of a murdered woman was found in Nightingale Valley; John Beale was hanged at Taunton for the crime in January 1858. Another violent death occurred in 1948 when George Henry Chinnock, who had been living in the woods, was found with head injuries.

One of the development plans for Leigh Woods, 1862. Shows intended development of Nightingale Valley and Stokeleigh Camp (right of map).

In 1862 Sir Greville Smyth of Ashton Court, who owned the estate, proposed to develop Leigh Woods as a housing estate. There were various proposals to develop 170 acres of the site, erecting up to 850 houses. This included converting the path down Nightingale Valley into a road and building over Stokeleigh Camp. The plans prompted a public outcry and led to the formation of the Leigh Woods Land Company. It sought to save the valley and the woods north of it in return for developing areas near Clifton Suspension Bridge (opened 1864).

In 1909 part of the woodland was donated to the National Trust by the tobacco company owner George Alfred Wills. He did this to prevent housing development on the western side of the gorge as Bristol grew in size and population. In 1974 the Ministry of Agriculture, Fisheries and Food bought the woodland associated with the Leigh Court estate. Areas not owned by the National Trust have since been taken over by Forestry England.

The Portishead Railway runs close to the river at the bottom of the woods. It was opened on 18 April 1867, but closed on 3 April 1981. The Great Western Railway built a small station with the aim of attracting tourists to the area; Nightingale Valley Halt was not very successful and was only in use for less than five years, from 9 July 1928 until 12 September 1932. The line was reopened for freight traffic as far as Royal Portbury Dock on 21 December 2001 and local councils are proposing to reintroduce a passenger service to Portishead as part of their MetroWest plans, although this would not happen before 2019.

In 1957 a Filton-based RAF Vampire jet from 501 Squadron crashed into Leigh Woods. The pilot, Flying officer John Greenwood, was killed after he flew under the deck of the suspension bridge while performing a victory roll.

Small mountain biking circuits are present in the woods and the area is a popular walking and rock climbing area for Bristolians.

== Flora and fauna ==
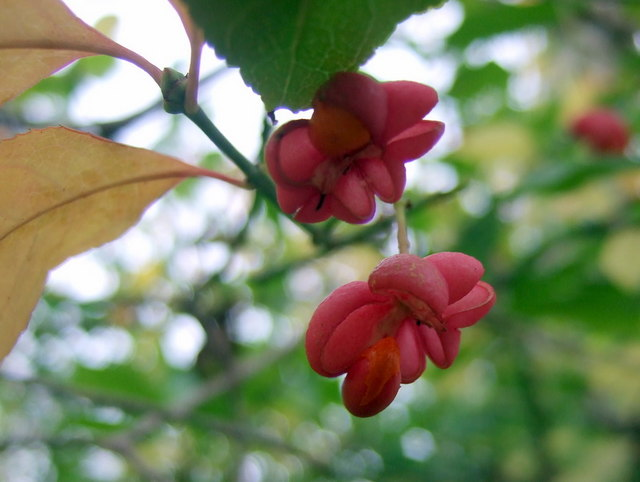
Berries of the Spindle (Euonymus europaeus) seen in Leigh Woods

Because of the rare flora and fauna, the woods have been included in the Avon Gorge Site of Special Scientific Interest, which received the designation in 1952, and 140 hectares (350 acres) has been designated as a national nature reserve.

The south part of the woods is an area of former pasture woodland with old pollards, mainly oak and some small-leaved lime. To the north, the area comprises ancient woodland of old coppice with standards and contains a rich variety of trees. Rare trees include Bristol whitebeam (Sorbus bristoliensis) and wild service tree (Sorbus torminalis). There are multiple species of Sorbus within the woods with at least nine native and four imported species, making it one of the most important sites in Britain for this tree. Birds which live in the woods include the raven (Corvus) and peregrine falcon (Falco peregrinus). Many butterflies and moths can be seen in summer including the white-letter hairstreak (Satyrium w-album).

On the steep grassy slopes above the River Avon, Bristol rockcress (Arabis scabra) which is unique to the Avon Gorge can be seen flowering in April; orchids and western spiked speedwell (Veronica spicata) are common in June and July. In autumn the woodland hosts over 300 species of fungi. Bilberry, a scarce plant in the Bristol area, is found in Leigh Woods, as is the parasitic plant yellow bird's-nest (Monotropa hypopitys). Lady orchid (Orchis purpurea) was discovered here in 1990, in Nightingale Valley; there is doubt as to whether this was a wild plant or an introduction. Green-flowered helleborine (Epipactis phyllanthes) is found on the western side of the gorge, in a wooded area next to the towpath below Leigh Woods.

== Bibliography ==
- Awdry, W. (1990). Encyclopaedia of British Railway Companies. Patrick Stephens Ltd. ISBN 978-1852600495.
- Butt, R.J.V. (1995). The Directory of Railway Stations. Patrick Stephens Ltd. ISBN 978-1852605087.
- Carter, E. (1959). An Historical Geography of the Railways of the British Isles. Cassell. ASIN B000WSRHU6.
- Griffiths, Gerald (2012). The Autobiography of an Ex-Grenadier Guardsman: Gerald Griffiths His Life and Military Background. S.l: Authorhouse. ISBN 978-1-4772-4721-1.
- Myles, Sarah (2000). The Flora of the Bristol Region. Pisces. ISBN 978-1874357186.
- Way, Lewis J. U., An Account of the Leigh Woods, in the Parish of Long Ashton, County of Somerset (Bristol and Gloucestershire Archaeological Society, 1913)
- Whittell, Giles (2007). Spitfire Women of World War II. London: Harper Perennial. ISBN 978-0-00-723535-3.
