= Clifton Observatory =

Observatory in Bristol, England

The Observatory
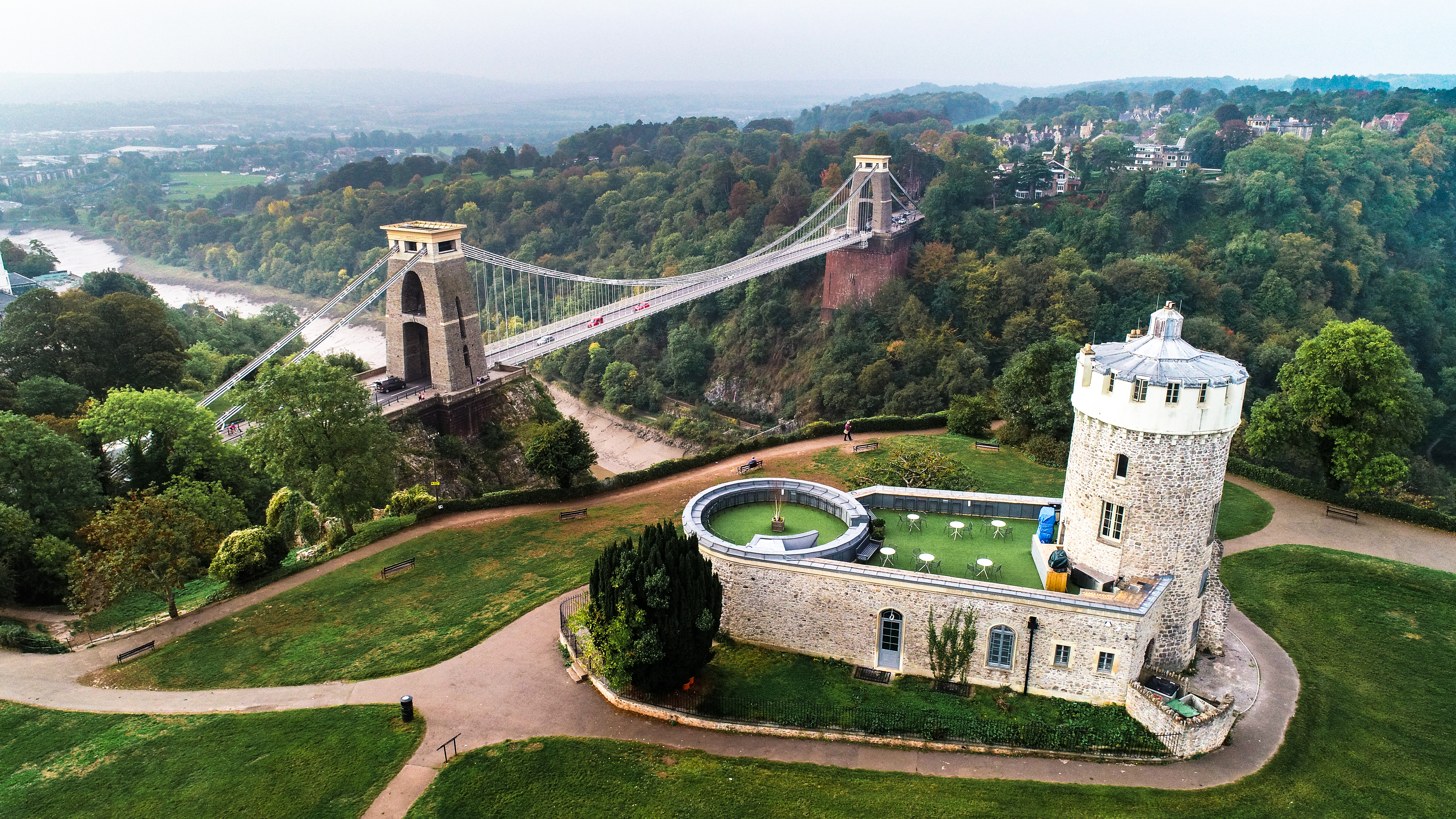
- Aerial photo of the observatory showing the relationship to the Clifton Suspension Bridge

- Location within Bristol

General information
- Location: Bristol, England
- Coordinates: 51.45663°N 2.62640°W
- Completed: 1766

Website
- cliftonobservatory.com

Listed Building – Grade II*
- Official name: Clifton Observatory
- Designated: 4 March 1977
- Reference no.: 1282362

Clifton Observatory (grid reference ST564733) is a former mill, now used as an observatory, located on Clifton Down, close to the Clifton Suspension Bridge in Bristol, England.

== History ==
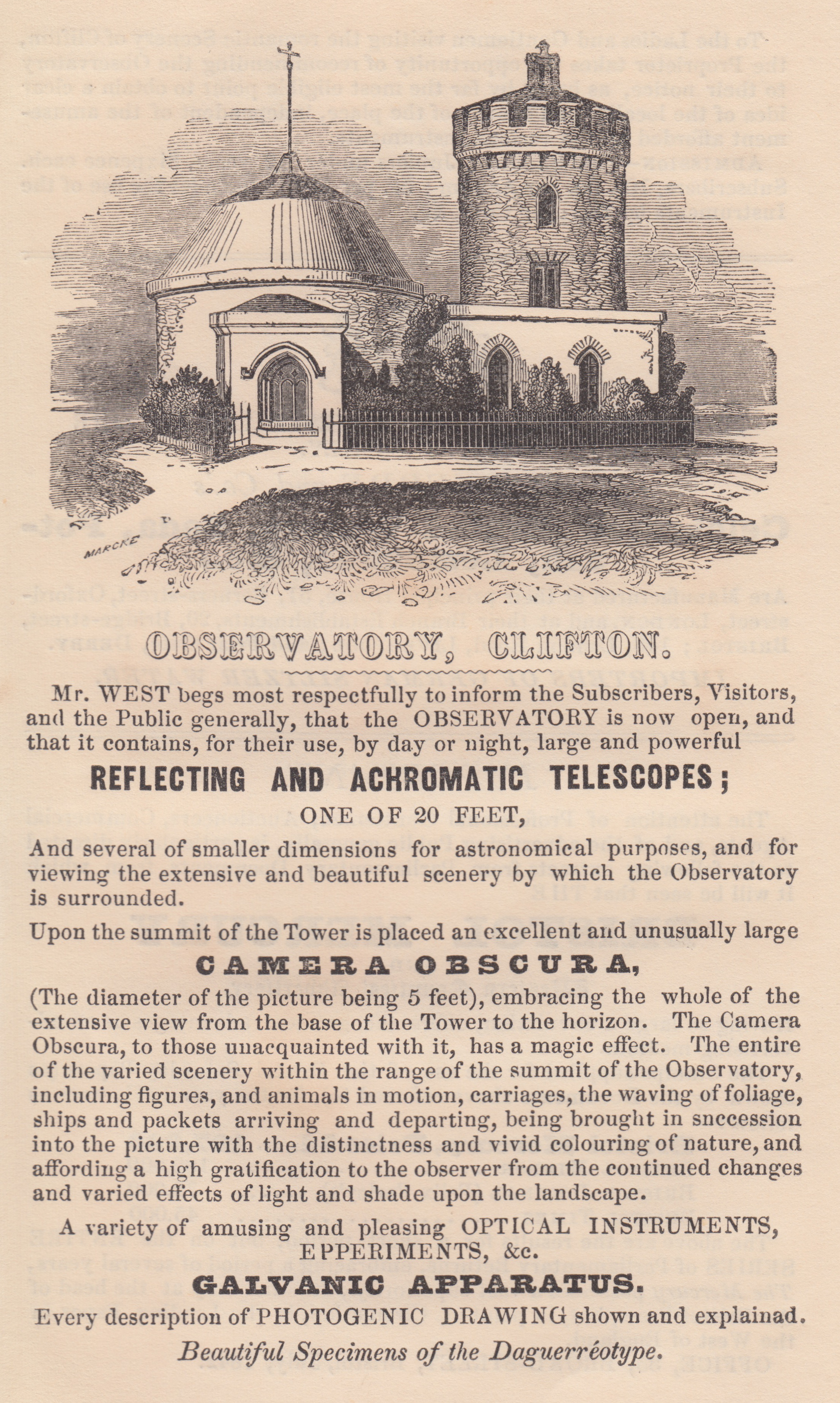
Advert for the Clifton Observatory, 1842

The building was erected, with the permission of the Society of Merchant Venturers, as a windmill for corn in 1766 and later converted to the grinding of snuff, when it became known as 'The Snuff Mill'. This was damaged by fire on 30 October 1777, when the sails were left turning during a gale and caused the equipment to catch alight. It was then derelict for 52 years until in 1828 William West, an artist, rented the old mill, for 5 shillings (25p) a year, as a studio.

By 1842 West had converted the building into an observatory incorporating reflecting and achromatic telescopes and a camera obscura, charging one shilling for visitors or an annual membership of 10s. 6d.

In 1977 the Merchant Venturers sold the observatory to Honorbrook Inns; however, they were obliged to maintain public access to the camera obscura whose ownership was retained by the Merchant Venturers.

That same year it was designated by English Heritage as a Grade II* listed building and was on the Buildings at Risk Register from 2011 until its removal from the list in 2014. In February 2015, the observatory was bought by Ian Johnson, a local Clifton-born entrepreneur, who also owns the Clifton Rocks Railway.

== Camera obscura ==
West installed telescopes and a camera obscura, which were used by artists of the Bristol School to draw the Avon Gorge and Leigh Woods on the opposite side. Many examples of these paintings can be seen in Bristol City Museum and Art Gallery. The pictures which originated from images within the camera obscura he called 'photogenic drawing' and were based on the work of William Fox Talbot.

A 5-inch (13 cm) convex lens and sloping mirror were installed on the top of the tower; these project the panoramic view vertically downward into the darkened room below. Visitors view the true image (not a mirror image) on a fixed circular table 5 feet (1.5 m) in diameter, with a concave metal surface, and turn the mirror by hand to change the direction of view. It has been placed on the top of Clifton Tower since 1828.

== Cave ==
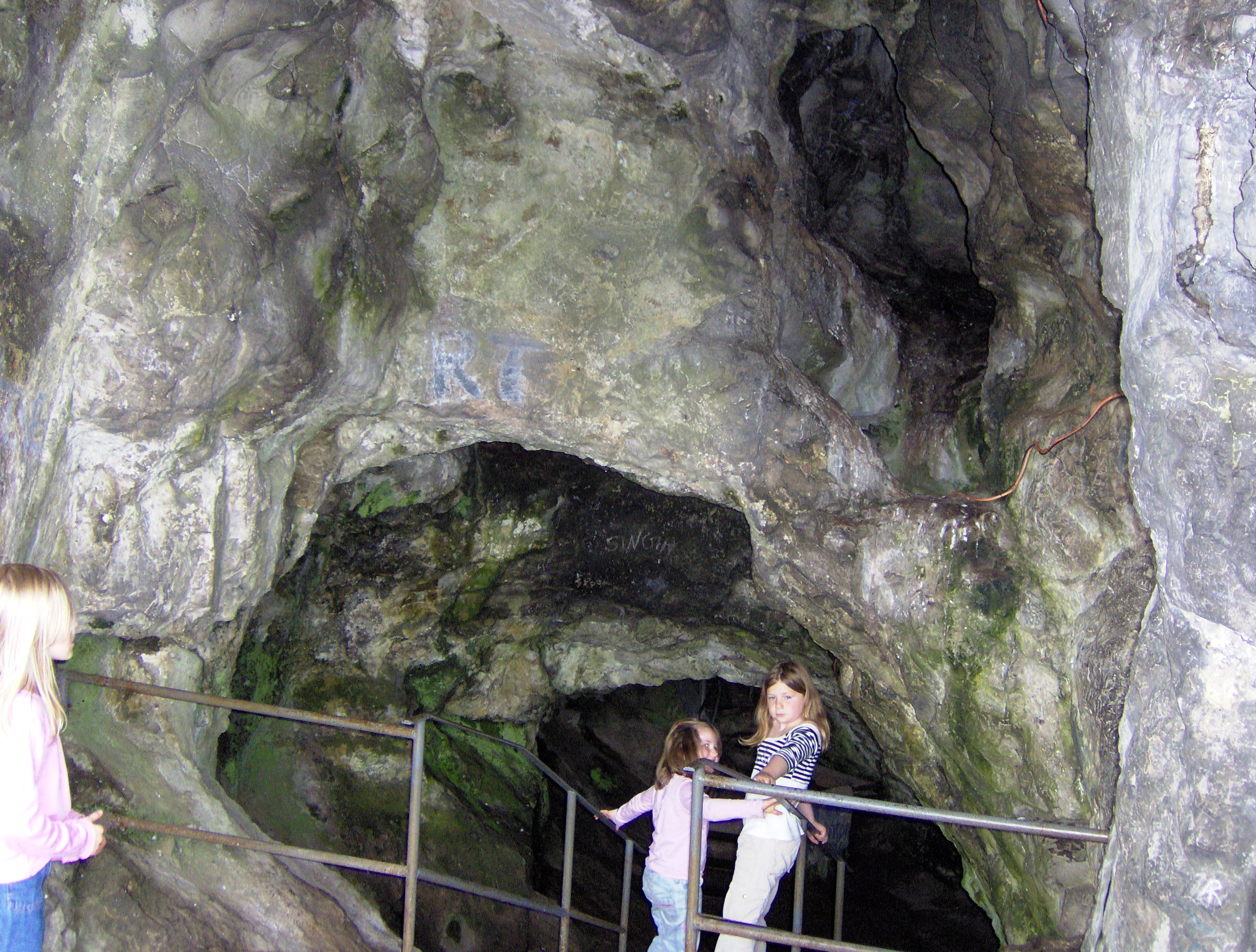
St Vincent's Cave

West also built a tunnel from the observatory to St Vincent's Cave (also known as Ghyston's Cave or Giants' Cave), which opens onto St Vincent's Rocks on the cliff face, 250 feet (76 m) above the floor of the Avon gorge and 90 feet (27 m) below the cliff top. The tunnel, which is 200 feet (61 m) long, took two years to build at a cost of £1,300, and first opened to the public in 1837.

This cave was first mentioned as being a chapel in the year AD 305 and excavations, in which Romano-British pottery has been found, have revealed that it has been both a holy place and a place of refuge at various times in its history. Although the cave is in limestone, there are few formations in the natural passages.

== See also ==
- Grade II* listed buildings in Bristol
- The Downs (Bristol)
