= Miscellaneous Works of Edward Gibbon =

First edition, volume I, 1796

The English historian Edward Gibbon (1737–1794) is known primarily as the author of the magisterial The History of the Decline and Fall of the Roman Empire (6 vols., 1776–1789).

== Description ==
Shortly following Gibbon's death, his good friend and literary executor, John Lord Sheffield undertook to edit and in 1796 published the first (of three) edition(s) of the Miscellaneous Works of Edward Gibbon (MW) in order that the reading public have an opportunity to gain a broader insight into the historian and his overall body of work. Various elements of the MW, as well as other Gibbon writings not contained therein, are listed below along with their pertinent bibliographical detail and descriptive text where available. Notes and letters from Sheffield were also included in the MW, but only Gibbon's writings follow here. Listed contents are exactly those from each volume's table as they appear in the Google Books digitized copies. Links to those copies are provided below. Where publisher and year follows a work the reference is to the year of its first publication apart from the MW. A year following alone (with or without a scholar's name) refers to the year of Gibbon's composition. An asterisk [*] denotes that the work can be found in Craddock, EEEG (see References).

== The Miscellaneous Works ==
- First edition: 2 vols. quarto (London: A. Strahan, T. Cadell, Jr. & W. Davies, March 31, 1796).
  - Volume I:
    - Memoirs of my Life and Writings. independently, and likely pirated as, Memoirs of the Life and Writings of Edward Gibbon, Esq., 2 vols. duodecimo (London: Hunt & Clarke, 1827).
      online: 1898 edition, O.F. Emerson, ed. incomplete portions of six "drafts" lettered A–F. Sheffield aggressively edited both the Memoirs and the MW in order to reflect Gibbon's anti-French Revolutionary sentiment while also downplaying his connection with Edmund Burke's eschatological interpretation; to prevent any further enlargement of Gibbon's reputation for harboring "irreligion" or atheism; and for other purposes of a more personal nature. In 1966, Georges Bonnard published a composite collection chronologically arranged, "built on the same general lines" as Sheffield's, along with a thoroughly informative account of the historical background. The drafts were not printed in their unedited entireties until 1896.
    - Letters from Gibbon to Sheffield et al.;
    - Letters to and from Edward Gibbon. Letter No. IX is Gibbon's "Lettre sur le gouvernement de Berne", see Second edition, Vol. II below.
  - Volume II:
    - Abstract of the Books Mr. Gibbon read – with Reflections,
    - Extracts from his Journal,
    - A Collection of his Remarks, and detached Pieces, on different Subjects,
    - Outlines of the History of the World (1771 Craddock; 1784 Ghosh)*;
    - Essai sur l'Étude de la Littérature (à Londres: T. Becket & P.A. De Hondt, 1761; Paris: Chez Duchesne, 1762); first English translation (London: T. Becket & P.A. De Hondt, 1764). Gibbon's first published work, an invaluable introduction to the Decline and Fall, defends the érudits (antiquarian scholars) against French philosophes (especially D'Alembert in his Discours préliminaire à l'Encyclopédie [1751]) who had "contemptuously" assailed the érudits' work as inferior, parochial, and effete. Gibbon recoiled at the charges, and strove to reconcile the two groups by "proving ... that all the faculties of the mind may be exercised and displayed by [the] study of ancient litterature [sic]". The Essai was reviewed with "cold indifference" in England, but on the continent, it was met enthusiastically. In Paris, Gibbon was recognized as a man of letters. Sheffield opted not to provide an English translation because the Becket & De Hondt (1764) already existed.
    - Critical Observations on the Design of the Sixth Book of [Virgil's] 'The Aenid' (London: P. Elmsley, 1770)*;
    - A Dissertation on the Subject of L'Homme au Masque de Fer (1774 in English)*;
    - Mémoir Justificatif Pour Servir de Réponse a l'Exposé, etc., de la Cour de France: First ed. (no place or printer, 1779); Second ed. (London: T. Harrison & S. Brooke, 1779);
    - A Vindication of the Fifteenth and Sixteenth Chapters of the History of the Decline and Fall of the Roman Empire (London: J. Dodsley, 1779)* online;
    - Antiquities of the House of Brunswick (London: J. Murray, 1814)* online;
    - An Address, &c. [recommending Mr. John Pinkerton [to publish] the 'Scriptores Rerum Anglicarum', our Latin Memorials of the Middle Ages] (1793)* as An Address &c. a well-conceived, persuasive plan to publish what Gibbon saw as a glaring deficiency in the English archives, i.e., the collected works of all English historians from 500 to 1500 A.D., including "the most ancient of our national writers" through the onset of David Hume's "true and perfect Æra of modern history". The deficiency grew all the more conspicuous when contrasted with similar projects already successfully carried out in Germany, Italy, France, and Denmark. The brief work strongly recommends Scot historian and poet John Pinkerton to head the project; an editor, Gibbon writes, "replete with a variety of knowledge", and "well qualified for this study, by a spirit of Criticism, acute discerning and suspicious". For his part, Gibbon was prepared to contribute a general introduction and author-specific prefaces.

The first edition was "pirated" and reprinted twice in 1796, in Ireland and Switzerland:

- 3 vols. octavo (Dublin: P. Wogan, L. White et al.), adds only a "long note in French on Mme de Sévery" in vol. 1 at pp. 277–278. vol. 1: online. includes Memoirs of my Life and Writings; Appendix (Letters to and from Gibbon). vol. 2: online. Letters to and from Edward Gibbon, Esq.; Abstract of the Books Mr. Gibbon read – with Reflections; Extracts from his Journal. vol. 3: online. Extracts from Mr. Gibbon's Journal; A Collection of his Remarks, and detached pieces, on different Subjects; Outlines of the History of the World; Essai sur l'Étude de la Littérature; Critical Observations on the Sixth Book of The Aenid; Dissertation sur l'Homme au Masque de Fer; Mémoir Justificatif; A Vindication; Antiquities of the House of Brunswick; An Address &c.
- 7 vols. octavo (Basel: J.J. Tourneisen). vols. 1–5 contain the London edition minus the French to English translations. vols. 6–7 incorporate the French to English translations, and a reprint of the 1764 English translation of the Essai sur l'Étude de la Littérature (not in the London edition).
- Second edition: 5 vols. octavo (London: J. Murray, 1814). proclaiming itself "a new edition with considerable additions", and grouped topically by Sheffield.
  - Volume I, Memoirs and Letters: online
    - Memoirs of my Life and Writings;
    - Letters to and from Edward Gibbon, Esq.;
    - Abstract of Mr. Gibbon's Will.
  - Volume II, Letters: online
    - Letters to and from Edward Gibbon, Esq.
    - Lettre sur le gouvernement de Berne (Norman: 1758–1759; Pocock: 1764) ["Letter No. IX. Mr. Gibbon to *** on the Government of Berne" also appears with English translation in first edition, vol. 1, pp. 388–413]. a fictional letter from a Swedish diarist to a Swiss friend comparing the governments of Bern and early Rome. Employing language undeniably influenced by Montesquieu, Gibbon observes that Bern in adopting an oligarchic form similar to the Venetian, has omitted any incorporation of the separation of powers, in doing so has ignored the "principles of liberty", and therefore stands on the brink of despotism. Pocock identifies the Lettre as Gibbon's "first essay on empire in the context of European history". By this time, Gibbon has clearly adopted erudition as "the dominant interest of his young and his mature life". Sheffield's preface intones: "The excellence of this curious paper will apologize for its great length." (31 octavo pages including translation).
  - Volume III, Historical and Critical: online
    - Outlines of the History of the World;
    - Mémoire sur la Monarchie de Mèdes (1768);
    - Les Principales Epoques de l'Histoire de la Grèce et de l'Egypte, suivant Sir Isaac Newton (1758);
    - Extrait de trois Mémoires de M. L'Abbé de la Bleterie sur la Succession de l'Empire Romain (1758);
    - Remarques Critiques sur le Nombre des Habitans dans la Cité des Sybarites;
    - Gouvernement Féodal, surtout en France (1768);
    - Relation des Noces de Charles Duc de Bourgogne (1768);
    - Critical Researches concerning the Title of Charles the Eighth to the Crown of Naples (1761);
    - An Account of a Letter addressed to Cocchi by chevalier L.G. Aretino (1764);
    - An Examination of [Paul Henri] Mallet's Introduction to the History of Denmark (1764);
    - Introduction à l'Histoire générale de la République des Suisses (1765–1767); in Gibbon's own estimation, "a slight and superficial essay" not finished because of his uneasy comprehension of the gap between medieval Swiss and general European historiography.
    - Remarques touchant les Doutes Historiques sur la Vie et le Règne du Roi Richard III. Par M. Horace Walpole. (1768);
    - Antiquities of the House of Brunswick (1790–1791 Craddock);
    - An Address recommending Mr. John Pinkerton [to publish] the "Scriptores Rerum Anglicarum", our Latin Memorials of the Middle Ages (1793)* as An Address &c, see same title above under First edition, Volume II.
    - Appendix to an Address explanatory, &c. by Mr. Pinkerton.
  - Volume IV, Classical and Critical: online
    - Essai sur l'Étude de la Littérature;
    - On the Character of Brutus (1765–1766 Craddock; 1769 Ghosh)* as Digression on the Character of Brutus;
    - On Mr. [Richard] Hurd's Commentary on Horace (1762)* as Hurd on Horace;
    - Nomina Gentesque Antiquae Italiae [aka Recueil sur la Géographie ancienne de l'Italie] (1763–1764);
    - An Inquiry whether a Catalogue of the Armies sent into the Field is an essential part of an Epic Poem (1763);
    - An Examination of the Catalogue of Silius Italicus (1763);
    - A Minute Examination of Horace's Journey to Brundusium and of Cicero's Journey into Cilicia (1763);
    - On the Fasti of Ovid (1764);
    - On the Triumphs of the Romans (1764);
    - On the Triumphal Shows and Ceremonies (1764);
    - Remarques sur les Ouvrages et sur le Caractère de Salluste;
    - ——————— de Jules César;
    - ——————— de Cornelius Nepos;
    - ——————— de Tite Live (1756);
    - Remarques Critiques sur un Passage de Plaute (1757);
    - Remarques sur quelques Endroits de Virgile (1757);
    - Critical Observations on [the Design of] the Sixth Book of the Aeneid (1770);
    - Postscript to Ditto;
    - A Vindication of some Passages in the Fifteenth and Sixteenth Chapters of the History of the Decline and Fall of the Roman Empire (1779).
  - Volume V, Miscellaneous: online
    - Mémoir Justificatif Pour Servir de Réponse a l'Exposé, etc., de la Cour de France (1779);
    - Dissertation on the Allegorical Beings found on the reverses of Medals (1764);
    - Account of a MS. by the Abbé G.V. Gravina, del Governo Civile di Roma (1764);
    - Dissertation on the subject of l'Homme au Masque de Fer (1774);
    - Observations sur les Mémoires Posthumes de M. de Chéseaux (1756);
    - Remarques sur quelques Prodiges (1757);
    - Remarques Critiques sur les Dignités Sacerdotales de Jules César (1757);
    - Principes des Poids, des Monnoies, et des Mesures des Anciens (1759);
    - Dissertation sur les Anciennes Mesures &c. (1759 Sheffield; 1768 Ghosh);
    - On the Position of the Meridional Line, and the supposed Circumnavigation of Africa by the Ancients (1790 or 1791 Sheffield; 1789–1790 Craddock)* as The Circumnavigation of Africa;
    - Selections from Mr. Gibbon's Extraits Raisonnés de mes Lectures, from the Journal, from the Receuil de mes Observations, et Pièces Détachées, Common-Place Books*, and Memoranda;
    - Remarks on Blackstone's Commentaries (1770)* as Abstract of 'Commentaries'..by Blackstone;
    - Index Expurgatorius (1768–69)*;
    - Observations on Augerii Gislenii Busbequii Omnia quae extent;
    - Notes and Additions to [Edward] Harewood's View of the various Editions of the Greek and Roman Classics (1793)* as Annotations in Har[]wood;
    - Appendix to the Treatise on the Position of the Meridional Line and the supposed Circumnavigation of Africa by the Ancients.
- Third edition, 1 vol. quarto (London: J. Murray, April 4, 1815). contains all the new material from the second London edition printed in the first edition's quarto format in order to create a complete three-volume quarto set.

== Other writings ==
- General Observations on the Fall of the Roman Empire in the West (1772) online. first published at the end of volume III (1781) of the Decline and Fall
- Notes on Modern Europe (1777)*
- Codice Diplomatico (1790)*
- Materials for a Seventh Volume (1790–1791)*
- Notes on the Antiquity of the English Universities (1789–1791)*
- Marginalia in Herodotus (1789)*
- Habsburgica (1792–1793)*

== See also ==
- Edward Gibbon page
- The Work of J.G.A. Pocock: Edward Gibbon section
- The History of the Decline and Fall of the Roman Empire
- Outline of The History of the Decline and Fall of the Roman Empire, including A Gibbon Chronology
