= The Goths in Italy =

Painting by Paul Falconer Poole

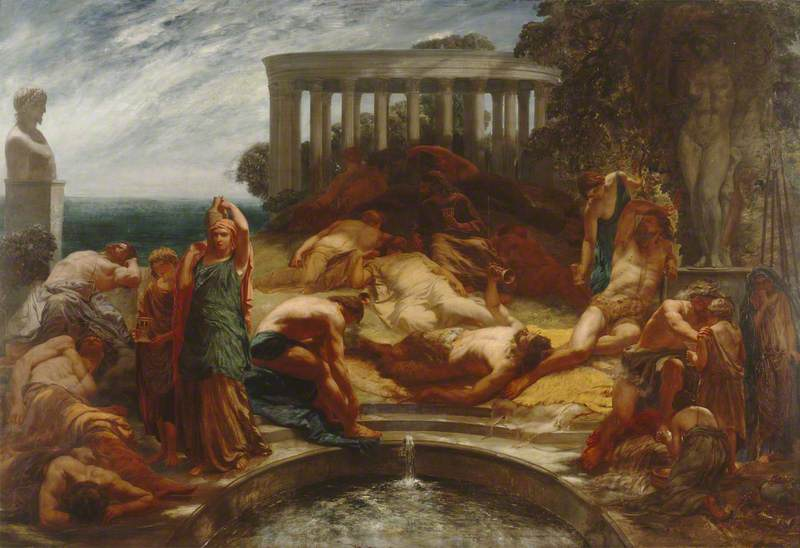
- Artist: Paul Falconer Poole
- Year: c.1851
- Type: Oil on canvas, history painting
- Dimensions: 142 cm × 209.5 cm (56 in × 82.5 in)
- Location: Manchester Art Gallery, Greater Manchester

The Goths in Italy is an 1851 history painting by the British artist Paul Falconer Poole. It depicts the fall of Ancient Rome to the Gothic invaders in 410. The barbarian Goths are shown drunkenly lolling about outside amid classical buildings, drinking wine brought to their by their Romain prisoners. It dwells on the decadence and collapse of the Roman Empire.

Poole drew inspiration from Edward Gibbon's Decline and Fall of the Roman Empire. The picture was displayed at the Royal Academy Exhibition of 1851 held at the National Gallery in London, although the artist may have retouched it over the following two years. Today it is the collection of Manchester Art Gallery, having been acquired in

== Bibliography ==
- Vance, Norman. The Victorians and Ancient Rome. Wiley, 1998.
