= Patricia Craddock =

Patricia B. Craddock is an American author and professor of English, writer of works on the historian Edward Gibbon, the author of The History of the Decline and Fall of the Roman Empire, including a two-volume biography, Young Edward Gibbon: Gentleman of Letters (Johns Hopkins, 1982) and Edward Gibbon: "Luminous" Historian (Johns Hopkins, 1989).

Craddock was formerly chair of the Department of English at Boston University. She came to the University of Florida as Professor and Chair of English Department in 1988 and served as chair of the department until 1994. She was also named a Distinguished Professor. Craddock has also taught at the University of Montevallo, Connecticut College, and Goucher College, and has been a visiting professor at the Massachusetts Institute of Technology. She is the 1997–98 Catherine and Herbert Yardley Professor at the University of Florida. She is a Guggenheim Fellow and the recipient of two National Endowment for the Humanities senior fellowships, an American Council of Learned Societies grant-in-aid, and a fellowship at the Institute for Advanced Study in Princeton, New Jersey.

Craddock was published two of the annual volumes of the journal Studies in Eighteenth-Century Culture as editor. She also served on the editorial boards of South Atlantic Review (1996–98), The Age of Johnson: A Scholarly Annual (1992–present), and the Georgia Smollett edition (1997–present) and is English Book Review editor of The Eighteenth Century: A Current Bibliography.
