= Memoirs of My Life and Writings =

1796 book about Edward Gibbon

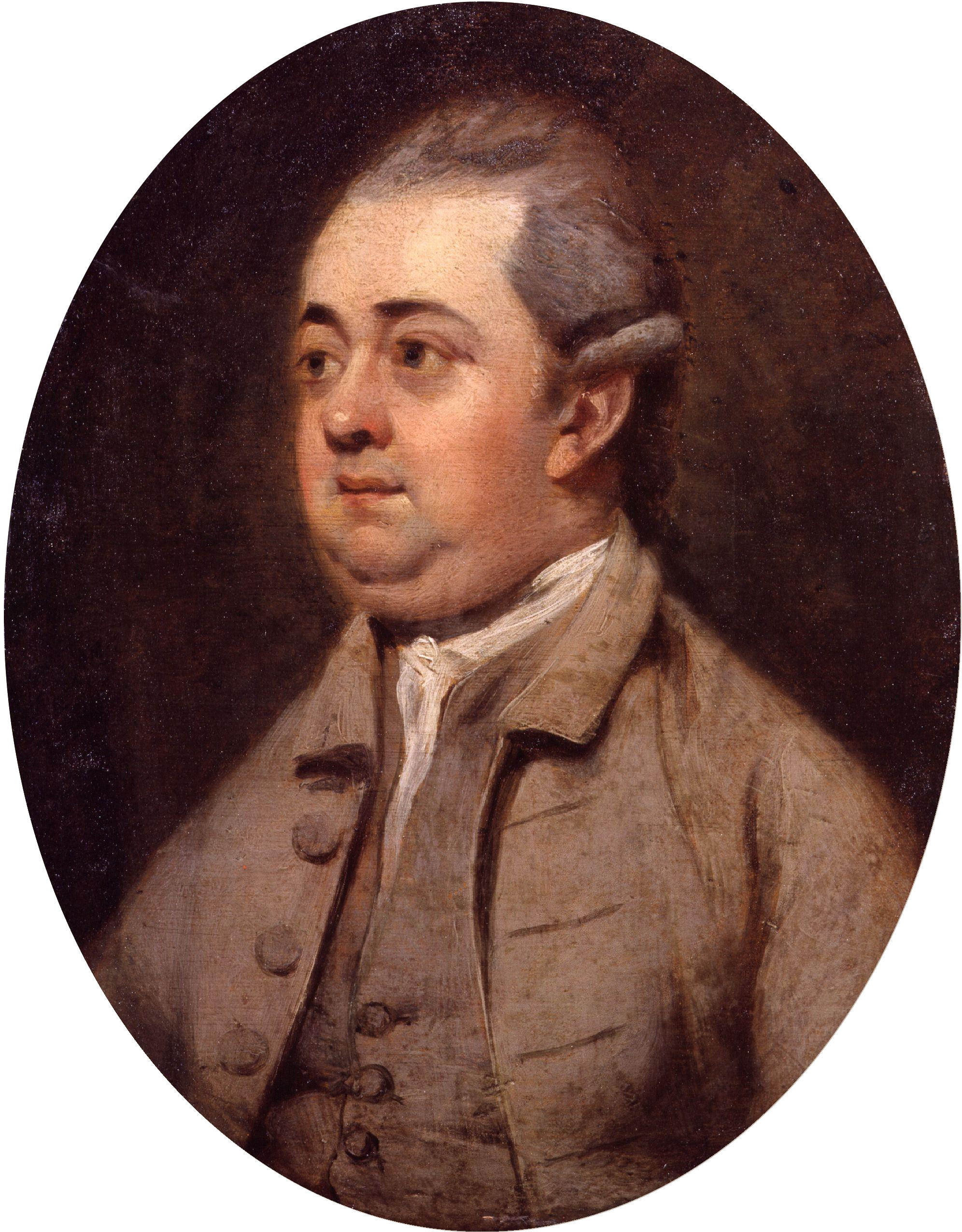
Edward Gibbon, by Henry Walton, 1773

Memoirs of My Life and Writings (1796) is an account of the historian Edward Gibbon's life, compiled after his death by his friend Lord Sheffield from six fragmentary autobiographical works Gibbon wrote during his last years. Lord Sheffield's editing has been praised for its ingenuity and taste, but blamed for its unscholarly aggressiveness. Since 1896 several other editions of the work have appeared, more in accordance with modern standards. Gibbon's Memoirs are considered one of the first autobiographies in the modern sense of the word, and have a secure place in the canon of English literature.

== Synopsis ==
Gibbon begins with an account of his ancestors before moving on to his birth and education, which was partly private and partly at Westminster School. He matriculated as a student at Oxford University, an institution which he found at a low ebb.

To the university of Oxford I acknowledge no obligation; and she will as cheerfully renounce me for a son, as I am willing to disclaim her for a mother. I spent fourteen months at Magdalen College; they proved the fourteen months the most idle and unprofitable of my whole life.

Of one of his tutors Gibbon says that he "well remembered that he had a salary to receive, and only forgot that he had a duty to perform." Gibbon's father took alarm on learning that he had converted to Roman Catholicism and, in order to bring him back to the Protestant fold, sent him to live with a Calvinist minister in Lausanne. Gibbon made good use of his time in Switzerland, meeting Voltaire and other literary figures, and perfecting his command of the French language. He also fell in love with a Swiss girl, Suzanne Curchod, but his wish to marry her was implacably opposed by his father. "I sighed as a lover, I obeyed as a son." On returning to England he published his first work, the Essai sur l'étude de la littérature (Essay on the study of literature). The next major event Gibbon mentions was his taking a commission in the Hampshire militia, an experience which he tells us was later to be of advantage to him:

The discipline and evolutions of a modern battalion gave me a clearer notion of the phalanx and the legion; and the captain of the Hampshire grenadiers (the reader may smile) has not been useless to the historian of the Roman empire.

He then details his travels through France and on to Lausanne, where he formed a friendship with John Holroyd, later Lord Sheffield, which was to last for the rest of his life. Gibbon crossed the Alps into Italy and eventually reached Rome. He had for some time wanted to begin writing a history, without being able to choose a subject, but now, he tells us, the exciting experience of walking in the footsteps of the heroes of antiquity gave him a new idea:

It was at Rome, on the 15th of October, 1764, as I sat musing amidst the ruins of the Capitol, while the bare-footed friars were singing vespers in the temple of Jupiter, that the idea of writing the decline and fall of the city first started to my mind.

After returning to England Gibbon engaged in several other literary exercises before finally beginning to write his Roman history. The Memoirs now give a detailed account of the years he spent producing its successive volumes, and of the many hostile criticisms his work attracted. These labours were diversified by his experiences as a Member of Parliament, and his writing, at the request of the Government, a "Mémoire justificatif" asserting the justice of British hostilities against France at the time of the American Revolutionary War. During the course of writing the Decline and Fall Gibbon moved back to Lausanne. Gibbon's Memoirs end with a survey of the factors he considered had combined to bring him a happy and productive life.

== Composition and manuscripts ==
Gibbon wrote a short account of his life in French in 1783. For five years he made no attempt to add to this, but in June 1788, one month after the last volumes of The Decline and Fall of the Roman Empire were published, he began work on the Memoirs by writing to the College of Arms for information about his ancestry. For the remaining years of his life he struggled with the task of recording his life in a satisfactory way, and his death in 1794 came before he could resolve the problem. Six attempts at an autobiography have survived, conventionally identified by the letters A to F:

A: The Memoirs of the life of Edward Gibbon with various observations and excursions by himself (1788–1789). 40 quarto pages (6 missing).
B: My own Life (1788–1789). 72 quarto pages. Describes the first 27 years of his life.
C: Memoirs of the life and writings of Edward Gibbon (1789). 41 folio pages plus insert. Describes the first 35 years of his life.
D: [Untitled] (1790–1791). 13 folio pages. Describing the first 35 years of his life.
E: My own Life (c. 1792–1793). 19 folio pages of text, and twelve of notes. Describing the first 54 years of his life.
F: [Untitled] (1792–1793). 41 folio pages of text, and 7 of notes. Describing the first 16 years of his life.

As the drafts of the work succeeded each other Gibbon in some passages varied the emphasis, and even changed the facts, but where he was satisfied with the words of the previous version he simply transcribed them. E is the only version to cover his whole life, and perhaps the only one he wrote with a view to publication during his own lifetime, but it omits many things included in the other versions. As he wrote to Lord Sheffield,

A man may state many things in a posthumous work, that he might not in another; the latter often checks the introduction of many curious thoughts and facts.

Gibbon's struggles with his autobiography were ended by his death in 1794. All six manuscripts then fell into the hands of his literary executor, Lord Sheffield, who used them to produce his own composite edition. They remained undisturbed in the possession of his family, until in 1871 his son George Holroyd, 2nd Earl of Sheffield, lent them to the medical writer William Alexander Greenhill, who established their chronological order of composition and gave them the letters by which they are now always identified. In 1895 the manuscripts were sold by the 3rd earl to the British Museum, where they were bound together. They remain in the British Library as Add. MS. 34874.

== Editing and publication ==
Attempting to bring the manuscripts into a publishable state, Lord Sheffield found himself in a quandary. Of all the versions available to him, only E could be called a complete narrative of Gibbon's life up to the 1790s, yet this one was very short on detail, and by no means a substantial work. The other manuscripts were more circumstantial, but all left the story unfinished. His solution was to produce a composite version, taking passages or individual sentences from each, especially from F, and shaping them into an artistically satisfying whole. Choosing the title Memoirs of My Life and Writings, he made the resulting work the centerpiece of a collection of inedited Gibboniana published in 1796 in two quarto volumes as Miscellaneous Works of Edward Gibbon Esquire. The work was reprinted many times through the 19th century, and remained the only published form of Gibbon's autobiography until 1896, when the publisher John Murray produced an edition giving the full text of all six manuscripts. Two years later the American scholar Oliver Farrar Emerson edited the manuscripts along similar lines. In 1966 Georges Bonnard returned to Lord Sheffield’s plan of producing an eclectic edition, though with far greater scholarly conscientiousness. The last major new edition of Gibbon's Memoirs was the work of Betty Radice, and appeared in the Penguin English Library series in 1984.

== Reception ==
So high is the critical repute of Gibbon's Memoirs that The Cambridge History of English Literature declared it had "by general consent…established itself as one of the most fascinating books of its class in English literature". One reason for this is the candour and openness with which Gibbon speaks of himself. "Few men, I believe," Lord Sheffield wrote, "have ever so fully unveiled their own character". Again, Gibbon broke new ground in making it a truly "philosophical", that is to say analytical, autobiography; as the novelist Anthony Burgess wrote, "the sense of intellectual control, of a life somehow grasped as a concept, is unmatched". It is widely held that Gibbon's Memoirs, along with the Confessions of Jean-Jacques Rousseau, brought the modern autobiography into being.

In recent years much has been written by critics on Gibbon's failure to reach a final recension of his autobiography. It has been explained in various ways: as a sign of Gibbon's wrestling with difficulties of literary form; as a result of disagreements between Gibbon and Sheffield as to how far the Memoirs should follow Edmund Burke's interpretation of the French Revolution; or in psychoanalytic terms as the reflection of an uncertainty in Gibbon's mind as to his own identity.

When, with the publication of Murray's edition, it became possible to judge Sheffield's role in conflating the different versions of the Memoirs, some critics accorded him praise moderated by their shock at finding how large a part he had played. The historian Frederic Harrison's opinion was that he had performed his task with "great skill and tact, but with the most daring freedom"; and an anonymous writer in the Spectator said of Sheffield that

with an ingenuity which, in spite of its perversity, cannot but be admired, he concocted out of the six [manuscripts] a patchwork narrative, which has since always passed as Gibbon's autobiography. In reality it was nothing of the kind, and should have been called not Gibbon's Autobiography but Selections from the Autobiographical Remains of Edward Gibbon.

20th and 21st centuries critical opinions of Sheffield's work as an editor have diverged widely. In 1913 the Cambridge History of English Literature called it "extraordinarily skillful", and in the 1960s Anthony Burgess wrote of "Six holograph sketches, out of which Lord Sheffield stitched not a patchwork but a tasteful and well-fitting suit of clothes." The academic W. B. Carnochan called Sheffield's editing "brilliant though high-handed", and pointed out that

Were it not for his unremitting labors, we would not think of Gibbon as having written a great autobiography; rather, we would think of him as a historian who tried to write an autobiography but failed.

The academic David Womersley has written in the Oxford Dictionary of National Biography that Sheffield did the job "With equal judgement, freedom, and shrewdness", but elsewhere he has conceded that "From our standpoint…Sheffield's handling of Gibbon’s manuscript was scandalous.". This last judgement has been endorsed by the historian Glen Bowersock, while the Gibbon scholar Jane Elizabeth Norton said that "By all the standards of scholarship, Lord Sheffield's conduct was deplorable."

== Modern editions ==
- Murray, John, ed. The Autobiographies of Edward Gibbon. London: John Murray, 1896.
  - 2nd edition: London: John Murray, 1897.
  - Reprint: Charleston, SC: BiblioLife, 2009. ISBN 1115614126
  - Reprint: Charleston, SC: Nabu Press, 2010. ISBN 1171854544
- Bonnard, Georges A., ed. Memoirs of My Life. London: Nelson, 1966.
  - American edition: New York, Funk & Wagnalls, 1969.
- Radice, Betty, ed. Memoirs of My Life. Harmondsworth: Penguin, 1984.
  - Reprint: London: Penguin, 1990. ISBN 0140432175
  - Reprint: London: Folio Society, 1991.
