= Outline of The History of the Decline and Fall of the Roman Empire =

Work by Edward Gibbon

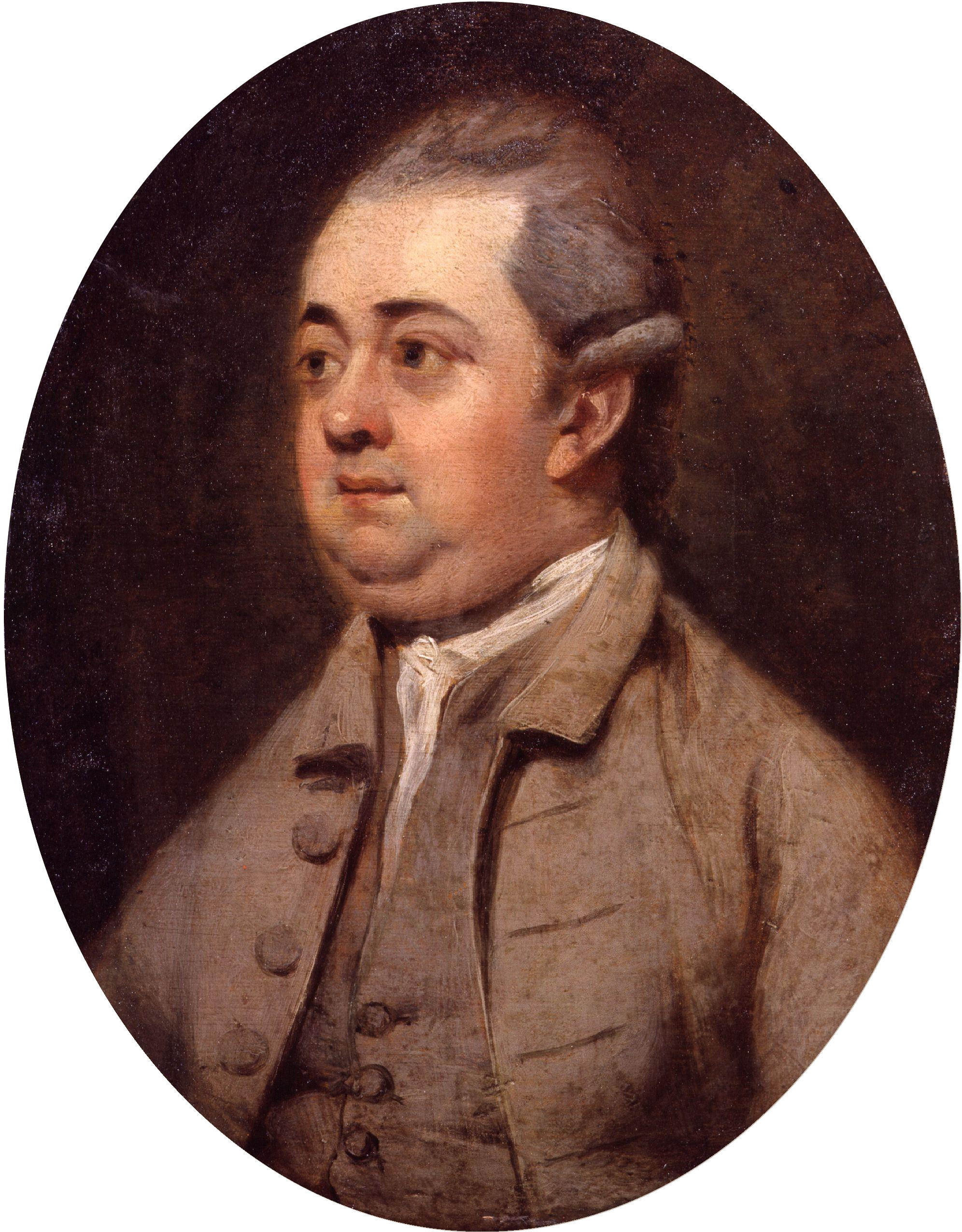
Edward Gibbon (1737–1794)

The six-volume work The History of the Decline and Fall of the Roman Empire by the English historian Edward Gibbon (1737–1794) has been reprinted many times over the years in various editions.

== Editions ==
The original edition was published between 1776 and 1789 in six volumes by the firm of [William] Strahan & [Thomas] Cadell, in the Strand, London.

- Volume I has a complex history of its own. It was published in six editions between 1776 and 1789. Three of the six contain authorial revisions, marked AR:
  - First editions, 1776 Feb 17 (a and b-AR), 1000 copies;
  - Second edition, 1776 June 3; 1500 copies;
  - Third edition, 1777 May (AR); 1000 copies;
  - Fourth edition, 1781 Apr 4 (AR);
  - Fifth editions, 1782 Apr 11 (a and b);
  - Sixth edition, 1789 Dec 1.
- Volumes II, III were published together in three editions between 1781 and 1789:
  - First editions, 1781 Mar 1 (a and b; b sometimes called the second edition);
  - Second edition, 1787 (n/a);
  - Third edition, 1789 Dec 1. published with the sixth edition of volume one as a new set.
- Volumes IV, V, VI were published together in one edition only: 1788 May 8; 3000 copies each.

A one-volume edition with an "introductory memoir of the author" by William Youngman was published by J.O. Robinson (London, 1830). The 1838–1839 Rev. H.H. (Dean) Milman edition, the first English critical edition, was published in 12 volumes. A second Milman edition, which serves as the basis for most electronic and public domain versions such as the Gutenberg one, was published in 1846 in 6 volumes. The original J.B. Bury edition (1896–1900) was 7 volumes. The revised J.B. Bury edition was published in 1909–14 and it was later reprinted by the AMS Press in 1974–8.

The 1910 Everyman's Library edition in 6 volumes was prepared by Oliphant Smeaton. This was reprinted in the US with Smeaton's notes in two volumes by Modern Library in 1932, later divided into three volumes, and the text without his notes was reprinted as volumes 40 and 41 of the Great Books of the Western World series in 1952. The 1946 Heritage Press edition of Bury's is three volumes. It divides the chapters into Volume 1: 1–26, Volume 2: 27–48, Volume 3: 49–71.

The latest complete edition in 3 volumes was edited by David Womersley, and published by Allen Lane (London) and Penguin Press (New York) in 1994.

== Contents ==
1. The Extent and Military Force of the Empire in the Age of the Antonines which was in the Years 98–180
2. Of the Union and Internal Prosperity of the Roman Empire, in the Age of the Antonines – Art – Character
3. Of the Constitution of the Roman Empire, in the Age of the Antonines – Rulers from Augustus to Domitian
4. The Cruelty, Follies, and Murder of Commodus – Election of Pertinax – His Attempts to Reform the State – His Assassination by the Praetorian Guards – Indignation
5. Public Sale of the Empire to Didius Julianus by the Praetorian Guards – Clodius Albinus in Britain, Pescennius Niger in Syria, and Septimius Severus in Pannonia, declare against the Murderers of Pertinax – Civil Wars and Victory of Severus Over his Three Rivals – Relaxation of Discipline – New Maxims of Government
6. The Death of Severus – Tyranny of Caracalla – Usurpation of Macrinus – Follies of Elagabalus – Virtues of Alexander Severus – Licentiousness of the Army – General State of the Roman Finances – Tax & Tribute
7. The Elevation, and Tyranny, of Maximinus – Rebellion in Africa and Italy, under the Authority of the Senate – Civil Wars and Seditions – Violent Deaths of Maximin and his Son, of Maximus and Balbinus, and of the three Gordians – Usurpation and secular Games of Philip
8. Of the State of Persia after the Restoration of the Monarchy by Artaxerxes – His Character and Maxims
9. The State of Germany till the Invasion of the Barbarians, in the time of the Emperor Decius – 248 AD.
10. The Emperors Decius, Gallus, Aemilianus, Valerian, and Gallienus – The general Irruption of the Barbarians – The Thirty Tyrants – Their Real Number Nineteen
11. Reign of Claudius – Defeat of the Goths – Victories, Triumph, and Death, of Aurelian – Zenobia's Character
12. Conduct of the Army and Senate after the Death of Aurelian – Reigns of Tacitus, Probus, Carus and his Sons
13. The Reign of Diocletian and his Three Associates, Maximian, Galerius, and Constantius – General Re-establishment of Order and Tranquility – The Persian War, Victory, and Triumph – The new Form of Administration – The Abdication and Retirement of Diocletian and Maximian
14. Troubles after the Abdication of Diocletian – Death of Constantius – Elevation of Constantine and Maxentius – Six Emperors at the same Time – Death of Maximian and Galerius – Victories of Constantine over Maxentius and Licinius – Reunion of the Empire under the Authority of Constantine – His Laws – General Peace
15. The Progress of the Christian Religion, and the Sentiments, Manners, Numbers, and Condition of the Primitive Christians – Ceremonies, Arts, and Festivals
16. The Conduct of the Roman Government towards the Christians, from Reign of Nero to that of Constantine – Persecution of Jews & Christians by Domitian
17. Foundation of Constantinople – Political System of Constantine, and his Successors – Military Discipline – The Palace – Finances – General Tribute – Free Gifts
18. Character of Constantine – Gothic War – Death of Constantine – Division of the Empire among his three sons – Persian War – Tragic Deaths of Constantine the Younger and Constans – Usurpation of Magnentius – Civil War – Victory of Constantius II
19. Constantius sole Emperor – Elevation and Death of Gallus – Danger and Elevation of Julian – Sarmatian and Persian Wars – Victories of Julian in Gaul – Paris
20. The Motives, Progress, and Effects of the Conversion of Constantine – Legal Establishment and Constitution of the Christian or Catholic Church – The Clergy
21. Persecution of Heresy – The Schism of the Donatists – The Arian Controversy – Athanasius – Distracted State of the Church and Empire under Constantine and his Sons
22. Julian is declared Emperor by the Legions of Gaul – His March and Success – The Death of Constantius – Civil Administration of Julian – His Fine Character
23. The Religion of Julian – Universal Toleration – He Attempts to Restore and Reform the Pagan Worship; To Rebuild the Temple of Jerusalem – His Artful Persecution of the Christians – Mutual Zeal and Injustice
24. Residence of Julian at Antioch – His Successful Expedition Against the Persians – Passage of the Tigris – The Retreat and Death of Julian – Election of Jovian – He Saves the Roman army by a Disgraceful Peace Treaty
25. The Government and Death of Jovian – Election of Valentinian I, who Associates his Brother Valens, and Makes the Final Division of the Eastern and Western Empires – Revolt of Procopius – Civil and Ecclesiastical Administration – Germany – Britain – Africa – the East – the Danube – Death of Valentinian – His Two Sons, Gratian and Valentinian II, Succeeded to the Western Empire – The Eastern Emperor is Without Influence
26. Manners of the Pastoral Nations – Progress of the Huns – Flight of the Goths – They Pass the Danube – Gothic War – Defeat and Death of Valens – Gratian Invests Theodosius I with the Eastern Empire – His Character and Success – Peace and Settlement of the Goths
27. Death of Gratian – Ruin of Arianism – St. Ambrose – First Civil War, against Maximus – Character, Administration, and Penance of Theodosius – Death of Valentinian II. – Second Civil War, against Eugenius – Death of Theodosius – Corruption of Times – Infantry Disarm
28. Final Destruction of Paganism – Introduction of the Worship of Saints and Relics among the Christians
29. Final Division of the Roman Empire between the Sons of Theodosius – Reign of Arcadius and Honorius – Administration of Rufinus and Stilicho – Revolt and Defeat of Gildo in Africa – Condemnation by the Senate
30. Revolt of the Goths – They Plunder Greece – Two Great Invasions of Italy by Alaric and Radagaisus – They are Repulsed by Stilicho – The Germans Overrun Gaul – Usurpation of Constantine in the West – Disgrace and Death of Stilicho – His Memory Persecuted – Claudian
31. Invasion of Italy by Alaric – Manners of the Roman Senate and People – Rome is Thrice Besieged and at Length Pillaged by the Goths – Death of Alaric – The Goths Evacuate Italy – Fall of Constantine – Gaul and Spain Occupied by the Barbarians – Freedom of Britain
32. Arcadius Emperor of the East – Administration and Disgrace of Eutropius – Revolt of Gainas – persecution of St. John Chrysostom – Theodosius II Emperor of the East – His Sister Pulcheria – His Wife Eudocia – The Persian War, and Division of Armenia – Lustre on Decline
33. Death of Honorius – Valentinian III. Emperor of the West – Administration of his Mother Placidia – Aëtius and Boniface – Conquest of Africa by the Vandals
34. The Character, Conquests, and Court of Attila, King of the Huns – Death of Theodosius the Younger – Elevation of Marcian by Pulcheria to the Empire of the East
35. Invasion of Gaul by Attila – He is repulsed by Aetius and the Visigoths – Attila Invades and Evacuates Italy – The Deaths of Attila, Aetius, and Valentinian III – Symptoms of the Ruin of the Roman Government
36. Sack of Rome by Genseric, King of the Vandals – His Naval Depredations – Succession of the Last Emperors of the West, Maximus, Avitus, Majorian, Severus, Anthemius, Olybrius, Glycerius, Nepos, Augustulus – Total Extinction of the Western Empire – Reign and Character of Odoacer, the first Barbarian King of Italy
37. Origin, Progress, and Effects of the Monastic Life – Conversion of the Barbarians to Christianity and Arianism – Persecution of the Vandals in Africa – Extinction of Arianism among Barbarians – Jews in Spain
38. Reign and Conversion of Clovis – His Victories over the Alemanni, Burgundians, and Visigoths – Establishment of the French Monarchy in Gaul – Laws of the Barbarians – State of the Romans – The Visigoths of Spain – Conquest of Britain by the Saxons – King Arthur
39. Zeno and Anastasius, Emperors of the East – Birth, Education, and First Exploits of Theodoric the Ostrogoth – His Invasion and Conquest of Italy – The Gothic Kingdom of Italy – State of the West – Military and Civil Government – The Senator Boethius – Death of Symmachus – The Last Acts and Death of Theodoric
40. Elevation of Justin the Elder – Reign of Justinian: I. The Empress Theodora – II. Factions of the Circus, and Sedition of Constantinople – III. Trade and Manufacture of Silk – IV. Finances and Taxes – V. Edifices of Justinian – Church of St. Sophia – Fortification and Frontiers of Eastern Empire – Abolition of Schools of Athens and the Roman Consulship by Justinian
41. Conquests of Justinian in the West – Character and First Campaigns of Belisarius – He Invades and Subdues the Vandal Kingdom of Africa – His Triumph – The Gothic War – He Recovers Sicily, Naples, and Rome – Siege of Rome by the Goths – Their Retreat and Losses – Surrender of Ravenna – Glory of Belisarius – His Domestic Shame and Misfortunes – His Wife Antonina
42. State of the Barbaric World – Establishment of the Lombards on the Danube – Tribes and Inroads of the Sclavonians – Origin, Empire, and Embassies of the Turks – The Flight of the Avars – Chosroes I. or Nushirvan King of Persia – His Reign and Wars with the Romans – The Colchian or Lazic War – The Aethiopians
43. Rebellions of Africa – Restoration of the Gothic Kingdom by Totila – Loss and Recovery of Rome – Final Conquest of Italy by Narses – Extinction of the Ostrogoths – Defeat of the Franks and Alemanni – Last Victory, Disgrace, and Death of Belisarius – Death and Character of Justinian – Comet, Earthquakes, Plague
44. Idea of the Roman Jurisprudence – The Laws of the Kings – The Twelve Tablets of the Decemvirs – The Laws of the People – The Decrees of the Senate – The Edicts of the Magistrates and Emperors – Authority of the Civilians – Code, Pandects, Novels, and Institutes of Justinian: – I. Rights of Persons – II. Rights of Things – III. Private Injury & Action – IV. Crime & Punishment
45. Reign of the Younger Justin – Embassy of the Avars – Their Settlement on the Danube – Conquest of Italy by the Lombards – Adoption and Reign of Tiberius – Of Maurice – State of Italy Under the Lombards and the Exarchs of Ravenna – Distress of Rome – Character and Pontificate of Gregory the First – The Saviour of Rome
46. Revolutions of Persia After the Death of Chosroes or Nushirvan – His Son Hormouz, a Tyrant, is Deposed – Usurpation of Bahram – Flight and Restoration of Chosroes II. – His Gratitude to the Romans – The Chagan of the Avars – Revolt of the Army Against Maurice – His Death – Tyranny of Phocas – Elevation of Heraclius – The Persian War – Chosroes Subdues Syria, Egypt, and Asia Minor – Siege of Constantinople by the Persians and Avars – Victories and Triumph of Heraclius
47. Theological History of the Doctrine of the Incarnation – The Human and Divine Nature of Christ – Enmity of the Patriarchs of Alexandria and Constantinople – St. Cyril and Nestorius – Third General Council of Ephesus – Heresy of Eutyches – Fourth General Council of Chalcedon – Civil and Ecclesiastical Discord – Intolerance of Justinian – The Three Chapters – The Monothelite Controversy – State of the Oriental Sects – I. The Nestorians – II. The Jacobites – III. The Maronites – IV. The Armenians – V. The Copts
48. Characters of the Greek Emperors of Constantinople, From the Time of Heraclius to the Latin Conquest
49. Introduction, Worship, and Persecution of Images – Revolt of Italy and Rome – Temporal Dominion of the Popes – Conquest of Italy by the Franks – Character and Coronation of Charlemagne – Decay of the Empire in the West – Independence of Italy – Constitution of the Germanic Body – The German Emperor Charles IV
50. Description of Arabia and its Inhabitants – Birth, Character, and Doctrine of Mahomet – He Preaches at Mecca – Flies to Medina – Propagates His Religion by the Sword – Voluntary or Reluctant Submission of the Arabs – His Death and Successors – The Claims and Fortunes of Ali His Descendants – Success of Mahomet
51. The Conquest of Persia, Syria, Egypt, Africa, and Spain, by the Arabs or Saracens – Empire of the Caliphs, or Successors of Mahomet – State of the Christians, &c. Under Their Government – Decline of Christianity
52. The Two Sieges of Constantinople by the Arabs – Their Invasion of France, and Defeat by Charles Martel – Civil Wars of the Ommiades and Abbassides – Learning of the Arabs – Luxury of the Caliphs – Naval Enterprises on Crete, Sicily, and Rome – Decay and Division of the Empire of the Caliphs – Defeats and Victories of the Greek Emperors – Nicephorus Phocas & Zimisces
53. State of the Eastern Empire in the Tenth Century – Extent and Division – Wealth and Revenue – Palace of Constantinople – Titles and Offices – Pride and Power of the Emperors – Tactics of the Greeks, Arabs, and Franks – The Loss of Latin – Solitude of the Greeks
54. Origin and Doctrine of the Paulicians – Their Persecution by the Greek Emperors – Revolt in Armenia, &c. – Transplantation into Thrace – Propagation in the West – The Seeds and Consequences of the Reformation
55. The Bulgarians – Origin, Migrations, and Settlement of the Hungarians – Their Inroads in the East and West – The Monarchy of Russia – Geography and Trade – Wars of the Russians Against the Greek Empire – Conversion of the Barbarians – Baptism of Wolodomir
56. The Saracens, Franks, and Greeks, in Italy – First Adventures and Settlement of the Normans – Character and Conquests of Robert Guiscard, Duke of Apulia – Deliverance of Sicily by his Brother Roger – Victories of Robert over the Emperors of the East and West – Roger, King of Sicily, Invades Africa and Greece – The Emperor Manuel Comnenus – Wars of the Greeks and Normans – Emperor Henry VI. – Extinction of Normans
57. The Turks of the House of Seljuk – Their Revolt Against Mahmud, Conqueror of Hindostan – Togrul Subdues Persia, and Protects the Caliphs – Defeat and Captivity of the Emperor Romanus Diogenes by Alp Arslan – Power and Magnificence of Malek Shah – Conquest of Asia Minor and Syria – State and Oppression of Jerusalem – Pilgrimages to the Holy Sepulchre
58. Origin and Numbers of the First Crusade – Characters of the Latin Princes – Their March to Constantinople – Policy of the Greek Emperor Alexius – Conquest of Nicaea, Antioch, and Jerusalem, by the Franks – Deliverance of the Holy Sepulcher – Godfrey of Bouillon, First King of Jerusalem – The French or Latin Kingdom
59. Preservation of the Greek Empire – Numbers, Passage, and Events of the Second and Third Crusades – St. Bernard – Reign of Saladin in Egypt and Syria – His Conquest of Jerusalem – Naval Crusades – Richard the First of England – Pope Innocent the Third; and the Fourth and Fifth Crusades – The Emperor Frederick the Second – Louis the Ninth of France; and the Last Two Crusades – Expulsion of the Franks by the Mamelukes
60. Schism of the Greeks and Latins – State of Constantinople – Revolt of the Bulgarians – Isaac Angelus Dethroned by his Brother Alexuis – Origin of the Fourth Crusade – Alliance of the French and Venetians with the son of Isaac – Their Naval Expedition to Constantinople – The Two Sieges, and Final Conquest of the city by the Latins – Sacrilege, Mockers, Destruction
61. Partition of the Empire by the French and Venetians – Five Latin Emperors of the Houses of Flanders and Courtenay – Their Wars Against the Bulgarians and Greeks – Weakness and Poverty of the Latin Empire – Recovery of Constantinople by the Greeks – General Consequences of Crusades – Digression – The Courtenays
62. The Greek Emperors of Nice and Constantinople – Elevation and Reign of Michael Palaeologus – His False Union with the Pope and the Latin Church – Hostile Designs of Charles of Anjou – Revolt of Sicily – War of the Catalans in Asia and Greece – Revolutions and Present State of Athens – Its People Elude Tyranny
63. Civil Wars, and Ruin of the Greek Empire – Reigns of Andronicus, the Elder and Younger, and John Palaeologus – Regency, Revolt, Reign, and Abdication, of John Cantacuzene – Establishment of a Genoese Colony at Pera or Galata – Their Wars with the Empire and City of Constantinople – Genoese Victory over Venetians
64. Conquests of Zingis Khan and the Moguls from China to Poland – Escape of Constantinople and the Greeks – Origin of the Ottoman Turks in Bithynia – Reigns and Victories of Othman, Orchan, Amurath the First, and Bajazet the First – Foundation and Progress of the Turkish Monarchy in Asia and Europe – Danger of Constantinople and the Greek Empire – John Palaeologus
65. Elevation of Timour, or Tamberlane, to the Throne of Samarcand – His Conquests in Persia, Georgia, Tartary, Russia, India, Syria, and Anatolia – His Turkish War – Defeat and Captivity of Bajazet – Death of Timour – Civil War of the Sons of Bajazet – Restoration of the Turkish Monarchy by Mahomet the First – Siege of Constantinople by Amurath the Second – Turkish Merit
66. Applications of the Eastern Emperors to the Popes – Visits to the West, of John the First, Manuel, and John the Second, Palaeologus – Union of the Greek and Latin Churches, Promoted by the Council of Basil, and Concluded at Ferrara and Florence – State of Literature at Constantinople – Its Revival in Italy by the Greek Fugitives – Curiosity & Emulation of the Latins
67. Schism of the Greeks and Latins – Reign and Character of Amurath the Second – Crusade of Ladislaus, King of Hungary – His Defeat and Death – John Huniades – Scanderbeg – Constantine Palaeologus, Last Emperor of the East – Embassies of Phranza – Byzantine Court
68. Reign and Character of Mahomet the Second – Siege, Assault, and Final Conquest, of Constantinople, by the Turks – Death of Constantine Palaeologus – Servitude of the Greeks – Extinction of the Roman Empire in the East – Consternation of Europe – Conquests and Death of Mahomet the Second – His Lofty Aspirations
69. State of Rome from the Twelfth Century – Temporal Dominion of the Popes – Seditions of the City – Political Heresy of Arnold of Brescia – Restoration of the Republic – The Senators – Pride of the Romans – Their Wars – They are Deprived of the Election and Presence of the Popes, who Retire to Avignon – The Jubilee – Noble Families of Rome – Colonna and Ursini Feud
70. Character and Coronation of Petrarch – Restoration of the Freedom and Government of Rome by the Tribune Rienzi – His Virtues and Vices, His Expulsion and Death – Return of the Popes from Avignon – Great Schism of the West – Re-Union of the Latin Church – Last Struggles of Roman Liberty – Statues of Rome – Final Settlement of the Ecclesiastical Government
71. Prospect of the Ruins of Rome in the Fifteenth Century – Four Causes of Decay and Destruction – Example of the Colosseum – Ignorance and Barbarism of Romans – Renovation of the City – Conclusion
