= Oliver Farrar Emerson =

American educator and philologist (1860–1927)

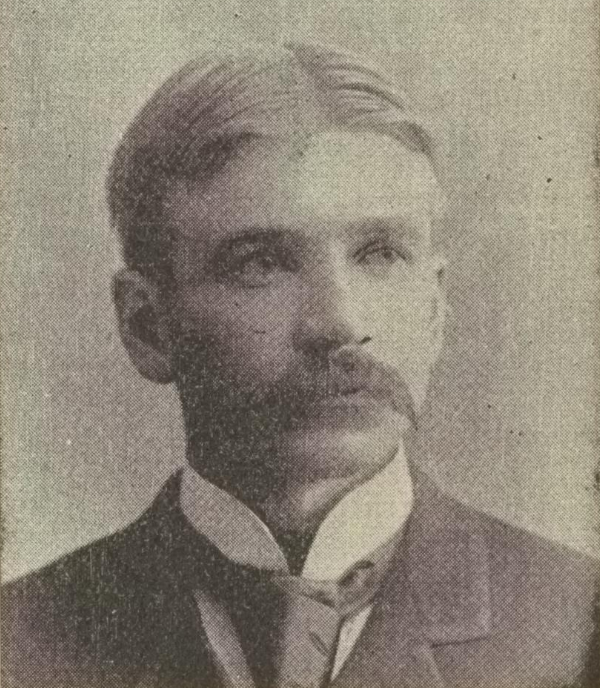
- Born: May 25, 1860; Traer, Iowa, U.S.
- Died: March 13, 1927 (aged 66); Ocala, Florida, U.S.

Academic background
- Education: Case Western Reserve University; Cornell University

Academic work
- Discipline: Philology
- Institutions: Cornell University; Case Western Reserve University

Oliver Farrar Emerson (May 24, 1860 - March 13, 1927) was a United States educator and philologist noted for Chaucer scholarship and his History of the English Language.

== Biography ==
Emerson was born in Traer, Iowa, on May 24, 1860. He studied at Iowa College, taking a post graduate course at Cornell University, where he received the degree of D.Ph. in 1891. After serving as superintendent of schools in Grinnell and Muscatine, Iowa, he was principal of the Academy of Iowa College (1885–88), instructor in English (1889–91) Cornell University and assistant professor of rhetoric and English philology in the same institution (1892–96), when he took the same chair at Adelbert College of Western Reserve University. He became Oviatt Professor of English at Case Western in 1906, and was head of the English department.

He was a member of the Modern Language Association, American Dialect Society and the Simplified Spelling Board. During his career at Case Western, he resided in East Cleveland and founded the Novel Club. He was married to Annie Laurie Logan of St. Louis, with whom he had a son and a daughter. He died in Ocala, Florida March 13, 1927

== Writings ==
He was a regular contributor to various philological journals and magazines. In addition, he wrote:

- History of the English Language (1894)
- A Brief History of the English Language (1896)
- Memoirs of the Life and Writings of Edward Gibbon (1898)
- A Middle English Reader (1905)
- Outline History of the English Language (1906)

He edited:

- Dr. Johnson's Rasselas (1895)
- Poems of Chaucer (1911)
