= Edward Gibbon =

British essayist, historian and politician (1737–1794)

Edward Gibbon FRS
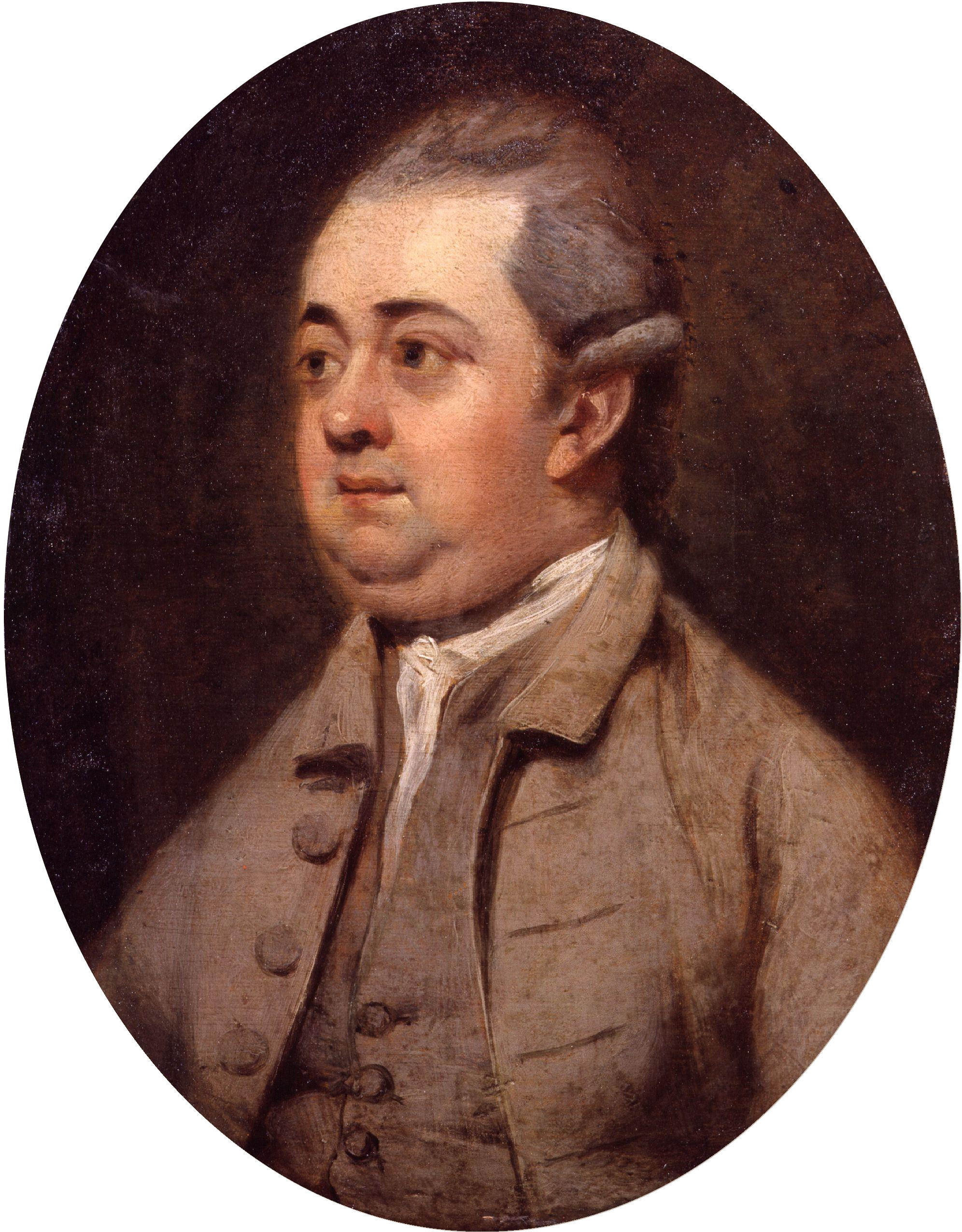
- Portrait by Henry Walton, 1773

Member of Parliament for Lymington
- In office 1781–1784
- Preceded by: Samuel Salt; Edward Eliot
- Succeeded by: Samuel Salt; Wilbraham Tollemache

Member of Parliament for Liskeard
- In office 1774–1780
- Preceded by: Harry Burrard; Thomas Dummer
- Succeeded by: Harry Burrard; William Manning

Personal details
- Born: 8 May 1737 Putney, Surrey, England
- Died: 16 January 1794 (aged 56) London, England
- Party: Whig
- Education: Magdalen College, Oxford
- Occupation: Politician
- Profession: Essayist, historian
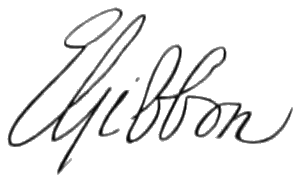
- Signature

Edward Gibbon (/ˈɡɪbən/; 8 May 1737 – 16 January 1794) was a British essayist, historian and politician. His most important and influential work, The History of the Decline and Fall of the Roman Empire, was published in six volumes between 1776 and 1789, to critical and commercial success. It is known for the quality and irony of its prose, its use of primary sources, and its polemical criticism of organised religion.

== Early life: 1737–1752 ==
Edward Gibbon was born in 1737, the son of Edward and Judith Gibbon, at Lime Grove in the town of Putney, Surrey. He had five brothers and one sister, all of whom died in infancy. His grandfather, also named Edward, had lost his assets as a result of the South Sea bubble stock-market collapse in 1720 but eventually regained much of his wealth. Gibbon's father thus inherited a substantial estate. His paternal grandmother, Catherine Acton, was granddaughter of Sir Walter Acton, 2nd Baronet. Gibbon described himself as "a puny child, neglected by my Mother, starved by my nurse." At age nine, he was sent to Dr. Woddeson's school at Kingston upon Thames (now Kingston Grammar School), shortly after which his mother died. He then took up residence in the Westminster School boarding house, owned by his adored "Aunt Kitty", Catherine Porten. Soon after she died in 1786, he remembered her as rescuing him from his mother's disdain, and imparting "the first rudiments of knowledge, the first exercise of reason, and a taste for books which is still the pleasure and glory of my life". From 1747 Gibbon spent time at the family home in Buriton. By 1751, Gibbon's reading was already extensive and pointed toward his future pursuits: Laurence Echard's Roman History (1713), William Howel(l)'s An Institution of General History (1680–85), and several of the 65 volumes of the acclaimed Universal History from the Earliest Account of Time (1747–1768).

== Career ==
=== Oxford, Lausanne, and a religious journey: 1752–1758 ===
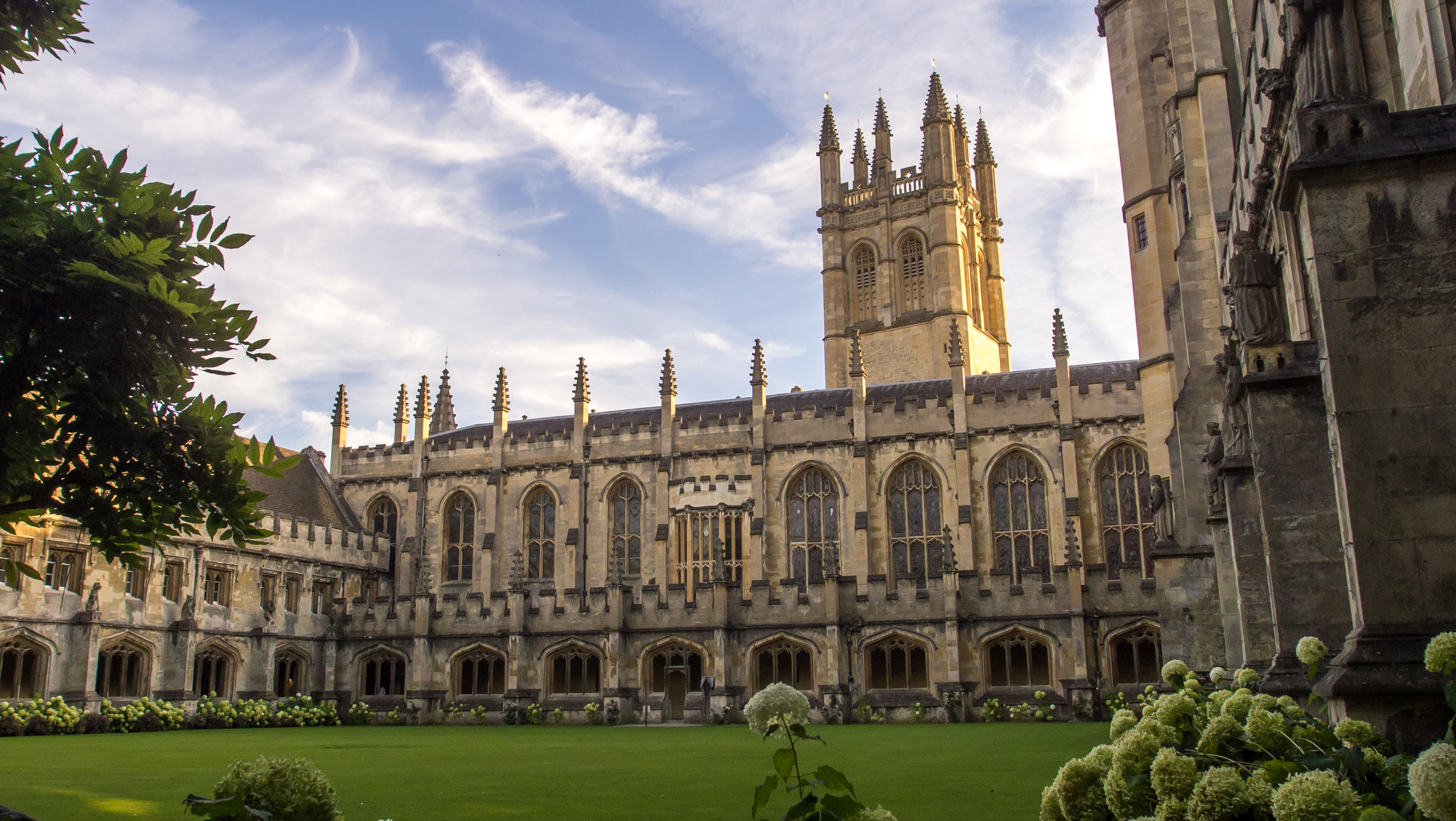
Magdalen College, Oxford

Following a stay at Bath in 1752 to improve his health at the age of 15, Gibbon was sent by his father to Magdalen College, Oxford, where he was enrolled as a gentleman-commoner. He was ill-suited, however, to the college atmosphere, and later rued his 14 months there as the "most idle and unprofitable" of his life. Because he says so in his autobiography, it used to be thought that a penchant from his aunt for "theological controversy" bloomed under the influence of the deist or rationalist theologian Conyers Middleton (1683–1750), the author of Free Inquiry into the Miraculous Powers (1749). In that tract, Middleton denied the validity of such powers; Gibbon promptly objected, or so the argument used to run. The product of that disagreement, with some assistance from the work of Catholic Bishop Jacques-Bénigne Bossuet (1627–1704), and that of the Elizabethan Jesuit Robert Parsons (1546–1610), yielded the most memorable event of his time at Oxford: his conversion to Roman Catholicism on 8 June 1753. He was further "corrupted" by the 'free thinking' deism of the playwright and poet David Mallet; and finally Gibbon's father, already "in despair," had had enough. David Womersley has shown, however, that Gibbon's claim to having been converted by a reading of Middleton is very unlikely, and was introduced only into the final draft of the "Memoirs" in 1792–93.

Within weeks of his conversion, he was removed from Oxford and sent to live under the care and tutelage of Daniel Pavillard, Reformed pastor of Lausanne, Switzerland. There, he made one of his life's two great friendships, that of Jacques Georges Deyverdun (the French-language translator of Goethe's The Sorrows of Young Werther), and that of John Baker Holroyd (later Lord Sheffield). Just a year and a half later, after his father threatened to disinherit him, on Christmas Day, 1754, he reconverted to Protestantism. "The various articles of the Romish creed," he wrote, "disappeared like a dream".

=== Thwarted romance ===
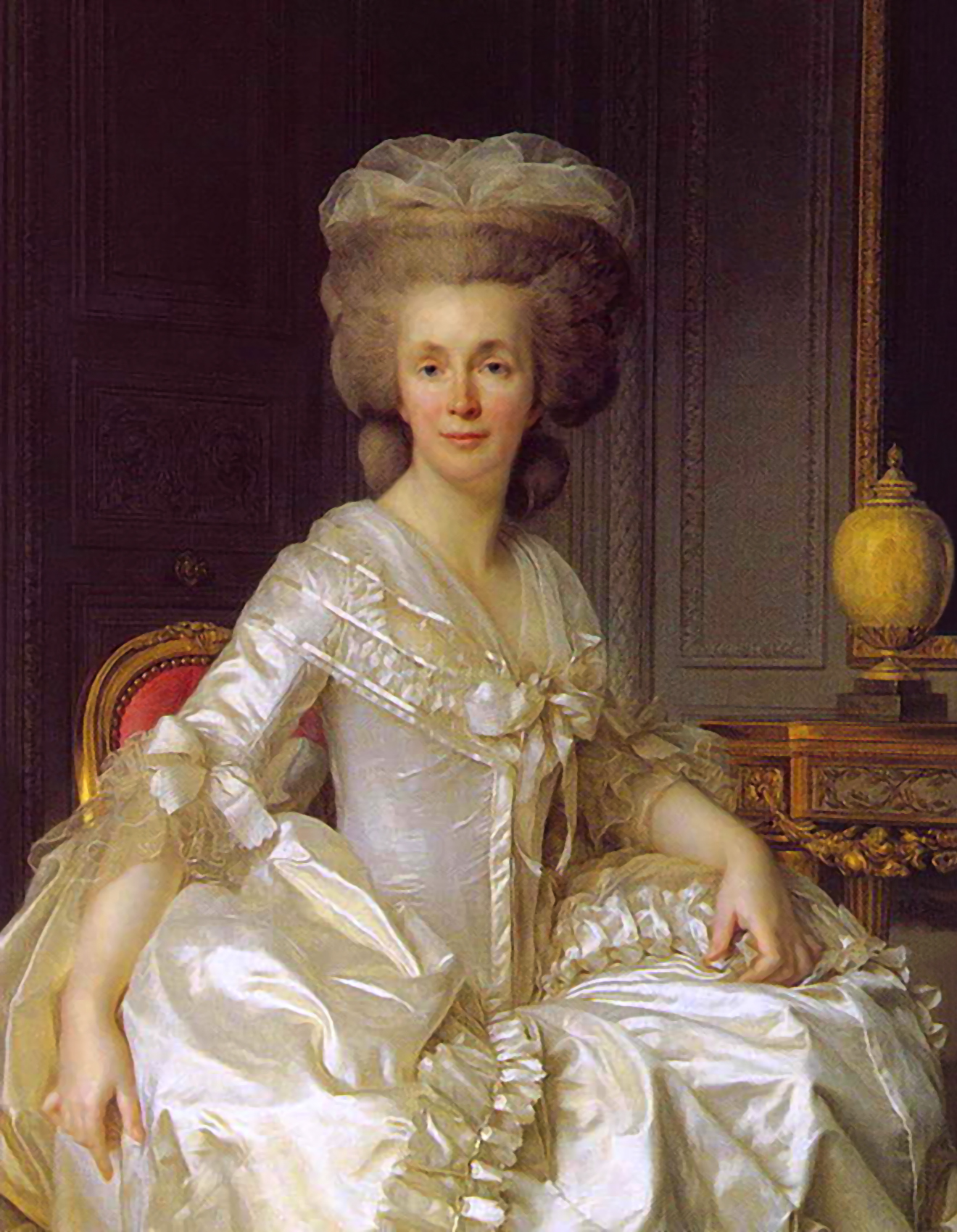
Suzanne Curchod

He also met the one romance in his life: the daughter of the pastor of Crassy, a young woman named Suzanne Curchod, who was later to become the wife of Louis XVI's finance minister Jacques Necker, and the mother of Madame de Staël. The two developed a warm affinity; Gibbon proceeded to propose marriage, but ultimately this was out of the question, blocked both by his father's staunch disapproval and Curchod's equally staunch reluctance to leave Switzerland. Gibbon returned to England in August 1758 to face his father. No refusal of the elder's wishes could be allowed. Gibbon put it this way: "I sighed as a lover, I obeyed as a son." He proceeded to cut off all contact with Curchod, even as she vowed to wait for him. Their final emotional break apparently came at Ferney, France, in early 1764, though they did see each other at least one more time, a year later.

=== First fame and the Grand tour: 1758–1765 ===
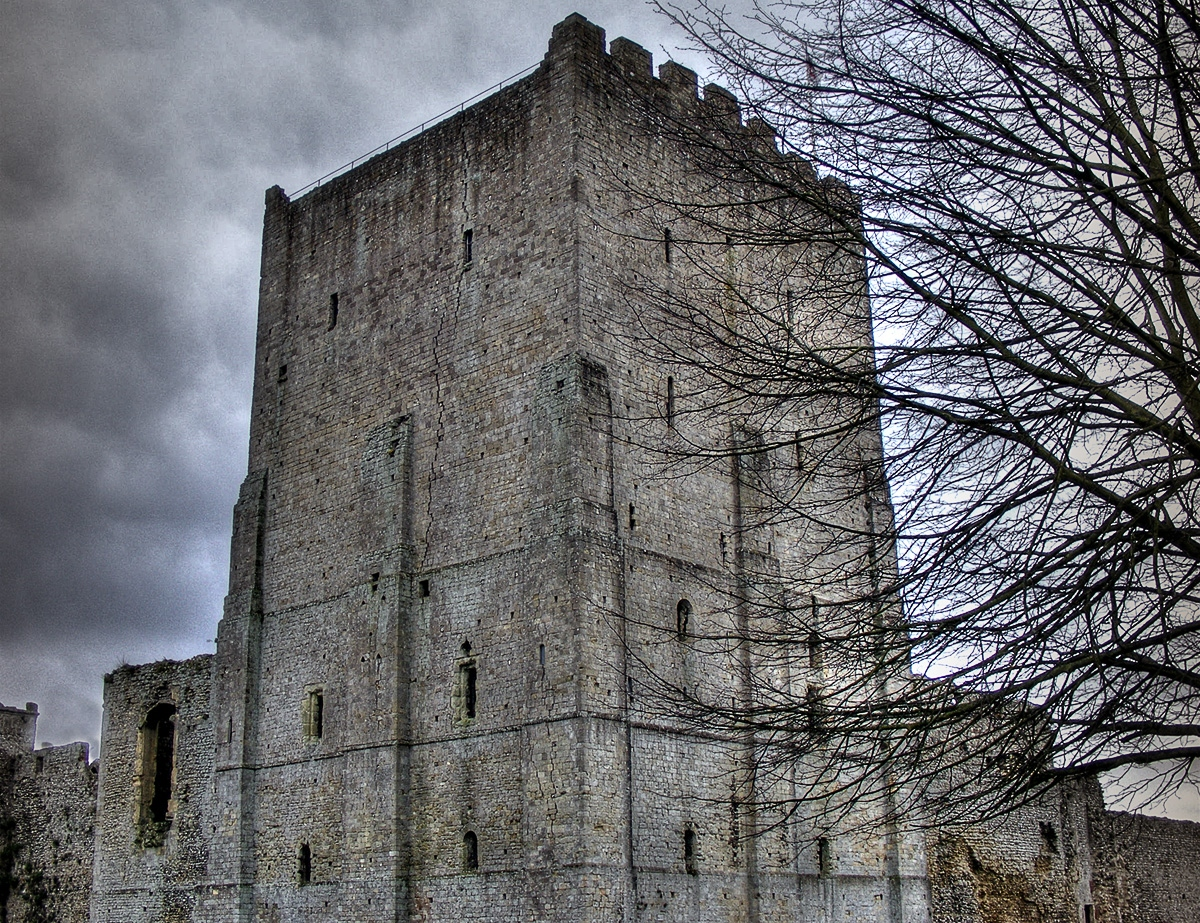
Portchester Castle came under Gibbon's command for a brief period while he was an officer in the South Hampshire Militia.

Upon his return to England, Gibbon published his first book, Essai sur l'Étude de la Littérature in 1761, which produced an initial taste of celebrity and distinguished him, in Paris at least, as a man of letters.

On 12 June 1759 Gibbon was commissioned as a Captain in the South Hampshire Militia when that regiment was embodied during the Seven Years' War (his father served as the regiment's Major). For the next three years he commanded the regiment's Grenadier Company in home defence. The militia was disembodied in December 1762 but he remained an officer in the regiment, resigning as a Lieutenant-Colonel in 1770. Gibbon later credited his militia service with providing him "a larger introduction into the English world." There was further, the matter of a vast utility: "The discipline and evolutions of a modern battalion gave me a clearer notion of the phalanx and the legion; and the captain of the Hampshire grenadiers (the reader may smile) has not been useless to the historian of the Roman empire."

In 1763 he returned, via Paris, to Lausanne, where he made the acquaintance of a "prudent worthy young man" William Guise. On 18 April 1764, he and Guise set off for Italy, crossed the Alps, and after spending the summer in Florence arrived in Rome, via Lucca, Pisa, Livorno and Siena, in early October. In his autobiography, Gibbon vividly records his rapture when he finally neared "the great object of [my] pilgrimage":

...at the distance of twenty-five years I can neither forget nor express the strong emotions which agitated my mind as I first approached and entered the eternal City. After a sleepless night, I trod, with a lofty step the ruins of the Forum; each memorable spot where Romulus stood, or Tully spoke, or Caesar fell, was at once present to my eye; and several days of intoxication were lost or enjoyed before I could descend to a cool and minute investigation.

Here, Gibbon first conceived the idea of composing a history of the city, later extended to the entire empire, a moment he described later as his "Capitoline vision":

It was at Rome, on the fifteenth of October 1764, as I sat musing amidst the ruins of the Capitol, while the barefooted fryars were singing vespers in the temple of Jupiter, that the idea of writing the decline and fall of the City first started to my mind.

Womersley notes the existence of "good reasons" to doubt the statement's accuracy. Elaborating, Pocock ("Classical History," ¶ #2) refers to it as a likely "creation of memory" or a "literary invention", given that Gibbon, in his autobiography, claimed that his journal dated the reminiscence to 15 October, when in fact the journal gives no date.

=== Late career: 1765–1776 ===
==== Work ====
In June 1765, Gibbon returned to his father's house, remaining there until the latter's death in 1770. These five years were considered by Gibbon as the worst of his life, but he tried to remain busy by making early attempts at full histories. His first historical narrative, known as the History of Switzerland, representing Gibbon's love for Switzerland, was never finished nor published. Even under the guidance of Deyverdun, his German translator, Gibbon became too self-critical and completely abandoned the project after writing only 60 pages of text.

Soon after abandoning his History of Switzerland, Gibbon made another attempt towards completing a full history. His second work, Memoires Litteraires de la Grande Bretagne, was a two-volume set describing the literary and social conditions of England at the time, such as Lord Lyttelton's history of Henry II and Nathaniel Lardner's The Credibility of the Gospel History. Gibbon's Memoires Litteraires failed to gain any notoriety and was considered a flop by fellow historians and literary scholars.

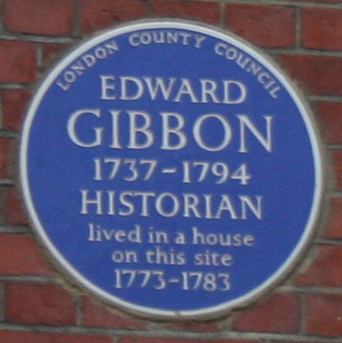
Blue plaque to Gibbon on Bentinck Street, London

After he tended to his father's estate—which was in poor condition—enough remained for Gibbon to settle fashionably in London at 7 Bentinck Street free of financial concern. By February 1773, he was writing in earnest, but not without the occasional self-imposed distraction. He took to London society quite easily, joined the better social clubs (including Dr. Johnson's Literary Club), and looked in from time to time on his friend Holroyd in Sussex. He succeeded Oliver Goldsmith at the Royal Academy as 'professor in ancient history', an honorary but prestigious position. In late 1774, he was initiated as a Freemason of the Premier Grand Lodge of England.

He was also, perhaps least productively in that same year, returned to the House of Commons for Liskeard, Cornwall through the intervention of his relative and patron, Edward Eliot. He became the archetypal back-bencher, benignly "mute" and "indifferent," his support of the Whig ministry invariably automatic. Gibbon lost the Liskeard seat in 1780 when Eliot joined the opposition, taking with him "the Electors of Leskeard [who] are commonly of the same opinion as Mr. El[l]iot." (Murray, p. 322.) The following year, owing to the good grace of Prime Minister Lord North, he was again returned to Parliament, this time for Lymington on a by-election.

==== The History of the Decline and Fall of the Roman Empire: 1776–1788 ====
After several rewrites, with Gibbon "often tempted to throw away the labours of seven years," the first volume of what was to become his life's major achievement, The History of the Decline and Fall of the Roman Empire, was published on 17 February 1776. Through 1777, the reading public eagerly consumed three editions, for which Gibbon was rewarded handsomely: two-thirds of the profits, amounting to approximately £1,000 (equivalent of around £210,000 in 2025).

Volumes II and III appeared on 1 March 1781, eventually rising "to a level with the previous volume in general esteem." Volume IV was finished in June 1784; the final two were completed during a second Lausanne sojourn (September 1783 to August 1787) where Gibbon reunited with his friend Deyverdun in leisurely comfort. By early 1787, he was "straining for the goal" and with great relief the project was finished in June. Gibbon later wrote:

It was on the day, or rather the night, of 27 June 1787, between the hours of eleven and twelve, that I wrote the last lines of the last page in a summer-house in my garden...I will not dissemble the first emotions of joy on the recovery of my freedom, and perhaps the establishment of my fame. But my pride was soon humbled, and a sober melancholy was spread over my mind by the idea that I had taken my everlasting leave of an old and agreeable companion, and that, whatsoever might be the future fate of my history, the life of the historian must be short and precarious.

Volumes IV, V, and VI finally reached the press in May 1788, their publication having been delayed since March so it could coincide with a dinner party celebrating Gibbon's 51st birthday (the 8th). Mounting a bandwagon of praise for the later volumes were such contemporary luminaries as Adam Smith, William Robertson, Adam Ferguson, Lord Camden, and Horace Walpole. Adam Smith told Gibbon that "by the universal assent of every man of taste and learning, whom I either know or correspond with, it sets you at the very head of the whole literary tribe at present existing in Europe." In November 1788, he was elected a Fellow of the Royal Society, the main proposer being his good friend Lord Sheffield.

In 1783 Gibbon had been intrigued by the cleverness of Sheffield's 12-year-old eldest daughter, Maria, and he proposed to teach her himself. Over the following years he continued, creating a girl of sixteen who was both well educated, confident and determined to choose her own husband. Gibbon described her as a "mixture of just observation and lively imagery, the strong sense of a man expressed with the easy elegance of a female".

== Later life: 1789–1794 ==
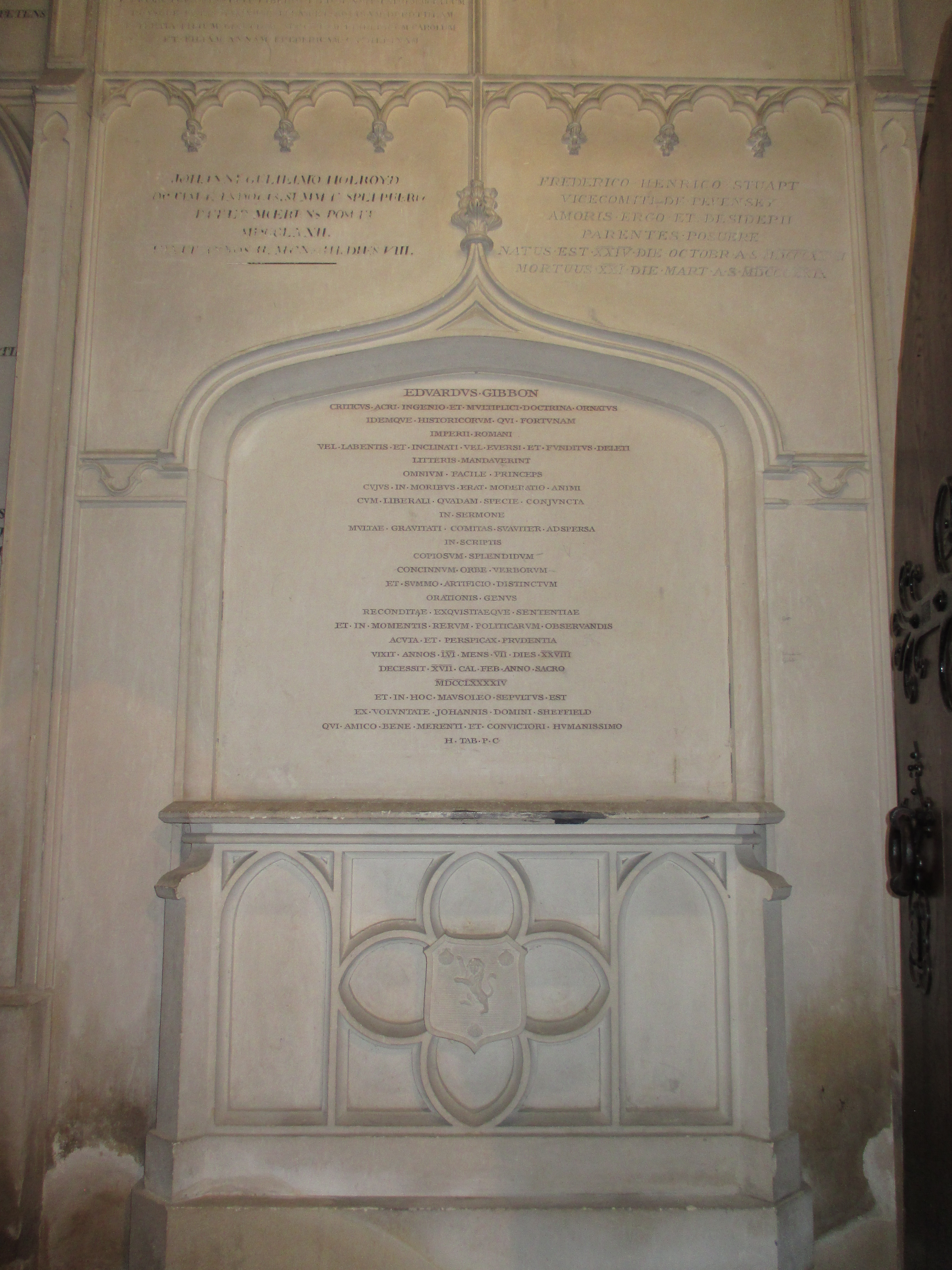
Gibbon's memorial tablet on the Sheffield Mausoleum in St Andrew & St Mary The Virgin's church in Fletching, East Sussex

The years following Gibbon's completion of The History were filled largely with sorrow and increasing physical discomfort. He had returned to London in late 1787 to oversee the publication process alongside Lord Sheffield. With that accomplished, in 1789 it was back to Lausanne only to learn of and be "deeply affected" by the death of Deyverdun, who had willed Gibbon his home, La Grotte. He resided there with little commotion, took in the local society, received a visit from Sheffield in 1791, and "shared the common abhorrence" of the French Revolution. In 1793, word came of Lady Sheffield's death; Gibbon immediately left Lausanne and set sail to comfort a grieving but composed Sheffield. His health began to fail critically in December, and at the turn of the new year, he was on his last legs.

Among Edward Gibbon's maladies was gout. Gibbon is also believed to have suffered from an extreme case of scrotal swelling, probably a hydrocele testis, a condition that causes the scrotum to swell with fluid in a compartment overlying either testicle. In an age when close-fitting clothes were fashionable, his condition led to a chronic and disfiguring inflammation that left Gibbon a lonely figure. As his condition worsened, he underwent numerous procedures to alleviate the condition, but with no enduring success. In early January, the last of a series of three operations caused an unremitting peritonitis to set in and spread, from which he died.

The "English giant of the Enlightenment" finally succumbed at 12:45 pm, 16 January 1794 at age 56. He was buried in the Sheffield Mausoleum attached to the north transept of the Church of St Mary and St Andrew, Fletching, East Sussex, having died in Fletching while staying with his great friend, Lord Sheffield. Gibbon's estate was valued at approximately £26,000. He left most of his property to cousins. As stipulated in his will, Sheffield oversaw the sale of his library at auction to William Beckford for £950. What happened next suggests that Beckford may have known of Gibbon's moralistic, 'impertinent animadversion' at his expense in the presence of the Duchess of Devonshire at Lausanne. Gibbon's wish that his 6,000-book library would not be locked up 'under the key of a jealous master' was effectively denied by Beckford who retained it in Lausanne until 1801 before inspecting it, then locking it up again until at least as late as 1818 before giving most of the books back to Gibbon's physician Dr Scholl who had helped negotiate the sale in the first place. Beckford's annotated copy of the Decline and Fall turned up in Christie's in 1953, complete with his critique of what he considered the author's 'ludicrous self-complacency ... your frequent distortion of historical Truth to provoke a gibe, or excite a sneer ... your ignorance of oriental languages [etc.]'.

== Legacy ==
A view frequently attributed to Gibbon, that the Roman Empire fell due to its embrace of Christianity, is not widely accepted by scholars today. Gibbon argued that with the empire's new Christian character, large sums of wealth that would have otherwise been used in secular affairs, promoting the state, were transferred to promoting the activities of the Church. However, the pre-Christian empire also spent large financial sums on religious affairs and it is unclear whether or not the change of religion increased the resources the empire spent on religion. Gibbon further argued that the new attitudes introduced by Christianity caused many Christians of wealth to renounce their lifestyles and enter hermitages or monasteries, and so stop participating in the support of the empire. However, while many Christians of wealth did become monastics, their numbers paled in comparison to the numbers of participants in the imperial bureaucracy. Although Gibbon further pointed out that the emphasis Christianity placed on peace caused a decline in the number of people serving the military, the decline was so small as to be negligible for the army's effectiveness.

Many scholars argue that Gibbon did not in fact blame Christianity for the decline and fall of the empire. Rather, he attributed them to the effects of luxury and the consequent erosion of the Romans' martial character. Such a view echoes the outlook of the Greek historian Polybius, who similarly explained the eclipse of the decadent Greek world by the ascendant Roman Republic in Mediterranean affairs. In this understanding of Gibbon, the process of Rome's decay was well under way before Christian adherents had become a large proportion of the population. Hence, although Gibbon might have seen Christianity as hastening Rome's fall, he did not consider it as the root cause.

Gibbon's work has been criticised for its scathing view of the Christian church, as laid down in chapters XV and XVI, which resulted in the banning of the book in several countries. Gibbon was accused of disrespecting Christian doctrine by "treat[ing] the Christian church as a phenomenon of general history, not a special case admitting supernatural explanations and disallowing criticism of its adherents". More specifically, the chapters excoriated the church for "supplanting in an unnecessarily destructive way the great culture that preceded it", and for "the outrage of [practising] religious intolerance and warfare".

In letters to Holroyd and others, Gibbon showed that he expected some church-inspired backlash, but the harshness of the ensuing criticisms exceeded anything he or his friends had anticipated. Contemporary detractors such as Joseph Priestley and Richard Watson stoked the nascent fire, but the most severe of the attacks was an "acrimonious" piece by the young cleric Henry Edwards Davis. In 1779 Gibbon published a Vindication of chapters XV and XVI.

Gibbon's apparent antagonism to Christian doctrine spilled over into hostility to Judaism, leading to charges of anti-Semitism. For example, he wrote:

From the reign of Nero to that of Antoninus Pius, the Jews discovered a fierce impatience of the dominion of Rome, which repeatedly broke out in the most furious massacres and insurrections. Humanity is shocked at the recital of the horrid cruelties which they committed in the cities of Egypt, of Cyprus, and of Cyrene, where they dwelt in treacherous friendship with the unsuspecting natives; and we are tempted to applaud the severe retaliation which was exercised by the arms of legions against a race of fanatics, whose dire and credulous superstition seemed to render them the implacable enemies not only of the Roman government, but also of mankind.

=== Influence ===
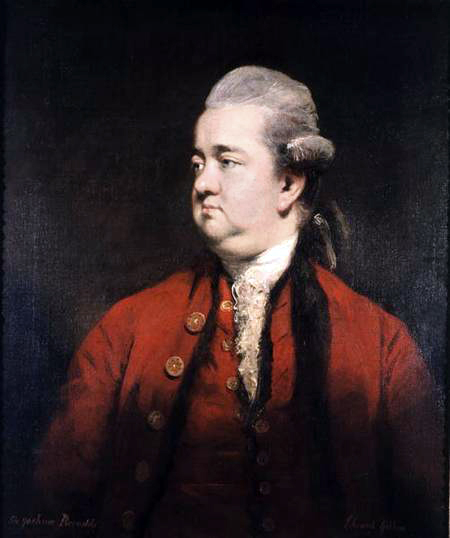
1779 portrait of Gibbon by Sir Joshua Reynolds

Gibbon is considered to be a son of the Enlightenment and this is reflected in his famous verdict on the history of the Middle Ages: "I have described the triumph of barbarism and religion." Politically, he rejected the radical egalitarian movements of the time, notably the American and French Revolutions, and dismissed overly rationalistic applications of the rights of man.

Gibbon's work has been praised for its style, its piquant epigrams and its effective irony. Winston Churchill wrote in My Early Life, "I set out upon ... Gibbon's Decline and Fall of the Roman Empire [and] was immediately dominated both by the story and the style. ... I devoured Gibbon. I rode triumphantly through it from end to end and enjoyed it all." Churchill modelled much of his own literary style on Gibbon's. Like Gibbon, he dedicated himself to producing a "vivid historical narrative, ranging widely over period and place and enriched by analysis and reflection".

Unusually for the 18th century, Gibbon was never content with secondhand accounts when the primary sources were accessible, though most of these were drawn from well-known printed editions. "I have always endeavoured," he wrote, "to draw from the fountain-head; that my curiosity, as well as a sense of duty, has always urged me to study the originals; and that, if they have sometimes eluded my search, I have carefully marked the secondary evidence, on whose faith a passage or a fact were reduced to depend." In this insistence upon the importance of primary sources, Gibbon is considered by many to be one of the first modern historians:

In accuracy, thoroughness, lucidity, and comprehensive grasp of a vast subject, the 'History' is unsurpassable. It is the one English history which may be regarded as definitive...Whatever its shortcomings the book is artistically imposing as well as historically unimpeachable as a vast panorama of a great period.

The subject of Gibbon's writing, as well as his ideas and style, have influenced other writers. Besides his influence on Churchill, Gibbon was also a model for Isaac Asimov in his writing of The Foundation Trilogy, which, Asimov wrote, involved "a little bit of cribbin' from the works of Edward Gibbon".

Evelyn Waugh admired Gibbon's style but not his secularism. In Waugh's novel Helena (1950), the early Christian author Lactantius worries about the possibility of "'a false historian, with the mind of Cicero or Tacitus and the soul of an animal,' and he nodded towards the gibbon who fretted his golden chain and chattered for fruit".

== Monographs by Gibbon ==
- Essai sur l’Étude de la Littérature (London: Becket & De Hondt, 1761).
- Critical Observations on the Sixth Book of [Vergil's] 'The Aeneid' (London: Elmsley, 1770).
- The History of the Decline and Fall of the Roman Empire (vol. I, 1776; vols. II, III, 1781; vols. IV, V, VI, 1788–1789). all London: Strahan & Cadell.
- A Vindication of some passages in the fifteenth and sixteenth chapters of the History of the Decline and Fall of the Roman Empire (London: J. Dodsley, 1779).
- Mémoire Justificatif pour servir de Réponse à l’Exposé, etc. de la Cour de France (London: Harrison & Brooke, 1779).

== Other writings by Gibbon ==
- "Lettre sur le gouvernement de Berne" [Letter No. IX. Mr. Gibbon to *** on the Government of Berne], in Miscellaneous Works, First (1796) edition, vol. 1 (below). Scholars differ on the date of its composition (Norman, D.M. Low: 1758–59; Pocock: 1763–64).
- Mémoires Littéraires de la Grande-Bretagne. co-author: Georges Deyverdun (2 vols.: vol. 1, London: Becket & De Hondt, 1767; vol. 2, London: Heydinger, 1768).
- Miscellaneous Works of Edward Gibbon, Esq., ed. John Lord Sheffield (2 vols., London: Cadell & Davies, 1796; 5 vols., London: J. Murray, 1814; 3 vols., London: J. Murray, 1815). Includes Memoirs of the Life and Writings of Edward Gibbon, Esq..
- Autobiographies of Edward Gibbon, ed. John Murray (London: J. Murray, 1896). EG's complete memoirs (six drafts) from the original manuscripts.
- The Private Letters of Edward Gibbon, 2 vols., ed. Rowland E. Prothero (London: J. Murray, 1896).
- The works of Edward Gibbon, Volume 3 1906.
- Gibbon's Journal to 28 January 1763, ed. D.M. Low (London: Chatto and Windus, 1929).
- Le Journal de Gibbon à Lausanne, ed. Georges A. Bonnard (Lausanne: Librairie de l'Université, 1945).
- Miscellanea Gibboniana, eds. G.R. de Beer, L. Junod, G.A. Bonnard (Lausanne: Librairie de l'Université, 1952).
- The Letters of Edward Gibbon, 3 vols., ed. J.E. Norton (London: Cassell & Co., 1956). vol. 1: 1750–1773; vol. 2: 1774–1784; vol. 3: 1784–1794. cited as 'Norton, Letters'.
- Gibbon's Journey from Geneva to Rome, ed. G.A. Bonnard (London: Thomas Nelson and Sons, 1961). journal.
- Edward Gibbon: Memoirs of My Life, ed. G.A. Bonnard (New York: Funk & Wagnalls, 1969; 1966). portions of EG's memoirs arranged chronologically, omitting repetition.
- The English Essays of Edward Gibbon, ed. Patricia Craddock (Oxford: Clarendon Press, 1972); hb: ISBN 0-19-812496-1.

== See also ==
- The Work of J.G.A. Pocock: Edward Gibbon section
- The History of the Decline and Fall of the Roman Empire: Further reading
- The Miscellaneous Works of Edward Gibbon
- A Gibbon chronology
- Historiography of the United Kingdom

== Notes ==
Most of this article, including quotations unless otherwise noted, has been adapted from Stephen's entry on Edward Gibbon in the Dictionary of National Biography.

Parliament of Great Britain
Preceded by Samuel Salt; Edward Eliot	Member of Parliament for Liskeard; 1774–1780; With: Samuel Salt	Succeeded by Samuel Salt; Wilbraham Tollemache
Preceded by Harry Burrard; Thomas Dummer	Member of Parliament for Lymington; 1781–1784; With: Harry Burrard	Succeeded by Harry Burrard; William Manning
