= Paul Falconer Poole =

English painter

Paul Falconer Poole RA
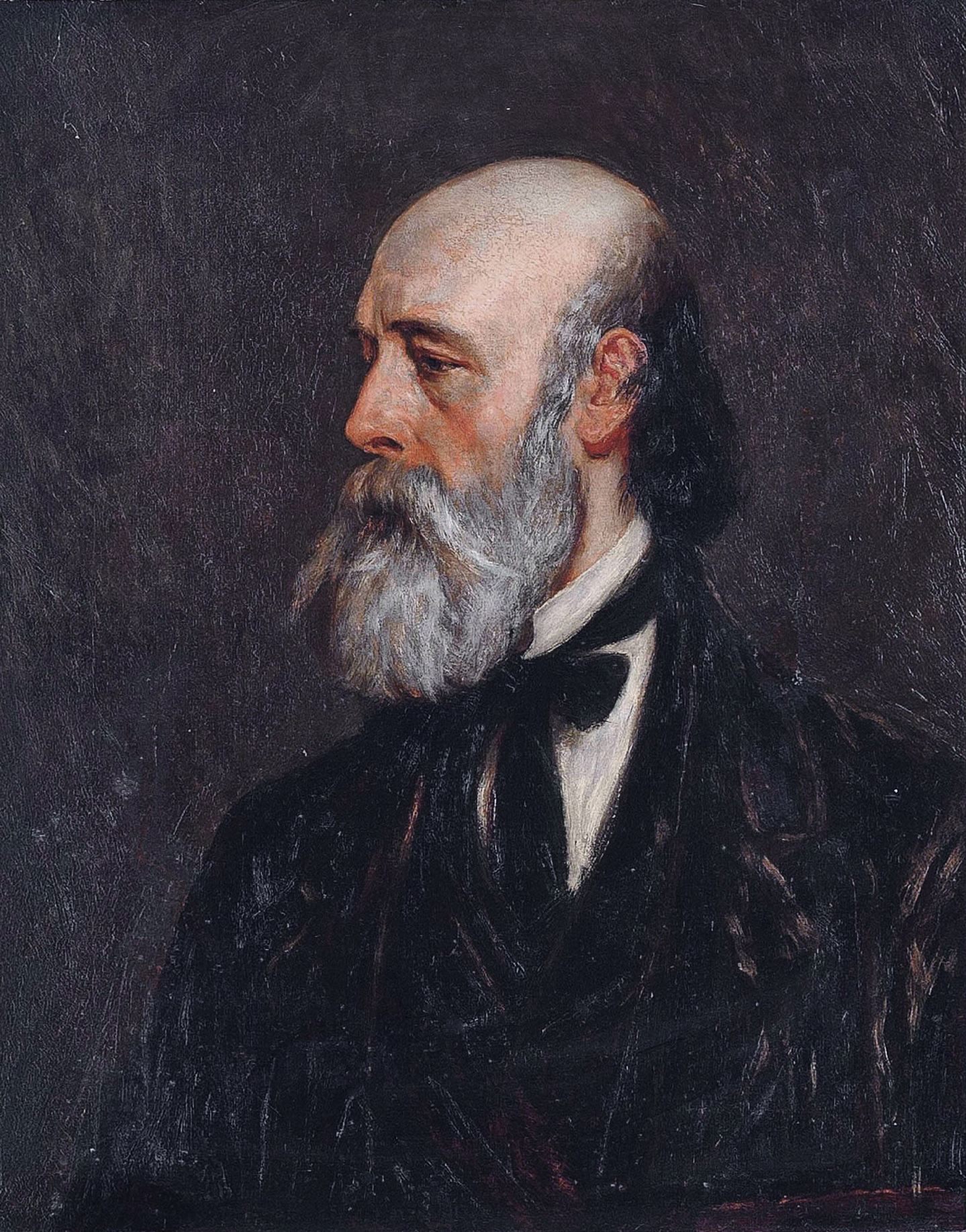
- Portrait by John Dawson Watson
- Born: 28 December 1807; Bristol, England
- Died: 22 September 1879 (aged 71); London, England
- Resting place: Highgate Cemetery
- Known for: Painting
- Style: subject and genre Paintings

Paul Falconer Poole RA (1807–1879) was a British subject and genre painter. Though self-taught, his feeling for colour, poetic sympathy, and dramatic power gained Poole a high position among British artists.

== Early life ==
Paul Falconer Poole was born on 28 December 1807 at 43 College Street in Bristol, England, the fourth son of James Paul Poole, a Bristol coal merchant.

== Career ==
Poole exhibited his first work in the Royal Academy at the age of twenty-five, the subject being The Well, a scene in Naples. There was an interval of seven years before he next exhibited his Farewell, Farewell in 1837, which was followed by the Emigrant's Departure, Hermann and Dorothea and By the Waters of Babylon. In 1843, his position was made secure by his Solomon Eagle, and by his success in the Cartoon Exhibition, in which he received from the Fine Art Commissioners a prize of £300 sterling.

After his exhibition of the Surrender of Syon House, he was elected an associate of the Royal Academy in 1846, and was made an academician in 1861. In the 1850s, he lived at 43 Camden Road Villas (now 203 Camden Rd) near Camden Town.

== Personal life ==
Poole was a close friend of landscape artist Thomas Danby (c. 1818–1886) with whom he shared a house in Hampstead, London for a time.

== Death ==
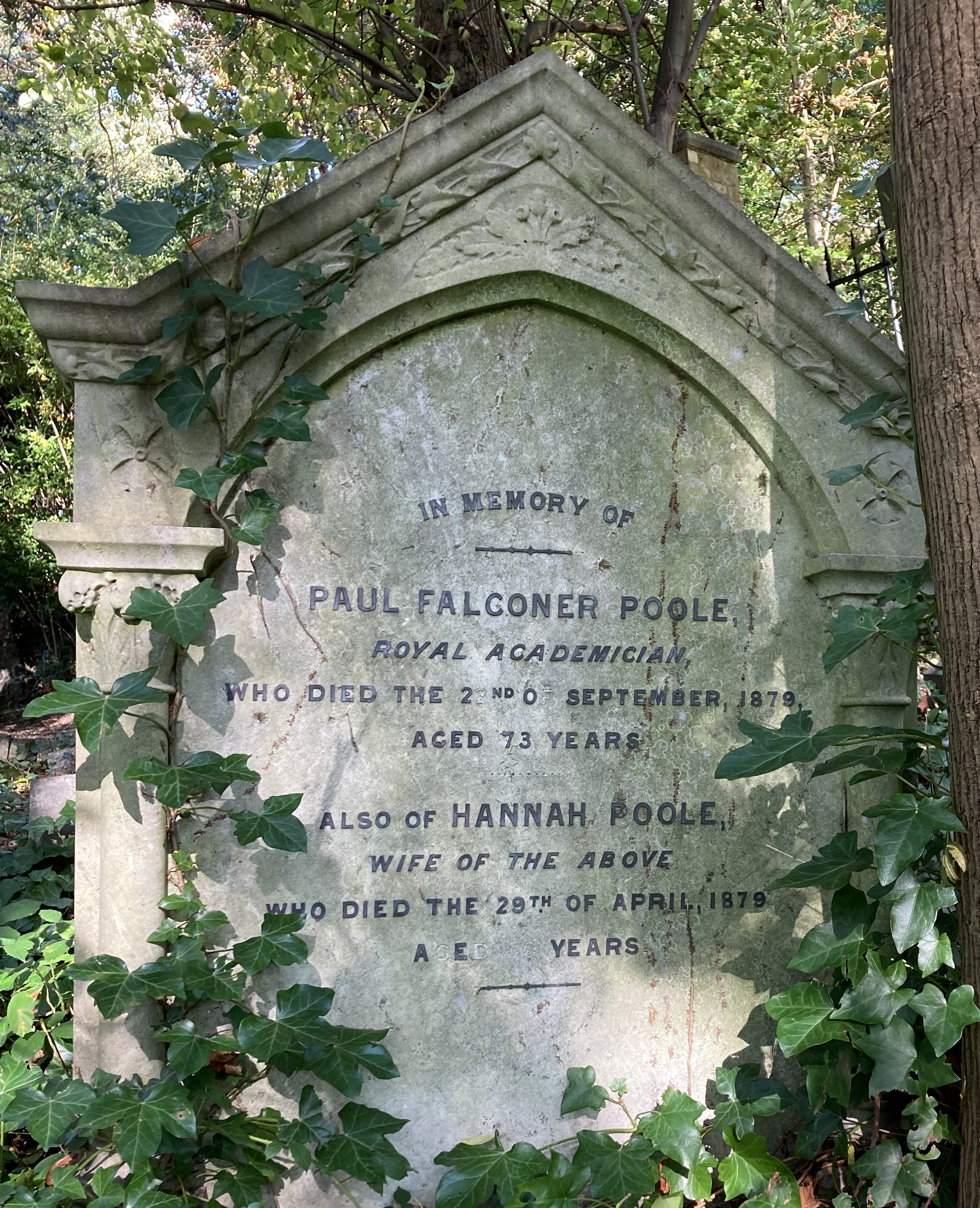
Grave of Paul Falconer Poole in Highgate Cemetery

Poole died on 22 September 1879 and was buried on the eastern side of Highgate Cemetery.

== Gallery ==
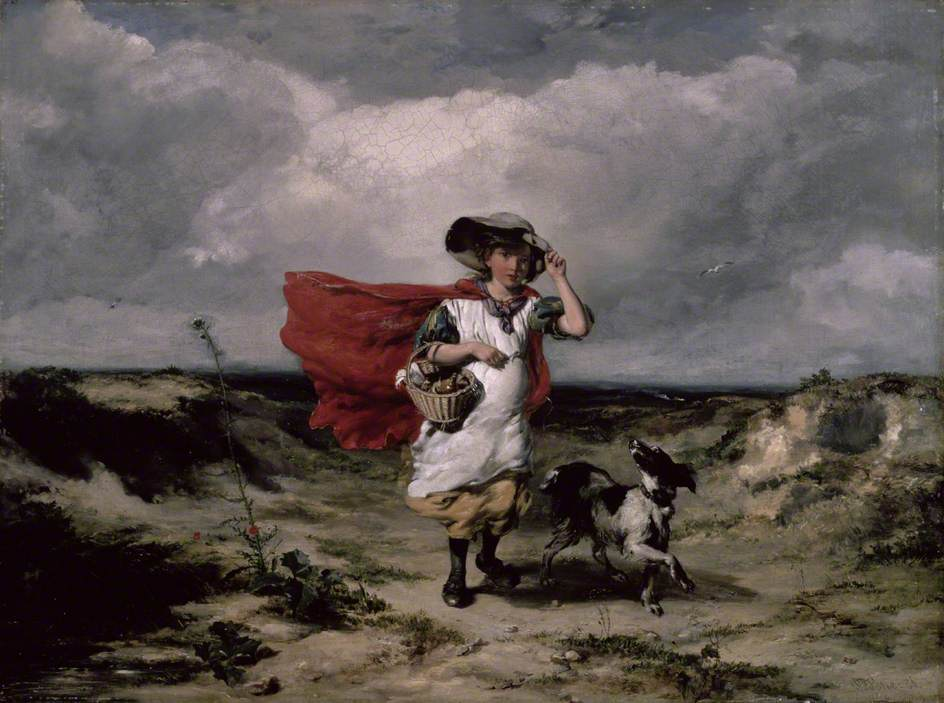
Crossing the Heath, Windy Day, 1836

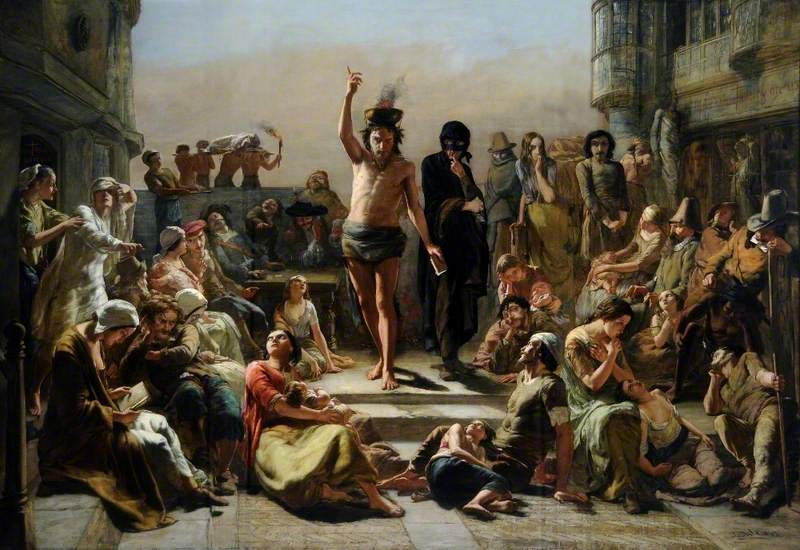
Solomon Eagle, 1843

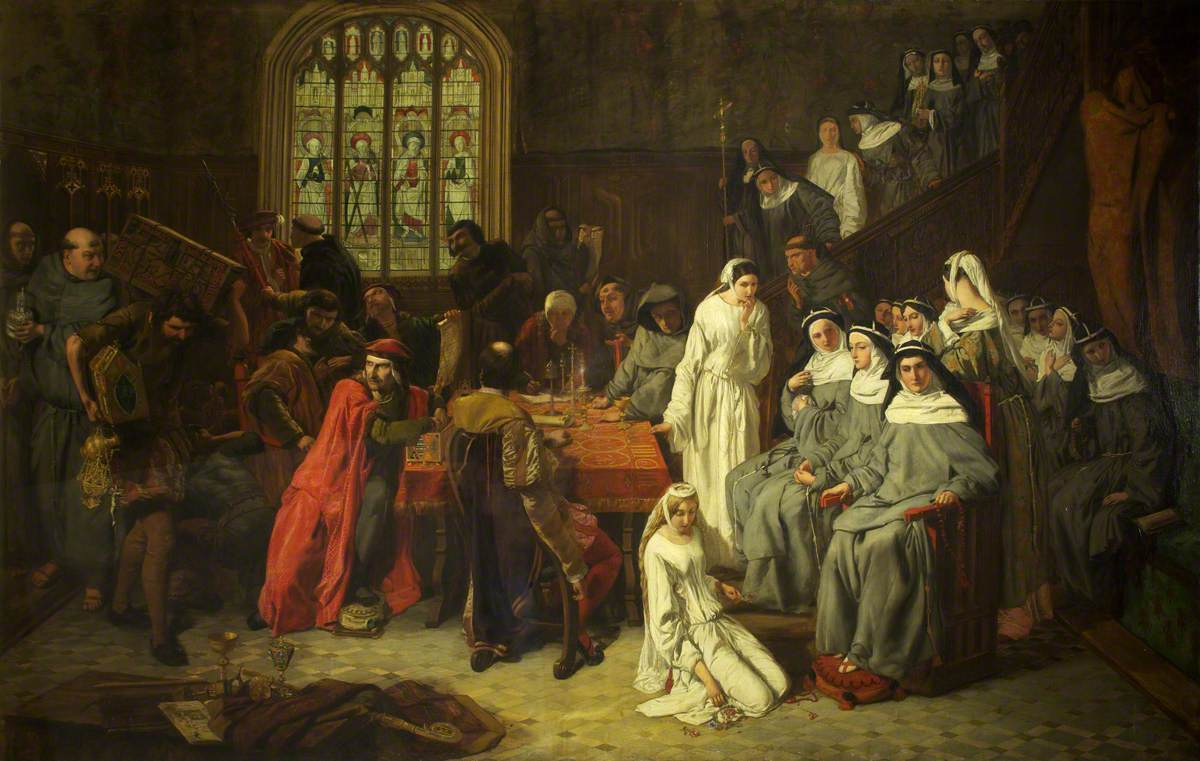
The Visitation and Surrender of Syon Nunnery, 1846

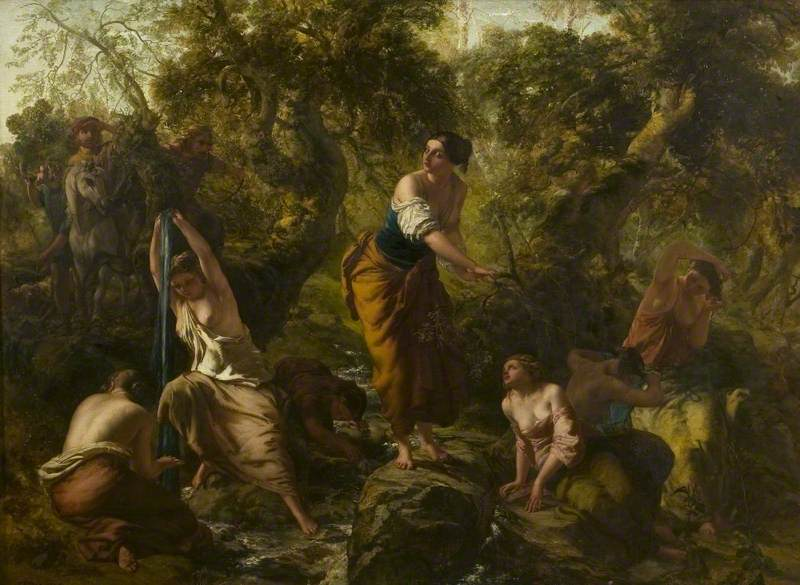
Arlète, a Peasant Girl of Falaise in Normandy, First Discovered by Duke Robert, 1848

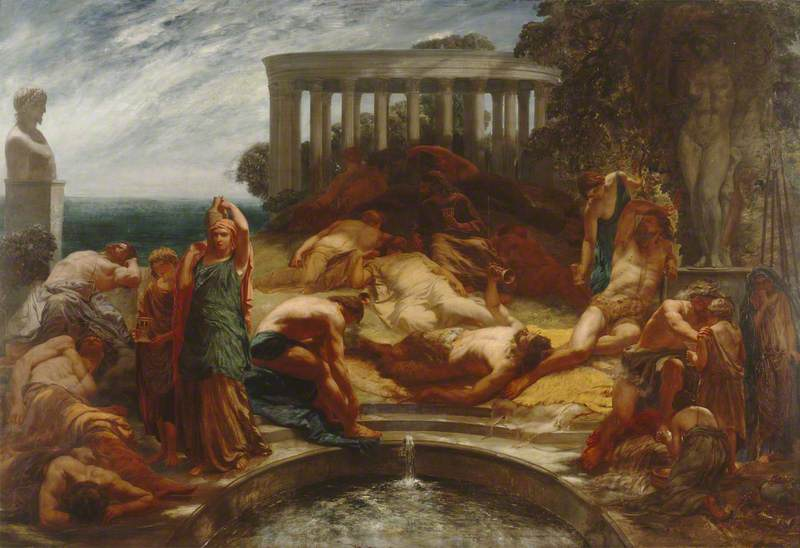
The Goths in Italy, 1851
