= The History of the Decline and Fall of the Roman Empire =

1776–1789 work of history by Edward Gibbon

- Title page from John Quincy Adams's copy of the third edition (1777)
- Author: Edward Gibbon
- Language: English
- Subject: History of the Roman Empire and fall of the Western Roman Empire
- Publisher: Strahan & Cadell, London
- Publication date: 1776–1789
- Publication place: England
- Media type: Print
- LC Class: DG311
- Text: The History of the Decline and Fall of the Roman Empire at Wikisource

The History of the Decline and Fall of the Roman Empire, sometimes shortened to Decline and Fall of the Roman Empire, is a six-volume work by the English historian Edward Gibbon. The six volumes cover, from 98 to 1590, the peak of the Roman Empire, the history of early Christianity and its emergence as the Roman state religion, the fall of the Western Roman Empire, the rise of Genghis Khan and Tamerlane and the fall of Byzantium, as well as discussions on the ruins of Ancient Rome.

Volume I was first published in February 1776 by William Strahan and Thomas Cadell. It was reissued in a succession of six revised editions between 1776 and 1789. Volumes II and III appeared in 1781, and the final three volumes (IV–VI) were issued together in 1788. All six volumes of the first edition were published in quarto; later octavo reprints followed from 1783 onward.

== Conception and writing ==
Gibbon's initial plan was to write a history "of the decline and fall of the city of Rome", and only later expanded his scope to the whole Roman Empire.

Although he published other books, Gibbon devoted much of his life to this one work. His 1796 autobiography Memoirs of My Life and Writings is devoted largely to his reflections on how the book virtually became his life. He compared the publication of each succeeding volume to a newborn child.

As for sources more recent than the ancients, Gibbon drew on Montesquieu's Considerations on the Causes of the Greatness of the Romans and their Decline (1734), Voltaire's Essay on Universal History (1756), and Bossuet's Discourse on Universal History (1681).

== Thesis ==
Gibbon offers an explanation for the fall of the Roman Empire, a task made difficult by a lack of comprehensive written sources.

According to Gibbon, the Roman Empire succumbed to barbarian invasions in large part due to the gradual loss of civic virtue among its citizens. He began an ongoing controversy about the role of Christianity, but he gave great weight to other causes of internal decline and to attacks from outside the Empire.

Like other Enlightenment thinkers and British citizens of the age steeped in institutional anti-Catholicism, Gibbon held in contempt the Middle Ages as a priest-ridden, superstitious Dark Age. It was not until his own era, the "Age of Reason", with its emphasis on rational thought, he believed, that human history could resume its progress.

== Style ==
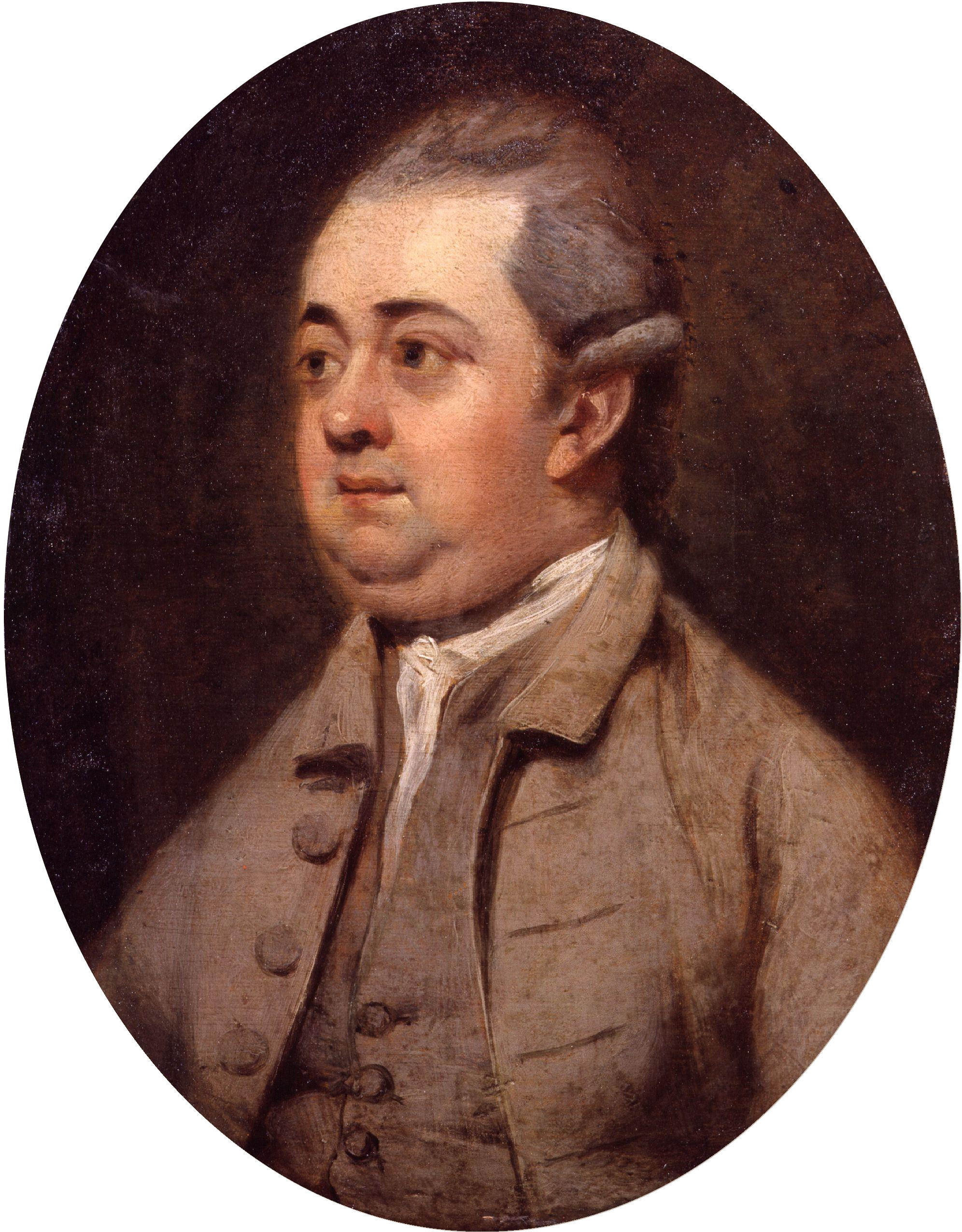
Edward Gibbon (1737–1794)

Gibbon's tone was detached, dispassionate, and yet critical. He was noted as occasionally lapsing into moralisation and aphorism.

== Editions ==
Gibbon continued to revise and change his work even after publication. The complexities of the problem are addressed in Womersley's introduction and appendices to his complete edition.

- In-print complete editions
  - J. B. Bury, ed., seven volumes, 2 editions, London: Methuen, first edition: 1896–1900 and revised edition: 1909–1914, reprinted New York: AMS Press, 1974–1978. ISBN 0-404-02820-9.
  - J. B. Bury, ed., two volumes, fourth edition. New York: The Macmillan Company, 1914. Volume 1. Volume 2.
  - Hugh Trevor-Roper, ed., six volumes, New York: Everyman's Library, 1993–1994. The text, including Gibbon's notes, is from Bury but without his notes. ISBN 0-679-42308-7 (vols. 1–3); ISBN 0-679-43593-X (vols. 4–6).
  - David Womersley, ed., three volumes, hardback London: Allen Lane, 1994 and paperback New York: Penguin Books, 1994, revised ed. 2005. Includes the original index, and the Vindication (1779), which Gibbon wrote in response to attacks on his caustic portrayal of Christianity. The 2005 print includes minor revisions and a new chronology. ISBN 0-7139-9124-0 (3360 pages); ISBN 0-14-043393-7 (vol. 1, 1232 pages); ISBN 0-14-043394-5 (vol. 2, 1024 pages); ISBN 0-14-043395-3 (vol. 3, 1360 pages).
- In-print abridgements
  - David Womersley, abridged ed., one volume, New York: Penguin Books, 2000. Includes all footnotes and seventeen of the seventy-one chapters. ISBN 0-14-043764-9 (848 pages).
  - Hans-Friedrich Mueller, abridged ed., one volume, New York: Random House, 2003. Includes excerpts from all seventy-one chapters. It eliminates footnotes, geographic surveys, details of battle formations, long narratives of military campaigns, ethnographies and genealogies. Based on the Rev. H.H. [Dean] Milman's edition of 1845 (see also Gutenberg e-text edition); ISBN 0-375-75811-9, (trade paper, 1312 pages); ISBN 0-345-47884-3 (mass market paper, 1536 pages).
  - AMN, abridged ed., one volume abridgement, Woodland: Historical Reprints, 2019. It eliminates most footnotes, adds some annotations, and omits Milman's notes. ISBN 978-1-950330-46-1 (large 8 x 11.5 trade paper 402 pages).

== Criticism ==
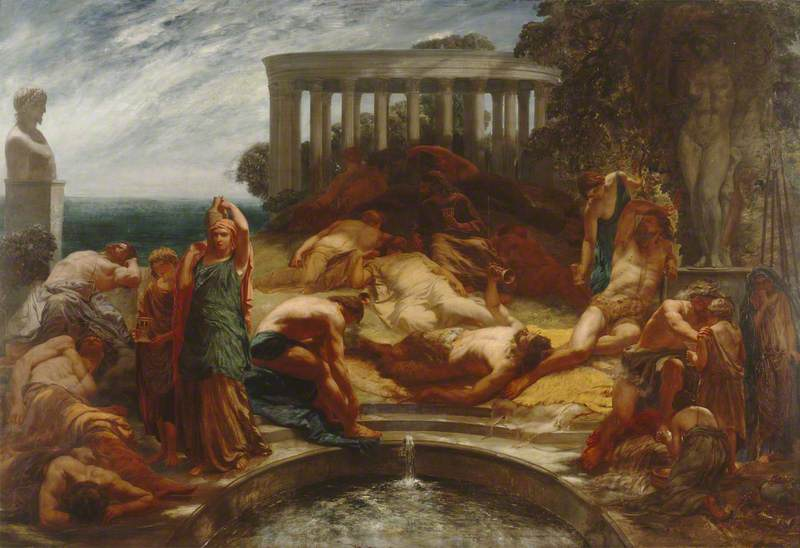
The Goths in Italy by Paul Falconer Poole, 1851

Numerous tracts were published criticising his work. In response, Gibbon defended his work with the 1779 publication of A Vindication of Some Passages in the Fifteenth and Sixteenth Chapters of the History of the Decline and Fall of the Roman Empire. Historian Hugh Trevor-Roper wrote: "The success of Gibbon's Vindication was immediate and complete. It had been one of the decisive battles of literary history."

Gibbon's central thesis in his explanation of how the Roman Empire fell, that it was due to embracing Christianity, is not widely accepted by scholars today. Gibbon argued that with the empire's new Christian character, large sums of wealth that would have otherwise been used in secular affairs in promoting the state were transferred to promoting the activities of the Church. However, the pre-Christian empire also spent large financial sums on religion and it is unclear whether or not the change of religion increased the amount of resources the empire spent on it. Gibbon further argued that new attitudes in Christianity caused many Christians of wealth to renounce their lifestyles and enter a monastic lifestyle, and so stop participating in the support of the empire. However, while many Christians of wealth did become monastics, this paled in comparison to the participants in the imperial bureaucracy. Although Gibbon further pointed out that the importance Christianity placed on peace caused a decline in the number of people serving the military, the decline was so small as to be negligible for the army's overall effectiveness.

John Julius Norwich, despite his admiration for Gibbon's furthering of historical methodology, considered his hostile views on the Byzantine Empire flawed, and blamed him somewhat for the lack of interest shown in the subject throughout the 19th and early 20th centuries. Gibbon prefaced subsequent editions to note that discussion of Byzantium was not his interest in writing the book. However, the Yugoslavian historian George Ostrogorsky wrote, "Gibbon and Lebeau were genuine historians – and Gibbon a very great one – and their works, in spite of factual inadequacy, rank high for their presentation of their material."

Gibbon challenged Church history by estimating far smaller numbers of Christian martyrs than had been traditionally accepted. The Church's version of its early history had rarely been questioned before. Gibbon, however, said that modern Church writings were secondary sources, and he shunned them in favour of primary sources.

Historian S. P. Foster says that Gibbon "blamed the otherworldly preoccupations of Christianity for the decline of the Roman empire, heaped scorn and abuse on the church, and sneered at the entirety of monasticism as a dreary, superstition-ridden enterprise."

Gibbon's work was originally published in sections, as was common for large works at the time. The first two volumes were well-received and widely praised, but with the publication of volume 3, Gibbon was attacked by some as a "paganist" because he argued that Christianity (or at least the abuse of it by some of the clergy and its followers) had hastened the fall of the Roman Empire. In this regard, Gibbon's attitudes were shaped by the contemporary anti-clericalism & secularisation of the Enlightenment-era.

Voltaire was deemed to have influenced Gibbon's claim that Christianity was a contributor to the fall of the Roman Empire.

Gibbon has been criticised for his portrayal of Paganism as tolerant and Christianity as intolerant.

In the beginning of 1800s, the book was a matter of controversy in the Kingdom of Brazil. The royal censor José da Silva Lisboa had it forbidden on the grounds of having dangerous ideas for the United Kingdom of Portugal, Brazil and the Algarves, but it was later permitted by the censor Francisco de Borja Garção Stockler on the grounds of being "one of the few products that are most admirable for the human spirit."

== Legacy ==
Many writers have used variations on the series title (including using "Rise and Fall" in place of "Decline and Fall"), especially when dealing with a large polity that has imperial characteristics. Notable examples include Jefferson Davis' The Rise and Fall of the Confederate Government, William Shirer's The Rise and Fall of the Third Reich, and David Bowie's music album The Rise and Fall of Ziggy Stardust and the Spiders from Mars.

The title and author have also been referenced in poems such as Noël Coward's "I Went to a Marvellous Party" ("If you have any mind at all, / Gibbon's divine Decline and Fall, / Seems pretty flimsy, / No more than a whimsy...") and Isaac Asimov's "The Foundation of S.F. Success", in which Asimov admits his Foundation series (about the fall and rebuilding of a galactic empire) was written "with a tiny bit of cribbin' / from the works of Edward Gibbon".

Piers Brendon, who wrote The Decline and Fall of the British Empire, 1781–1997, claimed that Gibbon's work "became the essential guide for Britons anxious to plot their own imperial trajectory. They found the key to understanding the British Empire in the ruins of Rome".

In 1995, an established journal of classical scholarship, Classics Ireland, published punk musician Iggy Pop's reflections on the applicability of The Decline and Fall of the Roman Empire to the modern world in a short article, Caesar Lives, (vol. 2, 1995) in which he asserted:

America is Rome. Of course, why shouldn't it be? We are all Roman children, for better or worse ... I learn much about the way our society really works, because the system-origins – military, religious, political, colonial, agricultural, financial – are all there to be scrutinised in their infancy. I have gained perspective.

The work features in "My Old Kentucky Home", the third episode of the third season of Mad Men (2009). Sally Draper reads aloud from the book to her grandfather Eugene Hofstadt each night, stumbling on the word "licentiousness", while Gene responds to the passages with the warning, "Just wait. All hell's gonna break loose". The book recurs in the following episode, "The Arrangements", in which Sally falls asleep clutching Gene's copy after his death.

== See also ==
- Fall of the Western Roman Empire
