= Laking (disambiguation) =

Laking or hemolysis is the rupturing of red blood cells.

Laking may also refer to:

- Laking baronets

== People with the surname ==
- Charles Laking
- Francis Laking
- George Laking
- Guy Francis Laking
- Janice Laking
- Joy Laking (born 1950), Canadian artist
- Ted Laking

== See also ==
- Lake (disambiguation)
- Lake King, Western Australia
