= Branwhite =

Branwhite is a surname. Notable people with the surname include:

- Charles Branwhite (1817–1880), English landscape painter
- Nathan Cooper Branwhite (c. 1775–1857), English miniature portrait painter, watercolorist, and engraver
- Peregrine Branwhite (1745–c. 1795), English poet
