= Cradle of Henry V =

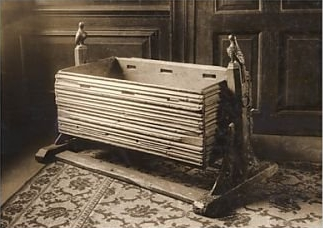
- The cradle of Henry V photographed by William Edward Gray when it was loaned to the London Museum in 1912
- Material: Oak
- Present location: Royal Collection

The so-called cradle of Henry V, now in the British Royal Collection, is, according to tradition, the cradle in which the newborn Henry of Monmouth, later to be King Henry V of England, was placed. The cradle, for many years in the Rectory in Newland, Gloucestershire, was bought at auction in 1908 by King Edward VII, and was later loaned to the London Museum by George V. The cradle was on display in the London Museum and its successor the Museum of London until 2005, when it was returned to the Royal Collection. It is now believed to date from a century later than the time of Henry V, but is still considered to be a unique example of a medieval cradle made for a baby of noble birth.

== Description ==
The cradle is 120 cm (46 inches) long and 86 cm (34 inches) high overall. It is made of oak, and consists of two parts, a deep box-like crib in which the baby was placed and a stand on which the crib swings from iron hooks. The crib is made of planks with a series of deep horizontal mouldings on the exterior. Horizontal slots in the top of the side panels were probably intended to hold bands that crossed from one side to the other to secure the baby. The stand consists of two inverted T-shaped supports with triangular decorated buttresses, and is decorated with carved figures of two heraldic birds watching over the suspended crib. It is now believed to date from the late 15th century, and is a unique example of a medieval cradle made for a baby of noble birth.

== History ==
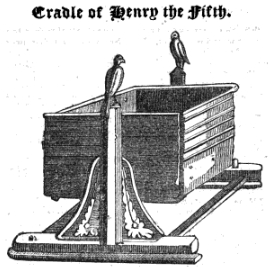
The "Cradle of Henry V" as illustrated in Mirror of Literature (1825)

The cradle is first recorded in 1773, when it was in the possession of the Revd Peregrine Ball, at the Rectory in Newland, Gloucestershire. It was already reputed to have been the cradle of the baby Henry of Monmouth, who was to become King Henry V of England. Henry was born at Monmouth Castle on 16 September 1386, the son of Mary de Bohun and Henry Bolingbroke, and the grandson of John of Gaunt. It was said that as a baby Henry had been put out to nurse at Courtfield, a manor house at Welsh Bicknor, not far from Newland, where an ancestor of the Revd Ball had been a "rocker" to the noble baby and had received the cradle as a perquisite.

The cradle was famous locally and was often shown to visitors. Its claim to be a genuine relic of Henry V's childhood was generally accepted.

On the death of the Revd Ball, his son presented the cradle to a Mr Whitehead of Hambrook, Frenchay, near Bristol. In 1839 it was in the possession of the antiquarian George Weare Braikenridge, of Brislington, Bristol, who was reported to have bought it for £30.

Through confusion with another cradle, this cradle was later said to be at Troy House in Mitchel Troy, Monmouthshire, together with the armour that Henry V wore at Agincourt.

Braikenridge's collection was auctioned at Christie's in London in 1908, and the cradle was bought for 230 guineas by Guy Laking, Keeper of the King's Armoury to King Edward VII, bidding on behalf of the King himself. The cradle then went to Windsor Castle and remained there for four years. In 1912 the London Museum was established at Kensington Palace under Guy Laking's direction, and the cradle was loaned to the museum by Edward VII's successor, King George V. The cradle was on display in the London Museum and its successor the Museum of London until 2005, when it was returned to the Royal Collection.
