= Joseph Röckel =

Joseph Röckel may refer to:

- Joseph August Röckel, German operatic tenor and opera producer
- Joseph Leopold Röckel, composer and music teacher
