= Samuel Phillips Jackson =

English watercolour painter (1830–1904)

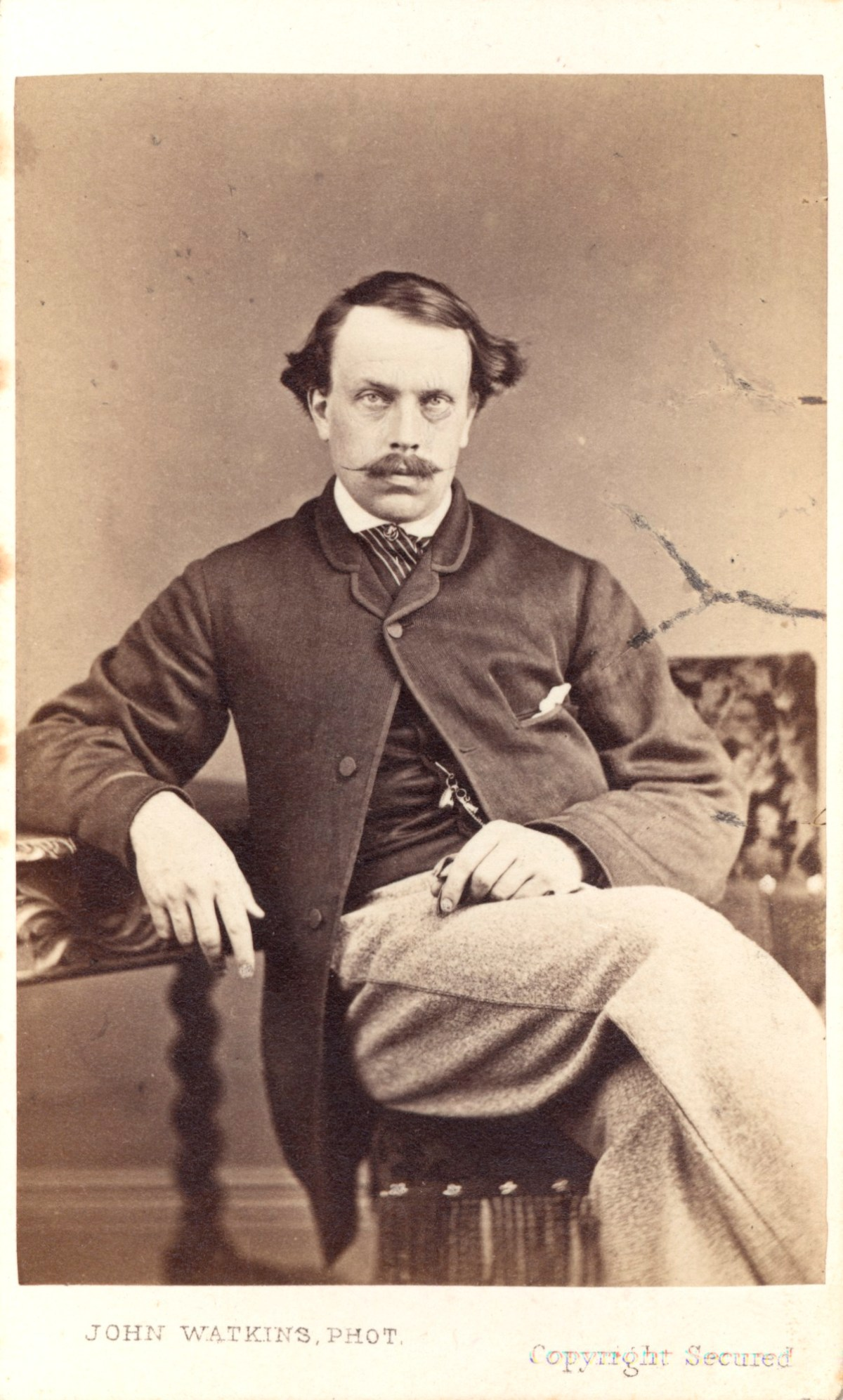
Photographic portrait by John Watkins (c. 1850–1880)

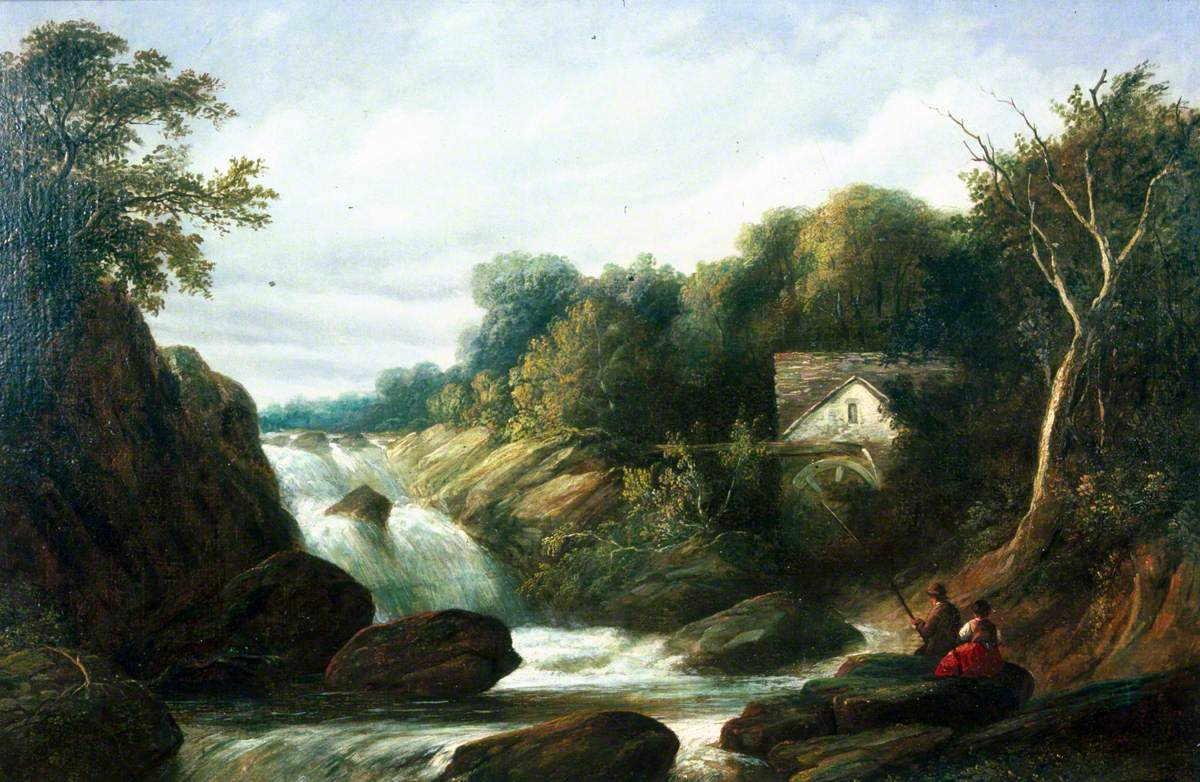
Mill (1883)

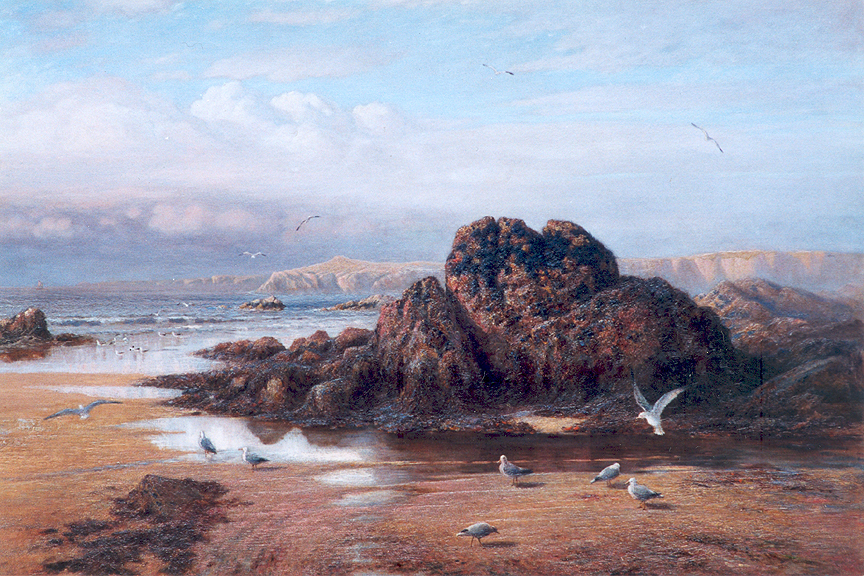
West Cornwall Bay (1889)

Samuel Phillips Jackson, RWS (1830–1904) was an English water-colour painter. He specialised in landscape and marine painting.

== Life ==
Samuel Phillips Jackson, born at Bristol on 4 September 1830, was the only son of four children of Samuel Jackson, landscape-painter, by his wife Jane Phillips. His sister Jane Roeckel was a composer; his sister Ada Villiers was also a musician. He received early instruction in art from his father at Bristol, and studied figure drawing at the life school of the academy there. Among his early Bristol friends were James Francis Danby and Charles Branwhite.

He soon directed his attention mainly to land- and sea-scape, and first exhibited in London at the age of twenty. In 1851 his Dismasted Ship off the Welsh Coast was shown at the British Institution, where between that year and 1857 he exhibited nine pictures. He first exhibited at the Royal Academy in 1852, and from that year to 1881 sent eight paintings and eight drawings. On 14 February 1853 he was made associate of the Royal Water Colour Society, and henceforth confined himself to water colours, sending the maximum number of pictures (eight a year) to each summer exhibition of the society until 1876, when he was elected full member. By 1881 he had sent some 500 works to the winter and summer exhibitions.

His earlier works, mainly in oils, showed a preference for Devon and Cornish coast scenes, and many of them won the praise of Ruskin. His Coast of North Devon (British Institute) was bought by Mr. Bicknell. The more important were A Roadstead after a Gale, Twilight (Royal Academy 1852), Towing a Disabled Vessel (Royal Academy 1852), Hazy Morning on the Coast of Devon (1853), (the two latter afterwards entered the Victoria and Albert Museum, South Kensington), A Summer Day on the Coast (1855), The Breakwater and Chapel Rock, Bude, and The Sands at Bude (1856), Dartmouth Harbour (1858), On the Hamoaze, Plymouth (1858, afterwards at South Kensington), Styhead Tarn, Cumberland (1858), and A Dead Calm far at sea (1858). A tour in Switzerland in 1858 with his father produced his Lake of Thun — Evening, exhibited in 1859. Other sea-scapes followed: Bamborough in 1850, Whitby Pier in a Gale in 1863, and St. Ives' Pier in 1864.

In 1856 he removed to Streatley-on-Thames, Reading, and subsequently to Henley-on-Thames. Thenceforward he chiefly devoted himself to views of the Thames. The Thames at Wargrave, Mid-day (afterwards at South Kensington) is dated 1866, and The Thames from Streatley Bridge 1868.

Jackson had other than artistic interests. He was keenly interested in photography, and invented an instantaneous shutter for which he gained a medal from the Royal Photographic Society. He moved in later life to Bristol and died unmarried at his residence there, 62 Clifton Park Road, on 27 January 1904.

== Appraisal ==
According to William Benjamin Owen, Jackson's strength lay in firm and careful execution, and in restrained harmonies of tone and colour. In such early work as his Hazy Morning on the Coast of Devon he favoured restful sunlight effects. His handling of grey mist and clouds always skilfully interpreted the placid West Country atmosphere.
