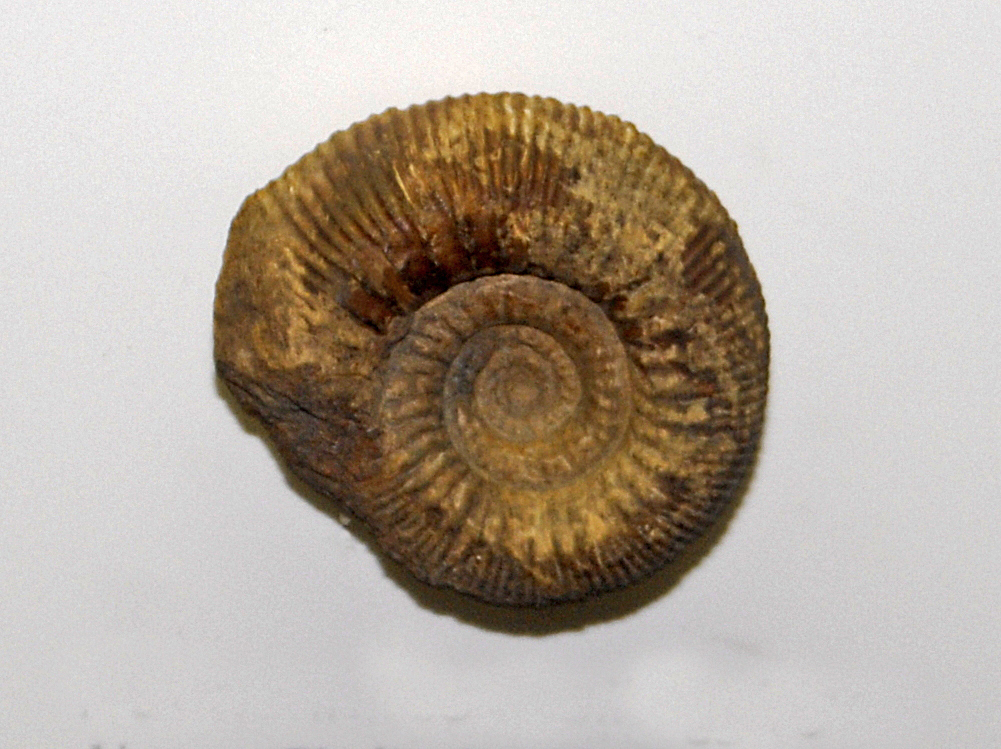
- Fossil specimen of Normannites braikenridgei from Mid Jurassic - Germany

Scientific classification
- Kingdom: Animalia
- Phylum: Mollusca
- Class: Cephalopoda
- Subclass: †Ammonoidea
- Order: †Ammonitida
- Family: †Stephanoceratidae
- Genus: †Normannites; Munier-Chalmas, 1892

= Normannites =

Normannites Temporal range: Bajocian

Normannites is a strongly ribbed evolute Middle Jurassic genus of ammonite included in the stephanoceratoid family Stephanoceratidae.

Normanites was previously included in the Otoitidae by Arkell et al. 1957. More recent classifications show it to belong to the family Stephanoceratidae, along with genera like Stephanoceras and Stemmatoceras.

== Description ==
Normannites has shells reaching a diameter of 52–55 millimetres (2.0–2.2 in). These shells have large lappets, curved plate-like structures that project forward on either side of the aperture. Primary ribs on the inner side of each whorl are large and close spaced, bifurcate about mid flank before continuing over the venter. Secondary ribs, when present, appear about mid flank between primary pairs.

Stephanoceras differs in its tendency to develop tubercles at the point of furcation in the primary ribs. Primary ribs, low on the whorls, in Stemmatoceras tend to be narrower and sharper.

== Selected species ==
- Normannites braikenridgei † (Sowerby 1852) - The Latin name of this species honors George Weare Braikenridge (1775 - 1856), an English antiquarian and collector of fossils.
- Normannites boulderensis † Imlay 1982

== Distribution ==
Jurassic of Saudi Arabia
