= Francis Laking =

English physician

Sir Francis Laking Bt GCVO KCB
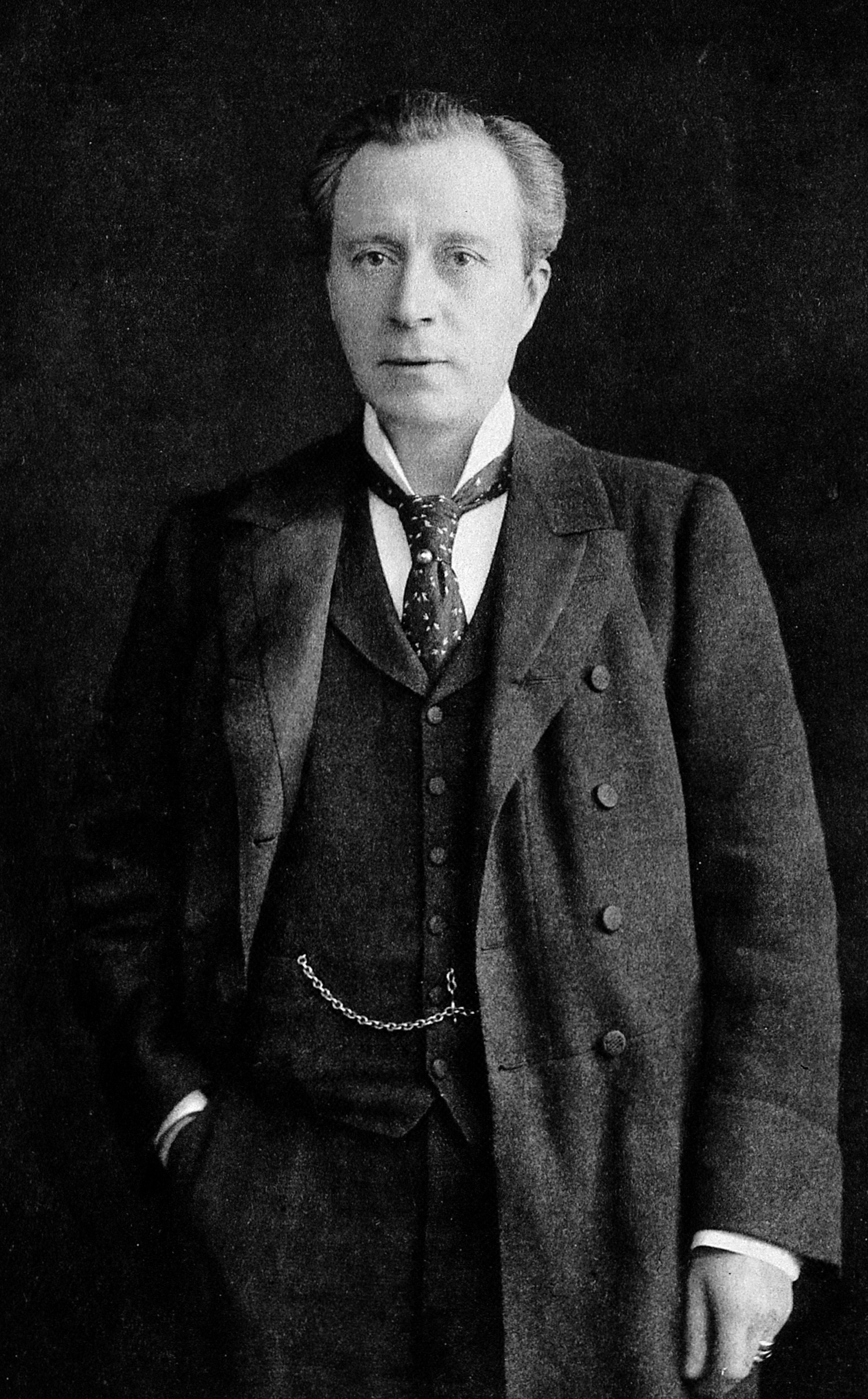
- Born: 9 January 1847; Kensington, London, England
- Died: 21 May 1914 (aged 67); Cleveland Row, St. James’s, London, England
- Education: St. George’s Hospital; Heidelberg
- Years active: 1870–1914
- Known for: Physician to the Royal Household
- Spouse(s): Emma Ann Mansell (1873/1875–1905) ? Hackworth, no issue.
- Children: Sir Guy Francis Laking, 2nd Baronet
- Medical career
- Profession: Physician
- Institutions: St. George’s Hospital; Victoria Hospital for Children, Chelsea
- Research: all

Sir Francis Henry Laking, 1st Baronet, GCVO, KCB (9 January 1847 – 21 May 1914) was an English physician who was Surgeon-Apothecary in Ordinary to Queen Victoria, and Physician-in-Ordinary to King Edward VII and King George V.

== Life ==
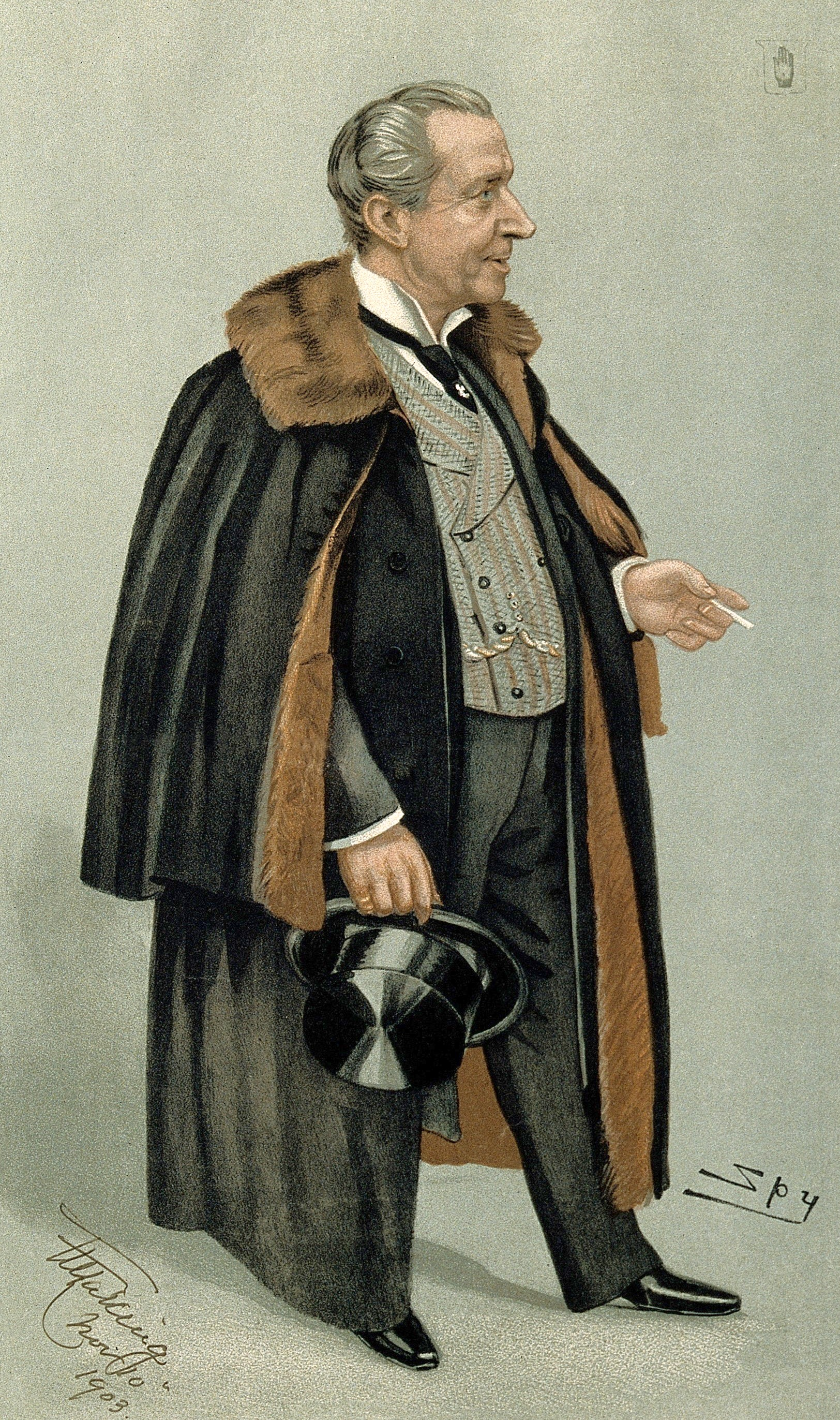
Laking as caricatured by Spy (Leslie Ward) in Vanity Fair, February 1903

He was educated firstly at St George's Hospital taking diploma of L.R.C.P. in 1868, afterwards at Heidelberg taking L.S.A. as well as the degree of M.D. in 1869. He was house-physician at St. George’s Hospital in 1870, medical registrar from 1871 to 1874, and was at one time assistant physician to the Victoria Hospital for Children, Chelsea. Soon after leaving St. George’s he entered into partnership with M. Du Pasquier, Apothecary to the Royal Household, and his connection with the Court in various capacities of ever-increasing distinction continued until his death. He became Surgeon-Apothecary-in-Ordinary to Queen Victoria, Apothecary-in-Ordinary to the Royal Household, and to the household of the Prince of Wales, the Duke of Edinburgh, and the Duke of Connaught, an office which he retained under King Edward VII and King George V.

On 29 March 1901, after the accession of King Edward VII, he was appointed one of three Physicians in Ordinary, together with Sir William Henry Broadbent, Bt, and Sir James Reid, Bt. But even before the new King could be crowned Laking was the royal physician. He diagnosed appendicitis in March 1901 urging the King seek advice and elective surgery from Sir Frederick Treves, the royal surgeon. The correct decisions were taken and an ailing monarch's life was saved by Laking's presence of mind.

=== Family ===
Francis Henry Laking, born 9 January 1847, was the son of Francis William Laking (Middlesex, ca.1797 –25 November 1874), of Addison Road, Kensington, Middlesex, and (m. 12 October 1844) Louisa Jane Wilkinson (Devon, ca. 1818 – 17 March 1894), a daughter of Thomas Wilkinson, of Plymouth.

On 26 January 1873/1875, Laking married Emma Ann Mansell (St Pancras, London, Middlesex, ca.1843/1844 –Pall Mall, London, Westminster, 1 March 1905), daughter of Joseph Mansell (Clerkenwell, Middlesex, ca. 1803 –living 1871), stationer, and wife Elizabeth ... (Poplar, London, Middlesex, ca.1821 –living 1871). Their only son was Sir Guy Francis Laking, 2nd Baronet (Westminster, 21 October 1875 – Meyrick Lodge, Avenue Road, London, 22 November 1919), who succeeded to the baronetcy, upon the death of his father, on 21 May 1914. He married secondly the daughter of the late Mr. James Hackworth, of Dunedin, by whom he was survived and, by whom he had no children.

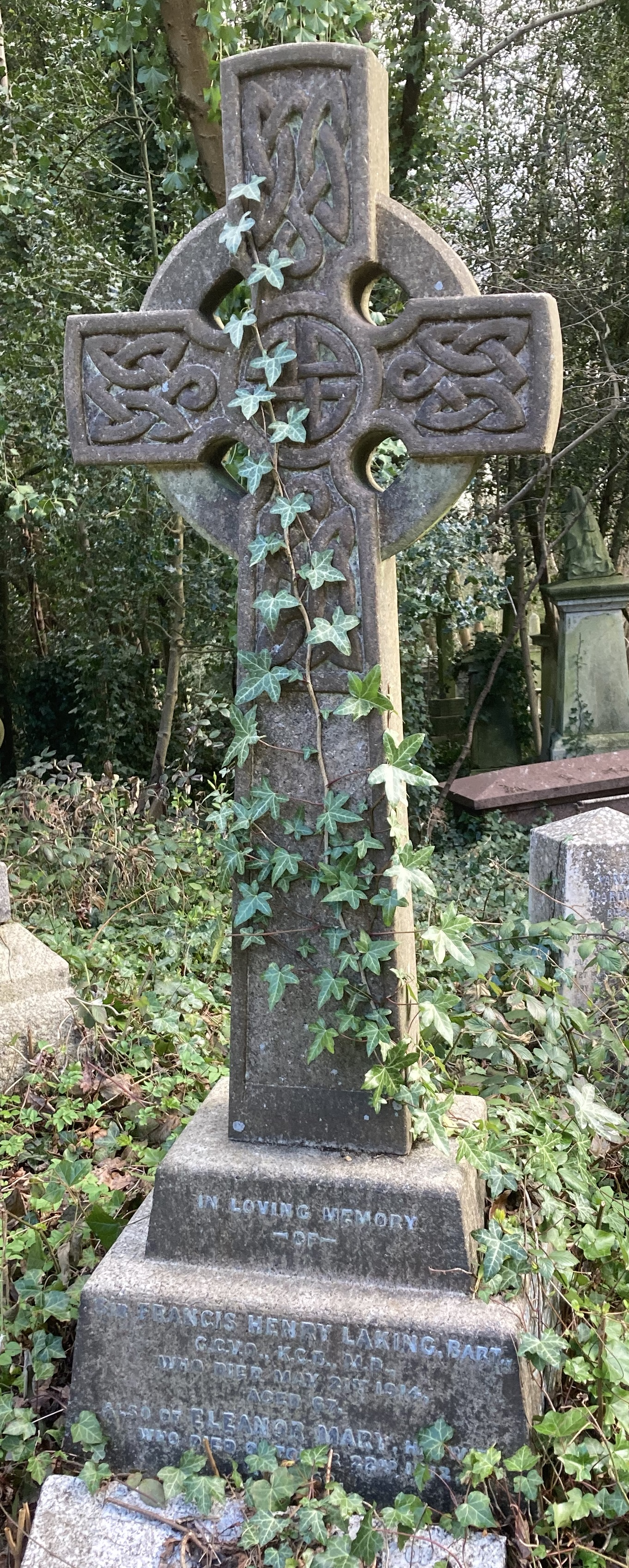
Grave of Sir Francis Henry Laking at Highgate Cemetery (west side)

Sir Francis died at his residence at Cleveland Row, St. James's, London on 21 May 1914. The funeral took place on 25 May 1914 at Queen's Chapel following which he was interred at Highgate Cemetery.

=== Honours ===
He was knighted in 1893. It was announced that he would receive a baronetcy in the 1902 Coronation Honours list published on 26 June 1902 for the (subsequently postponed) coronation of King Edward VII, and on 24 July 1902 he was created a Baronet, of Kensington, in the parish of St Mary Abbots, in the Royal borough of Kensington, in the county of London. After the actual coronation had taken place the following month, he was appointed a Knight Grand Cross of the Royal Victorian Order (GCVO) on 11 August 1902. Shortly after the death of King Edward VII, he was appointed a Knight Commander of the Order of the Bath on 3 June 1910.

In addition he held foreign orders from the crowns of Denmark, Turkey, Italy, Portugal, Sweden, Norway and Greece, and was also a Commander of the Légion d'honneur.

== Recent controversy ==
In 2004, Norwegian biographer Tor Bomann-Larsen put forward the hypothesis that King Olav V of Norway was not the biological son of King Haakon VII, but his mother, Queen Maud, had been, in 1902 in London, artificially inseminated by Sir Francis Laking:

In October 2004, in the second Volume of Folket, his history of King Haakon VII and Queen Maud, the author Tor Bomann-Larsen presents evidence that in October 1902 Princess Maud ever stayed (secretly) in a London Hospital under the care of Sir Francis Henry Laking, 1st Baronet, physician-in-ordinary and surgeon-apothecary to King Edward VII of the United Kingdom (Princess Maud's father), and that during this secret hospital stay, Sir Francis artificially inseminated Princess Maud, who gave birth to Prince Alexander (the future King Olav V) some nine months later. Mr. Bomann-Larsen further implies, but does not directly state, that the sperm donor was Sir Francis's son, Guy Francis Laking.

In March 2005, Odd Arvid Storsveen, a Historian at the University of Oslo, published a review of Mr. Bomann-Larsen's book in Historisk Tidsskrift. In this review, Mr. Storsveen claims he can't find adequate sourcing for Mr.Bomann-Larsen's "hypothesis" about King Olav V's paternity.

=== In popular culture ===
At a press junket in 2010, MMA fighter Muhammed "King Mo" Lawal referenced Laking, shouting to reporters "I am the greatest, most influential figure in history... John Witherspoon, Francis Laking, they ain't got nothin' on me!" The obscure reference was met with stunned silence.

Baronetage of the United Kingdom
New creation	Baronet (of Kensington); 1902–1914	Succeeded by Guy Francis Laking
