= Troy House =

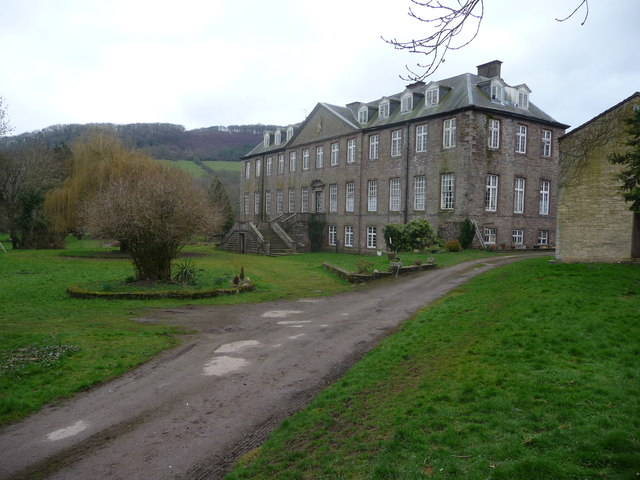

- Location within Monmouthshire
- 51.7987°N 2.7129°W
- Type: House
- Location: Mitchel Troy, Monmouthshire, Wales

History
- Built: C17th

Site notes
- Governing body: Privately owned

Listed Building – Grade II*
- Official name: Troy House
- Designated: 1 May 1952
- Reference no.: 2060

Listed Building – Grade II*
- Official name: Walled Garden to west of Troy House
- Designated: 29 March 1993
- Reference no.: 2866

Listed Building – Grade II
- Official name: Troy Cottage
- Designated: 10 October 1974
- Reference no.: 2734

Listed Building – Grade II
- Official name: Gateway and gates to Troy House
- Designated: 27 November 2001
- Reference no.: 25791

Cadw/ICOMOS Register of Parks and Gardens of Special Historic Interest in Wales
- Official name: Troy House Park
- Designated: 1 February 2022
- Reference no.: PGW(Gt)16(Mon)
- Listing: Grade II*

Troy House is a Welsh historic house, on a "ducal" scale, north-east of Mitchel Troy, Monmouthshire. The original house belonged to Blanche Herbert, Lady Troy, of the Herbert family of Raglan Castle, who owned great estates in South Wales as Marquesses of Worcester and later Dukes of Beaufort. The present structure, overlooking the River Trothy was constructed from 1681 to 1684 as a wedding present for Charles Somerset by his father, Henry Somerset, 1st Duke of Beaufort. Troy House is a Grade II* listed building and its gardens and park are listed, also at Grade II*, on the Cadw/ICOMOS Register of Parks and Gardens of Special Historic Interest in Wales.

== History ==
In 1667 Henry Somerset succeeded his father to the title of Marquess of Worcester. Henry, a staunch supporter of Charles II, restored the family fortunes and built a series of residences to replace the slighted Raglan Castle. He started with Great Castle House, in Monmouth in 1673, continued with Badminton House in Gloucestershire, and built the new Troy House as a wedding gift to his son Charles. In Monmouth Museum there is a painting by Hendrick Danckerts, dated circa 1672, which shows Troy House in a panorama of Monmouth.

In 1682 Charles Somerset married Rebecca Child and acquired the title of Marquess of Worcester. Between 1682 and 1699 he expanded Troy House and rebuilt the facade in neoclassical style. The house remained the property of the Somersets until the death of Henry Somerset, 8th Duke of Beaufort in 1899. At this time, the family consolidated its estates around Badminton House in Gloucestershire and the descendants of the 8th Duke auctioned off the 1,670-acre (680 ha) Troy estate along with most of their Welsh properties. In 1872, a gazetteer reported that the cradle belonging to Henry V together with the alleged armour Henry V wore at Agincourt were said to be at "the mansion" in Mitchel Troy. (Note: The authors of the 1863 edition of Bradshaw's Guide exhibited scepticism regarding the authenticity of Troy's treasures writing, "Here is Henry's cradle (so called) and the armour he wore at Agincourt".)

Troy House was purchased by the Good Shepherd Sisters in 1904 and converted to a convent school. The nuns expanded the estate buildings with a chapel, a hostel and service buildings. In 1935 the institution was converted into an approved school with state financing. The building gradually deteriorated, and in the 1980s the school moved out and the building was closed. A subsequent plan by the Unification movement to purchase the property did not succeed.

In 2009, proposals were put forward by a property developer to divide the house into residential units. The proposed enabling development would involve the construction of two new wings which were intended to accommodate more units than would be possible in the original house. Conservationists were divided over the proposals: Save Britain's Heritage concurred with the developer's analysis, others, including the Georgian Group expressed fears that the plans would constitute significant overdevelopment of the house and site. In 2015 Monmouthshire County Council funded a protected species survey required for consideration of the redevelopment proposals. As of 2017, the house remained empty, except for a caretaker. In June 2019, revised plans for the conversion of the house to flats, with two new blocks of flats as enabling development, which had been approved by the County Council in 2018, were rejected by the Welsh Government. The reason given was that the location of the property in a flood zone made it "highly vulnerable".

According to a June 2019 newsreport, the property had been owned by Peter Carroll of Chepstow since the 1970s. In May 2020, the property was put up for auction, with a guide price between £200,000 and £250,000 but was described as "an almost total wreck" by Country Life magazine, confirmed by photographs of the interior. Despite its condition, Troy House sold for just over £1.35m.

== Architecture and description ==
The house is very large, "three bays deep but no less than thirteen bays wide", in a style that was very modern for the date of design, "a hipped roof over a regularly fenestrated block." The architectural historian John Newman notes its "ducal scale". Some 19th-century authors wrongly attributed the design of the house to Inigo Jones. However the Monmouth antiquarian Charles Heath doubted the attribution in 1804, writing, "The house is said to have been built by Inigo Jones but I do not think the report well founded". The historian William Coxe, writing in his An Historical Tour In Monmouthshire in 1801, was also sceptical; "It does not reflect much credit on the taste of that eminent architect, having a long, straggling front, and being built in so low a situation as to exclude all prospect from the habitable apartments."

Local historian Keith Kissack described the house as "not very impressive externally" but the interior contains "three good-quality, typically Jacobean decorated ceilings." John B. Hilling, in his study The Architecture of Wales: From the first to the twenty-first century, describes Troy as "austere and bleak". The building once contained much wood panelling from Raglan Castle but this was subsequently removed to Badminton House. Troy is a Grade II* listed building. The walled garden has a separate Grade II* listing. A barn in the adjacent courtyard, and the lodge and gates at the head of the drive all have their own Grade II designations. The gardens and grounds have their own Grade II* listing on the Cadw/ICOMOS Register of Parks and Gardens of Special Historic Interest in Wales.

== Monmouth Troy House station ==
In 1857 the Coleford, Monmouth, Usk and Pontypool Railway built a railway station north of Troy House. It was inaugurated as Monmouth Troy House station, but the name was soon reduced to Monmouth Troy. It was closed to passenger traffic in 1959 and completely shut down in 1964. In 1985 the brick station building was carefully disassembled and in 1987-1999 rebuilt on the site of Winchcombe railway station of the heritage Gloucestershire Warwickshire Railway.

== Gallery ==
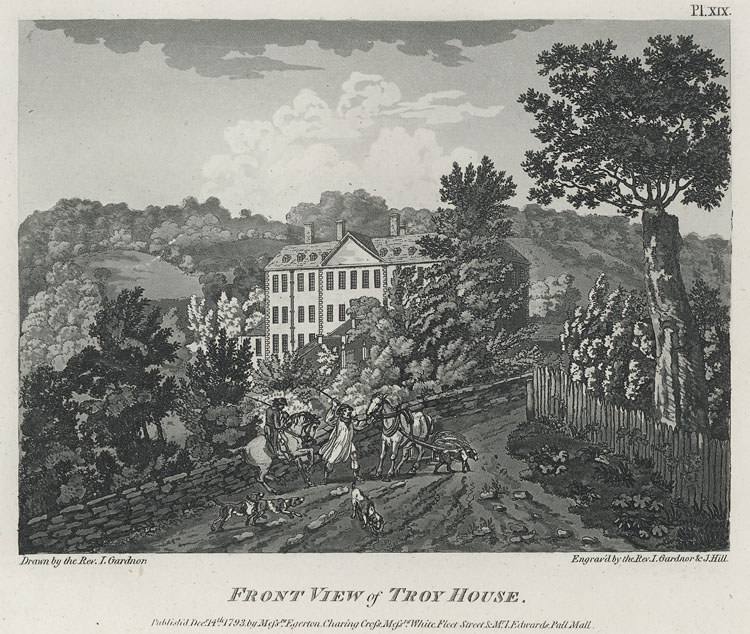
Front view of Troy House (1793)

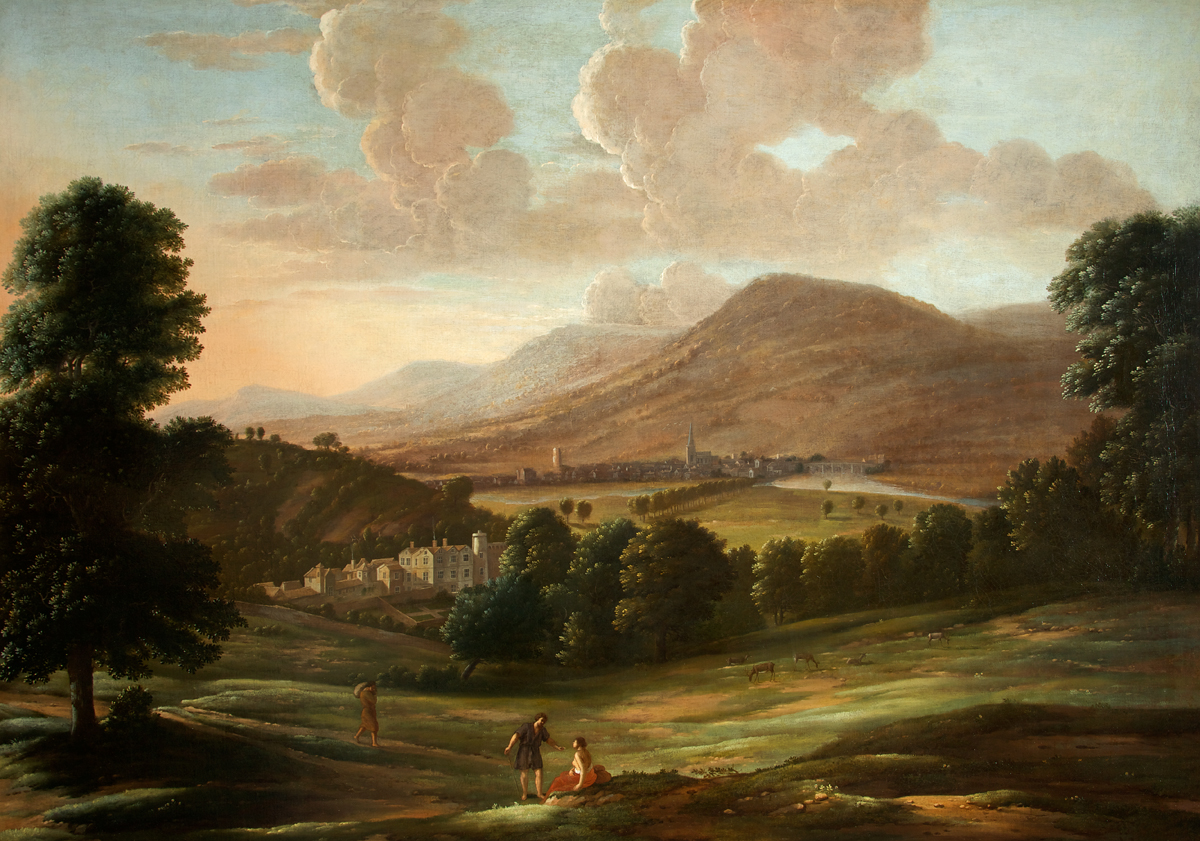
A view over Troy House towards Monmouth, c.1672 by Henry Danckerts

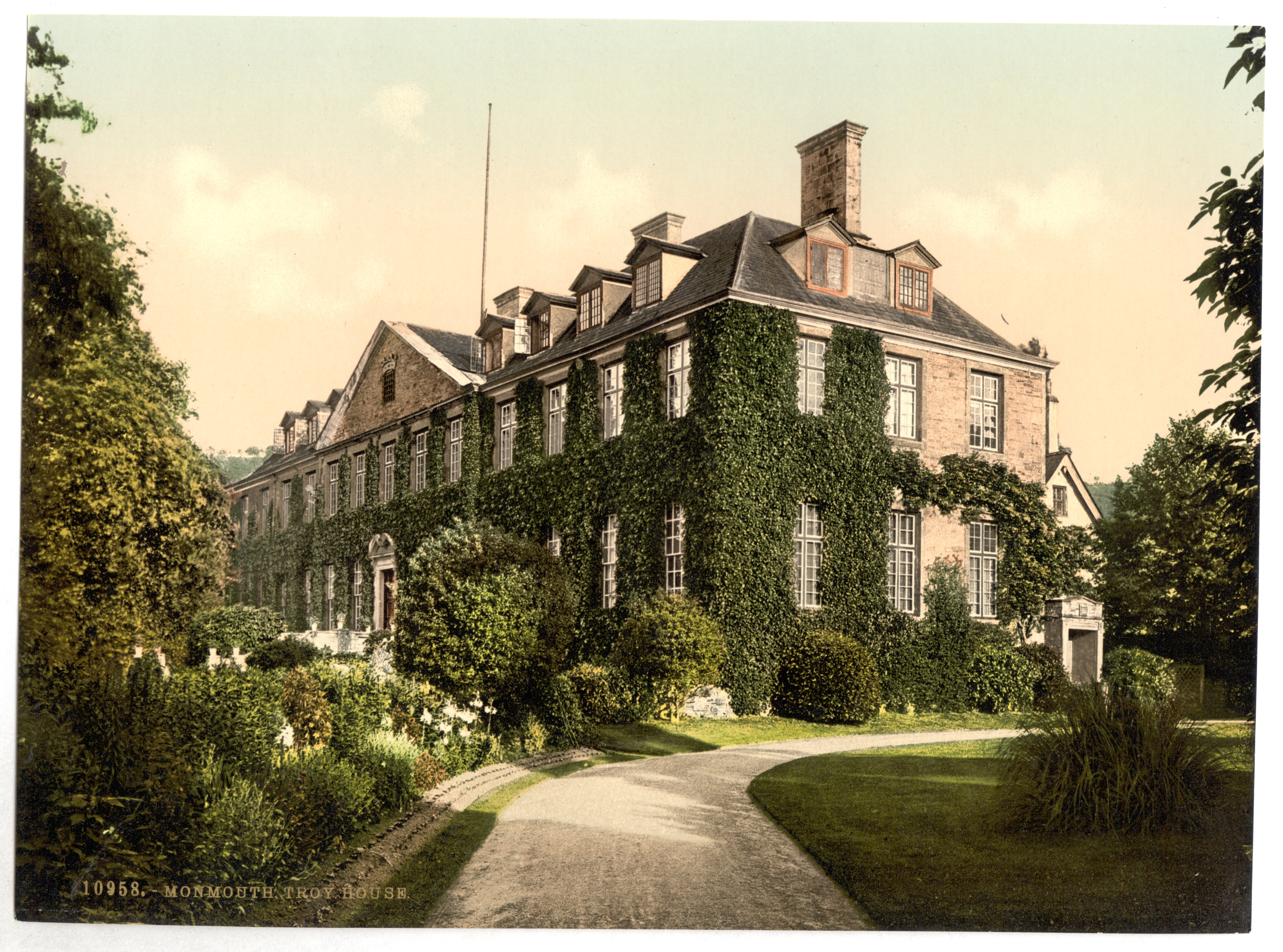
Troy House, between about 1890 and 1900

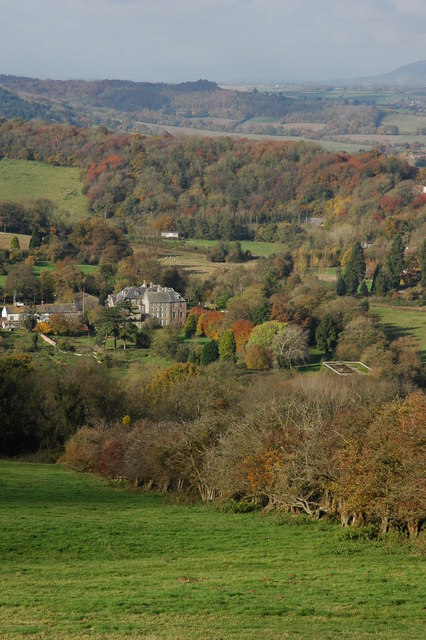
Troy House and surrounding countryside (2007)

== Sources ==
- Benson, Ann (2017). Troy House - A Tudor Estate Across Time. Cardiff: University of Wales Press. ISBN 978-1-78316-989-4.
- Bradshaw, George (2012) [1863]. Bradshaw's Descriptive Railway Hand-book of Great Britain and Ireland. Oxford: Old House Books. ISBN 978-1-908-40202-8. OCLC 1013872980.
- Coxe, William (1801). An Historical Tour in Monmouthshire. Vol. 2. London: T. Cadell, Jr. & W. Davies. OCLC 557800999.
- Dugdale, James (1819). The new British traveler or, Modern Panorama of England and Wales. Vol. 3. London: J. and J. Cundee. OCLC 60250716.
- Heath, Charles (1804). Historical and Descriptive Accounts of the Ancient and Present State of the Town of Monmouth. Monmouth: Charles Heath. OCLC 18491234.
- Hilling, John B. (2018). The Architecture of Wales: From the First to the Twenty-First Centuries. Cardiff: University of Wales Press. ISBN 978-1-786-83285-6.
- Kissack, Keith (2003). Monmouth and its Buildings. Woonton Almeley: Logaston Press. ISBN 1-904396-01-1. OCLC 55143853.
- Newman, John (2000). Gwent/Monmouthshire. The Buildings of Wales. London: Penguin. ISBN 0-14-071053-1.
- Wilson, John Marius (1872). Descriptive Imperial Gazetteer of England and Wales. London: A Fullarton. OCLC 19282318.
- Yorke, Stan (2009). Lost Railways of Gloucestershire. Newbury, Berkshire: Countryside Books. ISBN 978-1-84674-163-0.
