= Laking baronets =

Extinct baronetcy in the Baronetage of the United Kingdom

Escutcheon of the Laking baronets of Kensington

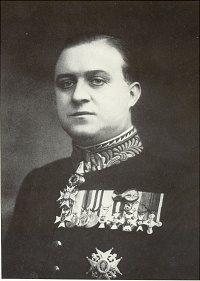
Sir Guy Francis Laking, 2nd Baronet

The Laking baronetcy, of Kensington in the Parish of Saint Mary Abbots in the Royal Borough of Kensington, London, was a title in the Baronetage of the United Kingdom. It was created on 24 July 1902 for Sir Francis Laking, Physician-in-Ordinary to Edward VII and George V. His son, the 2nd Baronet, was an art historian and the first keeper of the London Museum. The title became extinct on the early death of the latter's son, the 3rd Baronet, in 1930.

== Laking baronets, of Kensington (1902) ==
- Sir Francis Henry Laking, 1st Baronet (1847–1914)
- Sir Guy Francis Laking, 2nd Baronet (1875–1919)
- Sir Guy Francis William Laking, 3rd Baronet (1904–1930)

Baronetage of the United Kingdom
Preceded by Jackson baronets	Laking baronets of Kensington; 24 July 1902	Succeeded by Lewis baronets
