= Samuel Jackson (artist) =

English painter (1794–1869)

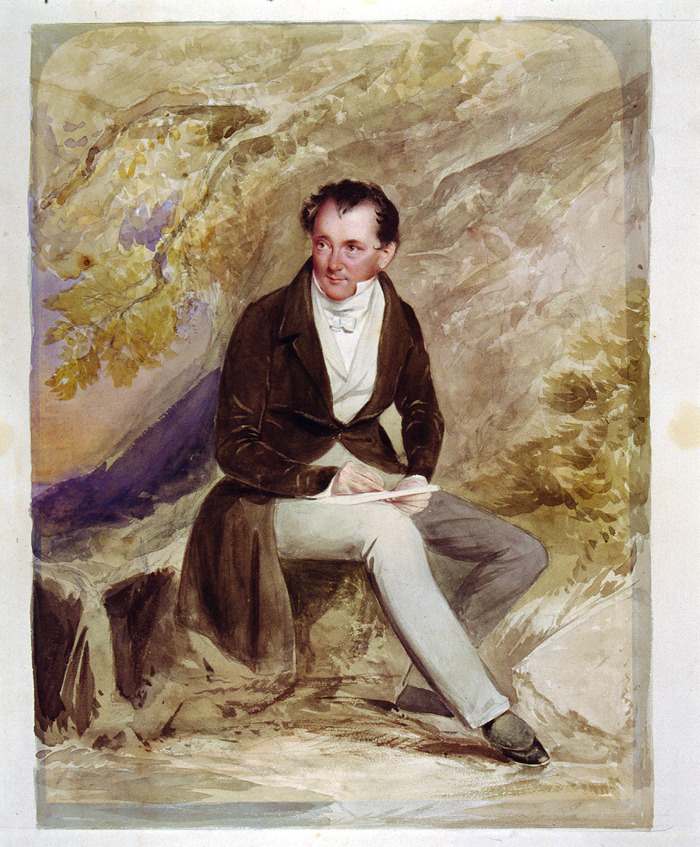
- Watercolour portrait showing the artist sketching in a landscape
- Born: 31 December 1794; Bristol
- Died: 8 December 1869 (aged 74); Clifton, Bristol
- Known for: Watercolours, Oils

Samuel Jackson (31 December 1794 – 8 December 1869) was an English watercolourist and oil painter who has been called the "father" of the Bristol School of art. He also contributed a number of drawings of scenes from Bristol to the topographical collection of George Weare Braikenridge. The Braikenridge Collection makes Bristol's early 19th-century appearance one of the best documented of any English city.

== Life ==
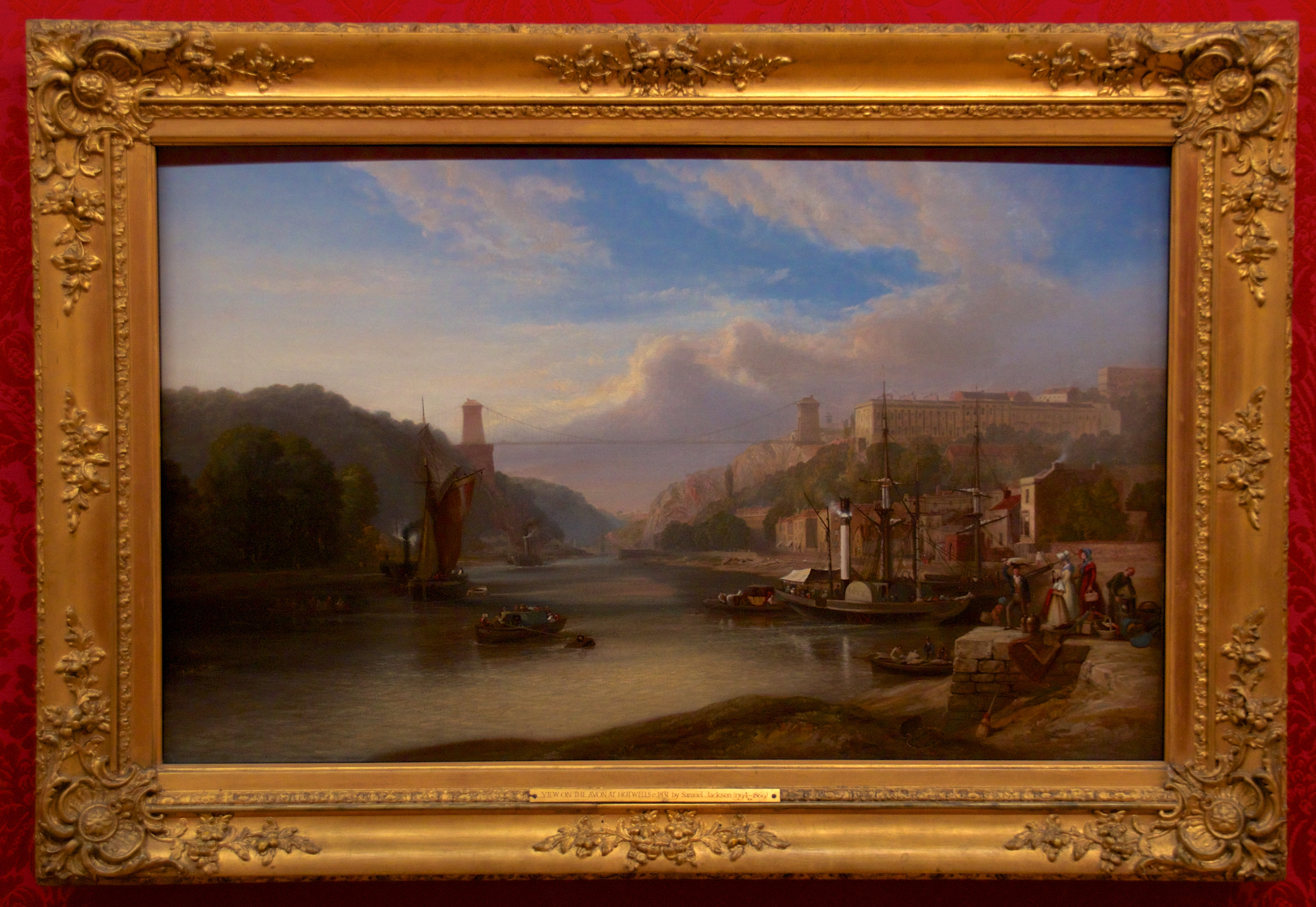
View of the Avon at Hotwells, c.1840

Jackson was born on 31 December 1794 in Bristol. His father was an accountant and later a drysalter. Jackson became a professional artist by 1822, primarily a watercolourist of landscapes. In 1823 Jackson was elected an associate member of the Society of Painters in Watercolours.

Braikenridge commissioned him to produce less than 30 watercolours, but collected many more of Jackson's Bristol scenes. His Bristol watercolours of the mid 1820s were his most highly regarded work, and have been called the most important part of the work of the Bristol School. John Lewis Roget called him "the father of the school".

Jackson was a lifelong friend of Francis Danby, whose influence is present in his watercolours. He may have been Danby's pupil. In 1823 he collaborated with Danby and James Johnson in a lithography project.

In 1824 Jackson was one of the organisers of the first exhibition by local artists at the new Bristol Institution. He also seems to have participated from 1832–33 in the revival of the Bristol School's sketching meetings.

In 1832 he was the most eminent artist in the first exhibition of the Bristol Society of Artists, and later he continued to play a large role in that society's successor, the Bristol Academy for the Promotion of Fine Arts.

Jackson may have visited the West Indies in 1827; he exhibited West Indian subjects at the Society of Painters in Watercolours in 1828 and 1831. By the 1830s he was also producing scenes of Devon and Wales, and may have visited Switzerland in 1855 and 1858 to produce watercolours of mountain scenery.

Jackson died on 8 December 1869 at Clifton, Bristol. His son was the landscape and marine painter Samuel Phillips Jackson (1830–94). His daughters Jane Roeckel and Ada Villiers were musicians.

The Braikenridge Collection, which holds many of his works, is in the Bristol Museum & Art Gallery.
