= View of the Avon at Hotwells =

Painting by Samuel Jackson

View of the Avon at Hotswells
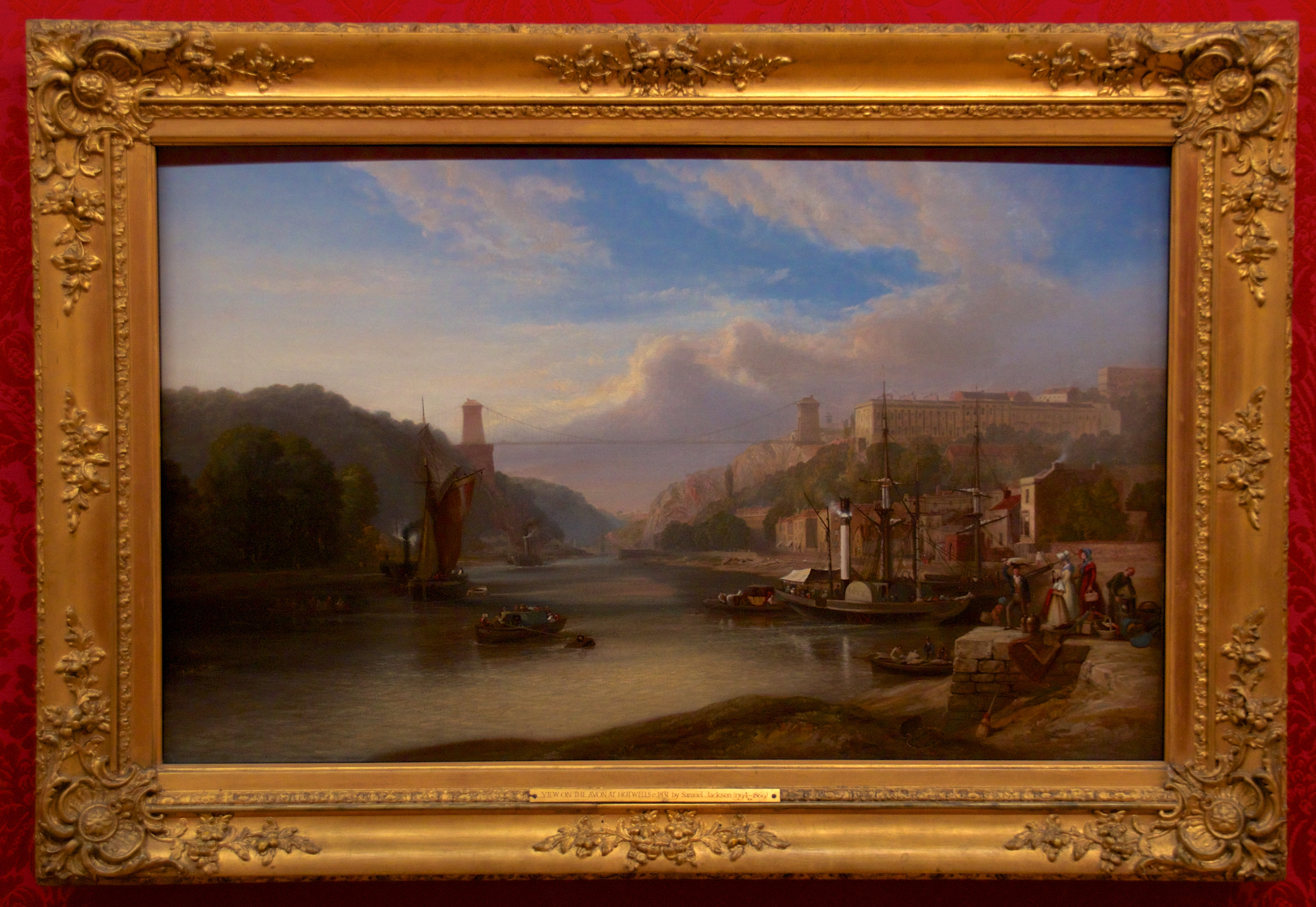
- Artist: Samuel Jackson
- Year: c.1840
- Type: Oil on canvas, landscape painting
- Dimensions: 62.9 cm × 101.6 cm (24.8 in × 40.0 in)
- Location: City Museum and Art Gallery; Bristol

View of the Avon at Hotwells is an 1840 landscape painting by the British artist Samuel Jackson. It depicts a view along the gorge of the River Avon to the east of central Bristol, featuring the Clifton Suspension Bridge designed by Isambard Kingdom Brunel, then still under construction and not finally finished until 1864 due to a lack of funds. In the foreground is the suburb of Hotwells, with Clifton uphill on the right of the painting.

Jackson was a member of the Bristol School which flourished in the city from the Regency period into the early Victorian era. He was generally known for his watercolours and this is one his few oil paintings. Today the painting is in the collection of the Bristol City Museum and Art Gallery having been acquired in 1903.

== Bibliography ==
- Carter, Julia. Bristol Museum and Art Gallery: Guide to the Art Collection. Bristol Books, 2017.
- Wright, Christopher, Gordon, Catherine May & Smith, Mary Peskett. British and Irish Paintings in Public Collections: An Index of British and Irish Oil Paintings by Artists Born Before 1870 in Public and Institutional Collections in the United Kingdom and Ireland. Yale University Press, 2006.
