= Hugh O'Neill (artist) =

- Born: 1784; Bloomsbury, London
- Died: 1824 (aged 39–40)
- Known for: Architectural drawing, Watercolour

Hugh O'Neill (1784–1824) was an English architectural and antiquarian draughtsman who contributed 441 drawings of scenes from Bristol, England to the topographical collection of George Weare Braikenridge. The Braikenridge Collection makes Bristol's early 19th century appearance one of the best documented of any English city.

O'Neill was born in Bloomsbury, London on 20 April 1784, the son of Jeremiah O'Neill, an architect. He exhibited at the Royal Academy during 1800–04. He was a drawing master at Oxford and Edinburgh, then moved to Bath in 1813.

In 1821 he settled in Bristol and worked almost exclusively thereafter for George Weare Braikenridge. Most of the commissioned works were in monochrome wash. Some of his surviving drawings suggest that he also undertook commissions for architectural alterations. He does not seem to have participated in the activities of the Bristol School of artists.

He died in Bristol on 7 April 1824.

The Braikenridge Collection is in the Bristol City Museum and Art Gallery. Some of O'Neill's early drawings are in the Ashmolean Museum, Oxford.
