= Jane Roeckel =

British composer, inventor, pianist and philanthropist

Jane Jackson Roeckel (19 October 1833 – 26 August 1907) was a British composer, inventor, pianist, and philanthropist. She composed songs and works for piano and piano rolls, including piano transcriptions of symphonies by composers such as Beethoven and Mendelssohn. She sometimes published under the pseudonym Jules de Sivrai.

== Biography ==
Roeckel was born in Clifton, England, into a family of artists and musicians. Her father was the Old Water Colour Society and Bristol School painter Samuel Jackson; her brother Samuel Phillips Jackson was also a painter; her sister Ada Villiers was a musician; and her uncle was the Austrian composer Johann Nepomuk Hummel. Roeckel studied piano and harmony first with her father, then with Jacques Blumenthal, Charles Halle, Bernhard Molique, Ernst Pauer, and Clara Schumann. In 1864, she married Joseph Leopold Roeckel, who was also a composer.

Roeckel invented the “Pamphonia,” a device used to learn the different clefs and staves. It was a model of an eleven line stave with movable bars. She composed works for piano rolls for the Aeolian Company, the Melvin Clark Piano Company, and the Wilcox & White Piano and Organ Company.

Roeckel was a philanthropist who organized many charitable concerts for struggling artists, helped establish the Bristol Scholarship at the Royal College of Music, and founded the Teachers Provident Association in 1885. Her best known charitable work was bringing the violinist Marie Hall to the attention of Philip Napier Miles, who became Hall’s benefactor. He paid Hall's living expenses in London while she attended the Royal Academy of Music, and later enabled her to study with Czech violinist Otakar Ševčík in Prague for 18 months.

Roeckel’s compositions were frequently performed by the pianist Arabella Goddard. They were published by Chappell & Company.

== Selected works ==
=== Piano ===
- arrangements of Beethoven and Mendelssohn symphonies
- Danse Russe
- Miranda, Shakespearean Illustration No. 1
- Reverie-Mazurka

=== Vocal ===
- "Drifting On"
- Moxlyn (mixed chorus)
- Our King and Queen (soprano or tenor and vocal quartet)
- "Remember Me" (by Hugh Conway; arranged by Jules de Sivrai)
- "Village Story"
