= Jacques Blumenthal =

German pianist and composer

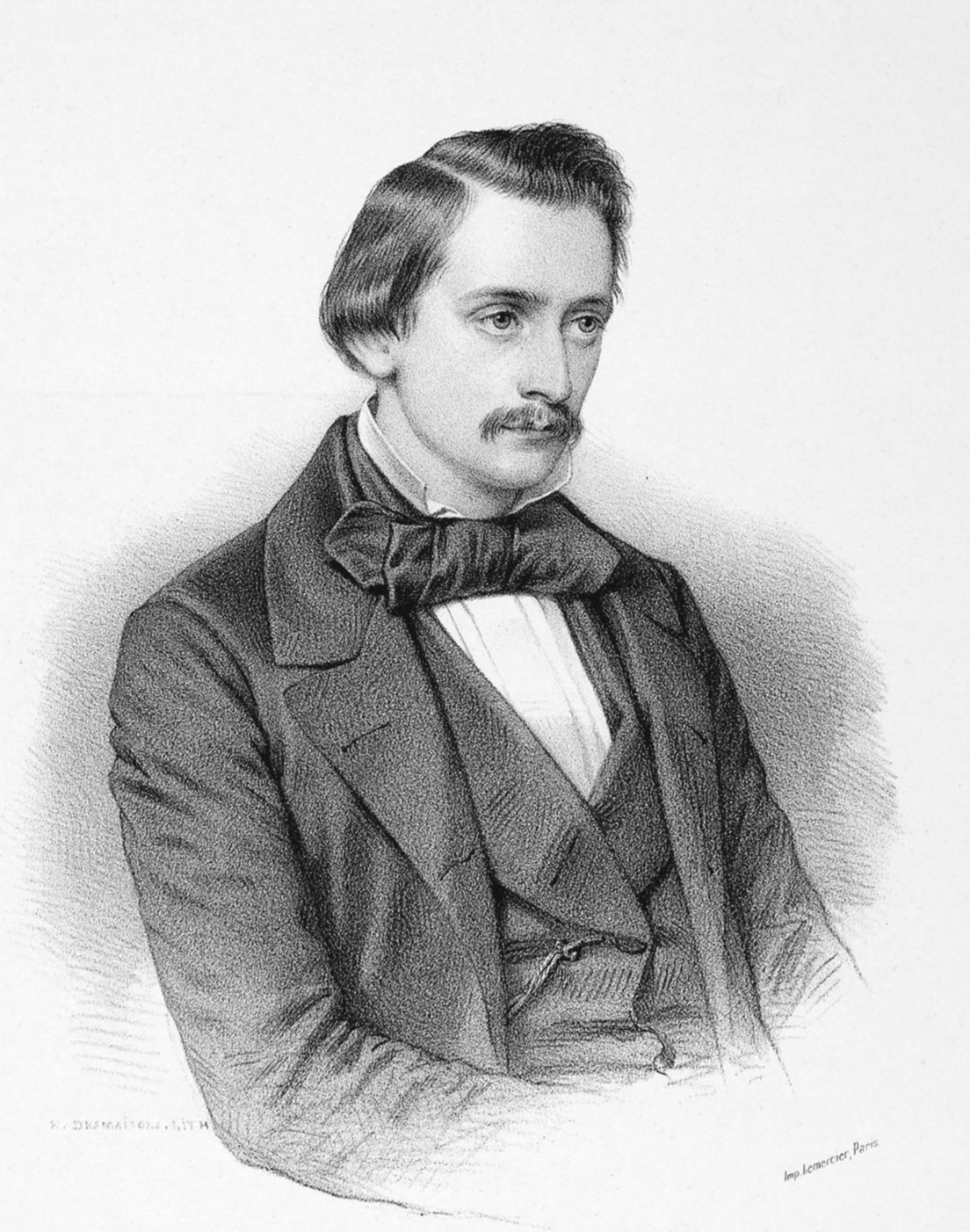
Jacques Blumenthal

Jacques Blumenthal (4 October 1829 – 17 May 1908) was a German pianist and composer. Born "Jakob" in Hamburg, he began his musical studies at an early age, receiving instruction from Friedrich Wilhelm Grund, Carl Maria von Bocklet, and Simon Sechter. In 1846 he entered the Conservatoire de Paris, where he studied the piano under the tutelage of Henri Herz and Fromental Halévy.

In 1848 Blumenthal settled in London, where he became the pianist to Queen Victoria. The position contributed to his demand as a teacher in London society, and he prospered greatly. His students included composer Jane Roeckel.

Blumenthal also composed a number of works; his short piano pieces and songs achieved considerable popularity, though his efforts at larger pieces did not meet with similar success. He died at his home in Cheyne Walk, Chelsea in May 1908; his widow, Léonie Souvoroff Blumenthal, née Gore, assigned the copyrights of his music to the Royal Society of Musicians.

== Selected compositions ==
Piano music

- La Source. Caprice, Op. 1 (Paris: Brandus & Cie., 1849)
- Trois Mazurkas, Op. 20 (Paris: Brandus & Cie., 1851)
- Fleurs emblématiques, Op. 21
- Le Gondolier du Lido. Barcarolle, Op. 40 (London: Cramer, Beale & Chappel)
- Chant du cigne. Mélodie plaintive, Op. 51 (London: Chappell)
- L'Étoile du soir. 3e Valse, Op. 52 (Paris: G. Brandus et S. Dufour, 1859)
- La Petite Russie. Mélodie des Bohémiens Russes, Op. 61 (London, 1862)
- La Stella de L'Aranella. Chanson napolitaine, Op. 70 (London: Augener & Co.)

Songs

- The Message (A. Procter) (London, 1864)
- The Requital (A. Procter) (London, 1864)
- The Days are Past (Barry Cornwall) (London: Ashdown & Parry, c.1877)
- We Two (Rea) (London, 1879)
- My Queen (Stella) (1867)
- Looking Beyond (Henry Ffrench) (London: J. & J. Hopkinson, c.1887)
