= George Weare Braikenridge =

English antiquarian

- Born: 4 January 1775; Hanover County, Colony of Virginia
- Died: 16 February 1856 (aged 81); Brislington, Bristol, England
- Occupations: Merchant, Antiquarian
- Known for: Braikenridge Collection

George Weare Braikenridge FSA (1775–1856) was an English antiquarian. He was born in the Colony of Virginia, but lived most of his life in Bristol, England, where he created a large collection of Bristolian historical and topographical material known as the Braikenridge Collection. It contains over 1400 drawings and watercolours of Bristol landscapes and buildings. These are held in Bristol City Museum and Art Gallery, with related collections of manuscripts and other items held by Bristol Central Library and Bristol Archives. The Braikenridge Collection has become the most important historical record of Bristol's appearance in the early 19th century, and makes Bristol one of the best documented English cities in this respect.

== Life ==
His father, George Braikenridge (1738–1827), was from Brislington, Bristol, but was a tobacco planter and merchant living in the Colony of Virginia at the time of Braikenridge's birth in 1775, having married Sarah "Sally" Jerdone, daughter of Virginian merchant and planter Francis Jerdone. After returning to Bristol, they became partners as George Braikenridge and Son, a drysaltery business. George Weare Braikenridge married Mary Bush in 1800. He subsequently became a merchant trading with the Caribbean and became a "senior partner in a leading and long-established West India firm". Retiring in 1820, he devoted himself to antiquarianism.

In 1823, he purchased Broomwell House, Brislington, to which he added a gothic library, and started to fill the house with collected items of stonework, woodcarving, and stained glass. Although Broomwell House no longer survives, some items, particularly the library's heraldic ceiling, do as he later transferred them to a villa in Clevedon, Somerset, which he purchased in 1839. He was also the largest donor in the building of Christ Church, Clevedon, which was consecrated that same year. It contains stained glass provided by Braikenridge in its east window.

From 1818, he was a mortgagee for Shaws plantation on Nevis (which in 1817 had 69 enslaved people working on it); in 1836 (after the abolition of slavery), he inherited the plantation from his Bristol-based cousin, William Weare. When compensation was awarded by the British Government to owners of enslaved people following the abolition of slavery in 1833, he received £1,455 for 157 enslaved people in St. Elizabeth, Jamaica.

He died in 1856 at Broomwell House. His collections relating to Bristol were bequeathed to the city on the death of the last of his children, William Jerdone Braikenridge (1817–1907). A smaller collection relating to Somerset was bequeathed to the town of Taunton. Other objects are in museums around the world. The most valuable items auctioned in a two-day sale at Christie's in 1908 were a 12th-century ciborium, which raised £6,000, now at The Morgan Library & Museum, and a 16th-century mazer bowl, which went for £2,300. A third item in the Braikenridge sale was a late medieval cradle, the so-called "cradle of Henry V", which was purchased on behalf of King Edward VII for 230 guineas.

Braikenridge played an important role as a patron of the Bristol School of artists. Only three other consistent patrons of the school have been identified, namely the industrialists John Gibbons, Daniel Wade Acraman, and Charles Hare. He was also important in encouraging Francis Danby's interest in landscape.

== Collections ==
Braikenridge's activity mainly focused on his copy of William Barrett's History and Antiquities of the City of Bristol. It was common then for possessors of such histories to extra-illustrate or "grangerise" them, that is, to collect additional illustrations to be interleaved with the text. The items that Braikenridge collected for this purpose were eventually sufficient to fill 36 portfolios. They included various printed, engraved, and written materials and assorted ephemera. Braikenridge's copy of Barrett's book and this interleaved collection are in the Bristol Central Library.

He had a further collection of over 1400 drawings and watercolours of Bristol landscapes and buildings, which he also organised in line with the chapters of Barrett's book. He commissioned many of these drawings from local artists; over two-thirds of them from Hugh O'Neill, Thomas Leeson Scrase Rowbotham, and Joseph Manning. Others were mainly from Samuel Jackson, James Johnson, Edward Cashin, George William Delamotte, John Eden, and Marcus Holmes, although around 40 artists are represented. This collection is in the Bristol Museum.

In addition to the collection organised around Barrett's book, Braikenridge obtained more watercolours by Samuel Jackson, oil paintings and watercolours by Francis Danby, and drawings by Samuel Hieronymus Grimm. The paintings by Danby were atmospheric rather than topographical.

Braikenridge had a similar but smaller collection for Somerset, created in the 1830s and based around his extra-illustration of John Collinson's History and Antiquities of the County of Somerset. For this, the drawings were mainly commissioned from the local artist William Walter Wheatley. This collection is held by the Museum of Somerset, Taunton.

Braikenridge was also a collector of fossils. Among his specimens were the head of an ichthyosaur, which he retrieved in 1813 from a quarry in Keynsham, Somerset, and an ammonite fossil, which he discovered at Dundry, Somerset, and which has been named after him: Normannites braikenridgii. His collection was known to the geologist William Daniel Conybeare. He was also a fellow of the Society of Antiquaries and the Geological Society.
