= Nathan Cooper Branwhite =

English artist from Bristol (1775–1857)

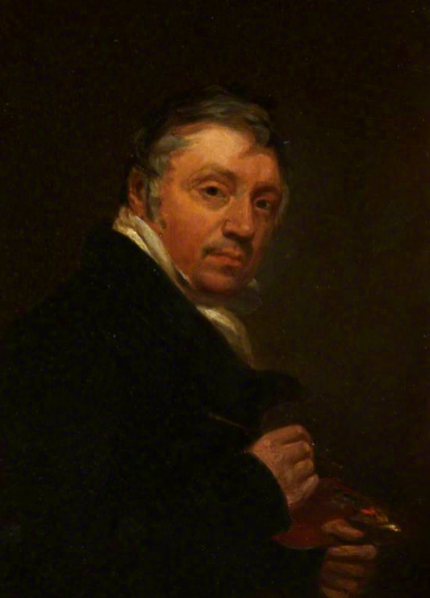
- Born: c. 1775; St Albans, Hertfordshire
- Died: 18 March 1857; Clifton, Bristol
- Known for: Portrait miniature, Watercolour, Engraving

Nathan Cooper Branwhite (c. 1775 – 18 March 1857) was an English miniature portrait painter, watercolourist and engraver who was a member of the Bristol School of artists. He was Bristol's leading miniature portrait painter in the 1820s.

== Life ==
Branwhite was born in St Albans, Hertfordshire, the son of a poet, Peregrine Branwhite, and became a pupil of Isaac Taylor. He exhibited 13 miniatures at the Royal Academy between 1802 and 1828. He was also a stipple engraver. By 1810 he was living in Bristol. He participated in the sketching activities of the Bristol School and was a friend of Edward Bird and James Johnson. In 1824 he was one of the organisers of the first exhibition of local artists at the new Bristol Institution. In 1832 he exhibited a number of works at the first exhibition of the newly formed Bristol Society of Artists, also at the Bristol Institution.

Branwhite died on 18 March 1857 in Clifton, Bristol. He had at least four children. His sons Nathan (1813–94) and Charles (1817–80) were both artists.
