= Lewis baronets of Portland Place and The Danish Pavilion (1902) =

The Lewis baronetcy, of Portland Place in Marylebone in the County of London and of The Danish Pavilion in Overstrand in the County of Norfolk, was created in the Baronetage of the United Kingdom on 24 July 1902 for the lawyer Sir George Lewis. The title became extinct when the 3rd Baronet was killed in action in 1945.

== Lewis baronets, of Portland Place and The Danish Pavilion (1902) ==
- Sir George Henry Lewis, 1st Baronet (1835–1911)
- Sir George James Graham Lewis, 2nd Baronet (1868–1927)
- Sir George James Ernest Lewis, 3rd Baronet (1910–1945)

== Notes ==
Baronetage of the United Kingdom
Preceded by Laking baronets	Lewis baronets of Portland Place and The Danish Pavilion; 24 July 1902	Succeeded by Lipton baronets
