= Joseph Leopold Röckel =

Joseph Leopold Röckel (born London, 11 April 1838; died Vittel, Vosges, France, 20 June 1923), was a composer and music teacher. He published under the pseudonyms Eduard Doorn and Banner Holm.

Röckel studied at the music schools of Franz Xavier Eisenhofer, in Würzburg, and of Auguste Götze in Weimar, Germany, then left for England, and settled in Clifton, Bristol, where his songwriting was much appreciated. In 1864 he married the pianist and composer Jane Jackson (1833–1907). Besides writing songs like “Madeleine,” he composed several cantatas, such as Fair Rosamond, Ruth, The Sea Maidens, Westward Ho, Mary Stuart and The Victorian Age.

== References and notes ==
Sheet music for some of Röckel's songs is archived at archive.org: Röckel, Joseph Leopold
