= Peregrine Branwhite =

English poet (1745 - 1795)

Peregrine Branwhite (1745–1795?), was an English poet.

== Life ==
Branwhite was son of Rowland Branwhite and Sarah (Brooke) his wife, and was baptised at Lavenham, Suffolk on 22 July 1745. He was brought up to the bombazine trade, which he carried on for some time at Norwich. He was not very successful, however, as he seems to have paid more attention to books than to the shop. He afterwards established a branch of the St. Anne's School (London) at Lavenham, and conducted it personally for some years. A year or two before his death he moved to Hackney, and died, in or about 1795, at 32 Primrose Street, Bishopsgate Street, London.

In 1783, a new edition of Phineas Fletcher's allegorical poem The Purple Island, or the Isle of Man was published, edited, with a preface and notes, by Branwhite.

The miniature painter and engraver Nathan Cooper Branwhite was his son.

== Writings ==
- Thoughts on the Death of Mr. Woodmason's children, destroyed by fire 18 Jan. 1782 (anon.)
- An Elegy on the lamented Death of Mrs. Hickman, wife of the Rev. Thomas Hickman of Bildeston, Suffolk, who died 7 Sept, 1789, when but just turned of 19 (Bury St. Edmunds 1790)
- Astronomy, or a description of the Solar System (Sudbury, 1791)
- The Lottery, or the Effects of Sudden Affluence (manuscript)
