= James Johnson (English artist) =

English painter (1803–1834)

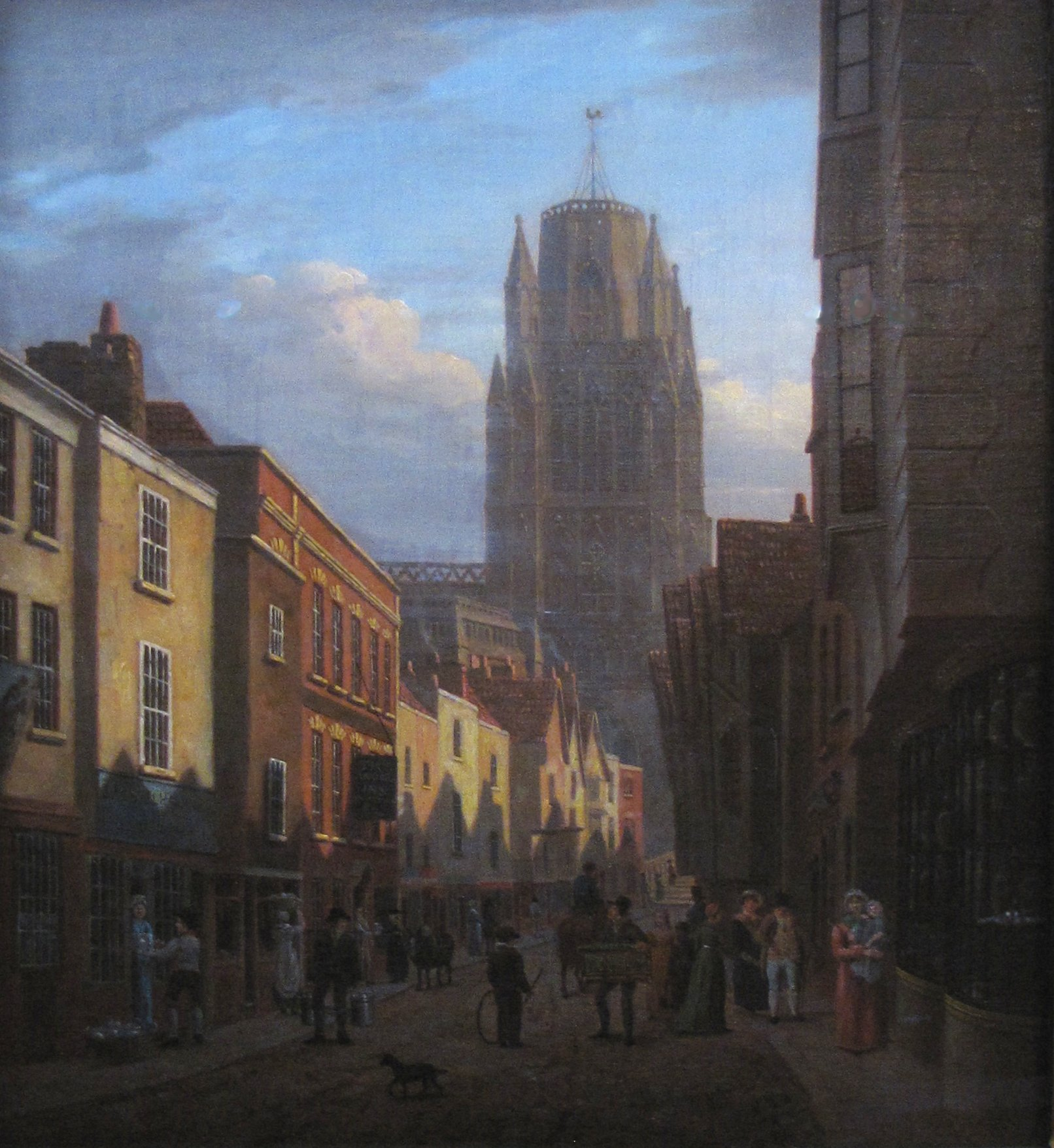
- Redcliffe Street, oil on canvas, c. 1825
- Born: 1803; Downend, Bristol
- Died: 1834 (aged 30–31); Bath, Somerset
- Known for: Architectural drawing, Watercolour, Oil painting

James Johnson (1803–1834) was an English architectural draughtsman, watercolourist and oil painter who was a member of the Bristol School of artists. He contributed nearly 50 drawings of scenes from Bristol, England to the topographical collection of George Weare Braikenridge. The Braikenridge Collection makes Bristol's early 19th century appearance one of the best documented of any English city. Johnson was also a painter of poetic landscapes in oil.

Johnson was born in 1803 at Downend near Bristol. His father was a publican. By 1819 he was producing drawings, and he exhibited a landscape at the Royal Academy in 1822. In Bristol he participated in the evening sketching meetings of the Bristol School, and in 1823 he collaborated with Francis Danby and Samuel Jackson in a lithography project.

In 1824 Johnson was one of the organisers of the exhibition of local artists at the new Bristol Institution. However finding it difficult to sell his work he moved to London in 1825 - "starved out" of Bristol, according to John Eagles, a fellow member of the Bristol School. He exhibited landscapes at the Royal Academy again in 1825 and 1826.

In 1826 he returned to Bristol and then moved to Bath, Somerset, where he became a teacher of drawing. However he continued to produce Bristol drawings for Braikenridge, including some very fine watercolours of church interiors in 1828. He died in Bath in 1834 after throwing himself from a window.

The Braikenridge Collection is in the Bristol City Museum and Art Gallery. The Tate Gallery has one of his romantic landscape oil paintings, The Tranquil Lake: Sunset Seen through a Ruined Abbey, which has been called one of the finest landscapes of the Bristol School
