= Guy Francis Laking =

English art historian

Sir Guy Francis Laking
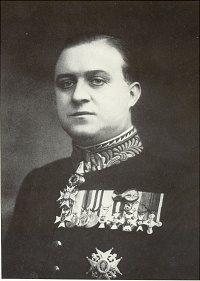
- Sir Guy Francis Laking, Bt
- Born: 21 October 1875
- Died: 22 November 1919 (aged 44); London
- Education: Westminster School
- Occupation: English art historian
- Spouse: Beatrice Ida Barker
- Children: 2
- Father: Sir Francis Henry Laking, 1st Baronet

Sir Guy Francis Laking, 2nd Baronet CB MVO (21 October 1875 – 22 November 1919) was an English art historian and the first keeper of the London Museum from before its opening until his death.

== Life ==
Laking was born in 1875, the only son of King Edward VII's Physician in Ordinary Sir Francis Laking (created a Baronet in 1902), by his wife Emma Ann Mansell. He was educated at Westminster School, and showed an interest in armour from an early age, as is apparent from his essay The Sword of Joan of Arc, written when 10 years old. In 1891 he met the Baron de Cosson, then considered the foremost expert on arms and armour, an acquaintance that was influential to his career. Later he joined Christie's as an art advisor; his first work was the sales catalogue of the Zschille collection, sold in January 1897. He then compiled catalogues for the Gurney, Spiller, Breadalbane, Kennedy and North collections of arms and armour. In 1900 he was invited by the Governor of Malta, Lord Grenfell, to catalogue the antiquities there, the result was the book The Armoury of The Knights of St. John of Jerusalem. In December 1901 he was appointed a Member (fourth class) of the Royal Victorian Order (MVO), and in January 1902 King Edward VII created the post of Keeper of the King's Armoury at Windsor for him. Besides, he was Inspector of the Armoury at the Wallace Collection, and in 1911 became the first Keeper of the London Museum, where he was tasked with acquiring, cataloguing and arranging the collection. He lived in London, on Avenue Road, in his house Meyrick Lodge named after Samuel Meyrick, the founder of English armour studies. He was a Vice President of the Meyrick Society, founded by collectors and historians of arms and armour. He died from a heart attack and was buried in the Laking family grave on the western side of Highgate Cemetery.

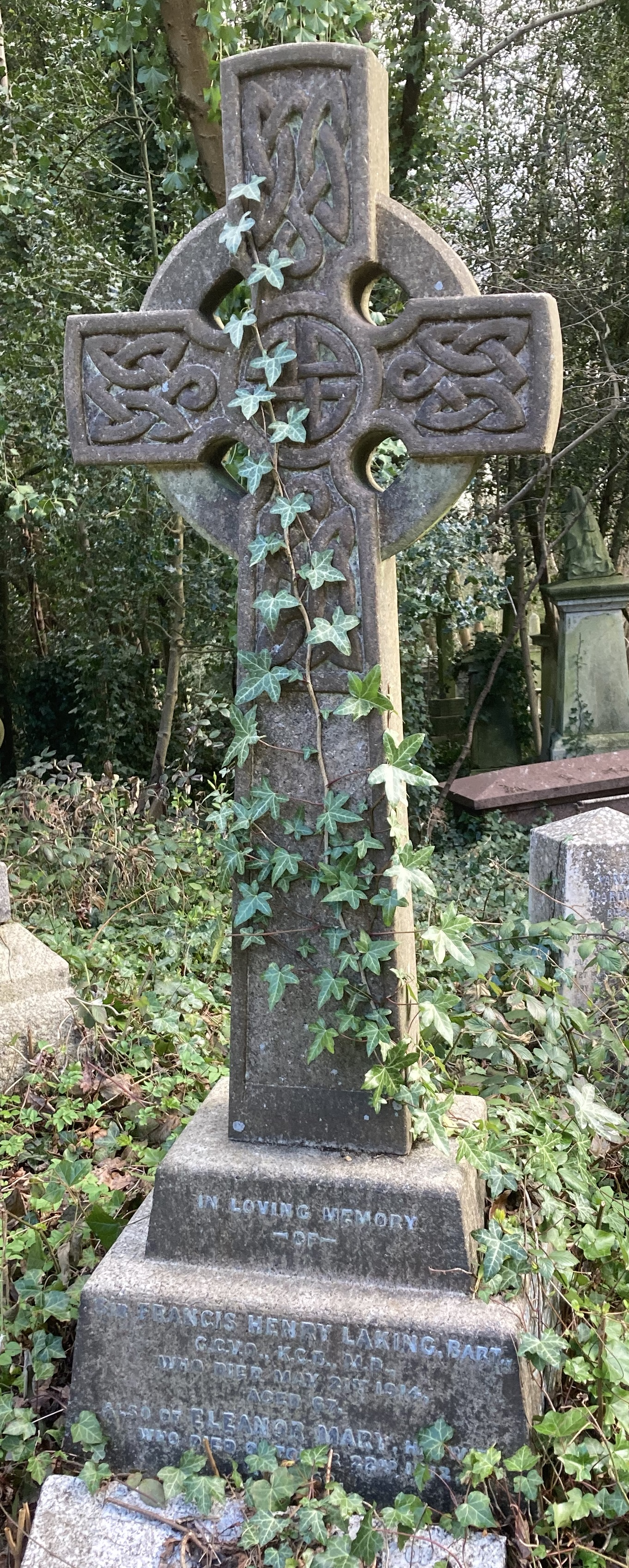
Grave of Sir Guy Francis Laking at Highgate Cemetery (west side)

Laking was a member of the Garrick Club.

== Family ==
Laking married Beatrice Ida Barker (25 September 1873 – 23 November 1923), and they had two children, Joan (born 1900) and Sir Guy Francis William Laking, 3rd Baronet (3 January 1904 – 4 August 1930), whose photographs, taken in 1920 and 1921 at Bassano Ltd, are in the collection of the National Portrait Gallery. On the death of the 3rd baronet, the baronetcy became extinct.

=== Recent controversy ===
In 2004, Norwegian biographer Tor Bomann-Larsen put forward the hypothesis that King Olav V of Norway was not the biological son of King Haakon VII, but his mother, Queen Maud, had been, in 1902 in London, artificially inseminated by Sir Francis Laking, a Physician to the Royal Household.

In October 2004, in the second Volume of Folket, his history of King Haakon VII and Queen Maud, the author Tor Bomann-Larsen presents evidence that in October 1902 then-Princess Maud stayed (secretly) in a London Hospital under the care of Sir Francis Henry Laking, 1st Baronet, physician-in-ordinary and surgeon-apothecary to King Edward VII of the United Kingdom (Princess Maud's father), and that during this secret hospital stay, Sir Francis artificially inseminated Princess Maud, who gave birth to Prince Alexander (the future King Olav V) some nine months later. Mr. Bomann-Larsen further implies, but does not directly state, that the sperm donor was Sir Francis's son, Guy Francis Laking.

In March 2005, Odd Arvid Storsveen, a Historian at the University of Oslo, published a review of Mr. Bomann-Larsen's book in Historisk Tidsskrift. In this review, Mr. Storsveen claims he could not find adequate sourcing for Bomann-Larsen's "hypothesis" about King Olav V's paternity.

== Publications ==
- The Sword of Joan of Arc (1885)
- The Armoury of The Knights of St. John of Jerusalem (1902)
- The Armoury of Windsor Castle: European Section (1904)
- The Furniture of Windsor Castle (1905)
- The Sèvres Porcelain of Buckingham Palace (1907)
- Catalogue of the European Armour and Arms in the Wallace Collection at Hertford House (1910)
- A Record of European Armour and Arms through Seven Centuries (1919)

== Notes ==
Baronetage of the United Kingdom
Preceded by Francis Laking	Baronet (of Kensington); 1914–1919	Succeeded by Guy Laking
