= Charles Branwhite =

English painter (1817–1880)

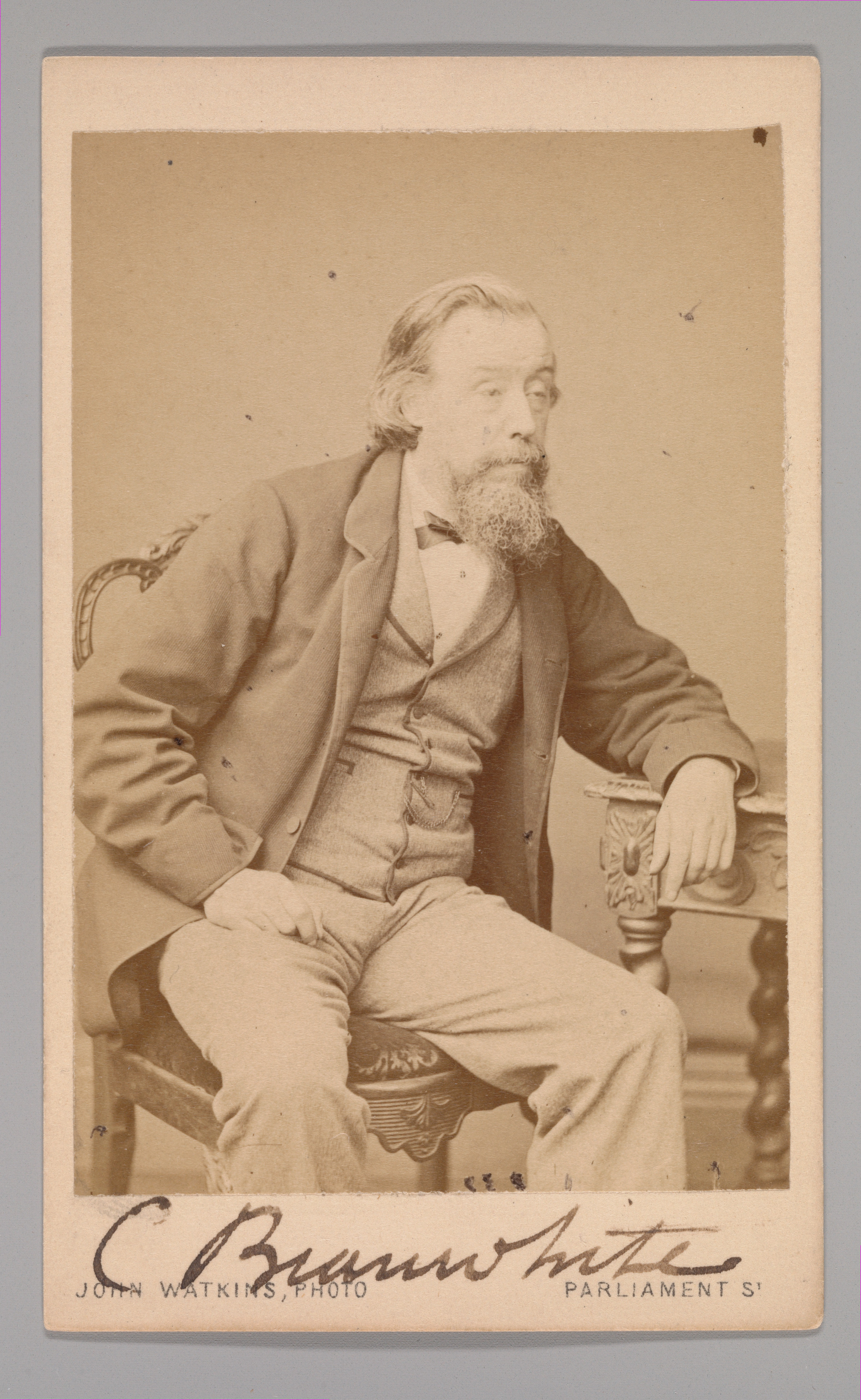
Charles Branwhite in the 1860s

Charles Branwhite (1817 – 15 February 1880) was an English landscape painter.

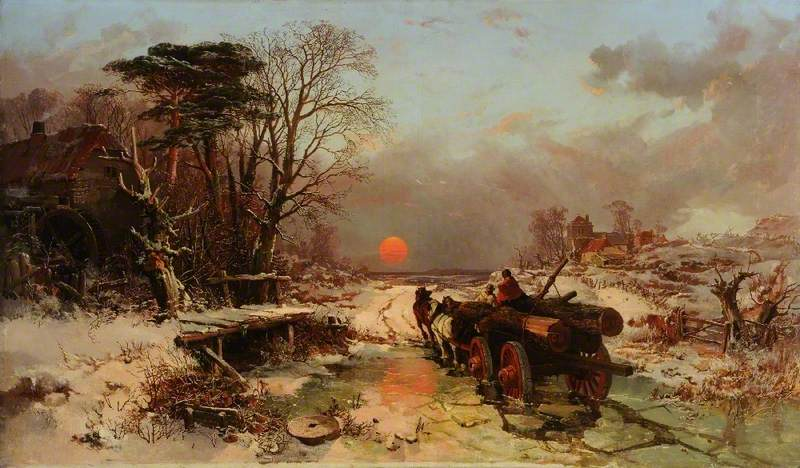
Winter scene by Charles Branwhite, Museums Sheffield

Son of Nathan Cooper Branwhite, he was born at Bristol in 1817, and there studied art under his father, beginning as a sculptor. His association and friendship, however, with William James Müller, also a native of Bristol, induced him to give his undivided attention to water-colour painting, and his pictures, from the year 1849, formed no small attraction in the gallery in Pall Mall East. He adopted this change of art notwithstanding the fact that he had gained silver medals for bas-reliefs in 1837 and 1838 at the Society of Arts. His style of painting shows much of Müller's influence. Some of his most striking landscapes represent frost scenes.

Among his works are: Post Haste, April Showers on the Eastern Coast, An old Lime-kiln, Kilgarren Castle, Winter Sunset, Old Salmon Trap on the Conway, The Environs of an Ancient Garden, 1852, A Frozen Ferry, 1853 (this and the previous picture received prizes from the Glasgow Art Union), Ferry on the Thames (at the 1862 International Exhibition), A Black Frost, Snow Storm, North Wales, Salmon Poaching, and On the River Dee, North Wales.

Bristol City Museum has several works, and other English museums have examples. His son Charles Brook Branwhite (1851-1929) was also a landscape painter, mostly in watercolour, and often of coastal or river scenes.
