= Tor Bomann-Larsen =

Norwegian author and painter

- Born: 26 April 1951 (age 75); Jevnaker, Norway
- Occupations: illustrator, children's writer, non-fiction writer, novelist and government scholar
- Awards: Cappelen Prize (1993); Brage Prize (2004)

Tor Bomann-Larsen (born 26 April 1951) is a Norwegian illustrator, children's writer, non-fiction writer, novelist and government scholar.

== Biography ==
Tor Bomann-Larsen was born in Jevnaker, Oppland on 26 April 1951, a son of engineer Erik Bomann-Larsen and Solveig Gjerde. He married illustrator Hilde Diesen in 1975.

Educated at Einar Granum’s art school in Oslo, and at Fachhochschule Münster in Germany, he started his career as a satirical illustrator for various newspapers, including Budstikka, Friheten, Ny tid, Dagbladet, Nationen and Arbederbladet. He has written biographies of explorers Fridtjof Nansen and Roald Amundsen and writer Sigurd Christiansen.

He was one of the two recipients of the Cappelen Prize for 1993, and of the Brage Prize for non-fiction in 2004. The Brage Prize was awarded for Bomann-Larsens' second volume of his biography of King Haakon VII and Queen Maud of Norway. After seven volumes, the latest published in 2016, the time period covers more than 70 years, from the birth of Princess Maud of Wales (future Queen Maud) in 1869 until the relationship between the US president Franklin D. Roosevelt and Crown Princess Märtha of Norway during World War II.

Awards
Preceded by Axel Jensen	Recipient of the Cappelen Prize; 1993	Succeeded by no award for 1994
