= London Museum (1912–1976) =

Former museum in London

Coordinates: 51.5052°N 0.1880°W

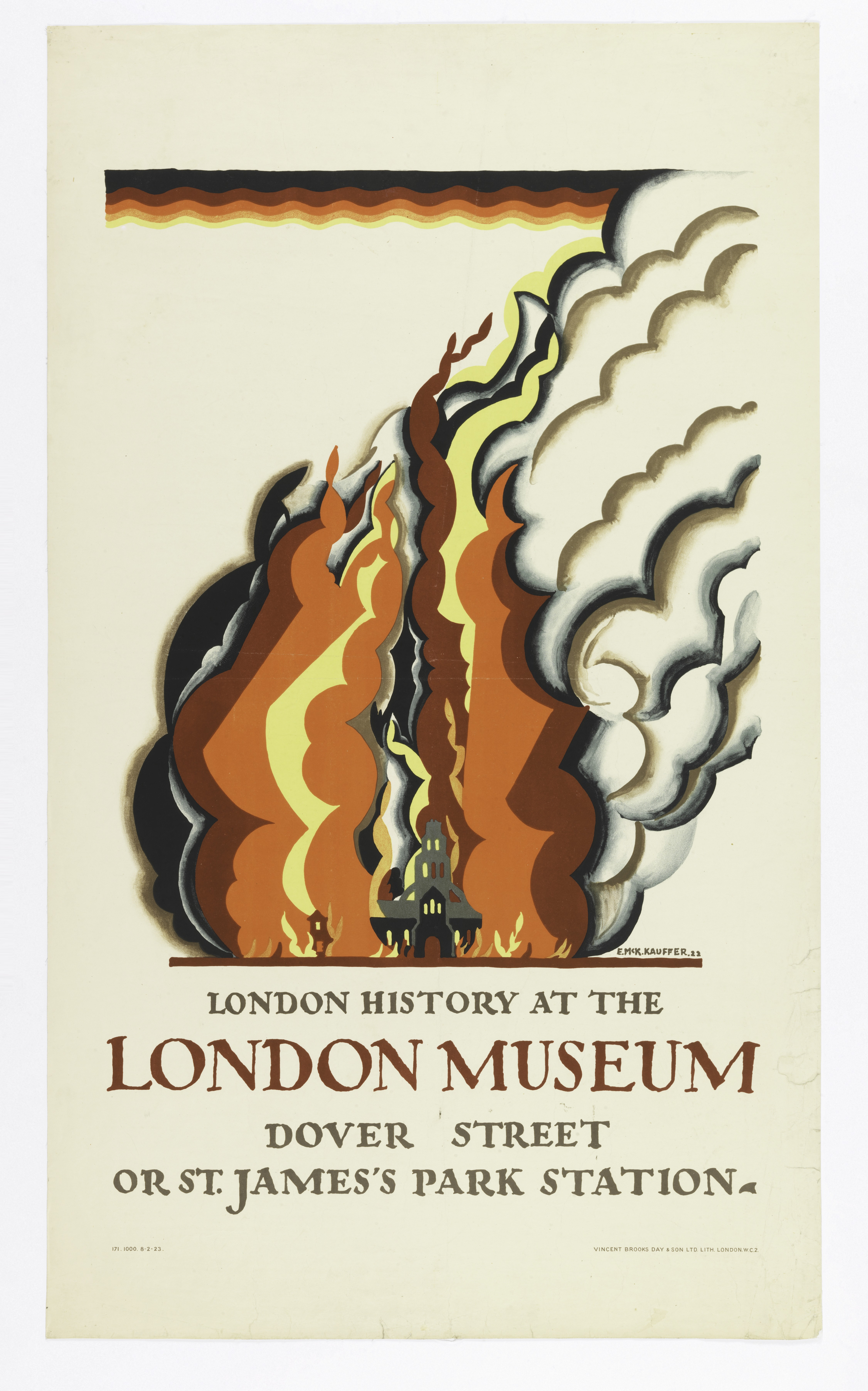
Poster by Edward McKnight Kauffer advertising "London History at the London Museum", for London Underground, 1922

The London Museum, established in 1912, was a museum illustrating the history of London, England. It was one of two precursors to the Museum of London, which opened in 1976 and was renamed the London Museum in 2024.

== History ==
It was inaugurated on 21 March 1912 by King George V with Queen Mary, Princess Mary and Prince George in temporary accommodation within the second-floor State Apartments at Kensington Palace. It opened to the public on 8 April, admitting more than 13,000 visitors during the day. The museum acquired the Cheapside Hoard in the same year, a cache of early Stuart and Elizabethan jewellery.

Two years after opening, the collections were moved to Lancaster House in St James's, and the museum remained there until World War II. The first Keeper of the museum was Sir Guy Francis Laking, and from 1926 to 1944 the Keeper was the archaeologist Mortimer Wheeler. During World War II, much of the collection was evacuated for storage at nearby Dover Street tube station, and later at Piccadilly Circus tube station. Some of the galleries at Lancaster House reopened to the public in 1942, but in November 1943 the building was requisitioned by the Ministry of Works as a conference centre and base for the new European Advisory Commission, the museum retaining only the basement for storage of its collections.

After World War II, attempts to reclaim Lancaster House for the museum's use failed. Eventually in 1948 George VI agreed that the museum might be accommodated once more in part of Kensington Palace, this time on the lower two floors, and it reopened there in July 1951. In 1975, under the directorship of Donald Harden, the London Museum was amalgamated with the City of London's Guildhall Museum to form the Museum of London, which opened to the public in a new building in the City of London in 1976.

== Sources ==
- Wheeler, Sir Mortimer (1955). Still Digging. London: Michael Joseph.
- Sheppard, Francis (1991). The Treasury of London's Past: An Historical Account of the Museum of London and its Predecessors, the Guildhall Museum and the London Museum. London: H.M.S.O. ISBN 0112904920.
