= Royal Academy Exhibition of 1842 =

1842 art exhibition in London

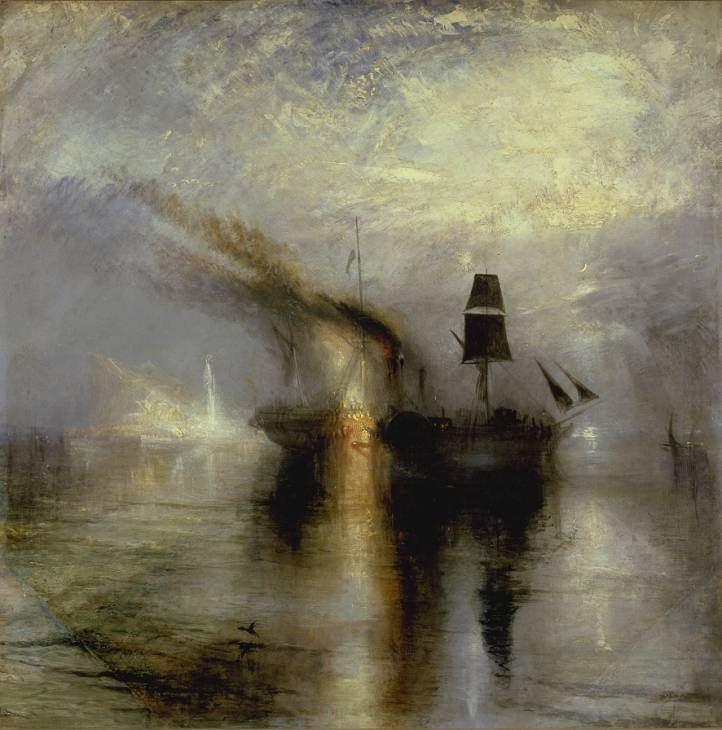
Peace – Burial at Sea by J.M.W. Turner

The Royal Academy Exhibition of 1842 was an art exhibition held at the National Gallery in Trafalgar Square in London between 2 May and 23 July 1842. It was the seventy fourth annual Summer Exhibition of the British Royal Academy of Arts. It took place during the early Victorian era and featured submissions from leading painters, sculptors and architects of the period.

The greatest attention was drawn by five paintings by J.M.W. Turner. These included two cityscapes of Venice and Snow Storm: Steam-Boat off a Harbour's Mouth. His War. The Exile and the Rock Limpet showing Napoleon under British guard in exile on the island of Saint Helena was almost universally savaged by critics, although the praise of Turner's admirer John Ruskin.

It was the first exhibition to be held since the death of David Wilkie, a leading member of the Academy for several decades, who has died near Gibraltar while travelling back from the Holy Land. His friend Turner paid tribute to him with his painting Peace – Burial at Sea. Another friend William Collins, who had named his son Wilkie Collins in his honour, displayed a picture of Wilkie's Kensington house View of Sir David Wilkie's House in Kensington. Several of Wilkie's paintings from his trip were shown posthumously including the Portrait of Abdülmecid I and Portrait of Muhammad Ali of Egypt. After a period of absence Edwin Landseer returned to the Academy after several years absence, displaying works he had produced for Queen Victoria. Crossing the Ford, the only work sent in by the Irish artist William Mulready, was one of the most popular paintings on display. Daniel Maclise sent in the large theatrical canvas The Play Scene in Hamlet.

== Gallery ==
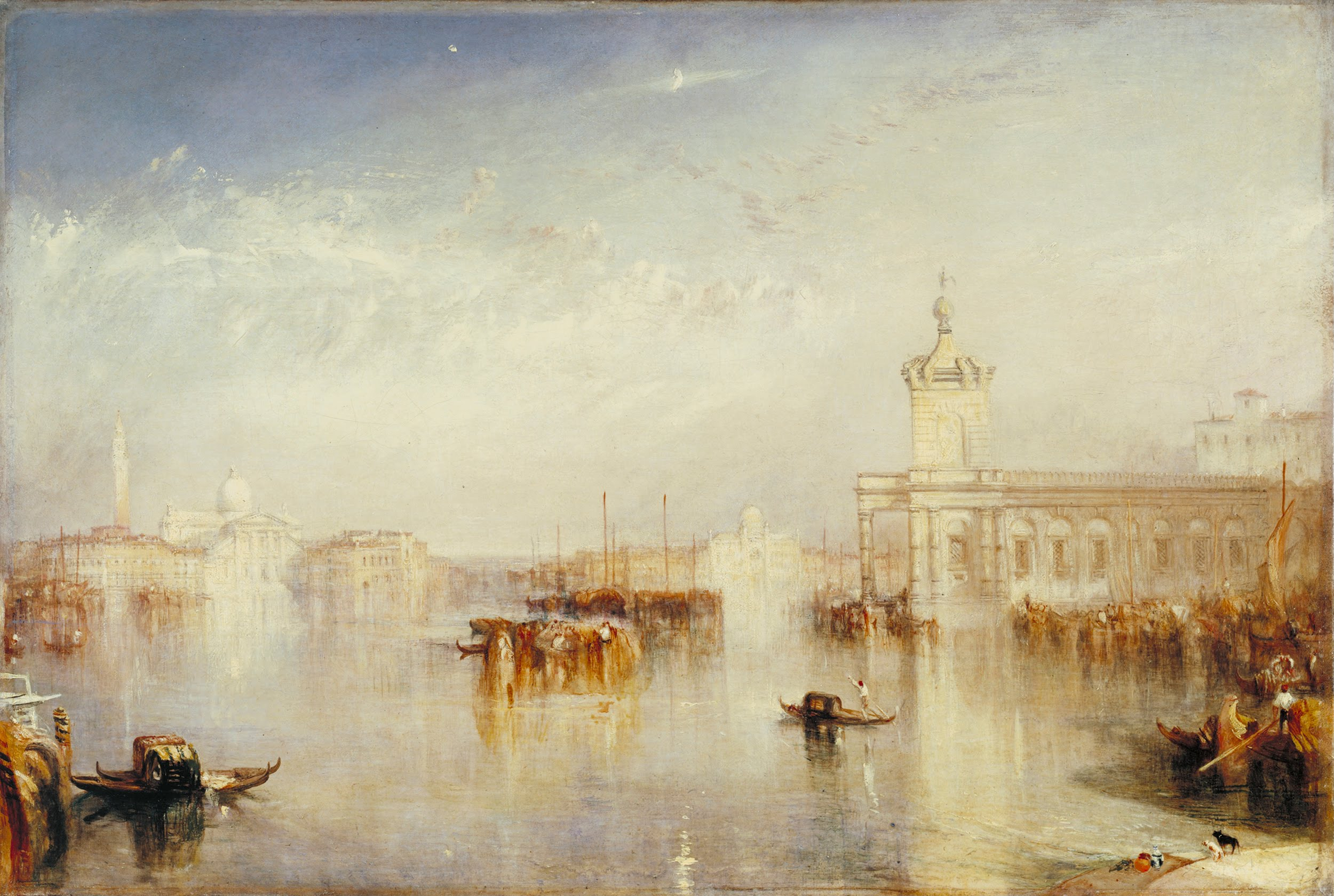
The Dogano, San Giorgio, Citella, from the Steps of the Europa by J.M.W. Turner

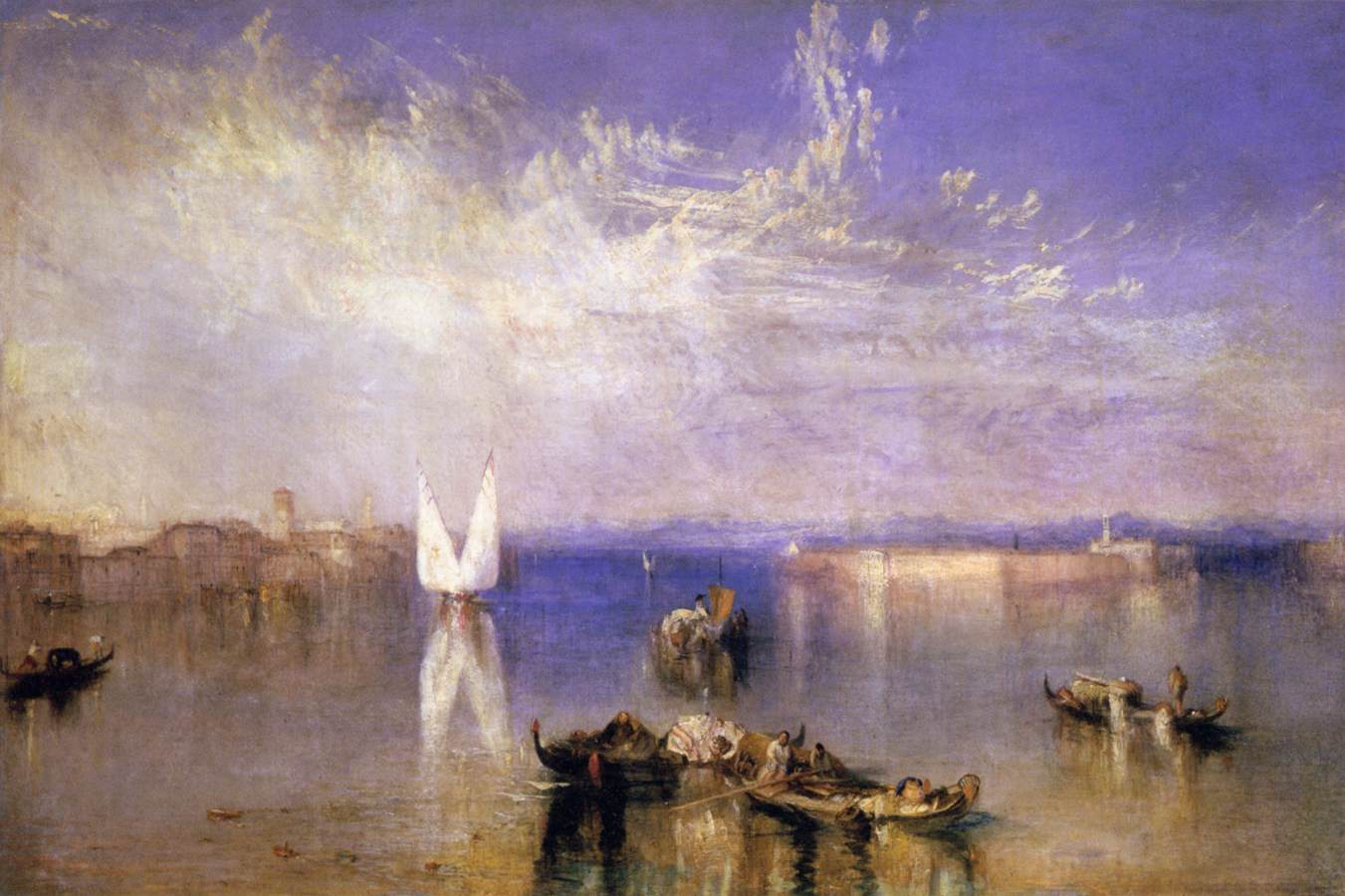
Campo Santo, Venice by J.M.W. Turner

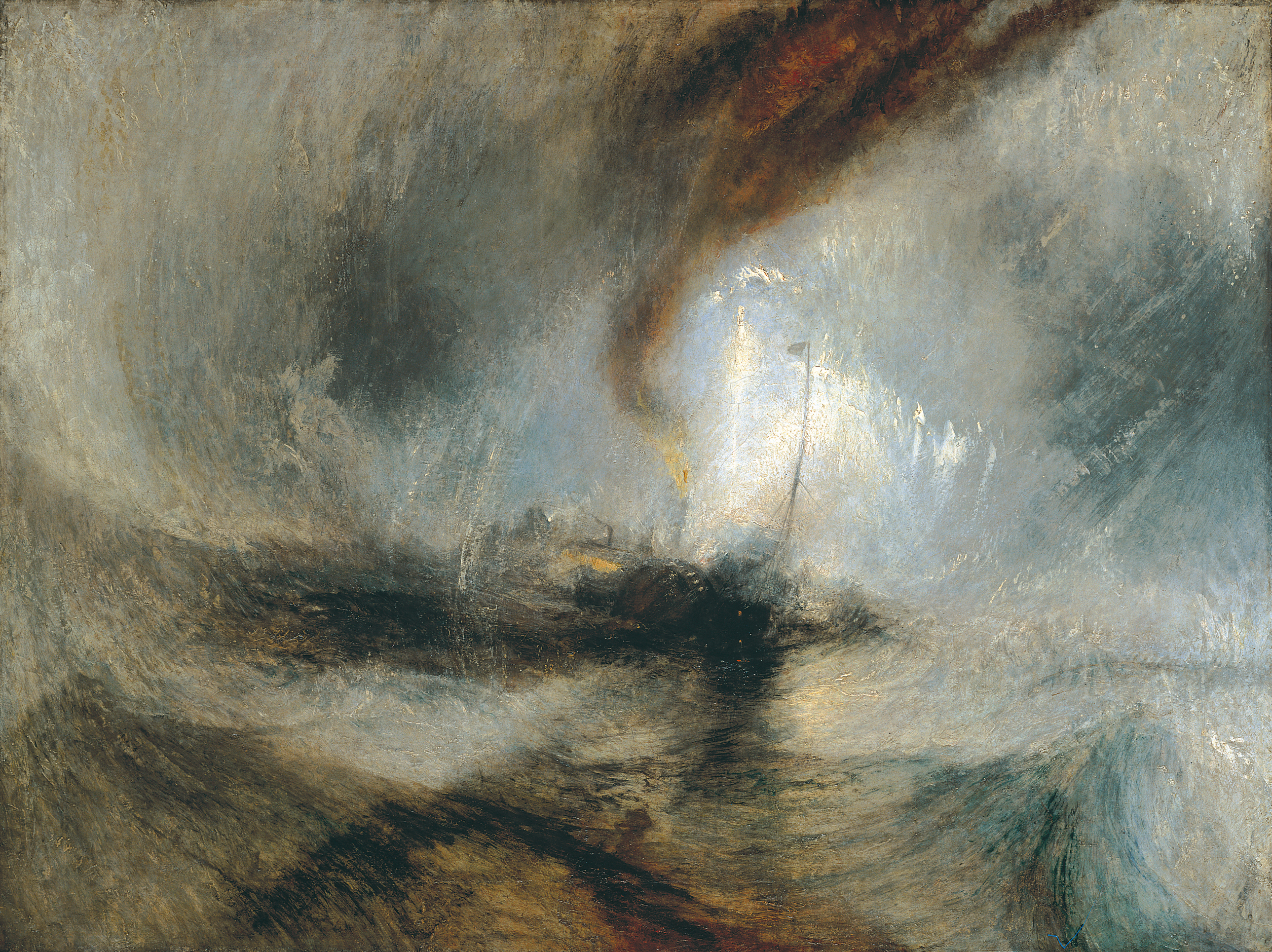
Snow Storm: Steam-Boat off a Harbour's Mouth by J.M.W. Turner

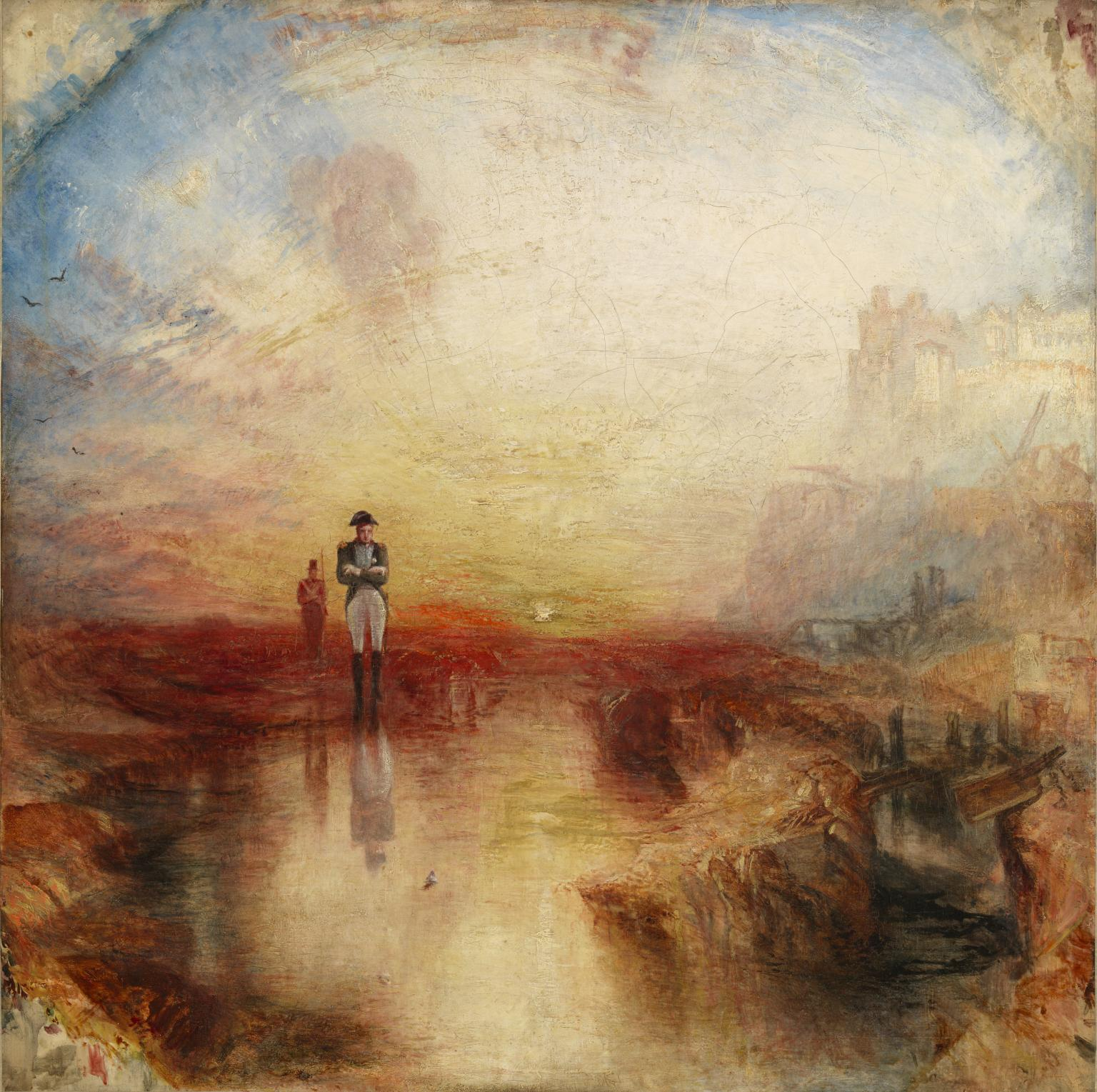
War. The Exile and the Rock Limpet by J.M.W. Turner

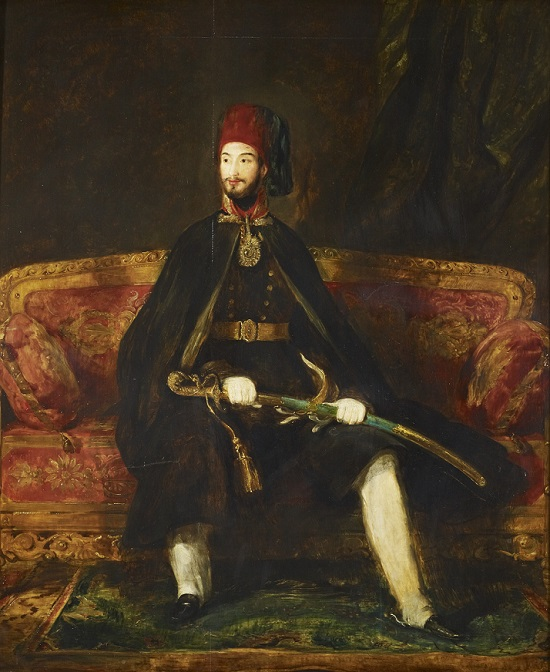
Portrait of Abdülmecid I by David Wilkie

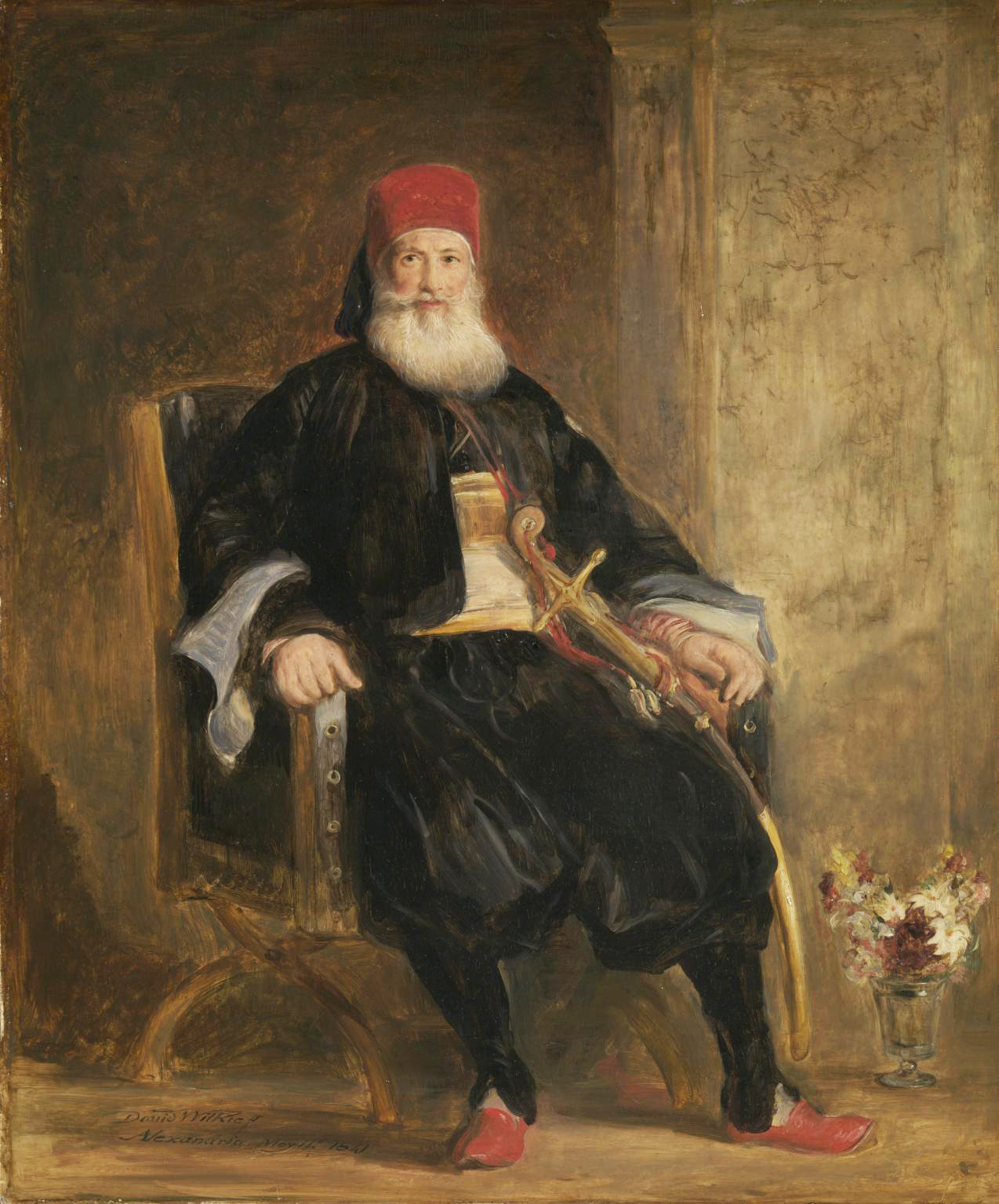
Portrait of Muhammad Ali of Egypt by David Wilkie

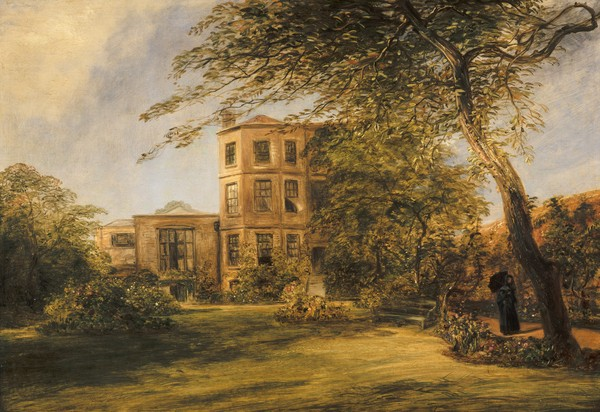
View of Sir David Wilkie's House in Kensington by William Collins

Sorrento, Bay of Naples by William Collins

Villa d'Este, Tivoli by William Collins

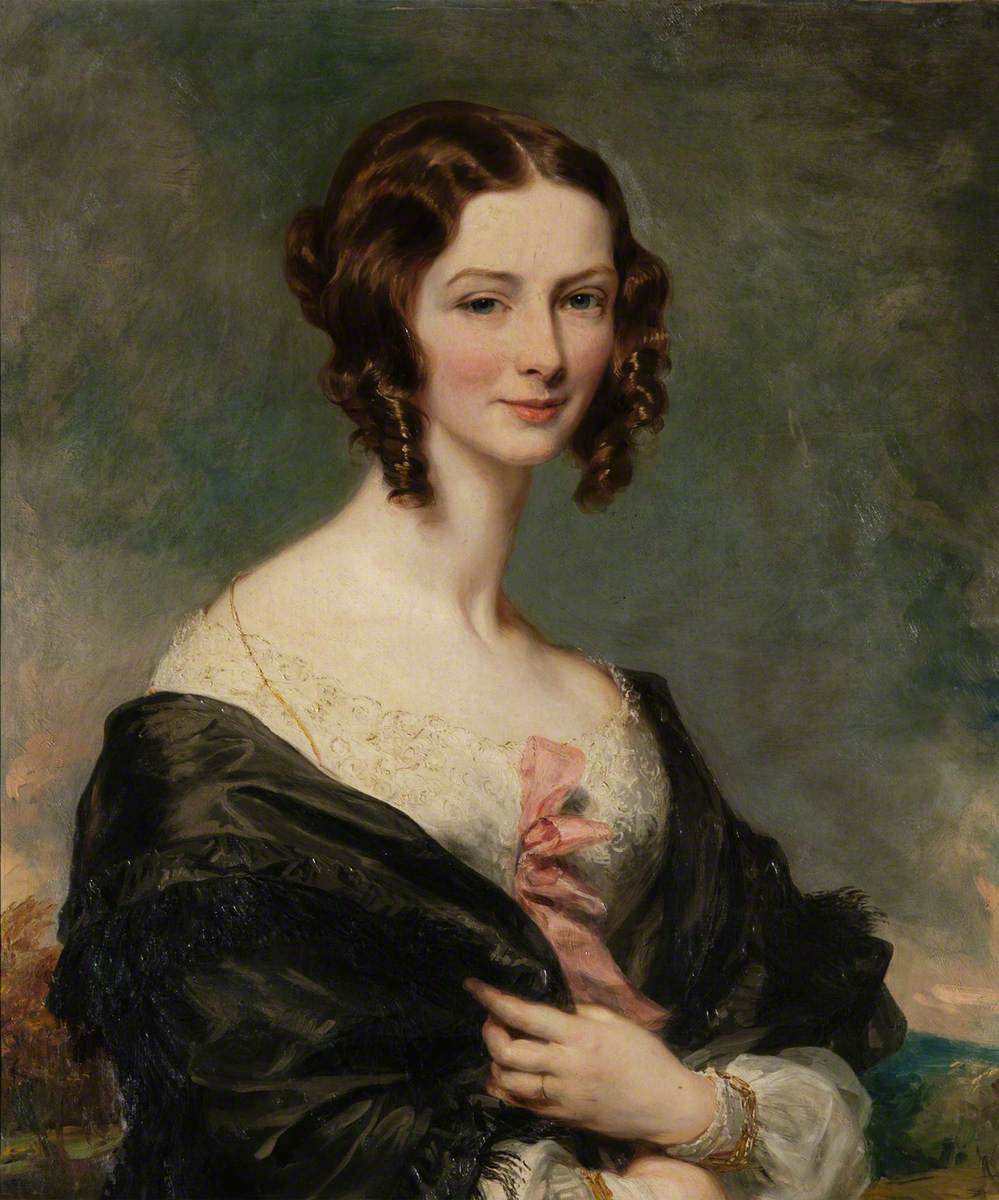
Portrait of Lady Haddo by Margaret Sarah Carpenter

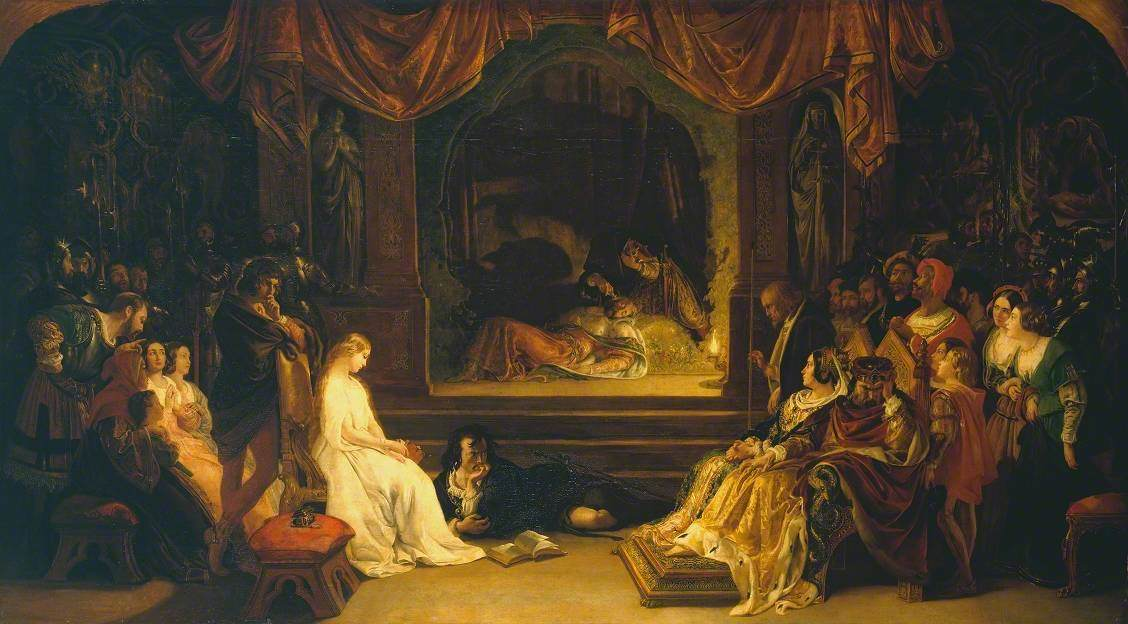
The Play Scene in Hamlet by Daniel Maclise

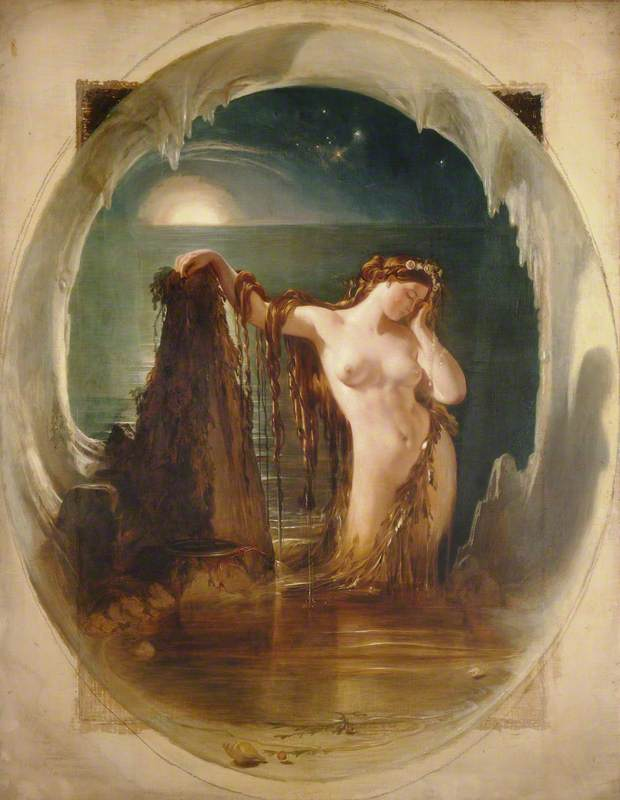
The Origin of the Harp by Daniel Maclise

Queen Katherine and Patience by Charles Robert Leslie

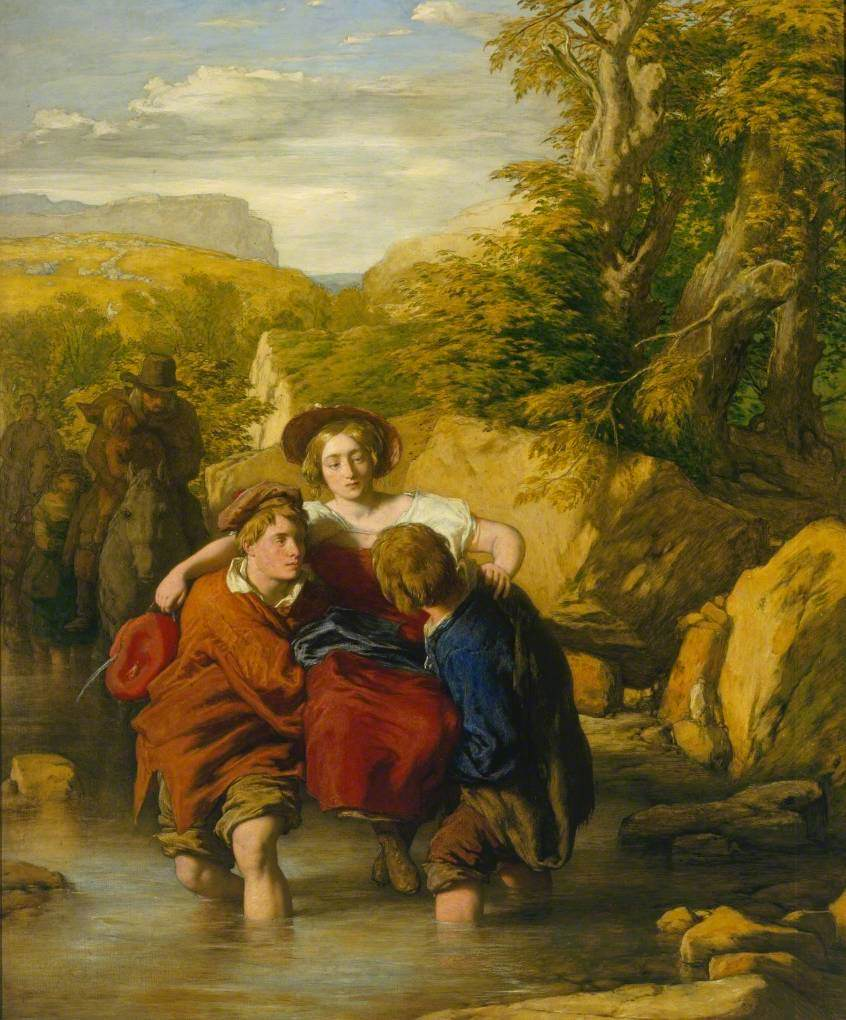
Crossing the Ford by William Mulready

The Village Schoolmaster by Charles West Cope

Ophelia Weaving Her Garlands by Richard Redgrave

Bad News from Sea by Richard Redgrave

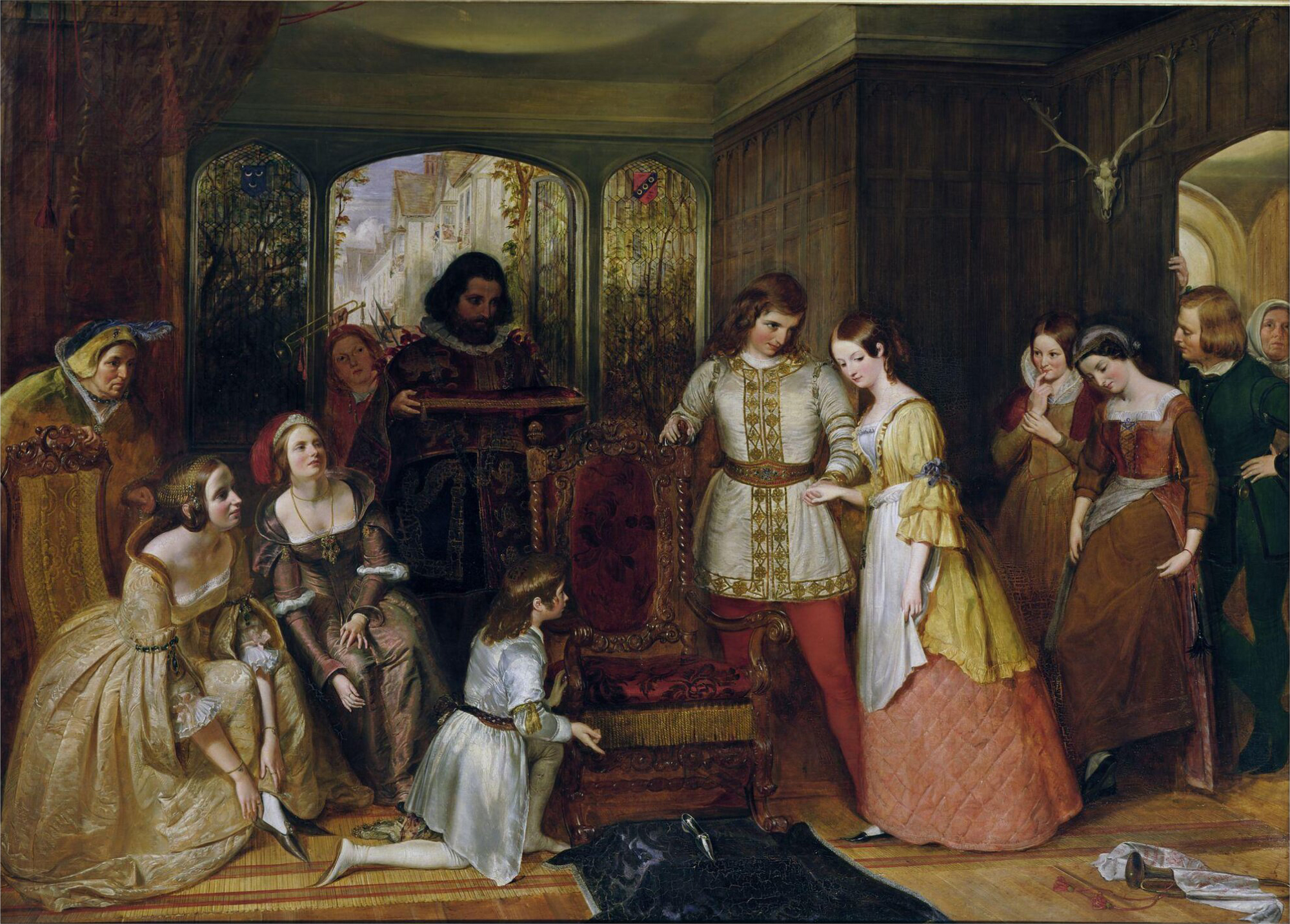
Cinderella About to Try on the Glass Slipper by Richard Redgrave

Measuring Heights by William Powell Frith

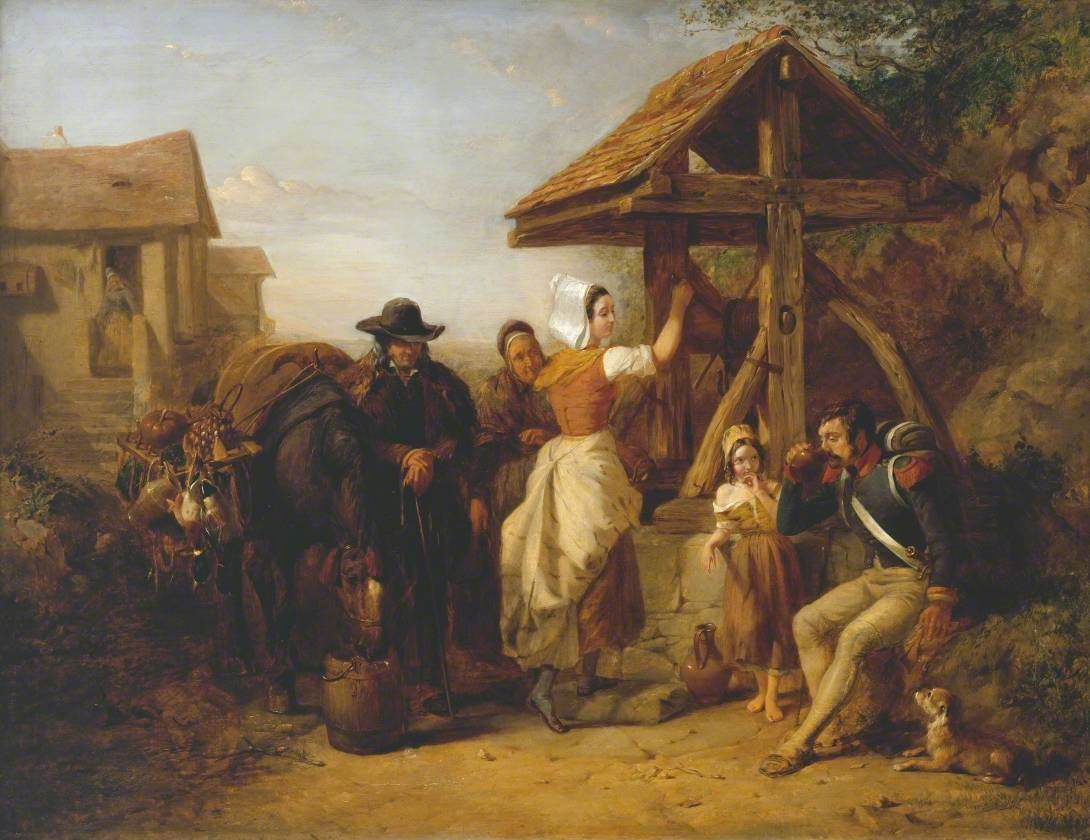
The Tired Soldier Resting at a Roadside Well by Frederick Goodall

The Departure of Charles II from Bentley in Staffordshire by Charles Landseer

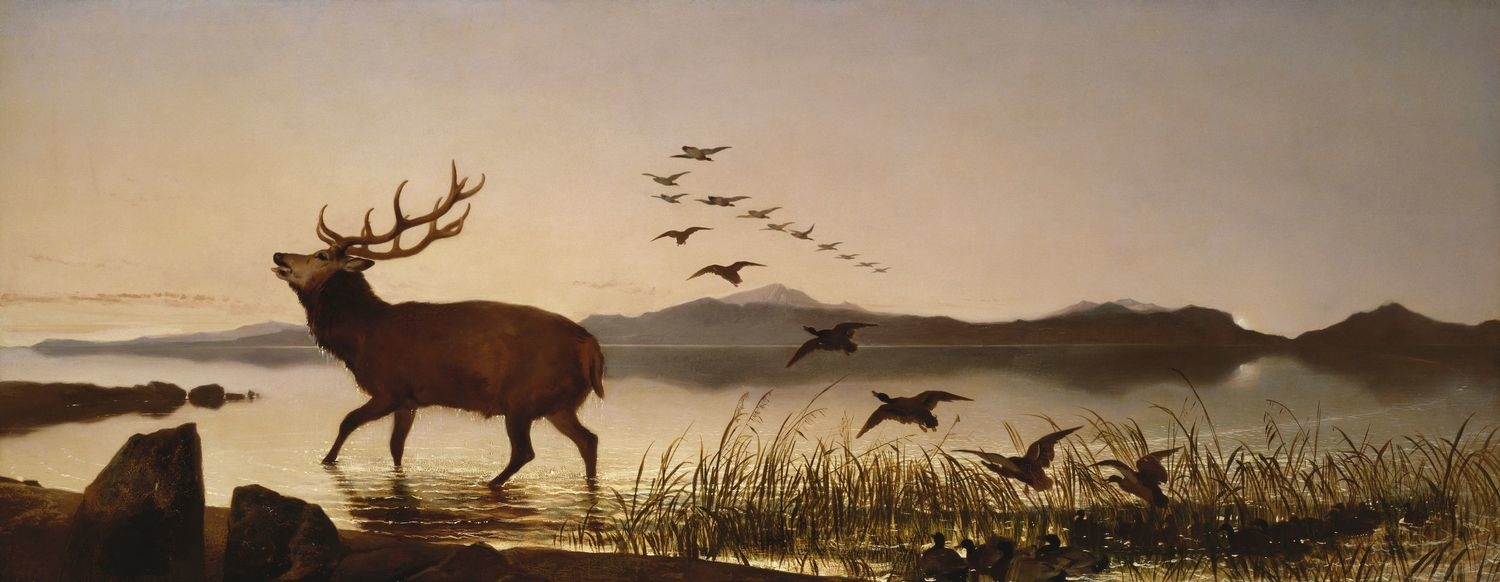
The Sanctuary by Edwin Landseer

A Highland Shepherd's Home by Edwin Landseer

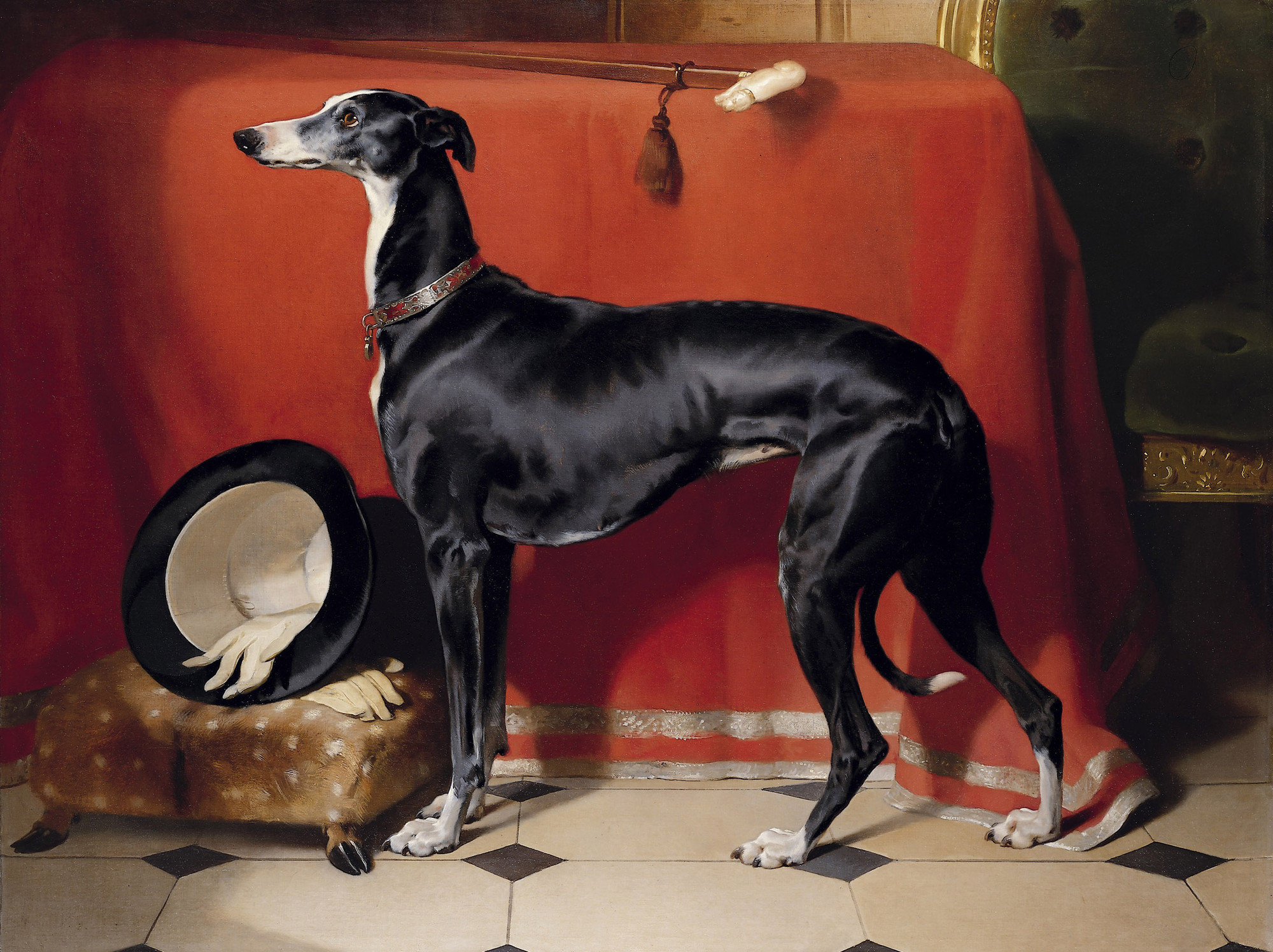
A Favourite Greyhound of Prince Albert by Edwin Landseer

Henry VI, Part Two, Act II, Scene 1 at St Albans by Edward Matthew Ward

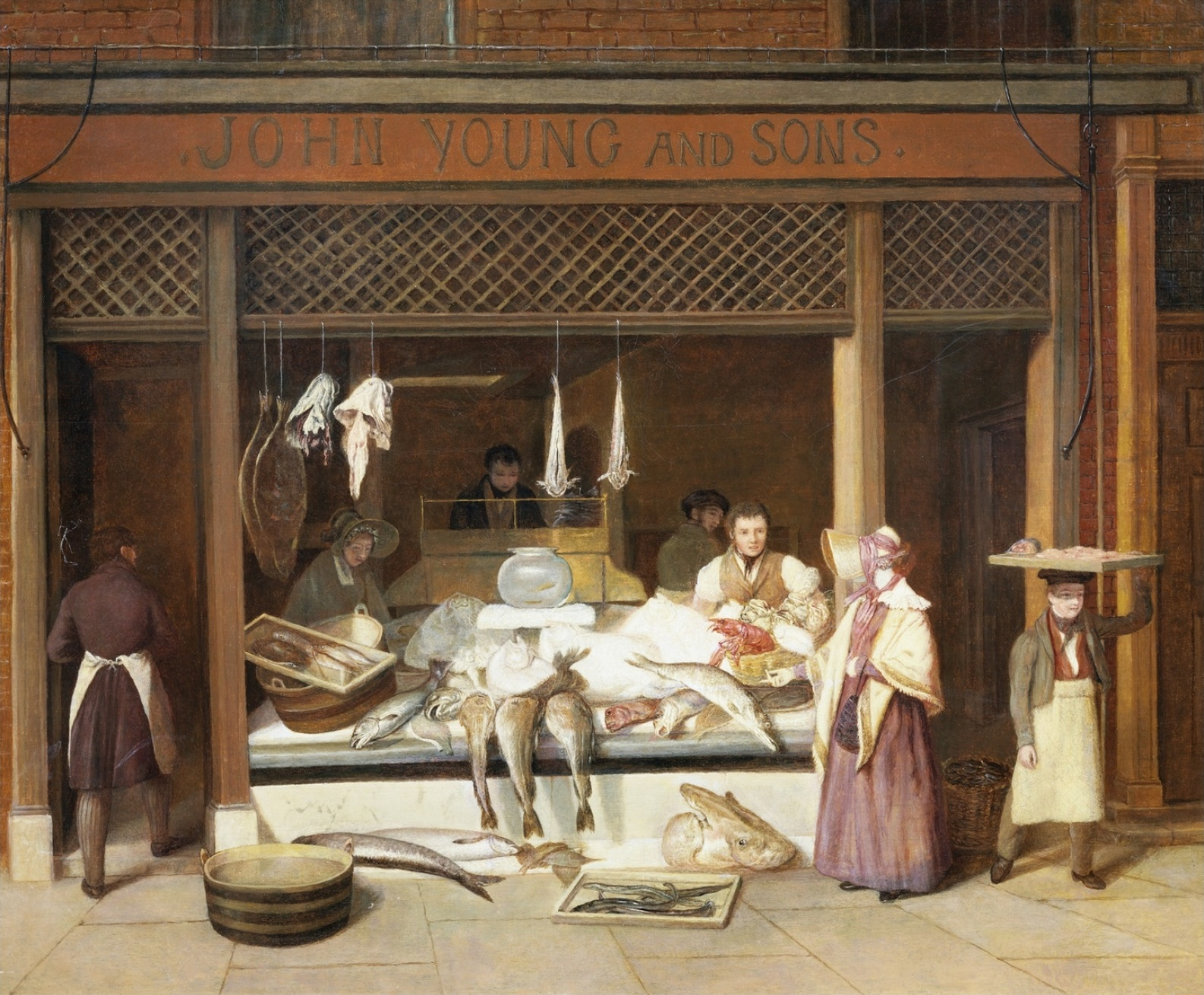
A Fishmonger's Shop by Jacques-Laurent Agasse

The Watering Place by Frederick Richard Lee

The Black Prince Thanking Lord James Audley for his Gallantry in the Battle of Poitiers by Benjamin Robert Haydon

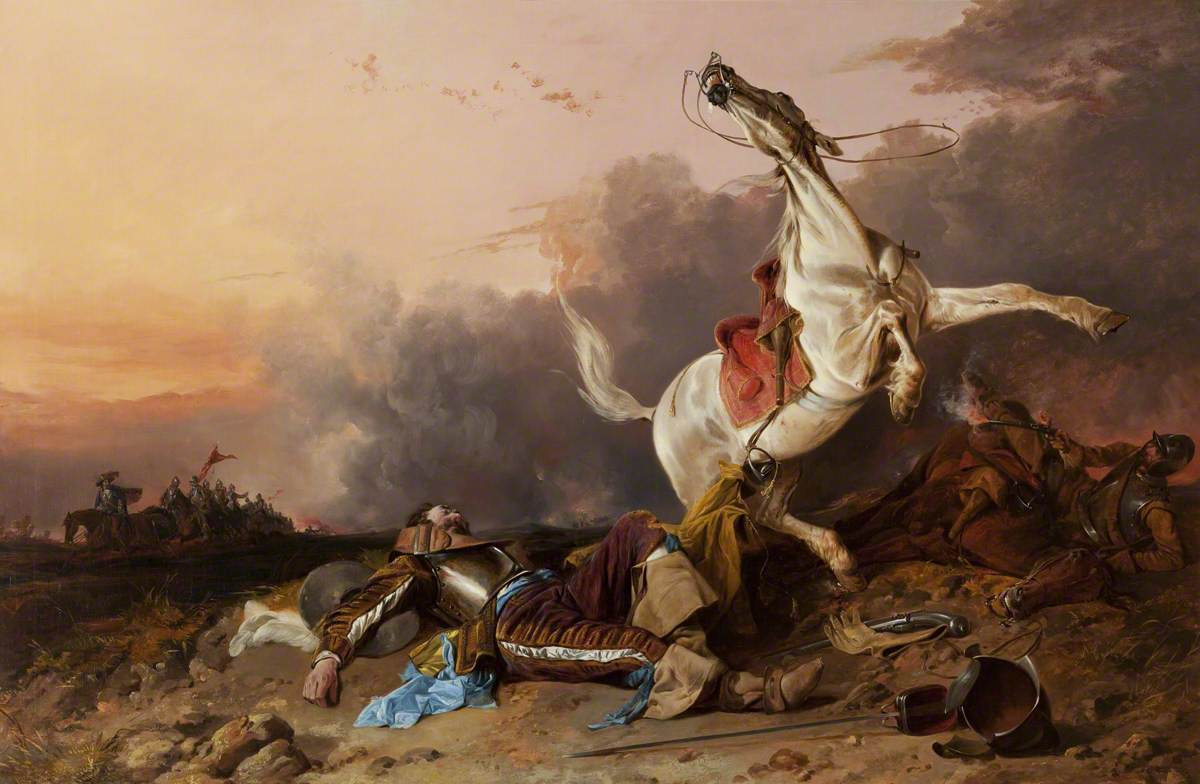
The Death of Sir William Lambton at the Battle of Marston Moor by Richard Ansdell

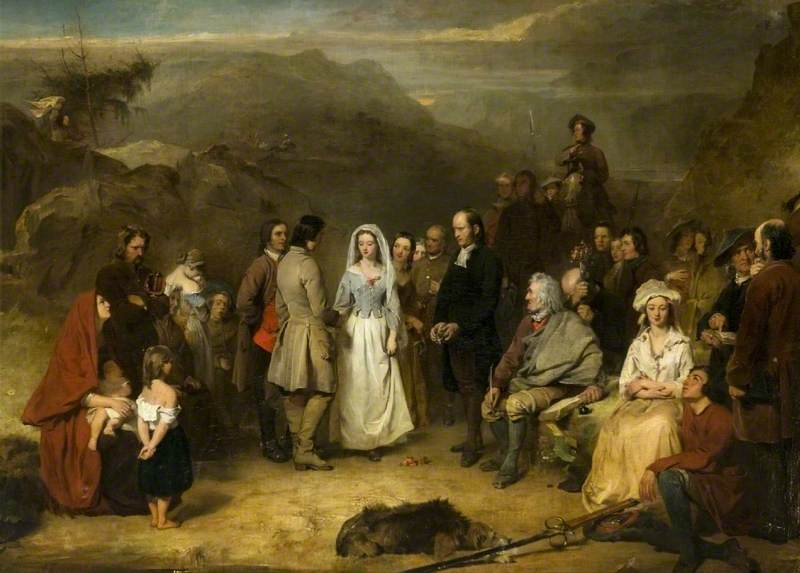
The Marriage of the Covenanter by Alexander Johnston

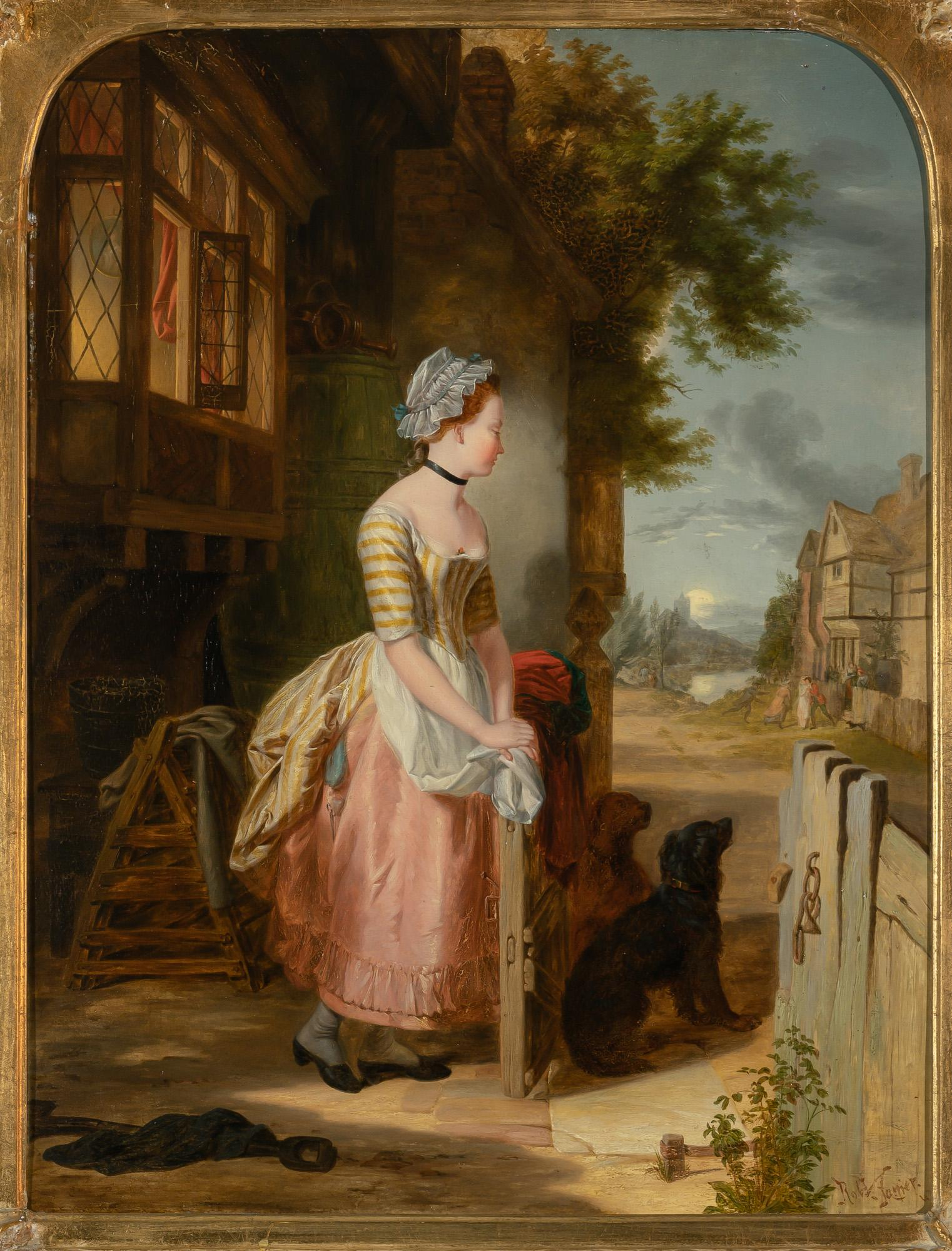
Floretta by Robert Farrier

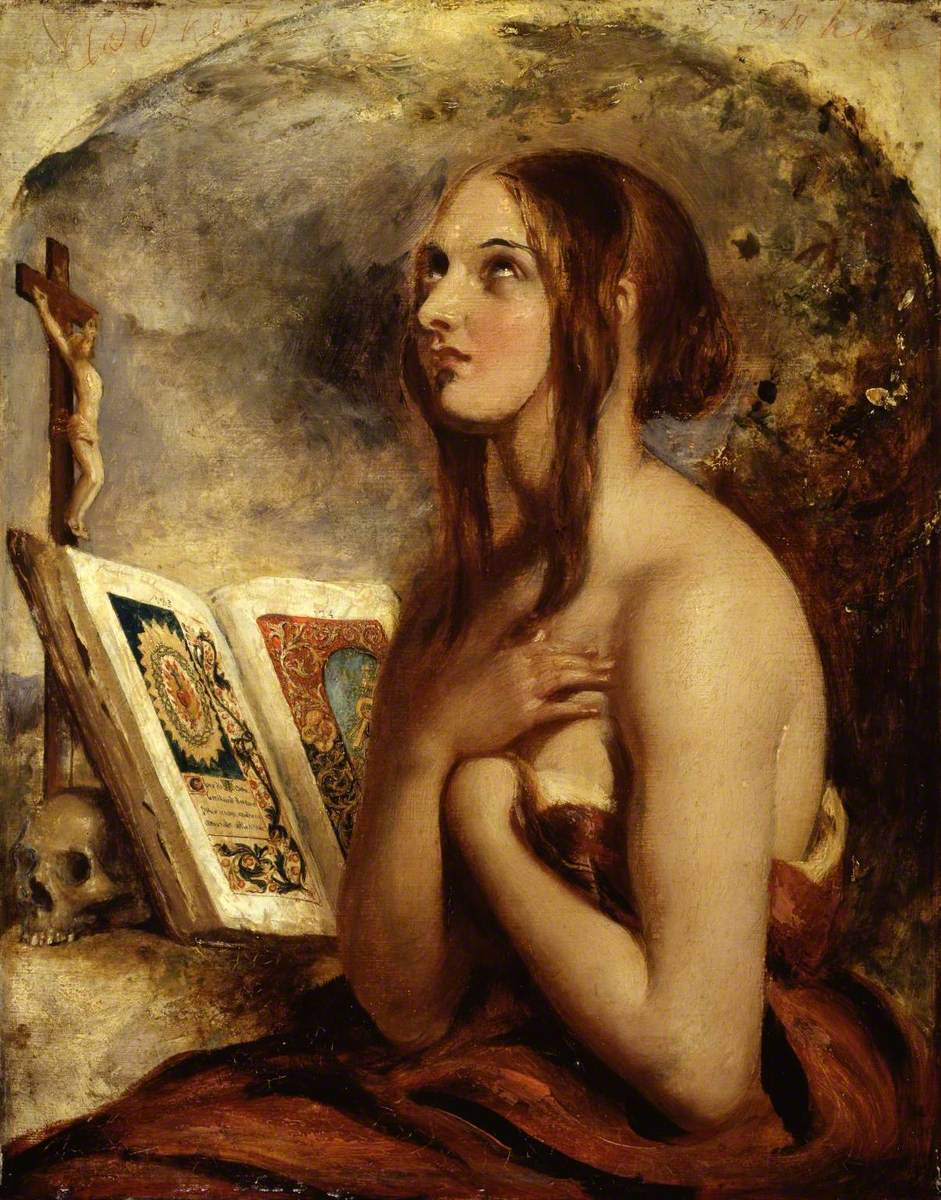
The Magdalen by William Etty

The Ravine Leading to Petra by David Roberts

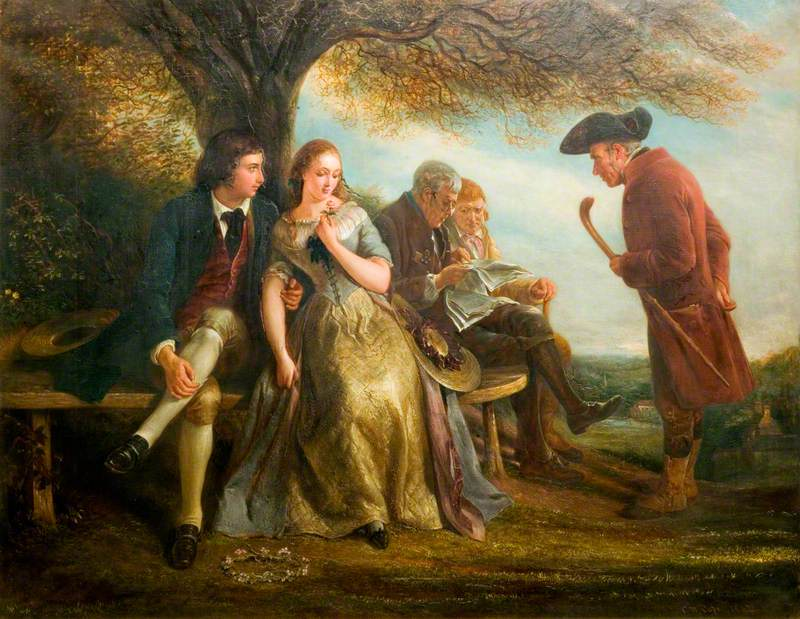
The Hawthorn Bush by Charles West Cope

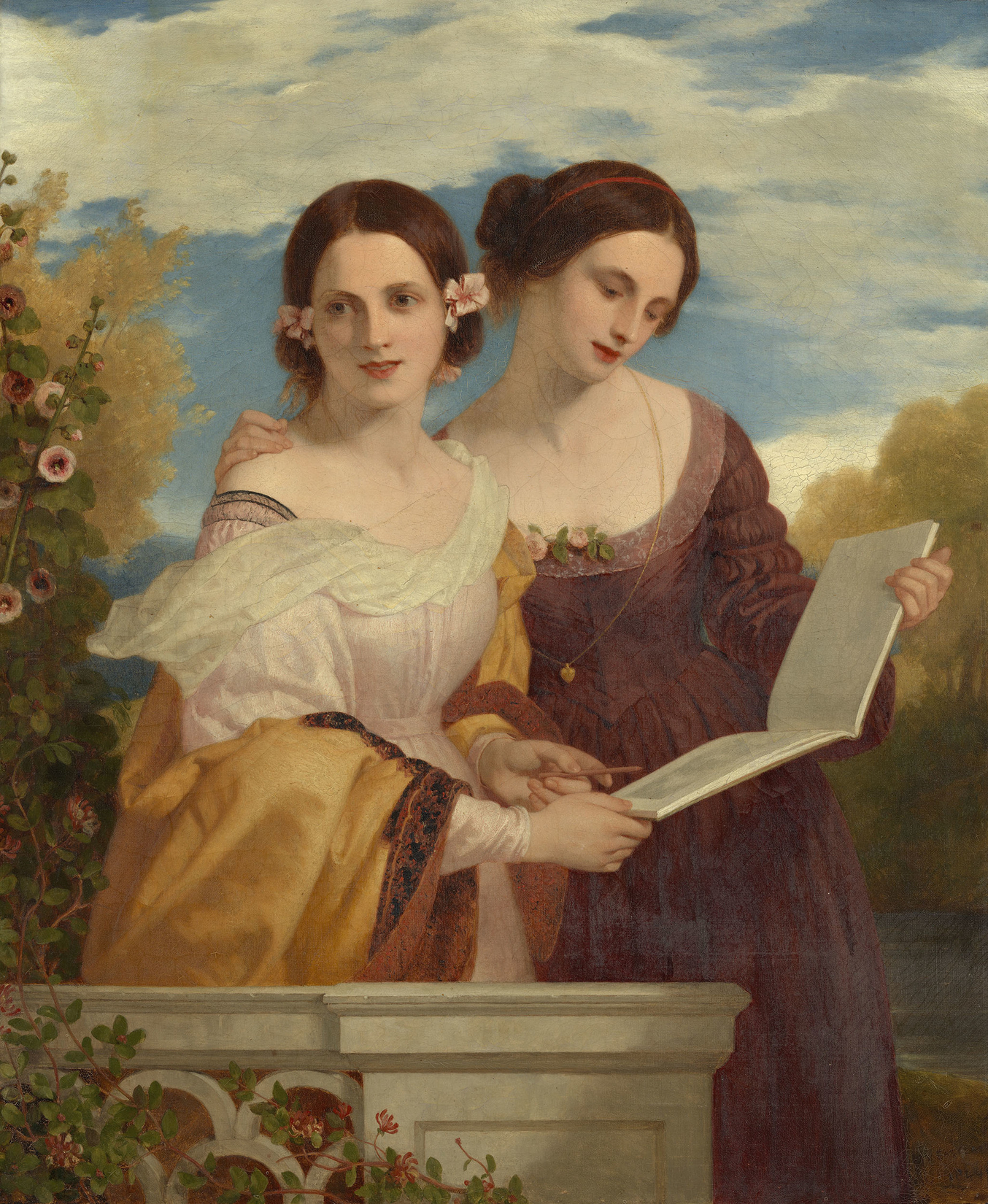
The Sisters by Charles Lock Eastlake

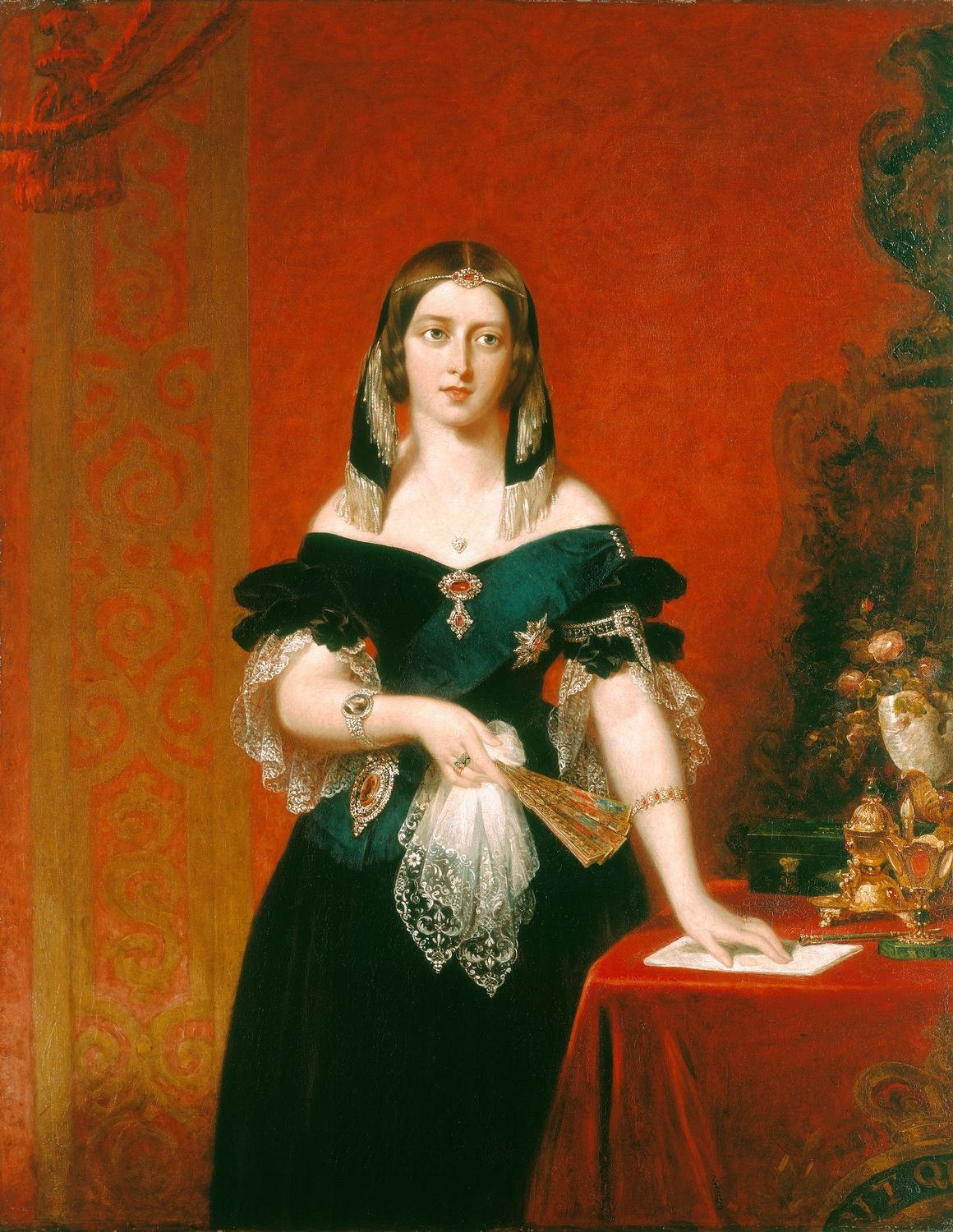
Portrait of Queen Victoria by John Partridge

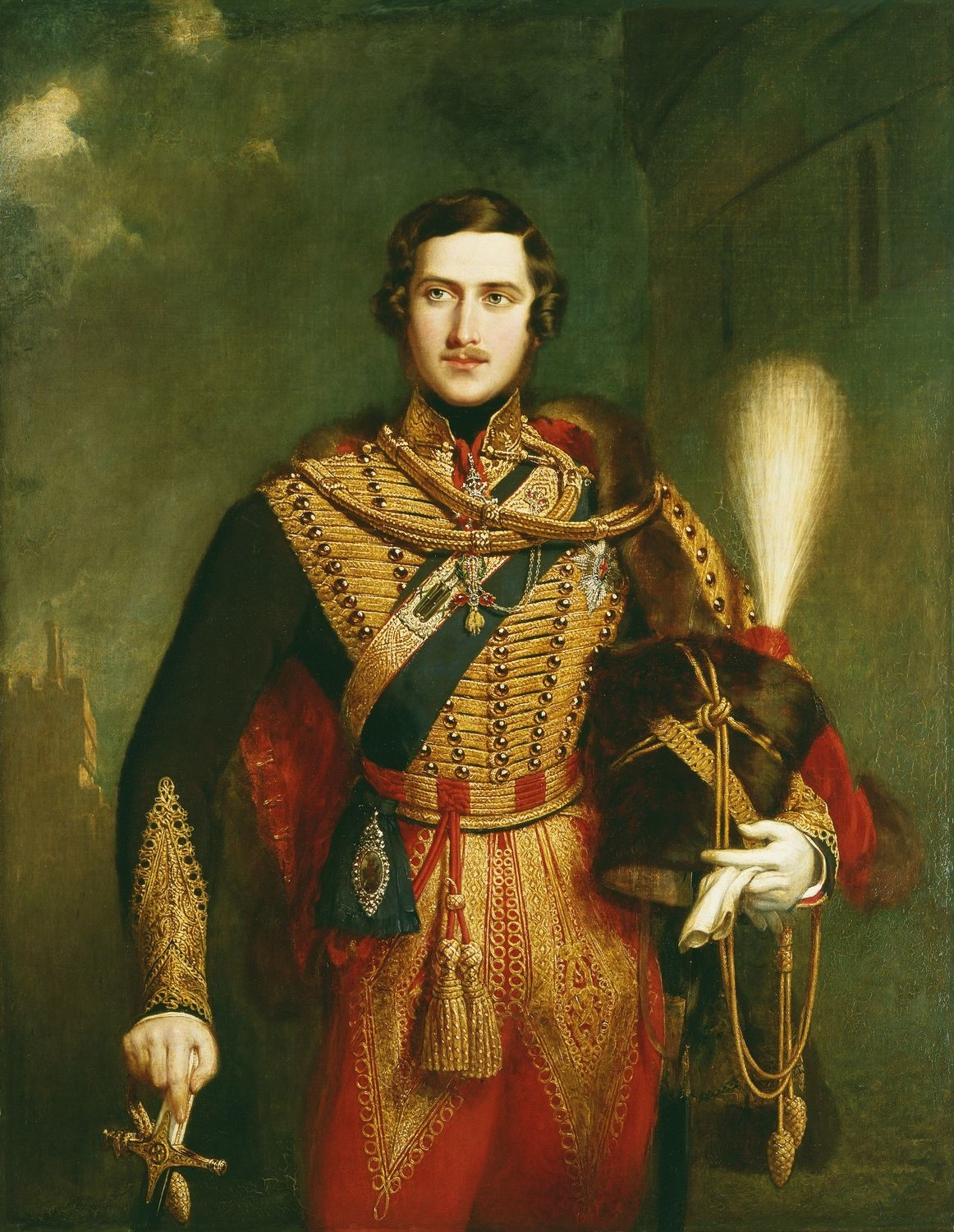
Portrait of Prince Albert by John Partridge

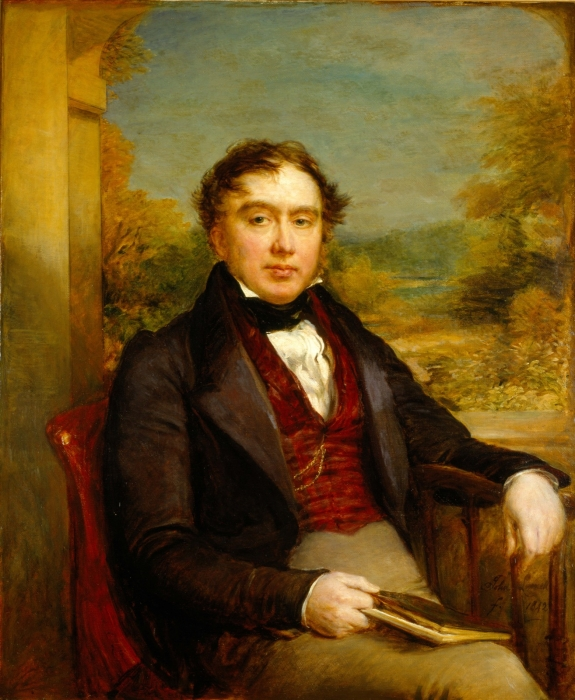
Portrait of Francis Baring by John Linnell

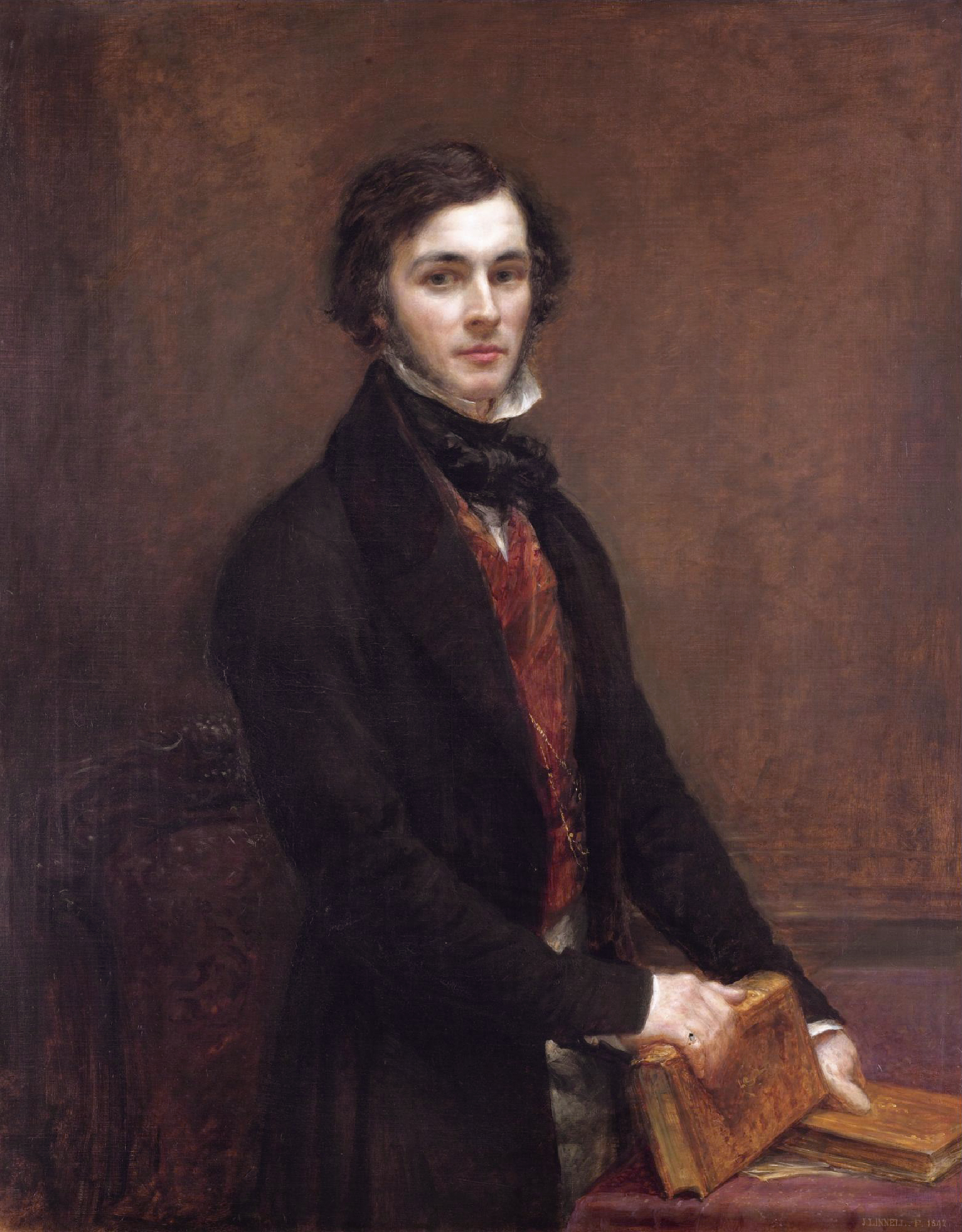
Portrait of William Coningham by John Linnell

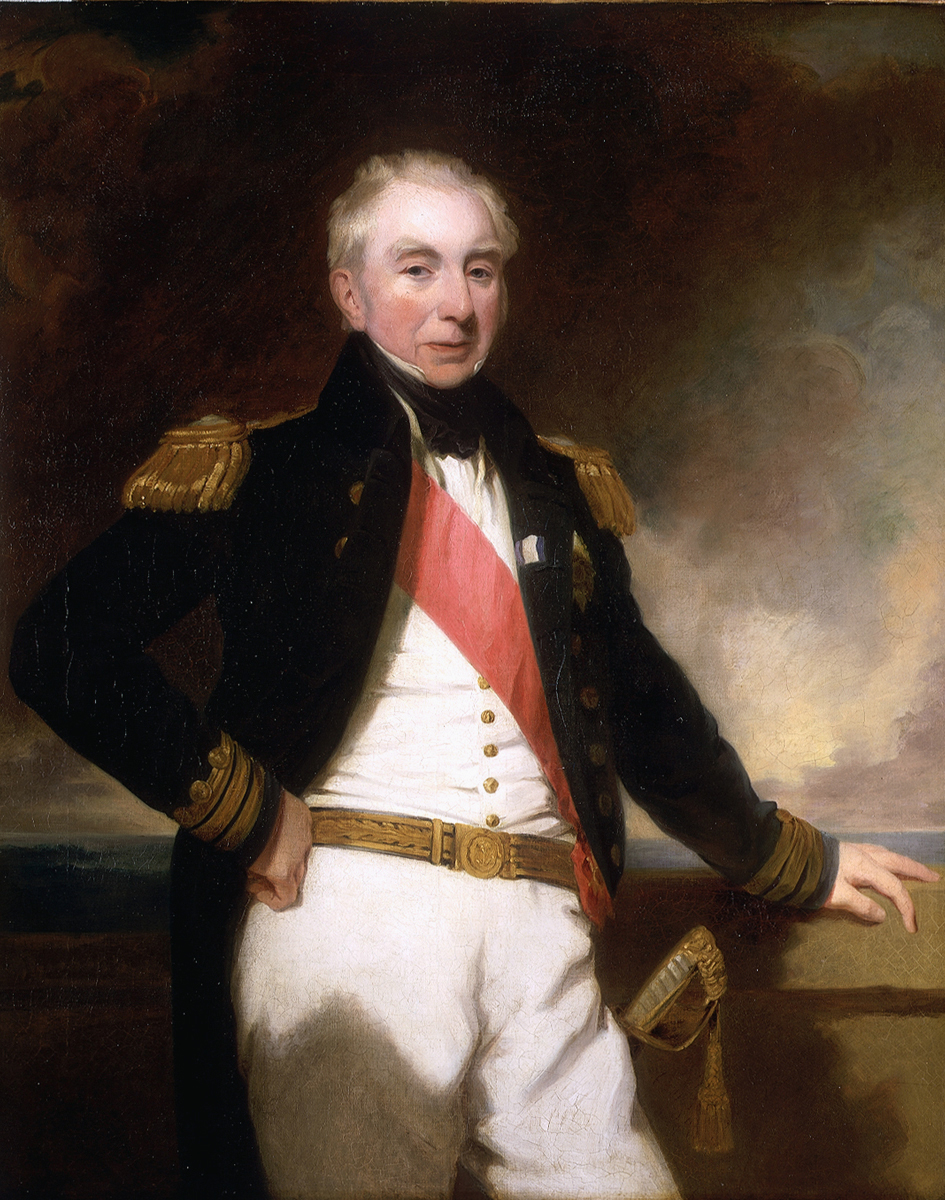
Portrait of Robert Stopford by Frederick Richard Say

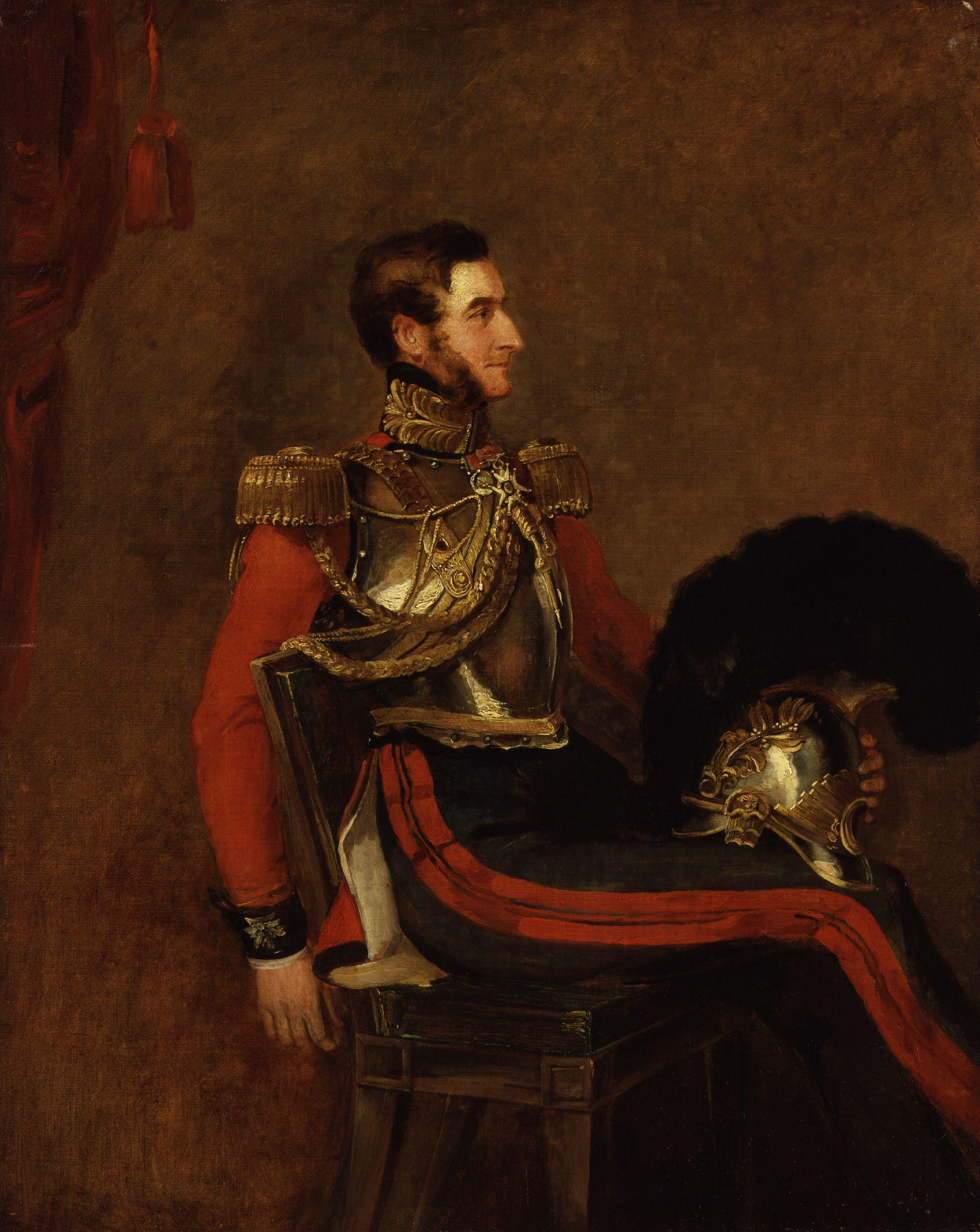
Portrait of Edward Pyndar Lygon by William Salter

Portrait of the Bishop of Chichester by Thomas Phillips

Portrait of Michael Faraday by Thomas Phillips

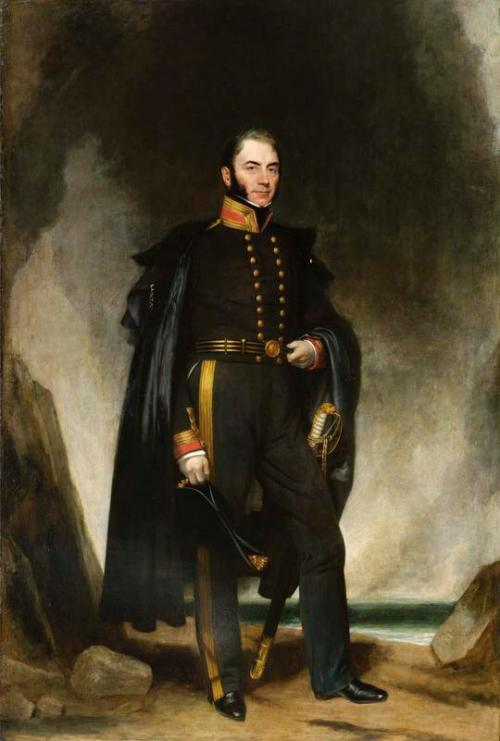
Portrait of William Gordon by Henry William Pickersgill

== See also ==
- Salon of 1842, held at the Louvre in Paris

== Bibliography ==
- Hamilton, James. Turner - A Life. Sceptre, 1998.
- Tromans, Nicholas. David Wilkie: The People's Painter. Edinburgh University Press, 2007.
