= Portrait of Abdülmecid I =

Painting by David Wilkie

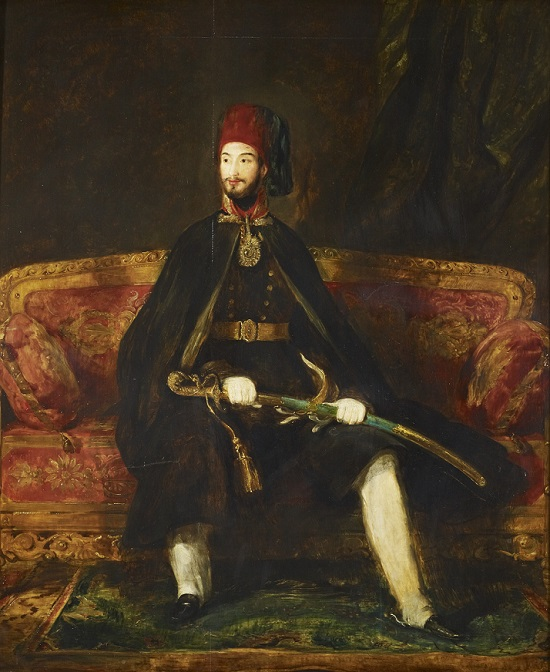
- Artist: David Wilkie
- Year: 1840
- Type: Oil on panel, portrait painting
- Dimensions: 70.2 cm × 58.7 cm (27.6 in × 23.1 in)
- Location: Royal Collection, Windsor Castle

Portrait of Abdülmecid I is an 1840 portrait painting by the British artist David Wilkie. It depicts Abdülmecid I, the seventeen year-old Sultan of the Ottoman Empire.

Wilkie travelled to the Middle East to paint scenes of the Holy Land. However, the outbreak of the Egyptian–Ottoman War meant he was largely confined to Constantinople. While in the Ottoman capital he produced his portrait of the young Sultan who had succeeded his father Mahmud II the previous year.

He presents the young Sultan in wearing dress uniform and a fez and the Order of Glory decoration. The painting was produced with the intention of presenting it to Queen Victoria. After Wilkie's death off Gibraltar during his journey home to Britain the following year, the Queen purchased the portrait. It appeared at the Royal Academy's Summer Exhibition of 1842 in London. Today the painting remains in the Royal Collection at Windsor Castle.

== See also ==
- Portrait of Muhammad Ali of Egypt, an 1841 painting by Wilkie of the ruler of Egypt

== Bibliography ==
- Beaulieu, Jill & Roberts, Mary. Orientalism's Interlocutors: Painting, Architecture, Photography. Duke University Press, 2002.
- Burritt, Amanda M. Visualising Britain’s Holy Land in the Nineteenth Century. Springer International, 2020.
- Flood, Finbarr Barry & Necipoglu, Gulru. A Companion to Islamic Art and Architecture. Wiley, 2017.
- Tromans, Nicholas. David Wilkie: The People's Painter. Edinburgh University Press, 2007.
