= The Dogana, San Giorgio, Citella, from the Steps of the Europa =

Painting by J. M. W. Turner

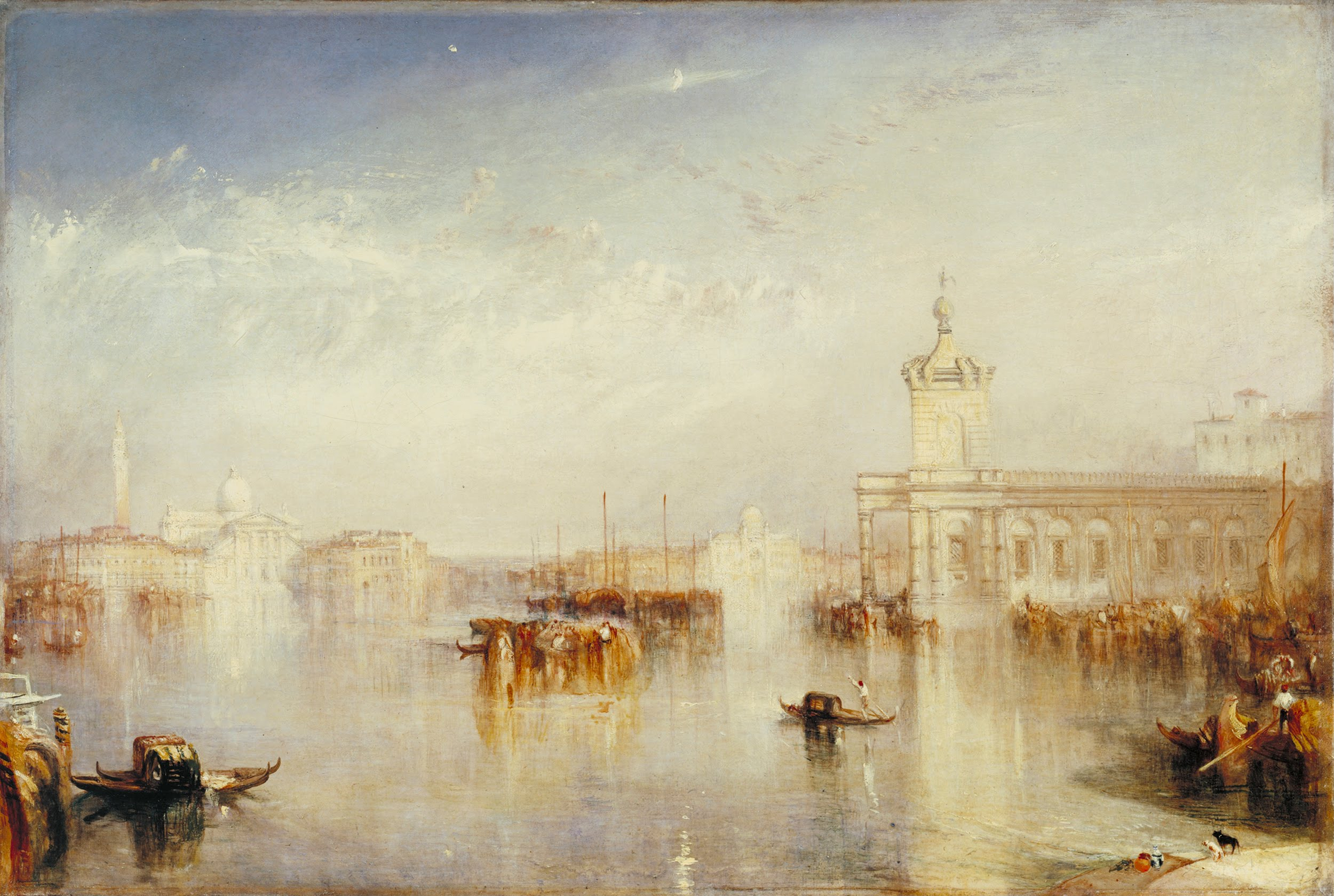
- Artist: J. M. W. Turner
- Year: 1842
- Type: Oil on canvas, landscape painting
- Dimensions: 61.6 cm × 92.7 cm (24.3 in × 36.5 in)
- Location: Tate Britain, London
- Website: www.tate.org.uk/...n00372

The Dogana, San Giorgio, Citella, from the Steps of the Europa is an oil on canvas landscape painting by the British artist J.M.W. Turner, from 1842.

== History ==
It features a panorama of central Venice, then part of the Austrian Empire, which was a popular subject for Turner and other British painters such as Clarkson Stanfield and Edward William Cooke during the period. It depicts a view from the Hotel Europa where Turner sometimes stayed during his visits. The work was displayed at the Royal Academy Exhibition of 1842 at the National Gallery in London. The painting was acquired by the art collector Robert Vernon the same year and was donated to the nation in 1847 as part of the Vernon Gift. It is now in the collection of the Tate Britain in Pimlico.

== See also ==
- List of paintings by J. M. W. Turner

== Bibliography ==
- Ackroyd, Peter. J.M.W. Turner. Vintage, 2006.
- Bailey, Anthony. J.M.W. Turner: Standing in the Sun. Tate Enterprises Ltd, 2013.
- Costello, Leo. J.M.W. Turner and the Subject of History. Routledge, 2017.
- Finberg, Alexander Joseph. In Venice with Turner. Cotswold Gallery, 1930.
- Hamilton, James. Turner - A Life. Sceptre, 1998.
- Reynolds, Graham. Turner. Thames & Hudson, 2022.
