= Ophelia Weaving Her Garlands =

Painting by Richard Redgrave

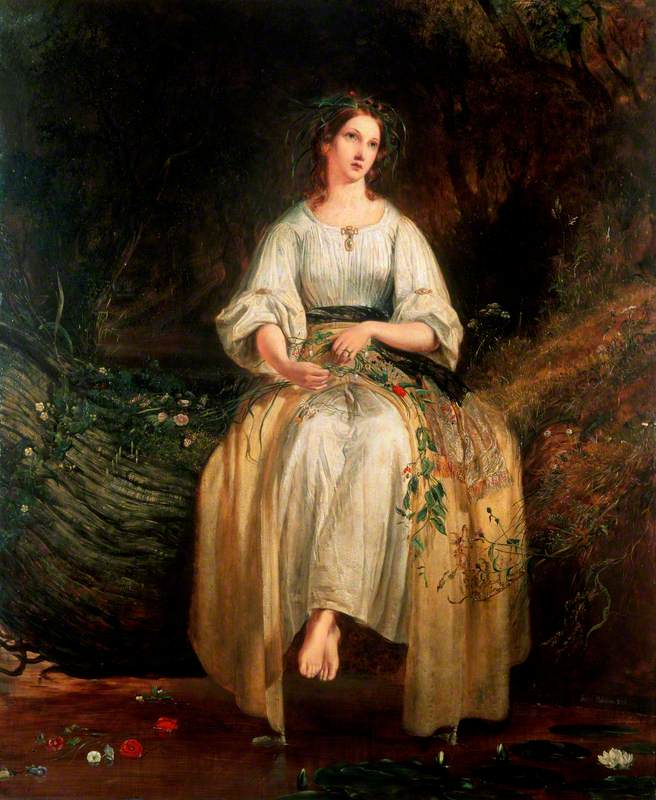
- Artist: Richard Redgrave
- Year: 1842
- Type: Oil on panel, history painting
- Dimensions: 76.2 cm × 63.5 cm (30.0 in × 25.0 in)
- Location: Victoria and Albert Museum, London

Ophelia Weaving Her Garlands is an 1842 oil painting by the British artist Richard Redgrave. It shows Ophelia from William Shakespeare's tragedy Hamlet. Depicted as madness has overcome her, she is shown creating a garland. The painting includes over thirty different types of flower.

The painting was displayed at the Royal Academy Exhibition of 1842 at the National Gallery, where it was hung near Daniel Maclise's The Play Scene in Hamlet. Today the work is in the collection of the Victoria and Albert Museum in South Kensington, having been gifted by John Sheepshanks in 1857 as part of the large Sheepshanks Gift.

== See also ==
- Sheepshanks Gift

== Bibliography ==
- Rhodes, Kimberly. Ophelia and Victorian Visual Culture: Representing Body Politics in the Nineteenth Century. Routledge, 2017.
- Sanabria, Carolina. Ophelia Through Time: Reimaginings in Art and Film. Cambridge Scholars Publishing, 2025.
- Young, Alan R. Hamlet and the Visual Arts, 1709-1900. University of Delaware Press, 2002.
