= Crossing the Ford =

Painting by William Mulready

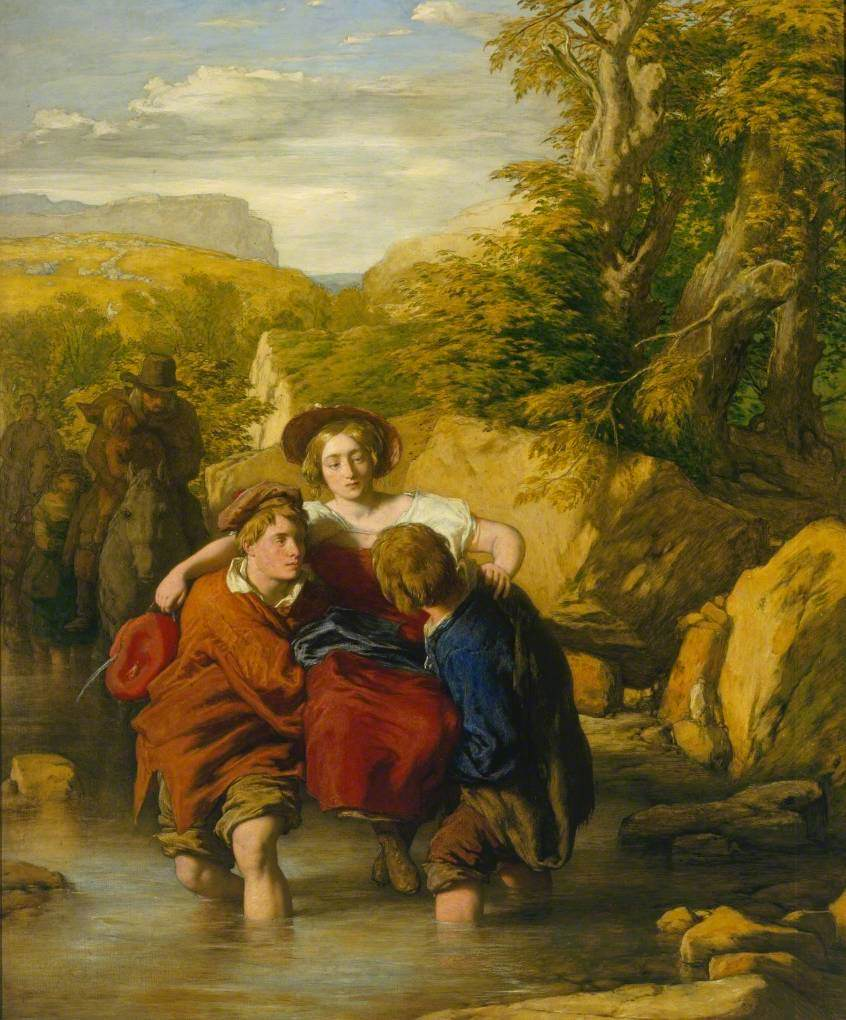
- Artist: William Mulready
- Year: 1842
- Type: Oil on mahogany, genre painting
- Dimensions: 60.6 cm × 50.2 cm (23.9 in × 19.8 in)
- Location: Tate Britain, London

Crossing the Ford is an oil on canvas genre painting by the Irish artist William Mulready, from 1842. It is held at the Tate Britain, in London.

== History and description ==
The painting depicts a scene where two young men are carrying a woman across a ford somewhere in rural England. It suggests that she might be choosing which of the two suitors to make a future with. Two men riding horses and a woman on foot are following behind her. The painting was displayed at the Royal Academy's Summer Exhibition of 1842 at the National Gallery in Trafalgar Square where it was one of the most popular works on display.

== Provenance ==
Today it is in the collection of the Tate Britain, having been given to the nation by the art collector Robert Vernon, in 1847, who had bought the work from the artist for 600 guineas.

== Bibliography ==
- Mitchell, Sally (ed.) Victorian Britain: An Encyclopedia. Routledge, 2011.
- Rorimer, Anne. Drawings by William Mulready. Victoria and Albert Museum, 1972.
- Wright, Christopher, Gordon, Catherine May & Smith, Mary Peskett. British and Irish Paintings in Public Collections: An Index of British and Irish Oil Paintings by Artists Born Before 1870 in Public and Institutional Collections in the United Kingdom and Ireland. Yale University Press, 2006.
