= View of Sir David Wilkie's House in Kensington =

Painting by William Collins

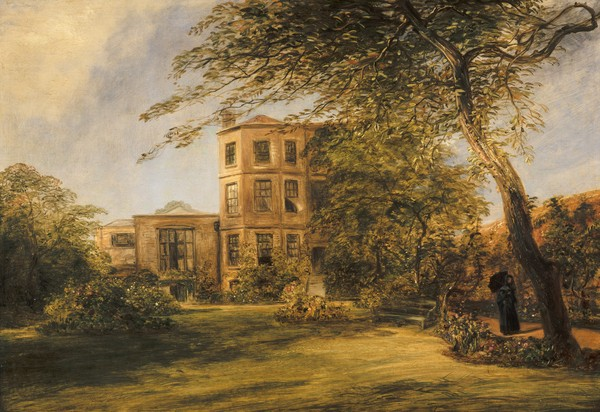
- Artist: William Collins
- Year: 1842
- Type: Oil on panel, landscape painting
- Dimensions: 35 cm × 50.8 cm (14 in × 20.0 in)
- Location: Scottish National Gallery, Edinburgh

View of Sir David Wilkie's House in Kensington is an 1842 oil painting by the British artist William Collins. It features a view from the back garden of the house of the Scottish painter David Wilkie at Vicarage Place in Kensington. Wilkie had died the previous year at sea off Gibraltar returning from a trip to the Middle East.

The woman in mourning dress on the right may be Wilkie's sister Helen, to whom Collins gave the picture. He and Wilkie were very close friends and Collins and his family lived close by in Porchester Terrace in Bayswater, having moved there from Hampstead at Wilkie's suggestion. His eldest son the writer Wilkie Collins was named after the artist. The painting was displayed as a tribute to Wilkie at the Royal Academy Exhibition of 1842 held at the National Gallery in London. It was auctioned by Christie's in 2007. Today it is in the collection of the Scottish National Gallery in Edinburgh.

== See also ==
- Peace – Burial at Sea, J.M.W. Turner's tribute to Wilkie which was also displayed at the 1842 exhibition

== Bibliography ==
- Gasson, Andrew & Peters, Catherine. Wilkie Collins: An Illustrated Guide. Oxford University Press, 1998.
- Tromans, Nicholas. David Wilkie: The People's Painter. Edinburgh University Press, 2007.
