= Peace Burial at Sea =

English post-rock band

Peace Burial At Sea
- Origin: Hexham, Northumberland and Newcastle, North East England
- Genres: Post-rock, post-hardcore, electronic, electronicore
- Years active: 2003–2007, 2020
- Labels: Mekong Delta, Captains of Industry, Ghostwritten Recordings
- Members: Jonny Longrigg (guitar / vocals); Alex Cole (drums); John Harrison (bass); Rob Barker (synth / laptop)
- Website: peaceburialatsea.bandcamp.com

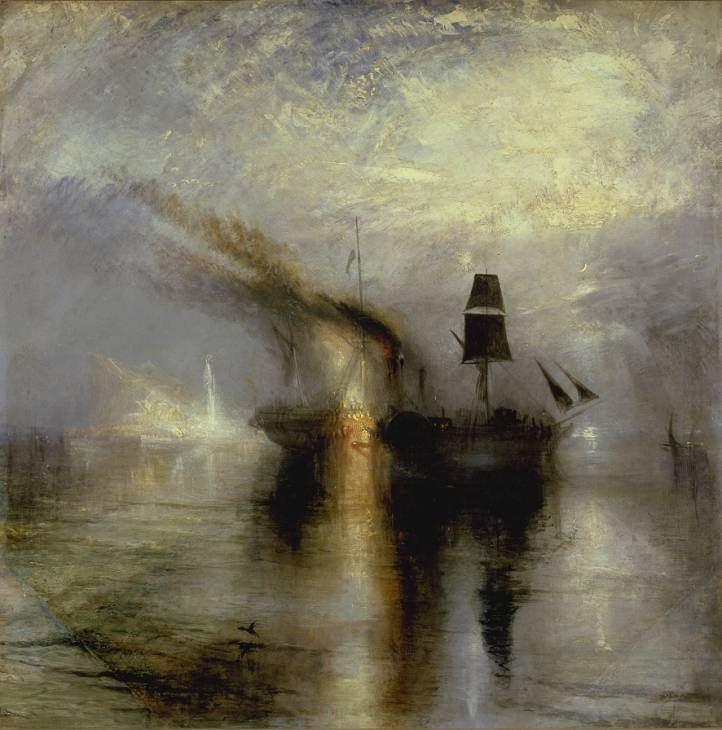
Peace – Burial at Sea (1842), a painting of a burial at sea by J. M. W. Turner

Peace Burial At Sea are a Newcastle upon Tyne-based four-piece post-rock band which combine elements of post-hardcore with electronic textures, incorporating lyrical themes inspired by Soviet propaganda, horror films, science fiction, and the occult. Their name was inspired by J. M. W. Turner's 1842 painting of a similar name.

The band originated in Hexham, Northumberland, and released their debut album, This Is Such A Quiet Town, in 2003. An eponymously-titled second album was released in 2006. A digital-only EP containing the album track "Czarina Catherine" was also released (date unknown), which included two other songs that do not appear elsewhere: "Easy Meat for Faceless Men" and "This is a Godless Town."

The band's early music was well-received, with reviews for their first album including a rating of 'KKKK' from Kerrang!, a 4* "Excellent" review in Sputnik Music, and Ian Fletcher of Plan B magazine calling it "a crushing crescendo of enthralling quiet/loud dynamics". Their second album was described by Drowned in Sound as "one of the undiscovered greats of its kind", and a review in Plan B likened the group to The Auteurs.

They played across the UK with bands such as 65daysofstatic and Hell is for Heroes. Their music received national airplay on BBC Radio from DJs such as John Peel, Zane Lowe, and Steve Lamacq.

The band split up in 2007, and announced their last gig with characteristic self-deprecation: "We're first on, so get there early. We shall only be playing loud and fast songs, none of this prog nonsense."

In 2020, the band released two EPs containing two tracks each, titled A Slow Attack, Parts 1 and 2. It was the first new material in fourteen years with only a limited explanation given.

== Discography ==
- This Is Such A Quiet Town (2003)
- Peace Burial at Sea (2006)
