= Queen Katherine and Patience =

Painting by Charles Robert Leslie

- Artist: Charles Robert Leslie
- Year: 1842
- Type: Oil on canvas, genre painting
- Dimensions: 58.3 cm × 50.7 cm (23.0 in × 20.0 in)
- Location: Victoria and Albert Museum, London

Queen Katherine and Patience is an oil painting by the Anglo-American artist Charles Robert Leslie, from 1842. It is held at the Victoria and Albert Museum, in London.

== History and description ==
It depicts a passage in Act III Scene I from William Shakespeare's Jacobean era history play Henry VIII. Catherine of Aragon is attended by her lady-in-waiting Patience as she grows melancholy about her estrangement from her husband Henry VIII. Leslie based his depiction of the queen on contemporary paintings.

Scenes from popular literature were fashionable in the late Regency and early Victorian era. Leslie had produced a significant number of them including another Shakespeare-inspired work Autolycus.

The painting was displayed at the Royal Academy Exhibition of 1842 at the National Gallery at Trafalgar Square. It was acquired by the art collector John Sheepshanks, who donated it in 1857 as part of the Sheepshanks Gift to the new Victoria and Albert Museum in South Kensington.

== Bibliography ==
- Roe, Sonia. Oil Paintings in Public Ownership in the Victoria and Albert Museum. Public Catalogue Foundation, 2008.
