= Bad News from Sea =

Painting by Richard Redgrave

- Artist: Richard Redgrave
- Year: 1842
- Type: Oil on panel, genre painting
- Dimensions: 81. cm × 70.5 cm (32 in × 27.8 in)
- Location: Private collection

Bad News from Sea is an 1842 oil painting by the British artist Richard Redgrave. A genre work, it depicts a sailor's happy home about to be plunged into mourning by the bad news from sea. The wife and mother of the baby and young children holds a letter bearing a black seal which announces a loss of her husband which she hesitates to open.

Redgrave was noted for his interest in social realism during the early Victorian era. The picture was a displayed at the Royal Academy Exhibition of 1842 held at the National Gallery and again at the British Institution exhibition of 1843 in Pall Mall. The painting was auctioned by Bonhams in 2019.

== Bibliography ==
- Trezise, Simon. The West Country as a Literary Invention; Putting Fiction in Its Place. University of Exeter Press, 2000.
- Treuherz, Julian. Hard Times: Social Realism in Victorian Art. Lund Humphries, 1987.
