= The Origin of the Harp =

Painting by Daniel Maclise

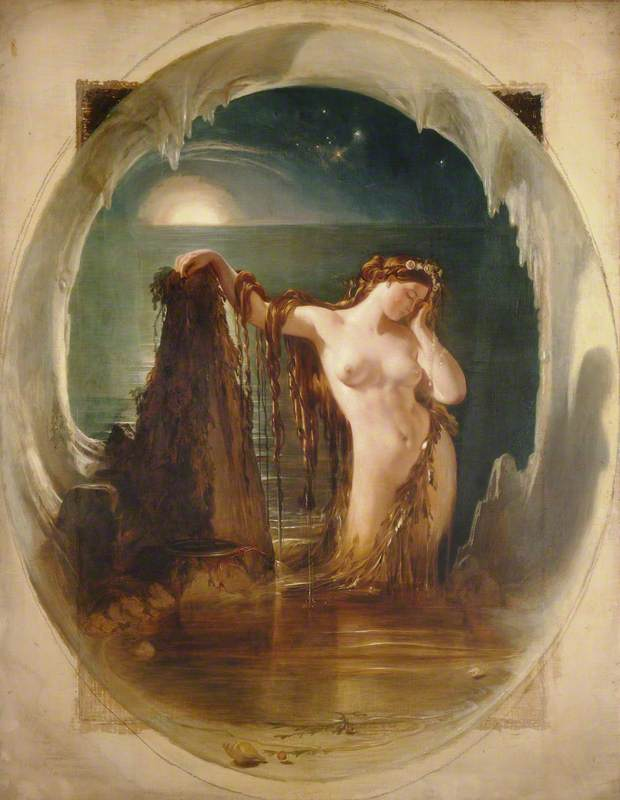
- Artist: Daniel Maclise
- Year: 1842
- Type: Oil on canvas, history painting
- Dimensions: 110.4 cm × 85 cm (43.5 in × 33 in)
- Location: Manchester Art Gallery, Manchester

The Origin of the Harp is an oil nude history painting by the Irish artist Daniel Maclise, from 1842. Inspired by a work by the poet Thomas Moore, it shows a sea nymph metamorphosing into a harp. Strategically-placed seaweed prevents her from being completely nude.

It was displayed at the Royal Academy's Summer Exhibition of 1842 at the National Gallery, in London. Today the painting is in the collection of the Manchester Art Gallery, having been acquired in 1917.

== Bibliography ==
- Ausoni, Alberto. Music in Art. J. Paul Getty Museum, 2009.
- Murray, Peter. Daniel Maclise, 1806-1870: Romancing the Past. Crawford Art Gallery, 2009.
- Weston, Nancy. Daniel Maclise: Irish Artist in Victorian London. Four Courts Press, 2009.
- Wright, Christopher, Gordon, Catherine May & Smith, Mary Peskett. British and Irish Paintings in Public Collections: An Index of British and Irish Oil Paintings by Artists Born Before 1870 in Public and Institutional Collections in the United Kingdom and Ireland. Yale University Press, 2006.
