= The Play Scene in Hamlet =

Painting by Daniel Maclise

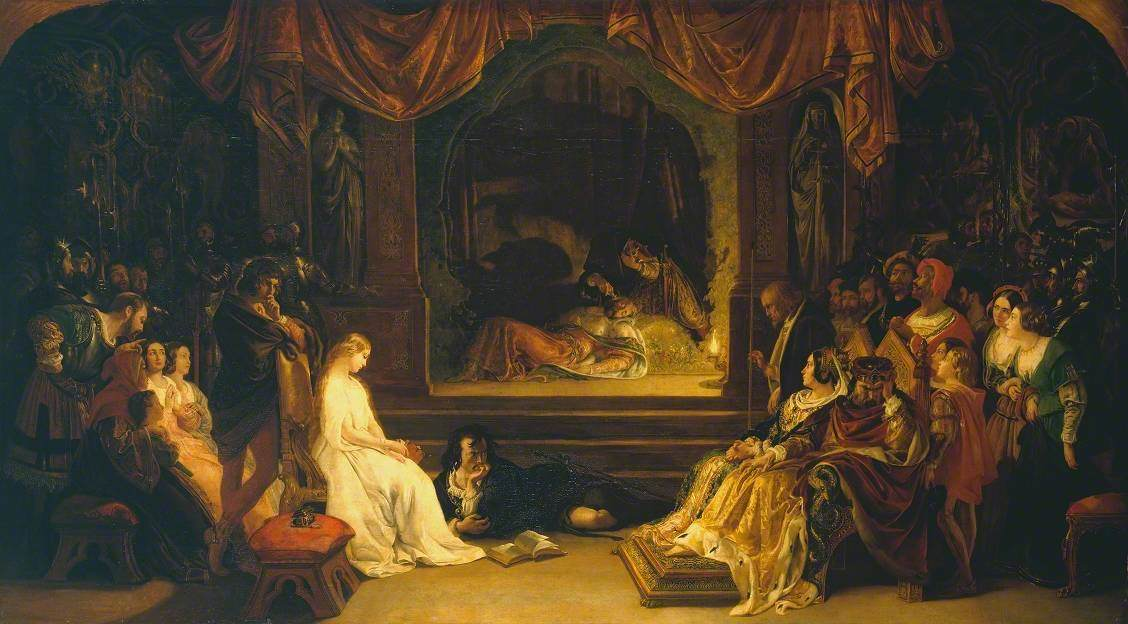
- Artist: Daniel Maclise
- Year: 1842
- Type: Oil on canvas, history painting
- Dimensions: 152.4 cm × 274.3 cm (60.0 in × 108.0 in)
- Location: Tate Britain, London

The Play Scene in Hamlet is an 1842 oil painting by the Irish artist Daniel Maclise. It portrays a scene from the tragedy Hamlet by William Shakespeare. At Elsinore Castle Hamlet arranges for a group of actors to perform a scene depicting the murder of his father, exposing his uncle King Claudius as his killer.

The painting was displayed at the Royal Academy Exhibition of 1842 at the National Gallery in London. It was acquired by the art collector Robert Vernon who in 1847 donated it to the nation as part of the Vernon Gift. Today it is in the collection of the Tate Britain.

== Bibliography ==
- Benton, Michael. Studies in the Spectator Role: Literature, Painting and Pedagogy. Routledge, 2017.
- Murray, Peter. Daniel Maclise, 1806-1870: Romancing the Past. University of Michigan, 2008. .
- Weston, Nancy. Daniel Maclise: Irish Artist in Victorian London. Four Courts Press, 2001.
- Young, Alan R. Hamlet and the Visual Arts, 1709-1900. University of Delaware Press, 2002.
