= Campo Santo, Venice =

Painting by J. M. W. Turner

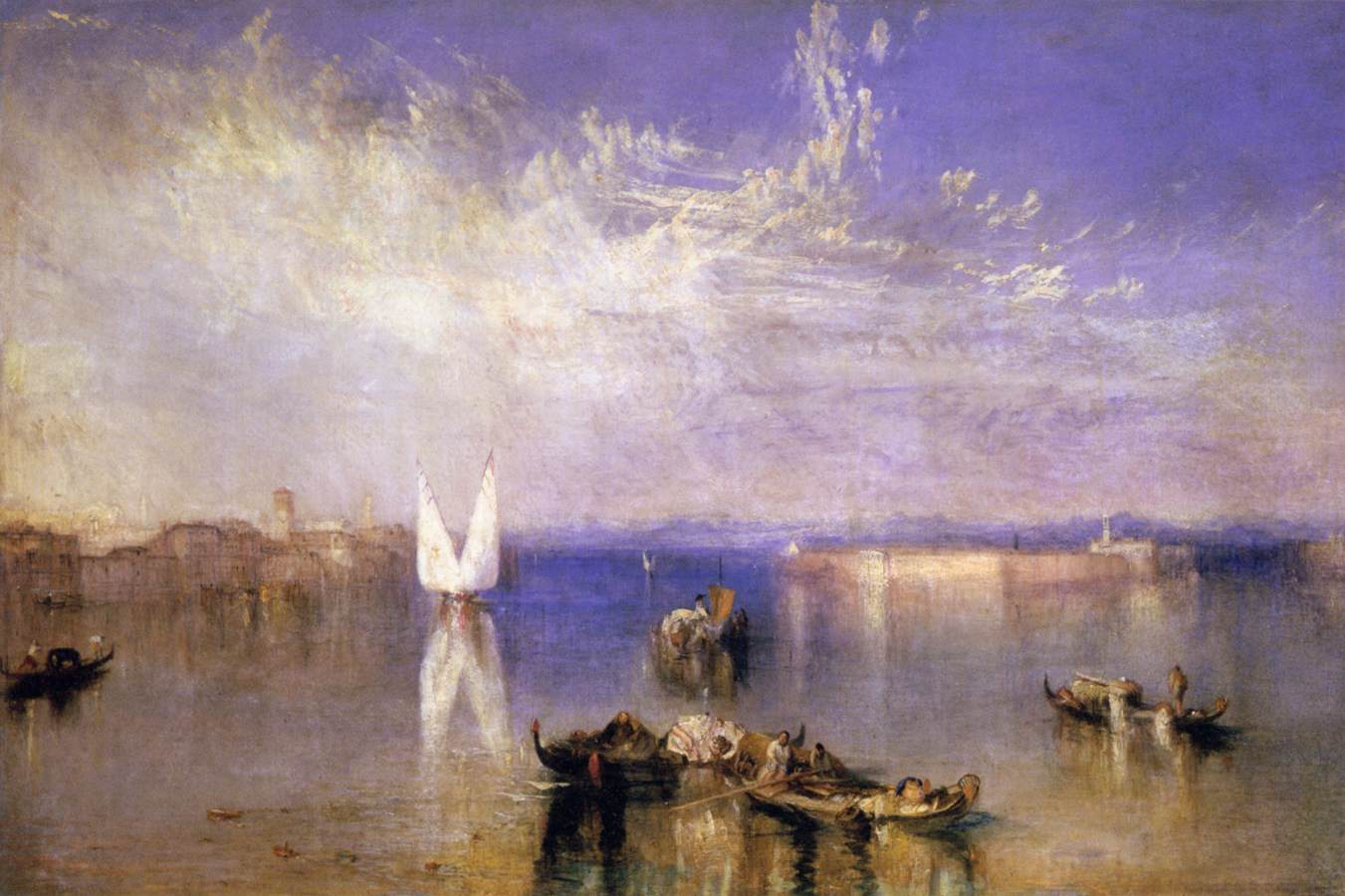
- Artist: J. M. W. Turner
- Year: 1842
- Type: Oil on canvas, landscape painting
- Dimensions: 62.2 cm × 92.7 cm (24.5 in × 36.5 in)
- Location: Toledo Museum of Art, Ohio
- Website: toledomuseum.org/...venice

Campo Santo, Venice is an 1842 landscape painting by the British artist J.M.W. Turner. It was one of a number of portrayals of Venice Turner produced during the later stages of his career. It depicts a view of the island of Campo Santo where a cemetery had recently been established on the site of a historic monastery. Although Venice was widely painted during the century, it was a view that was rarely depicted. The city of Venice itself is shown to the left. The painting was displayed at the Royal Academy Exhibition of 1842 held at London's National Gallery. Today the picture is in the collection of the Toledo Museum of Art in Ohio.

== See also ==
- List of paintings by J. M. W. Turner

== Bibliography ==
- Bailey, Anthony. J.M.W. Turner: Standing in the Sun. Tate Enterprises Ltd, 2013.
- Costello, Leo. J.M.W. Turner and the Subject of History. Taylor and Francis, 2017
- Finberg, Alexander Joseph. In Venice with Turner. Cotswold Gallery, 1930.
- Hamilton, James (ed.) Turner and Italy. National Galleries of Scotland, 2009.
- Herrmann, Luke. Nineteenth Century British Painting. Charles de la Mare, 2000.
