= Portrait of Michael Faraday =

Painting by Thomas Phillips

- Artist: Thomas Phillips
- Year: 1841-1842
- Type: Oil on canvas, portrait painting
- Dimensions: 90.8 cm × 71.1 cm (35.7 in × 28.0 in)
- Location: National Portrait Gallery, London

Portrait of Michael Faraday is an oil on canvas portrait painting by the British artist Thomas Phillips, from 1841-1842. It depicts the English scientist Michael Faraday. Faraday was a leading physicist and chemist who began his career as an assistant to Humphry Davy.

Phillips was a noted portraitist of the Regency and early Victorian era. He depicts Faraday with a trough battery of the sort he used in his electrical experiments while the furnace flames to the right are a reference to the scientist's metallurgical experiments. The painting was exhibited at the Royal Academy's Summer Exhibition of 1842. Today it is in the collection of the National Portrait Gallery in London, having been acquired in 1868.

== See also ==
- Portrait of Sir Humphry Davy, an 1821 painting by Thomas Lawrence

== Bibliography ==
- Funnell, Peter. Victorian Portraits in the National Portrait Gallery Collection. National Portrait Gallery, 1996.
- Tibbetts, Gary G. How the Great Scientists Reasoned: The Scientific Method in Action. Newnes, 2013.
- Wheatley, Henry Benjamin. Historical portraits. George Bell, 1897.
