= Peace – Burial at Sea =

Painting by J. M. W. Turner

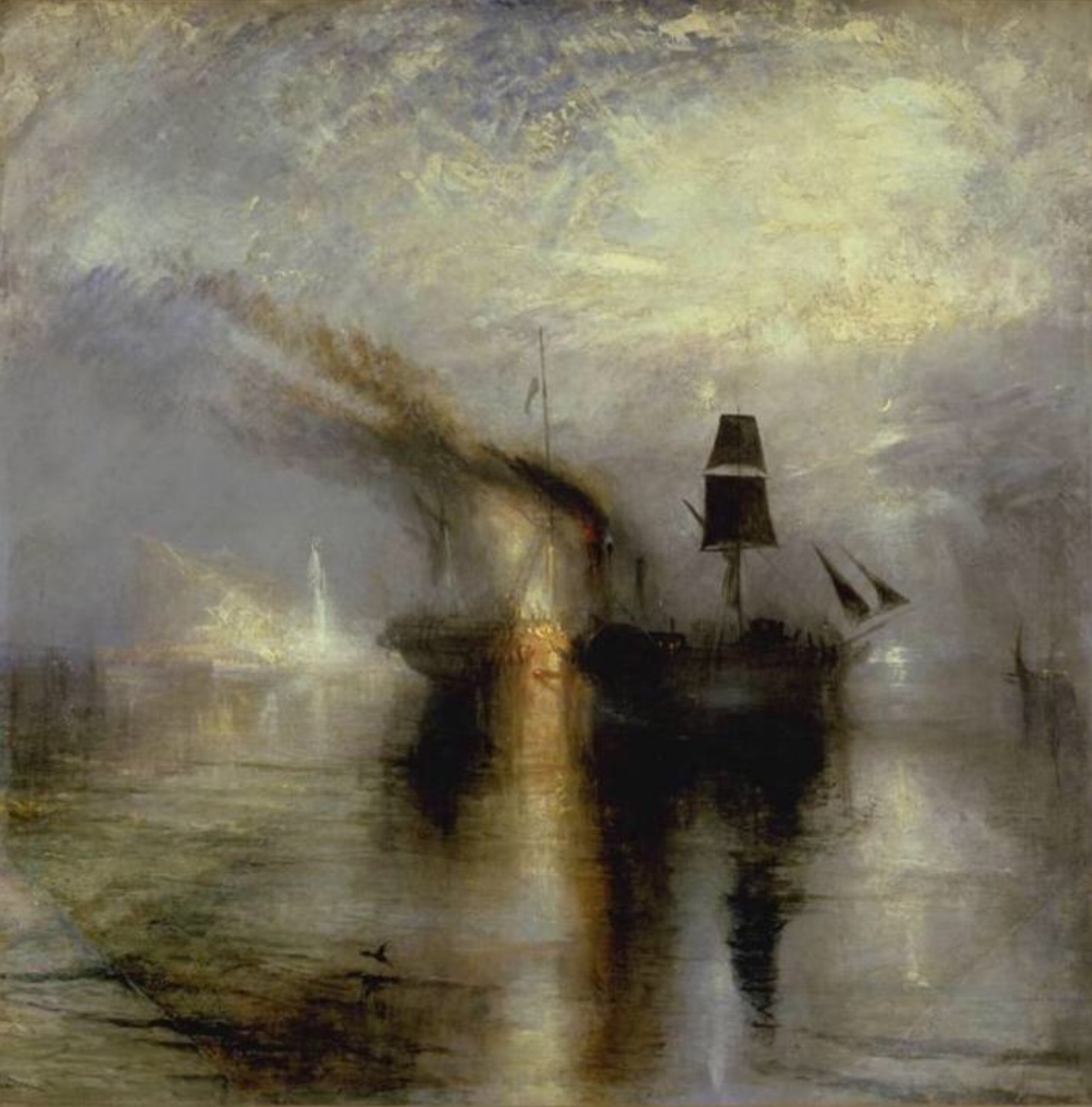
- Artist: J. M. W. Turner
- Year: 1842
- Medium: Oil on canvas
- Dimensions: 87 cm × 86.7 cm (34 in × 34.1 in)
- Location: Tate Britain, London
- Website: tate.org.uk/...n00528

Peace – Burial at Sea is an oil painting on canvas by the English Romantic artist J. M. W. Turner (1775–1851), first exhibited in 1842. The painting serves as a memorial tribute to his friend, the Scottish painter Sir David Wilkie (1785–1841). Wilkie died of typhoid in 1841 as he returned from the Middle East. Fearful the disease would spread, the Governor of Gibraltar refused to allow his body ashore, so Wilkie was buried at sea.

It was intended as a companion piece to War. The Exile and the Rock Limpet (also 1842) which alludes to the sordid demise of the former Emperor of France Napoleon Bonaparte (thus "War" and "Peace"). The two works are characterised by their sharply contrasting colours and tones: War utilises a strident yellow and red while Peace is painted a cool blend of white, blue and black.

Turner imagines a funeral carriage on the ship's deck, which symbolised the public funeral Wilkie should have had. Peace was criticised for the blackness of its sails but Turner replied that he wished he could have made them blacker.

The painting was part of the Turner bequest gifted by the artist to the British nation in 1859, and is now in the permanent collection of Tate Britain.

== In popular culture ==
The post-hardcore British band Peace Burial at Sea take their name from the painting.

In July 2013, the National Gallery of Australia physically recreated the painting in real time with live action inclusive of a ship in Sydney Harbour in conjunction with the exhibit at the museum Turner from the Tate: The Making of a Master.

== See also ==
- List of paintings by J. M. W. Turner
- View of Sir David Wilkie's House in Kensington, an 1842 painting tribute to Wilkie by William Collins
