= Portrait of Muhammad Ali of Egypt =

Painting by David Wilkie

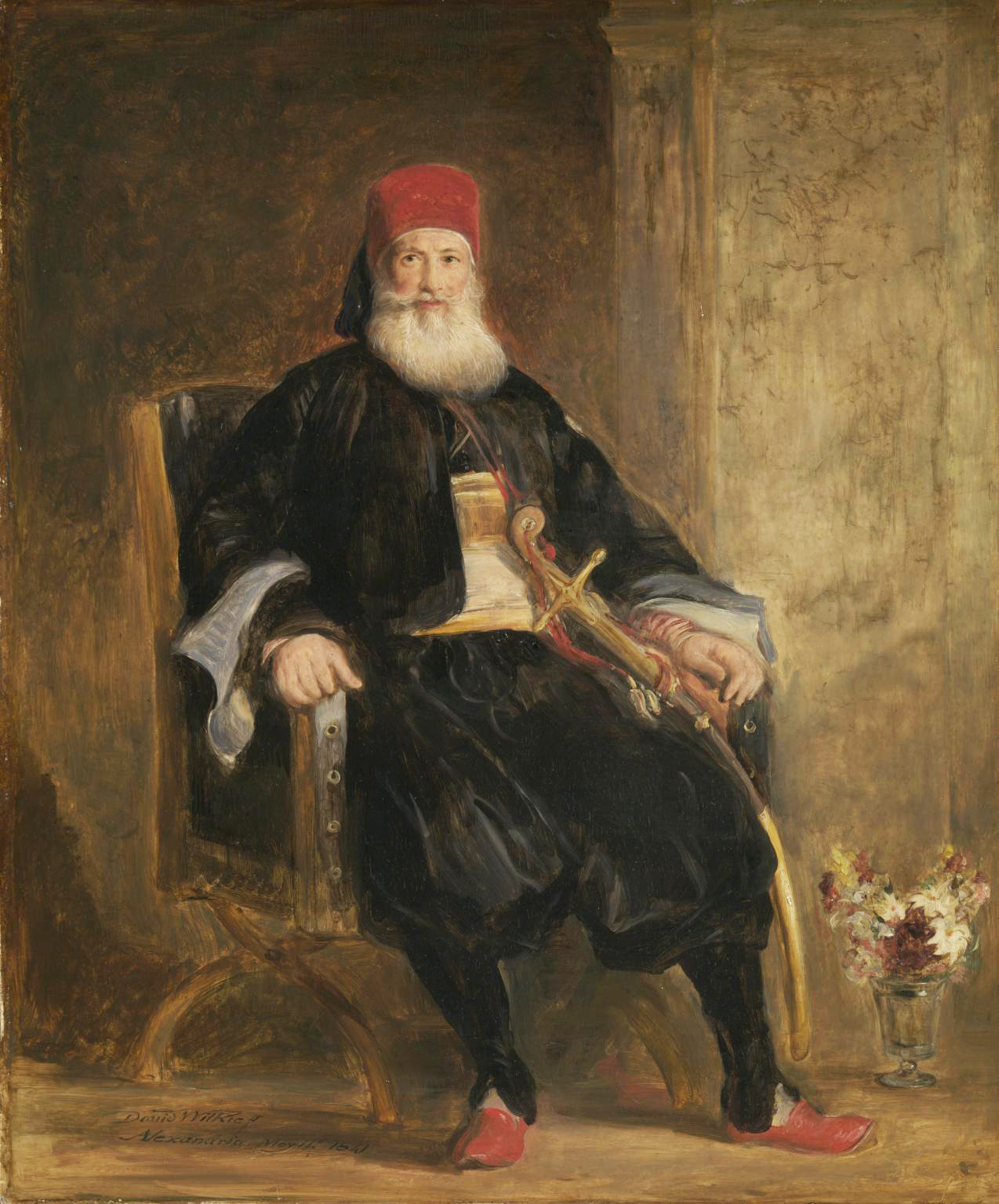
- Artist: David Wilkie
- Year: 1841
- Type: Oil on board, portrait painting
- Dimensions: 50.8 cm × 61 cm (20.0 in × 24 in)
- Location: Tate Britain, London

Portrait of Muhammad Ali of Egypt is an 1841 portrait painting by the British artist David Wilkie. It depicts Muhammad Ali, the Albanian-born Pasha of Egypt.

A member of the Royal Academy known for his genre and history paintings, Wilkie travelled to the Middle East in order to study scenes of the Holy Land. The outbreak of Egyptian–Ottoman War largely limited history time in Jerusalem and he spent much of his time in Constantinople. He produced this work while waiting at Alexandria for a ship home.

The sitter is dressed in traditional costume, but wears a fez rather than a turban. It was Wilkie's final painting. He died on his way home to Britain while onboard a ship off Gibraltar. The work was displayed posthumously at the Royal Academy Exhibition of 1842 in London. The painting is today in the collection of the Tate Britain, having been acquired in 1927.

== Bibliography ==
- Beaulieu, Jill & Roberts, Mary. Orientalism's Interlocutors: Painting, Architecture, Photography. Duke University Press, 2002.
- Burritt, Amanda M. Visualising Britain’s Holy Land in the Nineteenth Century. Springer International, 2020.
- Tromans, Nicholas. David Wilkie: The People's Painter. Edinburgh University Press, 2007.
