= War. The Exile and the Rock Limpet =

Painting by Joseph Mallord William Turner

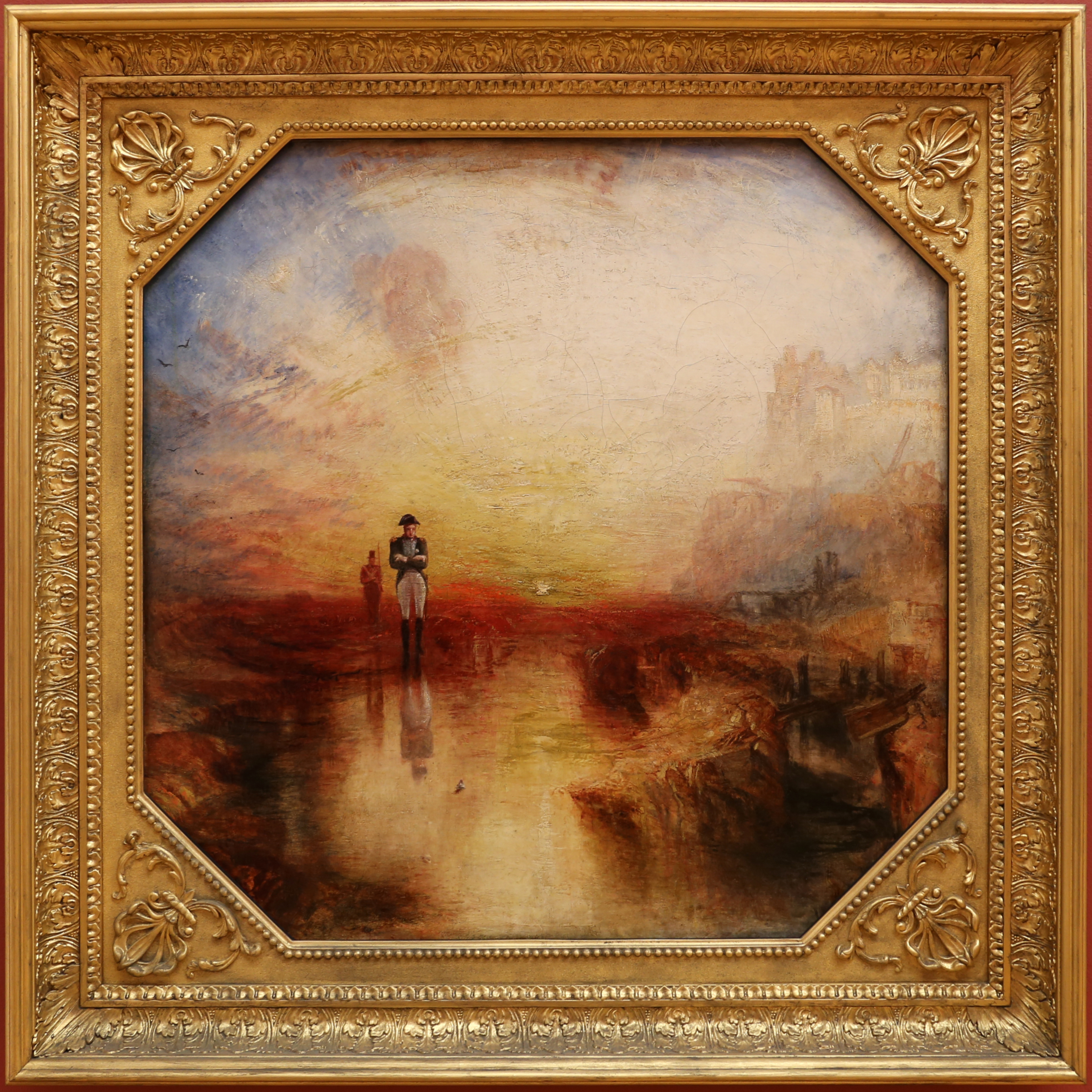
- Artist: J. M. W. Turner
- Year: 1842
- Medium: oil on canvas
- Dimensions: 79.4 cm × 79.4 cm (31.3 in × 31.3 in)
- Location: Tate Britain, London
- Website: www.tate.org.uk...n00529

War. The Exile and the Rock Limpet is an oil painting of 1842 by the English Romantic painter J. M. W. Turner (1775–1851). Intended to be a companion piece to Turner's Peace - Burial at Sea, War is a painting that depicts a moment from Napoleon Bonaparte's exile at Saint Helena. In December 1815, the former Emperor was taken by the British government to the Longwood House, despite its state of disrepair, to live in captivity; during his final years of isolation, Napoleon had fallen into despair. Turner's decision to pair the painting with Peace was heavily criticized when it was first exhibited but it is also seen as predecessor to his more famous piece Rain, Steam and Speed – The Great Western Railway (1844).

== Background ==
At the conclusion of his Hundred Days, Napoleon Bonaparte, who suffered a decisive defeat at the Battle of Waterloo in June 1815, had fallen under the custody of the British after considering a bid for an escape to the United States. In December, the former Emperor was exiled to Saint Helena in the South Atlantic and housed under guard in the Longwood House, his situation worsened by the building's poor living conditions. Without any realistic hopes of escape from Saint Helena, Napoleon lived out his final days on the island until his death in 1821.

J. M. W. Turner was often inspired by conflicts from the Napoleonic era: his works The Battle of Trafalgar (1807) and The Fighting Temeraire are realizations of the artist's influences. Political overtones also are found in some of Turner's most famous pieces, including Snow Storm: Hannibal and his Army Crossing the Alps (1832). In 1840, Napoleon's ashes were returned to France for a state burial on request by Louis Philippe I, inspiring Turner to make the former Emperor the subject of War. The Exile and the Rock Limpet.

War depicts a moment during Napoleon's exile on St. Helena. While on guard of a British sentry, a prevalent reminder of his captivity, Napoleon bows slightly to study a lone rock limpet. In his portrayal of him, Turner sought to embody the futility of war. The sunset behind the figure—Turner's "sea of blood" as he described it—symbolizes the past hardships of war experienced during Napoleon's military campaigns.

War debuted at the Royal Academy of Arts besides Turner's other artwork Peace. Burial at Sea in 1842. Peace commemorates Turner's friend Scottish artist Sir David Wilkie who, while on a return voyage from the Middle East, died of an illness in 1841. Like its companion piece, War was painted on a smaller canvas and was exhibited in an octagonal frame design. Together, War and Peace contrast the heroic figure that was Napoleon with Wilkie's lonely burial at sea. However, War fared poorly with critics who questioned Turner's decision to pair it with Peace, widely considered the better of the two pieces. Turner's abstract approach to War is noted as an early stepping stone toward his more well-received painting Rain, Steam and Speed – The Great Western Railway (1844).

== See also ==
- List of paintings by J. M. W. Turner
