= Robert Vernon (art patron) =

English contractor and businessman

Robert Vernon (1774–1849) was an English contractor and businessman, known as a patron of art.

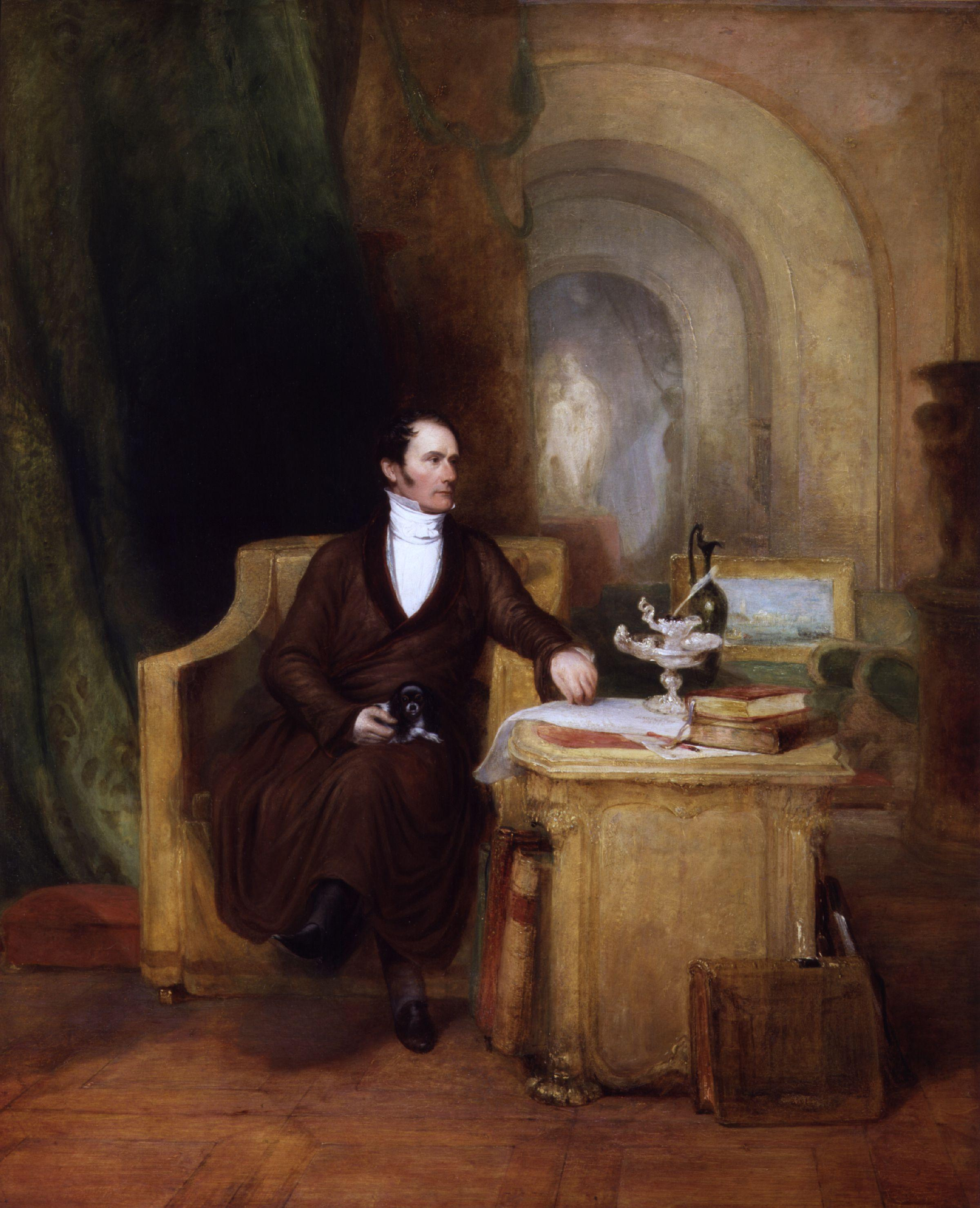
Robert Vernon, 1848 portrait by Henry Collen and George Jones

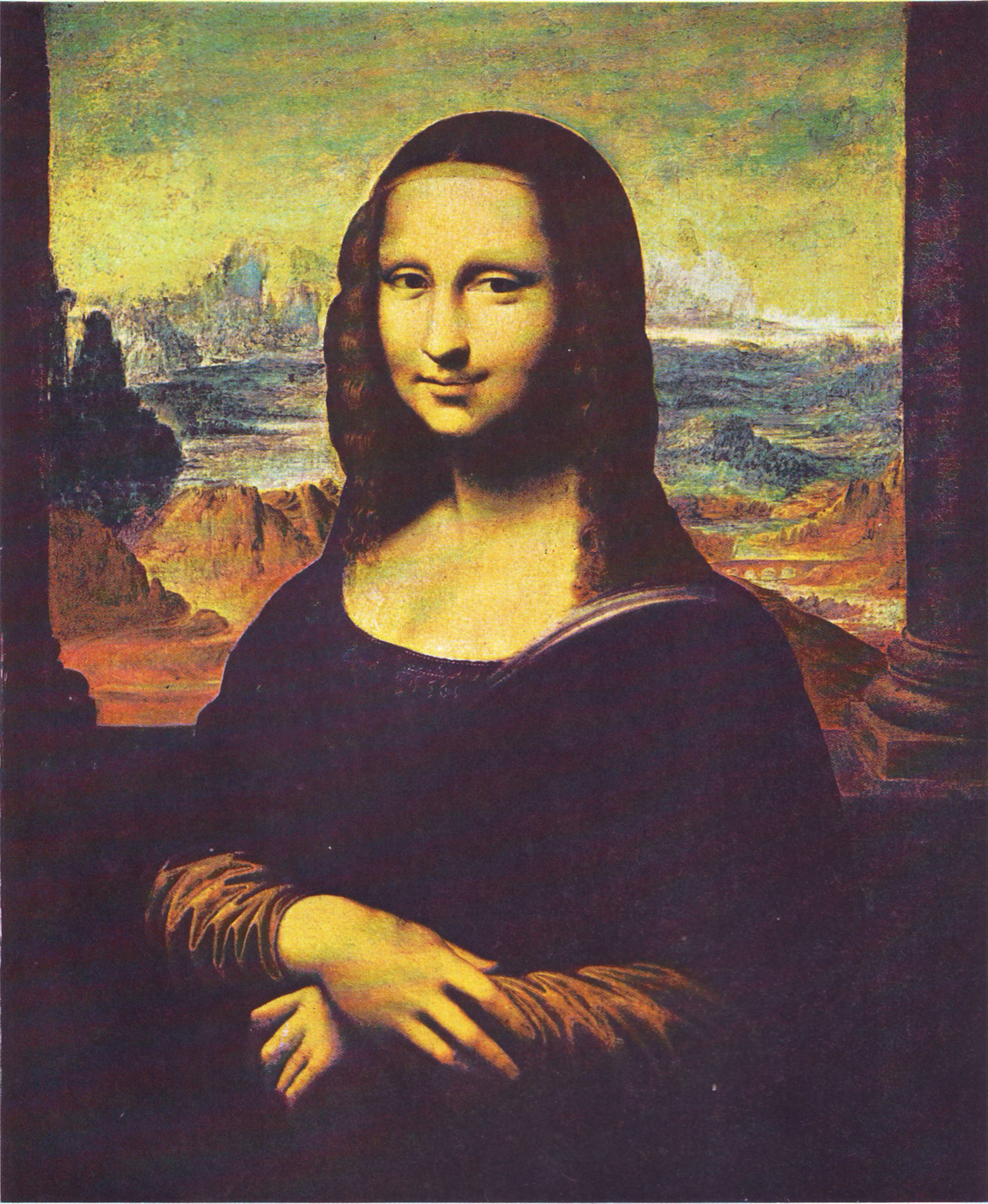
Copy of Mona Lisa, formerly in the Vernon collection

== Life ==
Vernon was a self-made man, a jobmaster, posting contractor, and dealer in horses in London in a large way. He amassed a fortune as contractor for the supply of horses to the British armies during the Napoleonic Wars.

Between 1820 and 1847 Vernon collected about 200 pictures by living British artists, with a few by other European painters. On 22 December 1847 he presented the Vernon Gift, a selection of 166 pictures from his collection, to the nation through a gift to the National Gallery.

His collection of mainly modern British art included paintings by Joshua Reynolds, Thomas Gainsborough, John Constable and J.M.W Turner. There were also sculptures by E.H. Baily and John Gibson.

This collection was housed at first in Marlborough House; it was moved to the South Kensington Museum, and in 1876 to the National Gallery in Trafalgar Square. It was, with the opening in 1897 of the Tate (the National Gallery of British Art) subsequently split between the National Gallery and Tate Gallery. The National Gallery kept just one painting from a foreign artist.

He also intended to give money in his will to support art and artists. In the event Leicester Viney Smith inherited from the unmarried Vernon, changing his surname to do so.

Vernon was a fellow of the Society of Antiquaries. He died at his house in Pall Mall, London on 22 May 1849, and was buried at Ardington, Berkshire, where he owned property.
