= Hampstead Heath, Branch Hill Pond =

Painting by John Constable

- Artist: John Constable
- Year: 1828
- Type: Oil on canvas, landscape painting
- Dimensions: 59.6 cm × 77.6 cm (23.5 in × 30.6 in)
- Location: Victoria and Albert Museum; London

Hampstead Heath, Branch Hill Pond is an 1828 landscape painting by the British artist John Constable. It features a view of Branch Hill. It was a favourite view of Constable, who lived nearby, and featured frequently in his work with different compositions. This version notably features a horse and buggy in the foreground. The painting was displayed at the Royal Academy Exhibition of 1828 held at Somerset House. It was acquired by the art collector John Sheepshanks who donated it to the Victoria and Albert Museum in 1857 as part of the Sheepshanks Gift. The engraver David Lucas produced an 1831 mezzotint based on the painting.

Another, different version of the landscape that was produced the same year is now in the Cleveland Museum of Art in Ohio.

== See also ==
- Branch Hill Pond, Hampstead Heath, a slightly earlier work now in the Virginia Museum of Fine Arts
- List of paintings by John Constable

== Bibliography ==
- Reynolds, Graham .Catalogue of the Constable Collection. Victoria and Albert Museum, 1973.
- Roe, Sonia. Oil Paintings in Public Ownership in the Victoria and Albert Museum. Public Catalogue Foundation, 2008.
- Thornes, John E. John Constable's Skies: A Fusion of Art and Science. A&C Black, 1999.
