= The Sempstress =

Painting by Richard Redgrave

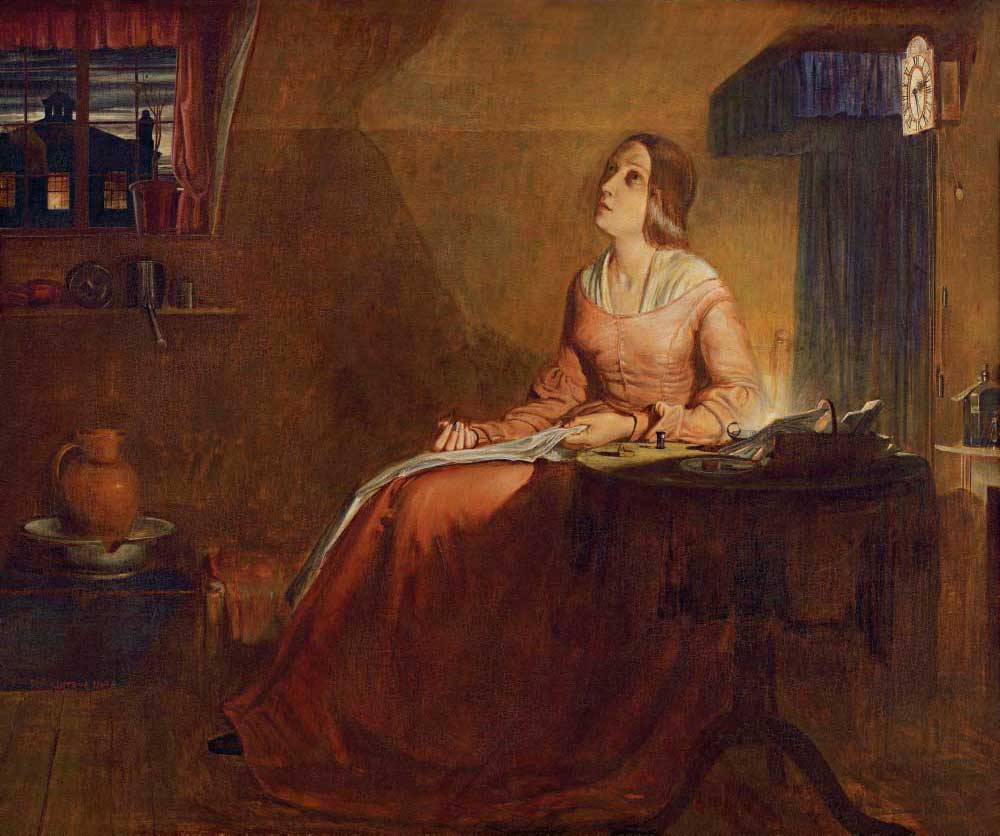
- 1846 version in the Tate Britain
- Artist: Richard Redgrave
- Year: 1844
- Type: Oil on canvas, genre painting
- Dimensions: 63.9 cm × 76.9 cm (25.2 in × 30.3 in)
- Location: Tate Britain, London

The Sempstress is an 1844 genre painting by the British artist Richard Redgrave. It shows a seamstress working alone at night in a sparsely furnished attic room.

Redgrave was known for his sympathetic portrayals of those in everyday jobs. Two of his sisters worked as governesses, providing inspiration for his work The Governess. The painting was displayed at the Royal Academy Exhibition of 1844 at the National Gallery in London, where it as exhibited along with lines from The Song of the Shirt by Thomas Hood. A replica version, produced in 1846, is now in the collection of the Tate Britain, in London.

== Bibliography ==
- Lynn Mae Alexander, Women, Work, and Representation: Needlewomen in Victorian Art and Literature, Ohio University Press, 2003
- Ian Haywood, The Revolution in Popular Literature: Print, Politics and the People, 1790-1860, Cambridge University Press, 2004
