= Cinderella's stepsisters =

Fictional characters

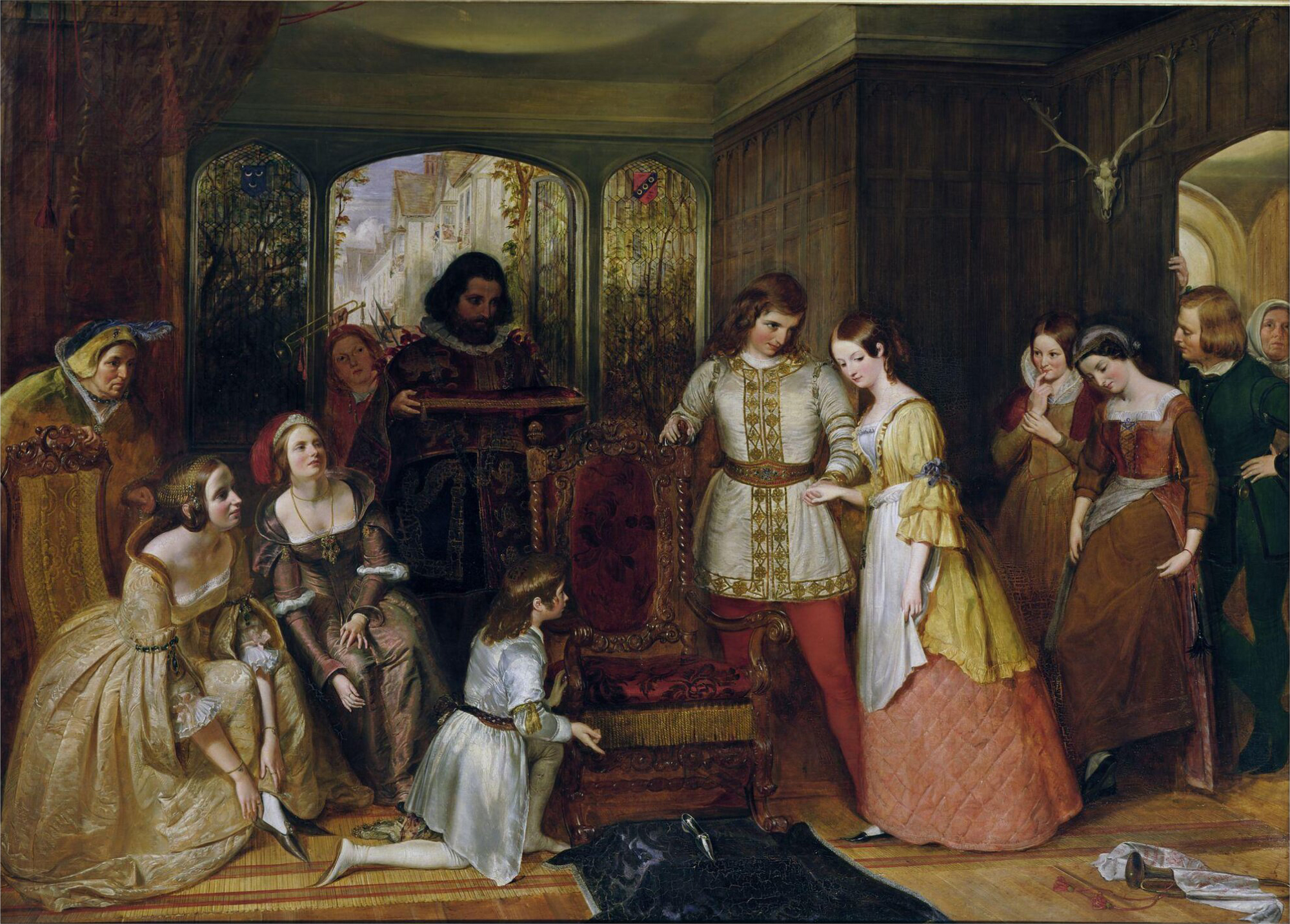
Cinderella About to Try on the Glass Slipper by Richard Redgrave, 1842

Cinderella's stepsisters are antagonists in the fairy tale and pantomime, Cinderella. They are the daughters of Cinderella's wicked stepmother, who treat her poorly. The sisters have been in variations of the story from as early as researchers have been able to determine.

== Early depictions ==
=== Ancient Chinese tale ===
In the ancient Chinese story of Ye Xian, the "ugly sister" character is the titular character's half-sister and is named Jun-li. In contrast to the beautiful and talented Ye Xian, Jun-li is unattractive and too lazy to learn any particular skills. Jun-li and her mother, Jin, maltreat Ye Xian, forcing her to clean the cave in which they reside. Jun-li and her mother also put an end to Ye Xian's newfound happiness after they discover that Ye Xian's late mother has reincarnated in the form of a ten-foot-long golden carp, which grants her wishes. Jun-li and her mother slay and eat the fish, not knowing that Ye Xian has salvaged the creature's bones and buried them beneath her bed, and once again her wishes are granted. After Ye Xian loses a golden slipper at the local festival, the warlord who discovers it visits the family cave, declaring he will marry the woman whose foot fits the slipper. Jun-li and her mother fail to get their feet into the slipper, but Ye Xian succeeds and dons the finery she wore at the festival. Outraged at their cruelty toward her, the warlord exiles forever Jun-li and her mother to the wilderness, where they are killed by a rain of flying stones.

=== Perrault's fairy tale ===
In Charles Perrault's original fairytale, the sisters were Cinderella's stepsisters, and are described as "proud and haughty" rather than ugly, though Cinderella is described as being "far lovelier than her sisters, though they were always dressed fashionably." The unnamed younger stepsister is described as being not as rude or spiteful as the elder, who is named Charlotte (Javotte in French). The stepsisters are forgiven for their cruelty and Cinderella invites them to the palace to live with her, and she marries each of them to a wealthy lord.

=== Brothers Grimm version ===
In Jacob and Wilhelm Grimm's considerably much darker version of the tale, entitled Aschenputtel in German, the unnamed stepsisters are described as having "beautiful faces and fair skin, but hearts that were foul and black", and are portrayed in a much more malicious light than Perrault's version. Indeed, the stepsisters are also traitors since, under the stepmother's advice, they attempt to trick the prince by cutting off their heels and toes to make the slipper fit their foot, not having more need to go on foot when one of them will be queen, but the prince spots the blood on their stockings thanks to Aschenputtel's magic doves, her loyal friends and minions, and realizes they are imposters. Once Aschenputtel is recognized by the prince, the stepmother and the two limping sisters were thunderstruck, and grew pale with anger. Nonetheless, the false stepsisters try to profit by getting rich and invite themselves to Aschenputtel's royal wedding, with the hope to worm their way into her Favour as the future queen. But Aschenputtel's doves tear the stepsisters' eyes out, sentencing them to a lifetime of horrible blindness as truly awful comeuppance for their diabolical behavior.

=== Rossini opera ===
In the opera La Cenerentola (1817) by Gioachino Rossini and Jacopo Ferretti, the sisters are named Clorinda and Tisbe.

== In pantomime ==
Traditionally, the two stepsisters are played by men (although in some adaptions, they are played by women, whereas in others they are played by a man and a woman) and their attire is outrageous and garish, parodying the latest fashions. A favorite gag is to have one sister tall and thin, the other short and fat, only for them to state that they are "identical twins." They are portrayed as unruly man-eaters who provide much of the story's comic relief, flirting with men in the audience and repeatedly insulting each other yet teaming up to torment Cinderella. The sisters are extremely jealous of Cinderella, as she is very beautiful and they are very ugly. In order to ensure no man will want to marry her, they reduce her to their maidservant and force her into waiting on them non-stop and doing all the dirtiest kitchen jobs. Sometimes Cinderella has an alternate name, such as "Isabella", "Ella", or "Arabella". and the jealous stepsisters rename her "Cinderella" due to the fact she mostly sweeps and cleans the firesides and is constantly covered in ashes and cinders. When Buttons, the Baron's footman delivers the news of the Royal Ball, the stepsisters plot to claim the prince as their own. When they realise Cinderella has also been invited, they force her, or trick her, into tearing up her ticket. They then strut off to the Ball and are amazed and horrified when Cinderella appears with the help of her fairy godmother. The Ball is often used as a comical scene in which the sisters humiliate themselves in an attempt to charm the prince, who is too enchanted with Cinderella to notice them. Then Cinderella flees at midnight, leaving one of her glass or crystal or silver slippers behind.

The next day, the Prince arrives with the news he will marry whomsoever the slipper fits. The two sisters fight and quarrel over who the shoe will fit. It is traditional to have one sister concealing a false leg beneath her skirt in an attempt to fool the prince. Another tradition is that one sister has yards and yards of multicoloured stockings beneath her skirt, which must be comically removed before trying the shoe on. When the shoe does not fit, the Prince allows Cinderella (who has either been tricked into leaving the house or locked in the cellar) to try it on. When the shoe fits, the stepsisters are horrified. Their fates are dependent upon which version is being told. Sometimes they are forgiven for their cruelty, other times they are demoted to servants in the prince's castle, or sometimes the Baron Hardup at last puts his foot down and stands up to them.

In more recent adaptations, the role of the wicked stepmother has been reduced in prominence and the sisters assume her role to a degree. Sometimes she has died or other times she has absconded with the family fortune and left Cinderella to cope with her two ugly daughters.

Unlike many characters in the pantomime, the stepsisters' names are not set. After Rossini's opera, for many years they were named Clorinda and Thisbe, now these names have fallen out of use and their names have changed to suit the fashions of the times. Often they are named after flowers, illnesses or celebrities. Notable ugly sisters have been played by Terry Scott and Julian Orchard (Theresa and Julia), Brian Murphy and Yootha Joyce (Georgina and Mildred after their sitcom characters George and Mildred), real life sisters Elsie and Doris Waters (Gert and Daisy after their radio sitcom characters), Brian Murphy and Roy Hudd (Amnesia and Magnesia), and Paul Merton and Ronnie Corbett (Lucretia and Griselda).

== Appearances in modern media ==
=== Disney depictions ===
Unlike the Grimms' version of the fairy tale "where the sisters were themselves 'beautiful and fair in appearance,'" Disney's 1950 film based on the story names the sisters Drizella (voiced by Rhoda Williams) and Anastasia (voiced by Lucille Bliss) and presents them as ugly and foolish. Southwest Texas State University's Department of English identifies various distinguishing characteristics of Drizella and Anastasia, such as exaggerated and naked feet emphasizing physical nature and a big bustle emphasizing clumsiness, which contrast with their more positively presented counterpart, Cinderella. Disney describes them as simply "spoiled, awkward, and ungainly." In the two direct-to-video sequels, Cinderella II and Cinderella III, it is revealed Anastasia is less cruel-intentioned than her older sister, stuck under her mother's thumb and acting out of frustration at not having love of her own. By the end of the third film, she has broken free of Lady Tremaine's evil influence, while her older sister remains unrepentantly on their mother's side.

In the 2015 live-action iteration of the story, the stepsisters are played by Sophie McShera (Drizella) and Holliday Grainger (Anastasia). They are portrayed as beautiful in appearance with very over-the-top clothes. However, as their own mother admits, they are both incredibly stupid. They make fun of Cinderella, but do occasionally talk civilly to her. They mostly squabble among themselves, leaving the serious cruelty to their mother and even apologizing to their stepsister before they leave the kingdom at the end of the film. One reviewer described them as "The female equivalents of Tweedle-Dee and Tweedle-Dum".

=== Rodgers and Hammerstein musical ===
In 1957, Rodgers and Hammerstein created a musical version of Cinderella especially for television, later also adapted for the stage. The story more closely follows the Perrault version. The stepsisters in this version are named Joy and Portia, played by Alice Ghostley and Kaye Ballard respectively.

In the 1965 remake, the sisters names are changed, this time named Prunella and Esmerelda, and they are played by Pat Carroll and Barbara Ruick respectively.

In 1997, there was another remake in which the sisters are played by Natalie Desselle and Veanne Cox, and their names are once again changed, this time being named Minerva and Calliope.

=== Shrek depictions ===
Doris and Mabel are ugly sisters in the films Shrek 2 and Shrek the Third. Both are voiced by men (Larry King voiced Doris and Regis Philbin voiced Mabel) and covered in lavish and poor applications of makeup, not unlike their usual portrayals in pantomime. Mabel is a villain who sides with the evil Prince Charming's conquest of the kingdom of Far Far Away. Doris, in contrast, seems to be on friendly terms with the protagonists (including her stepsister Cinderella). Doris and Mabel reconcile in the end upon Artie convincing the villains to not be villains after they were defeated by their respective opponents.

=== Once Upon a Time depictions ===
In ABC's Once Upon a Time, there is a total of five known versions of the stepsisters.

In the first Storybook, the stepsisters are named Clorinda and Tisbe, portrayed by Mekenna Melvin and Goldie Hoffman. They are based on the stepsisters from the Charles Perrault version of the fairytale, the operatic version, and the Disney version. However, another version of the stepsister from the Disney film, Anastasia, is not related to Cinderella and instead has a separate stepsister with a storyline that parallels Cinderella's. This version of the character is a primary antagonist of the spin-off series, Once Upon a Time in Wonderland, and is portrayed by Emma Rigby.

In the second Storybook, the stepsisters retain their Disney names of Anastasia and Drizella, portrayed by Yael Yurman and Adelaide Kane. Drizella is the main antagonist of the first half of the seventh season, while Anastasia dies prior to the start of the season, only to be revived. Both were members, though at different times, of the Coven of the Eight, a group of witches. They both eventually leave the Coven and reconcile, returning to the alternate Enchanted Forest.

== Criticism ==
Jasper Fforde in the novel The Big Over Easy presents a (notional) claim for damages from publishers over what is termed the persistent defamation of Ella's step-sisters. "A spokesman for the sisters explained: 'My clients are fed up with being constantly portrayed as physically repellent obnoxious harpies, and have decided to take action against the 984 publishers that have repeated the allegations without bothering to check their veracity.'"

== See also ==
- Confessions of an Ugly Stepsister, a 1999 novel by Gregory Maguire, and a 2002 TV movie adapted from the novel. The story is a retelling of Cinderella through the eyes of one of her stepsisters.
