= The Rival Performers =

Painting by John Callcott Horsley

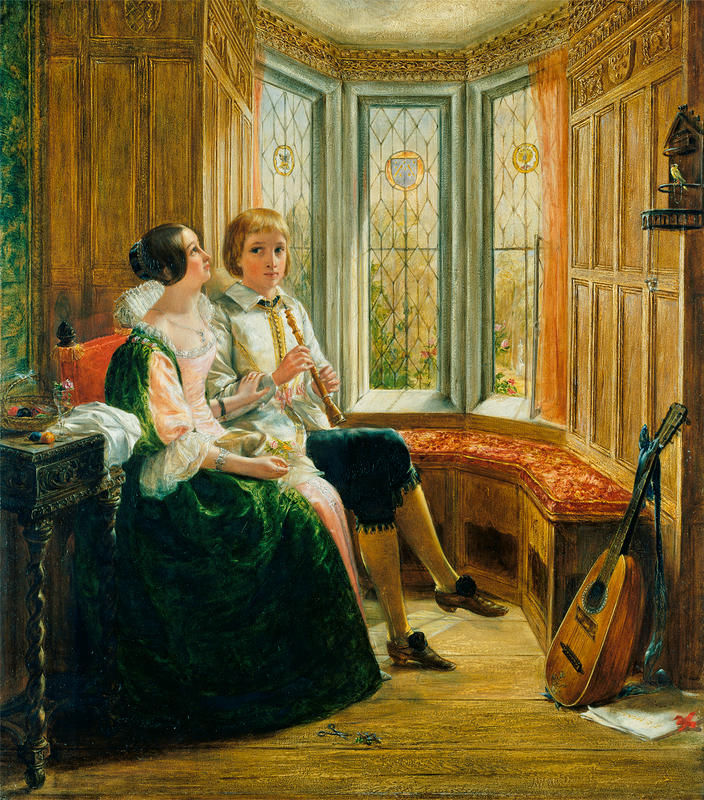
- Artist: John Callcott Horsley
- Year: 1839
- Type: Oil on panel, genre painting
- Dimensions: 45.7 cm × 40.6 cm (18.0 in × 16.0 in)
- Location: Victoria and Albert Museum; London

The Rival Performers is an 1839 historical genre painting by the British artist John Callcott Horsley. It depicts a scene set at in Haddon Hall in Derbyshire during the seventeenth century. A boy playing on the oboe competes unsuccessfully with a canary in a birdcage.

Horsley had visited Haddon Hall in 1835 and the painting is set in the dining room. The brother-in-law of Isambard Kingdom Brunel, he was a young artist at the beginning of his career when he produced this work. The painting was first displayed at the annual exhibition of the British Institution in Pall Mall in 1839. It was acquired by the noted art collector John Sheepshanks who in 1857 donated it to the Victoria and Albert Museum in South Kensington as part of the large Sheepshanks Gift. In 1870 Richard Redgrave called of the "most pleasing of Horsley's many pleasing works", suggesting it was inspired by an old story of a nightingale outperforming a minstrel.

== Bibliography ==
- Redgrave, Richard. The Sheepshanks Gallery. Bell and Daldy, 1870
- Roe, Sonia. Oil Paintings in Public Ownership in the Victoria and Albert Museum. Public Catalogue Foundation, 2008.
