= Branch Hill Pond, Hampstead Heath =

Painting by John Constable

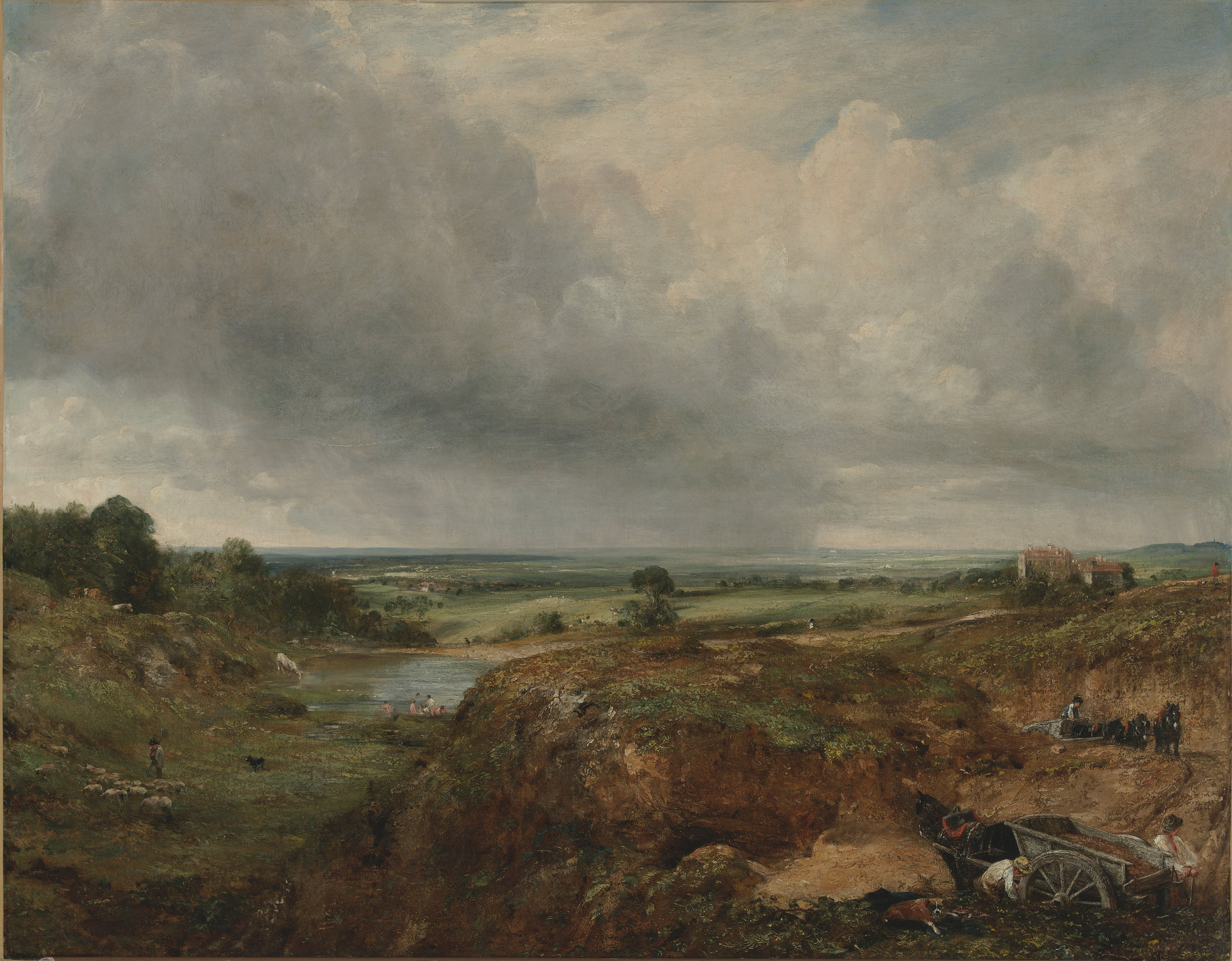
- Artist: John Constable
- Year: 1824-25
- Type: Oil on canvas, Landscape painting
- Dimensions: 87 cm × 103 cm (34.2 in × 40.5 in)
- Location: Virginia Museum of Fine Arts, Richmond, Virginia

Branch Hill Pond, Hampstead Heath is a landscape painting by the British artist John Constable. Painted between 1824 and 1825 it depicts the view from Branch Hill in Hampstead. Constable had lived in Hampstead, then beyond the outskirts of London, since 1819 and painted many views of the area. It was sold in 1825 to the collector Francis Darby. The painting shows some carts in the foreground as well as Branch Hill Pond. In the background are the fields around Harrow and the villages of Kilburn and Hendon. In the extreme distance is Windsor Castle.

It is now part of the collection of the Virginia Museum of Fine Arts in Richmond. Constable made a number of variations on the composition, including one now in the Victoria and Albert Museum in London that was exhibited at the 1828 Royal Academy's Summer Exhibition.

== See also ==
- List of paintings by John Constable
- Hampstead Heath, Branch Hill Pond, an 1828 painting by Constable of a similar view

== Bibliography ==
- Noon, Patrick & Bann, Stephen. Constable to Delacroix: British Art and the French Romantics. Tate, 2003.
- Reynolds, Graham. Constable's England. Metropolitan Museum of Art, 1983.
