= The Thames from Millbank =

Painting by Richard Redgrave

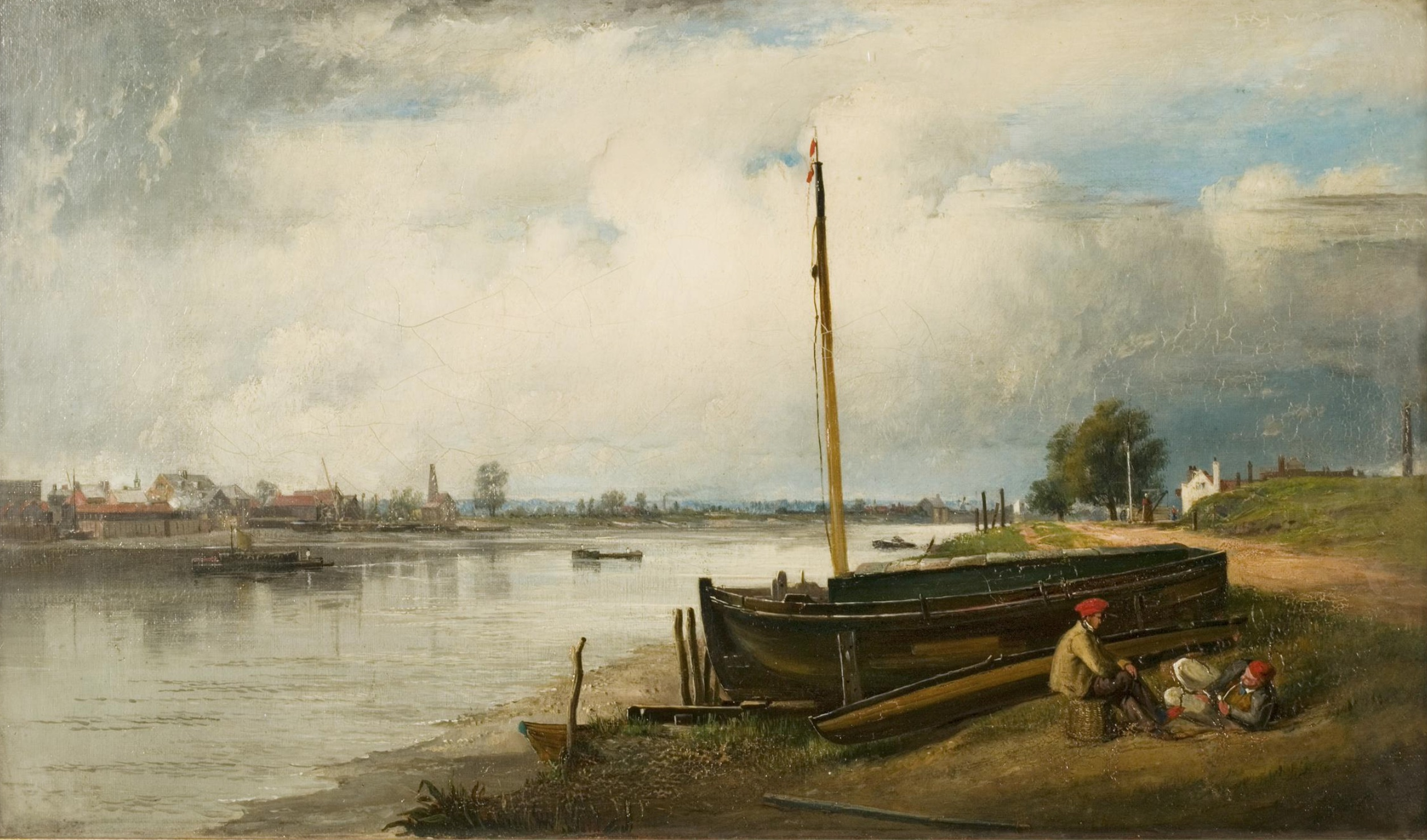
- Artist: Richard Redgrave
- Year: 1836
- Type: Oil on canvas, landscape painting
- Dimensions: 24.8 cm × 43.2 cm (9.8 in × 17.0 in)
- Location: Victoria and Albert Museum; London

The Thames from Millbank is an oil on canvas landscape painting by the English artist Richard Redgrave, from 1836. It is held at the Victoria and Albert Museum, in London.

== History and description ==
It depicts a view from the north bank of the River Thames at Millbank close to the modern-day location of the Tate Britain. At the time the area was still partially rural before it had been completely swallowed up by the expanding London. It is likely that Redgrave has chosen to exaggerate this to emphasise the countryside feeling and excluded Vauxhall Bridge. The southern-side is more developed, but predates the construction of the Albert Embankment. In the foreground, at the right, two men are chatting, one of them lying in the ground, the other seated, in front of two boats. Other boats are seem in a very peaceful depiction of the Thames.

The painting was displayed at the annual exhibition of the British Institution in Pall Mall in 1836. Acquired by the art collector John Sheepshanks it was donated by him to the Victoria and Albert Museum as part of the Sheepshanks Gift of 1857.

== Bibliography ==
- Parkinson, Ronald. Catalogue of British Oil Paintings 1820-1860. Victoria and Albert Museum, 1990.
- Roe, Sonia. Oil Paintings in Public Ownership in the Victoria and Albert Museum. Public Catalogue Foundation, 2008.
