= The Governess (painting) =

Painting by Richard Redgrave

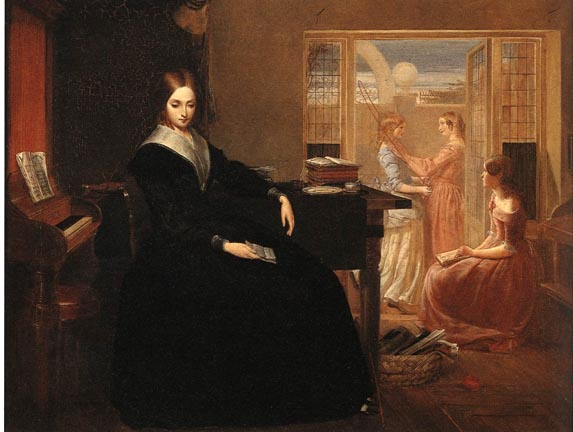
- Artist: Richard Redgrave
- Year: 1844
- Type: Oil on canvas, genre painting
- Dimensions: 71.1 cm × 91.5 cm (28.0 in × 36.0 in)
- Location: Victoria and Albert Museum, London

The Governess is an oil on canvas genre painting by the English artist Richard Redgrave, from 1844. It is held at the Victoria and Albert Museum, in London.

== History and description ==
It depicts a governess who has received a letter, possibly carrying bad news, that has stirred memories of home. Several versions were subsequently produced of the painting. Redgrave made his reputation during the early Victorian era for painting sympathetic scenes of servants.The painting was displayed at the Royal Academy Exhibition of 1845 at the National Gallery in London. Today it is in the collection of the Victoria and Albert Museum in South Kensington having been part of the 1857 Sheepshanks Gift, a large donation by the art collector John Sheepshanks. Redgrave had painted a prototype The Poor Teacher in 1843. When purchasing this picture Sheepshanks had persuaded Redgrave to make it look more cheerful by adding the playful children in the background.

== Bibliography ==
- Fletcher, Pamela. The Victorian Painting of Modern Life. Taylor & Francis, 2024.
- Hughes, Kathryn. The Victorian Governess. Bloomsbury, 2001.
- Lecaros, Cecilia Wadsö. The Victorian Governess Novel. Lund University Press, 2001.
- Roe, Sonia. Oil Paintings in Public Ownership in the Victoria and Albert Museum. Public Catalogue Foundation, 2008.
