= A Jack in Office =

Painting by Edwin Landseer

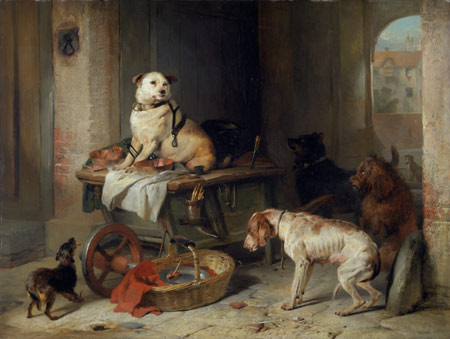
- Artist: Edwin Landseer
- Year: 1833
- Type: Oil on canvas, genre painting
- Dimensions: 50.2 cm × 66 cm (19.8 in × 26 in)
- Location: Victoria and Albert Museum, London

A Jack in Office is an 1833 oil painting by the British artist Edwin Landseer. The title is a reference to a slang term of the era for a pompous, petty official. It depicts the barrow of a salesman of dog meat who has temporary left it in an alleyway guarded by a Jack Russell Terrier who faces down four other dogs who hope by trickery or force to get their hands on the meat..

The work was displayed at the Royal Academy Exhibition of 1833 at Somerset House in London along with another notable Landseer work The Hunted Stag. It was enormously popular with the public.

Today the painting is in the collection of the Victoria and Albert Museum in South Kensington having been acquired through the Sheepshanks Gift of the art collector John Sheepshanks in 1857.

== Bibliography ==
- Donald, Diana. Picturing Animals in Britain, 1750-1850. Yale University Press, 2007.
- Ormond, Richard. Sir Edwin Landseer. Philadelphia Museum of Art, 1981.
