= Cinderella About to Try on the Glass Slipper =

Painting by Richard Redgrave

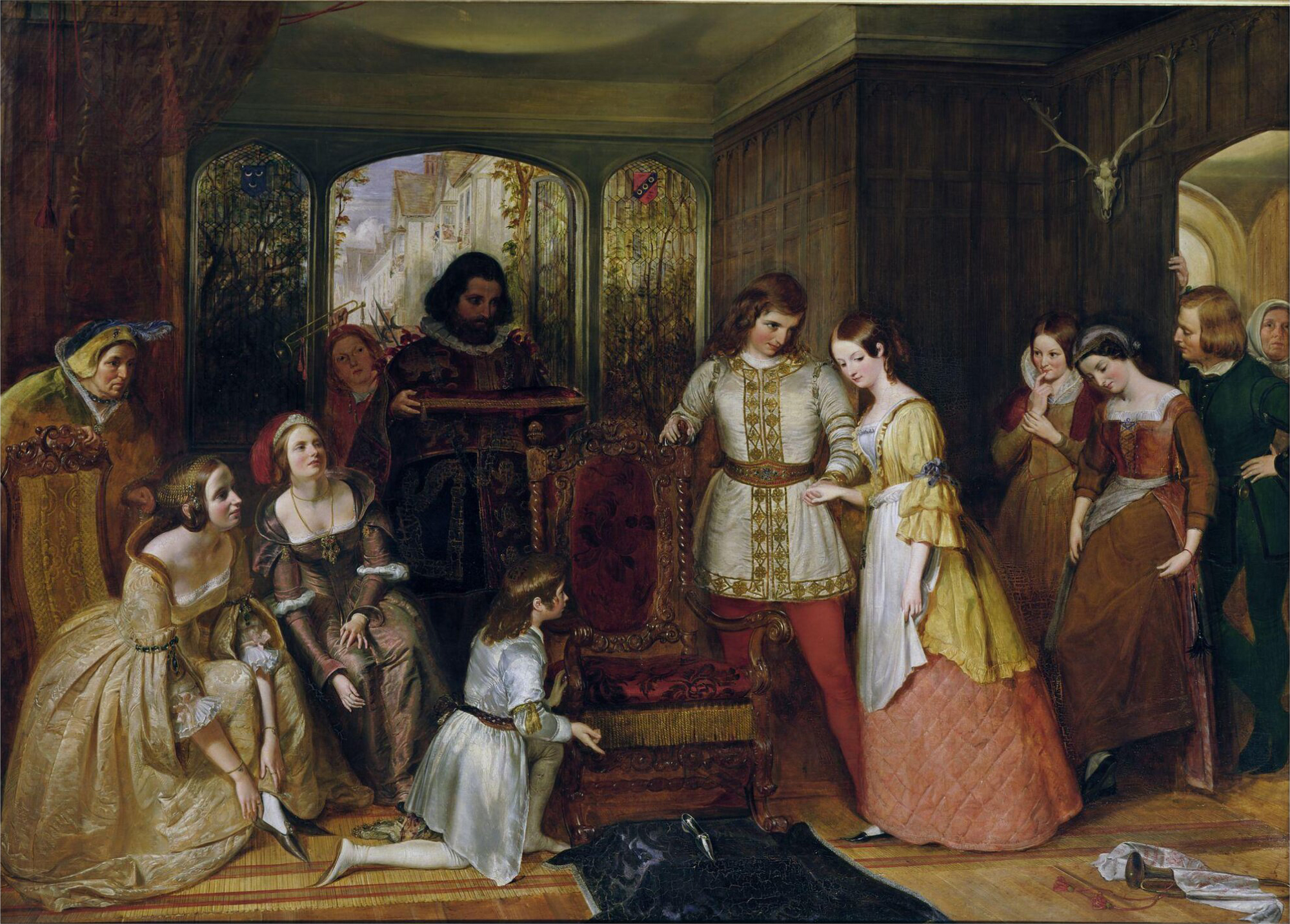
- Artist: Richard Redgrave
- Year: 1842
- Type: Oil on canvas, history painting
- Dimensions: 106.7 cm × 142.2 cm (42.0 in × 56.0 in)
- Location: Victoria and Albert Museum, London

Cinderella About to Try on the Glass Slipper is an 1842 oil painting by British artist Richard Redgrave. Inspired by the folk tale Cinderella, it depicts the moment the heroine is about to try on the glass slipper, to the disbelief of her mean stepsisters.

The painting was displayed at the Royal Academy Exhibition of 1842 held at the National Gallery in London. It was owned by the art collector John Sheepshanks, who donated it to the Victoria and Albert Museum in South Kensington as part of the Sheepshanks Gift in 1857.

== Bibliography ==
- Herrmann, Luke. Nineteenth Century British Painting. Charles de la Mare, 2000.
- Roe, Sonia. Oil Paintings in Public Ownership in the Victoria and Albert Museum. Public Catalogue Foundation, 2008.
