= The Hunted Stag =

Painting by Edwin Landseer

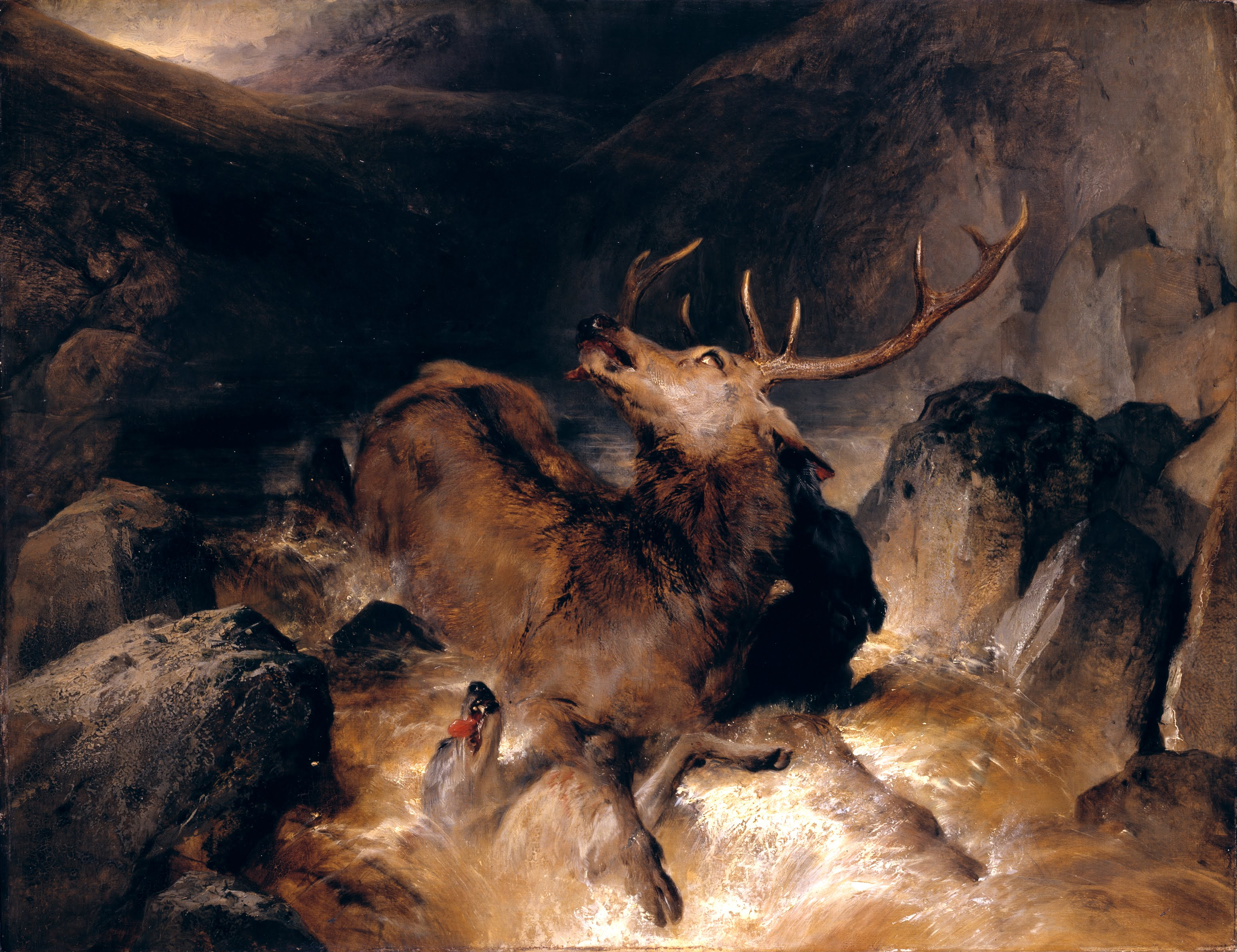
- Artist: Edwin Landseer
- Year: 1833
- Type: Oil on panel, genre painting
- Dimensions: 40.5 cm × 99.8 cm (15.9 in × 39.3 in)
- Location: Tate Britain; London

The Hunted Stag is an 1833 oil painting by the British artist Edwin Landseer. It shows a stag hunted by hounds in a mountain stream. It is the first in a series of works by Landseer featuring stags at bay. It is also known by the alternative title Deer and Deer Hounds in a Mountain Torrent.

The work was displayed at the Royal Academy Exhibition of 1833 at Somerset House in London. It received less attention than Landseer's other submission A Jack in Office, but was praised in The Athenaeum for its "truth exalted by feeling and skill". It was part of the Vernon Gift to the National Gallery in 1847. Today the painting is in the collection of the Tate Britain in Pimlico.

== Bibliography ==
- Ormond, Richard. Sir Edwin Landseer. Philadelphia Museum of Art, 1981.
