= Sheepshanks Gift =

Collection of artwork in London

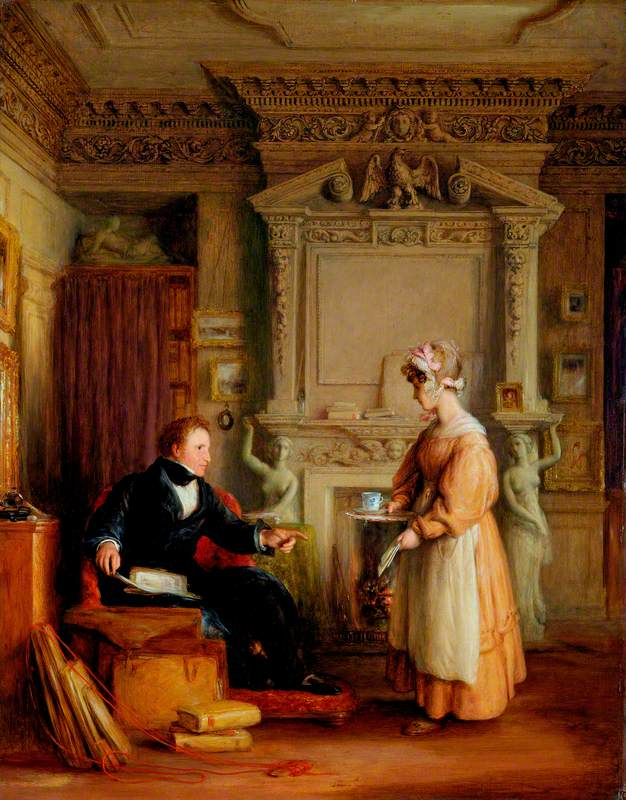
Interior with John Sheepshanks by William Mulready. It formed part of the gift in 1857

The Sheepshanks Gift was a major donation of artworks by the British art collector John Sheepshanks in 1857. It formed the basis of the collection of the Victoria and Albert Museum in South Kensington.

The Yorkshire-born Sheepshanks had made a fortune as a cloth manufacturer. He was a leading collector of contemporary British art of the late Regency and early Victorian era. He frequently purchased notable paintings at the Royal Academy's annual Summer Exhibition and at the rival British Institution. He amassed works by leading artists such as John Constable, J.M.W. Turner, Clarkson Stanfield, David Roberts, William Mulready, Charles Robert Leslie, and Edwin Landseer. Stylistically, his collection was dominated by the Romantic movement.

The National Gallery in London had been established in 1824 but initially only featured one work by a living British artist David Wilkie's The Village Holiday which was dominated by Old Masters. The newer Victoria and Albert Museum was constructed in South Kensington based on the profits of the 1851 Great Exhibition in Hyde Park. Sheepshanks' gift to the nation was allocated to the newer establishment. He set a number of conditions, particularly that his paintings should be that "the public, and especially the working classes, should have the advantage of seeing the collection on Sunday afternoons". The donation included 336 paintings, drawing and sketches. It was housed in a suite of three rooms specially constructed to showcase the collection.

== Gallery ==
The Refusal by David Wilkie, 1814

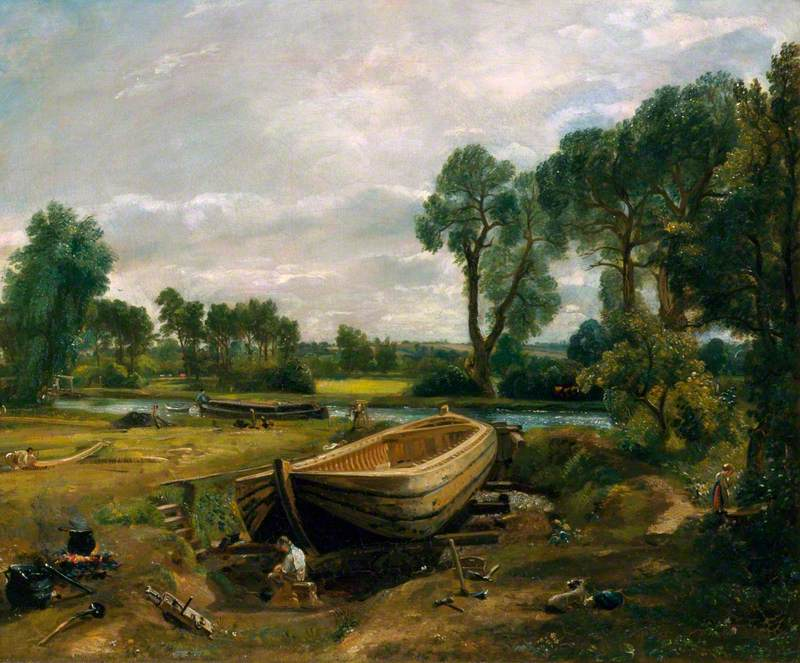
Boat-Building Near Flatford Mill by John Constable, 1815

Water Meadows near Salisbury by John Constable, 1820

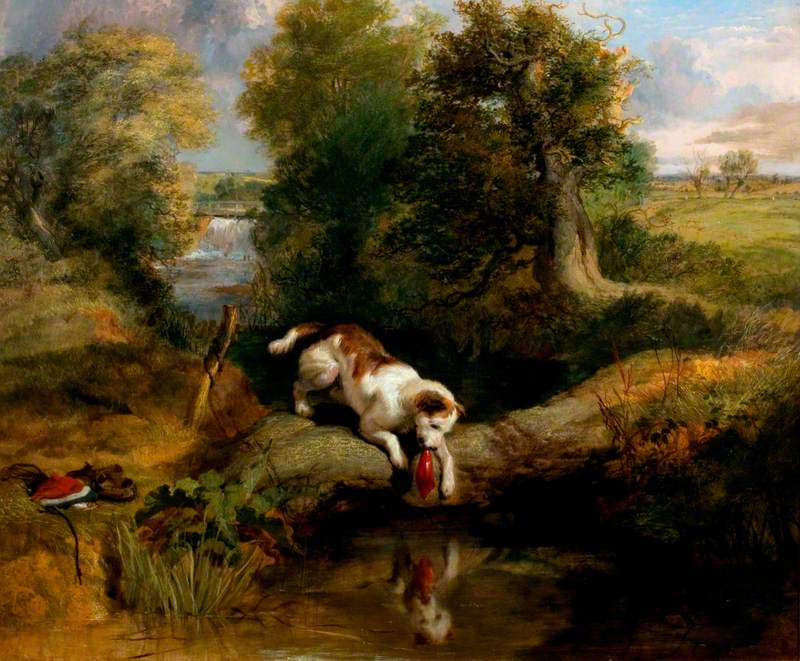
The Dog and the Shadow by Edwin Landseer, 1821

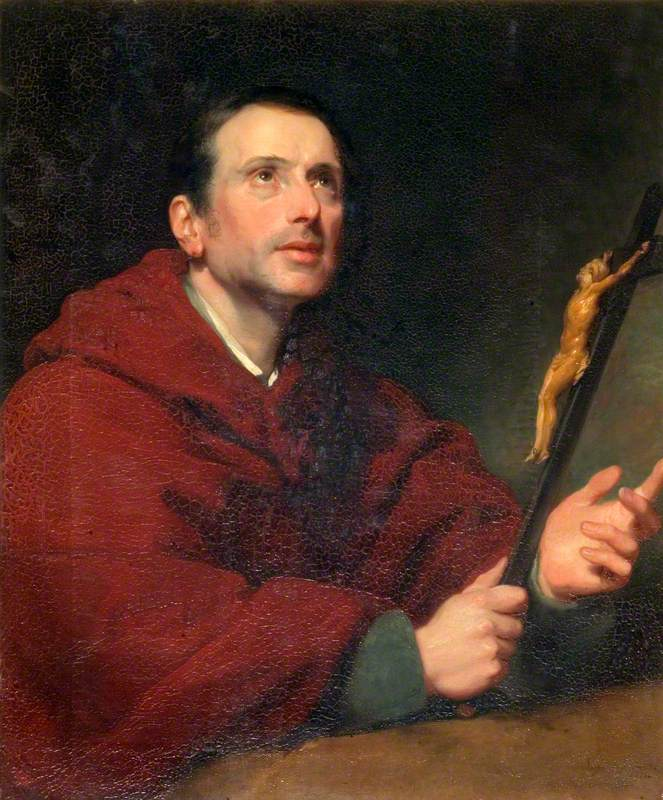
Devotion by Margaret Sarah Carpenter, 1821

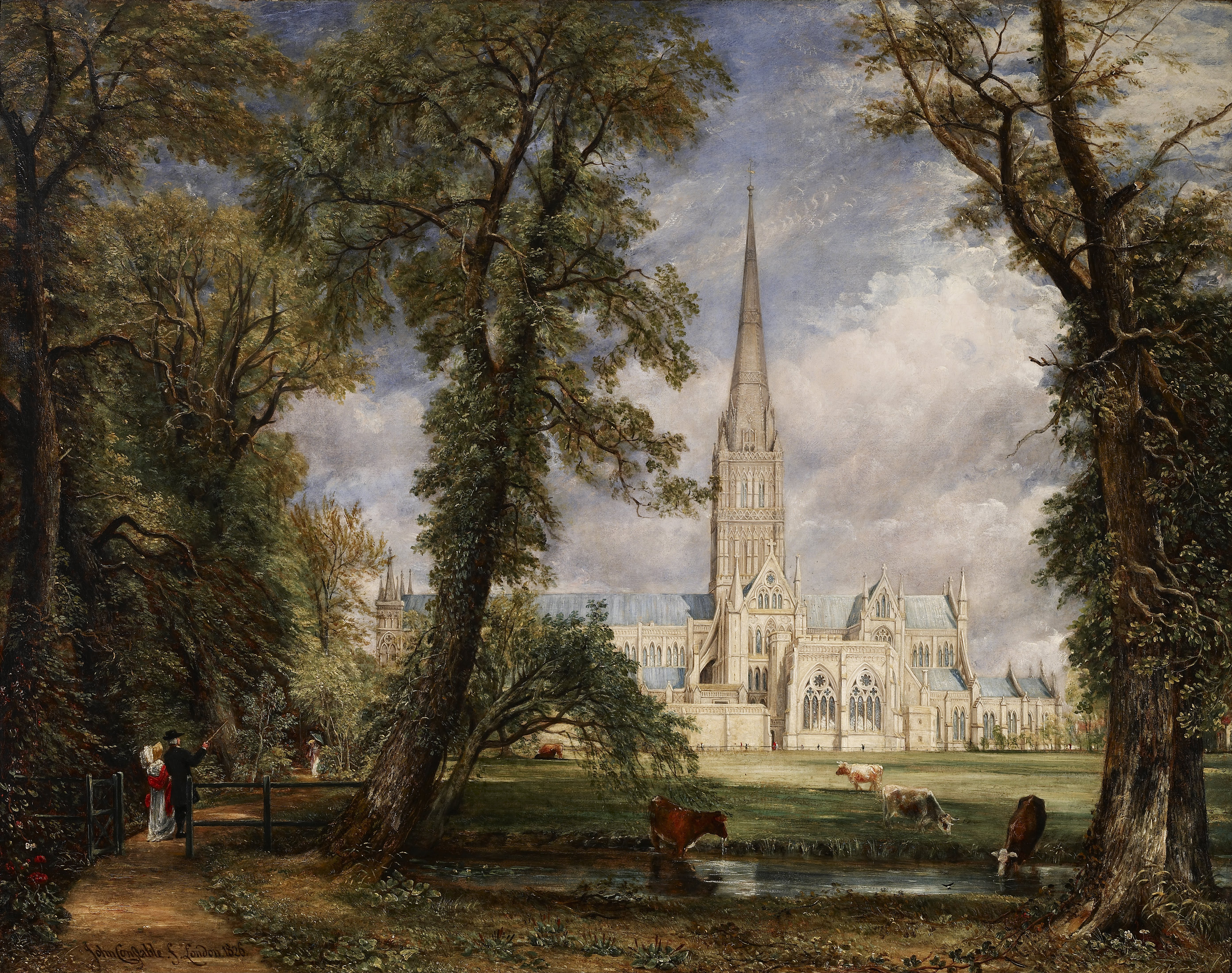
Salisbury Cathedral from the Bishop's Grounds by John Constable, 1823

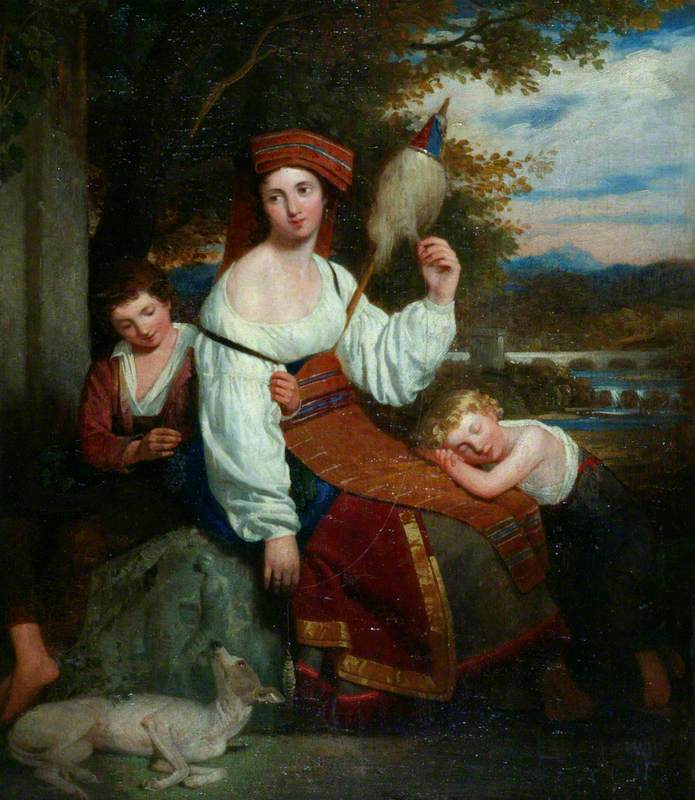
An Italian Contadina and Her Children by Charles Lock Eastlake, 1823

Hampstead Heath, Branch Hill Pond by John Constable, 1828

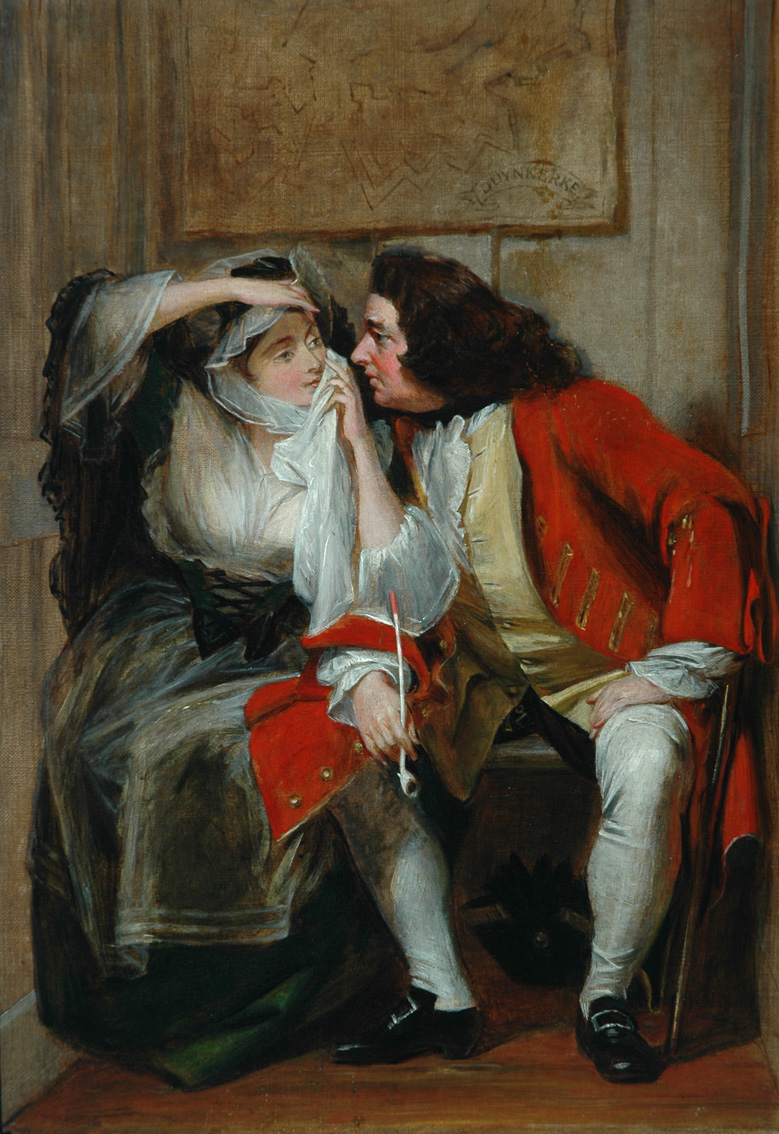
My Uncle Toby and the Widow Wadman by Charles Robert Leslie, 1831

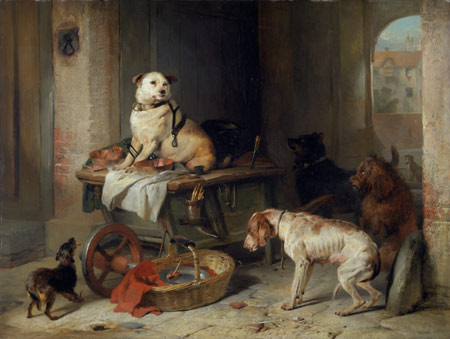
A Jack in Office by Edwin Landseer, 1833

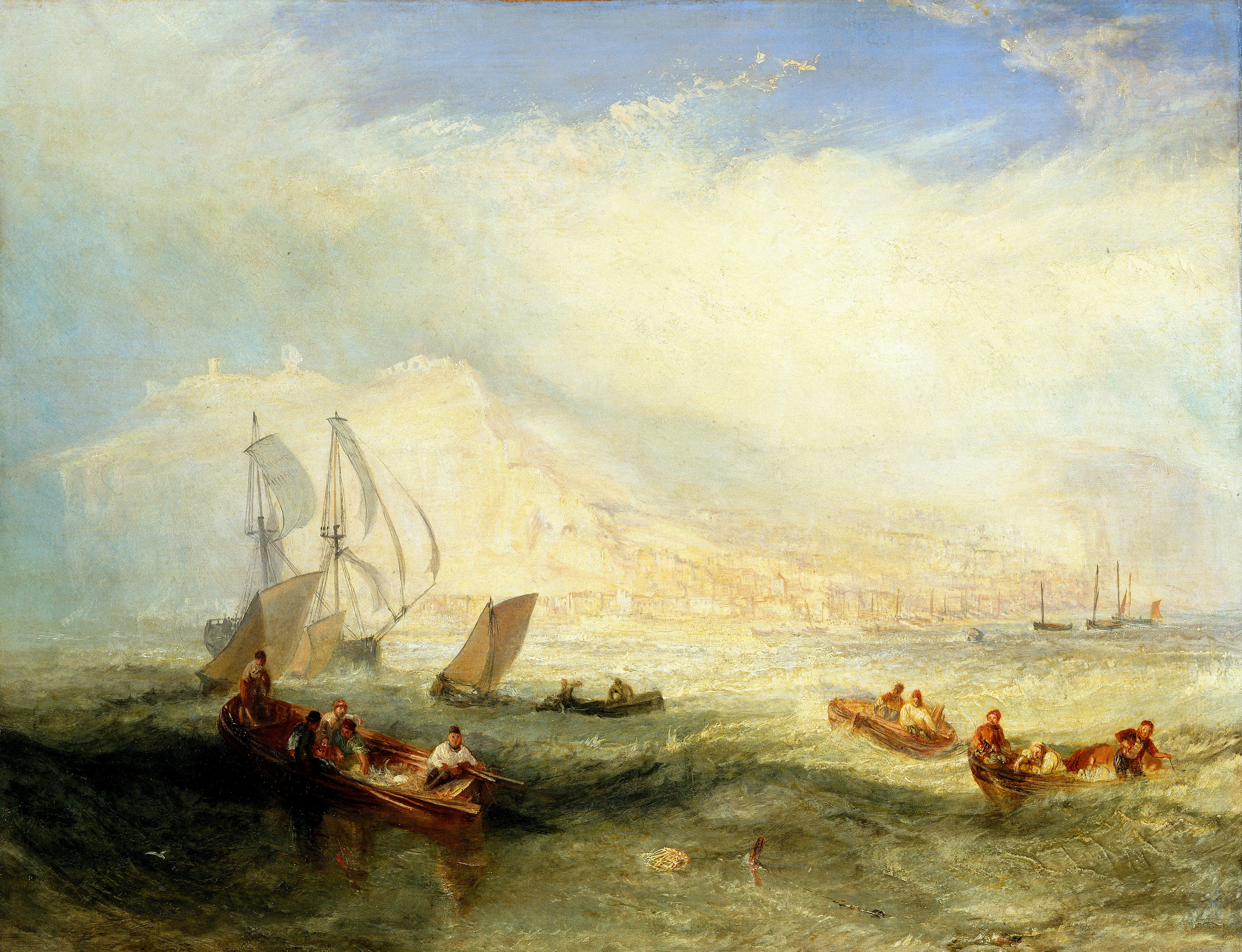
Line Fishing, Off Hastings by J.M.W. Turner, 1835

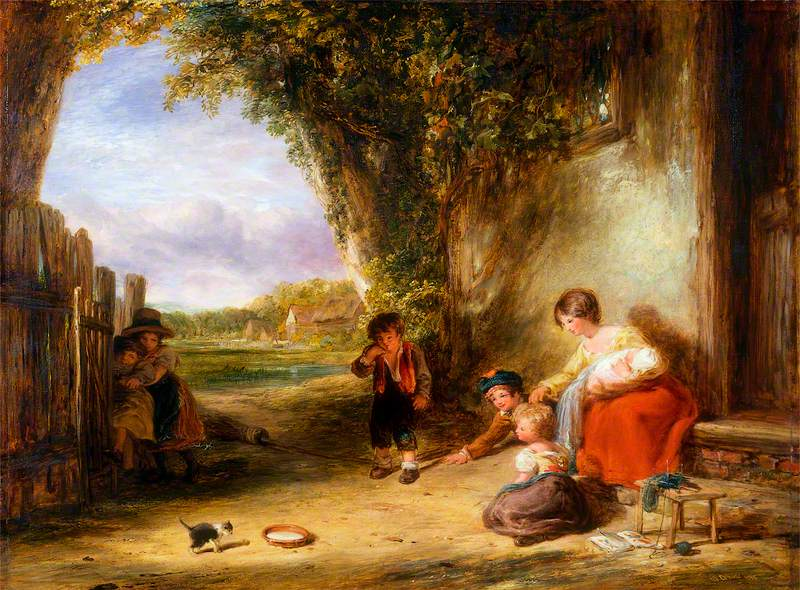
The Stray Kitten by William Collins, 1835

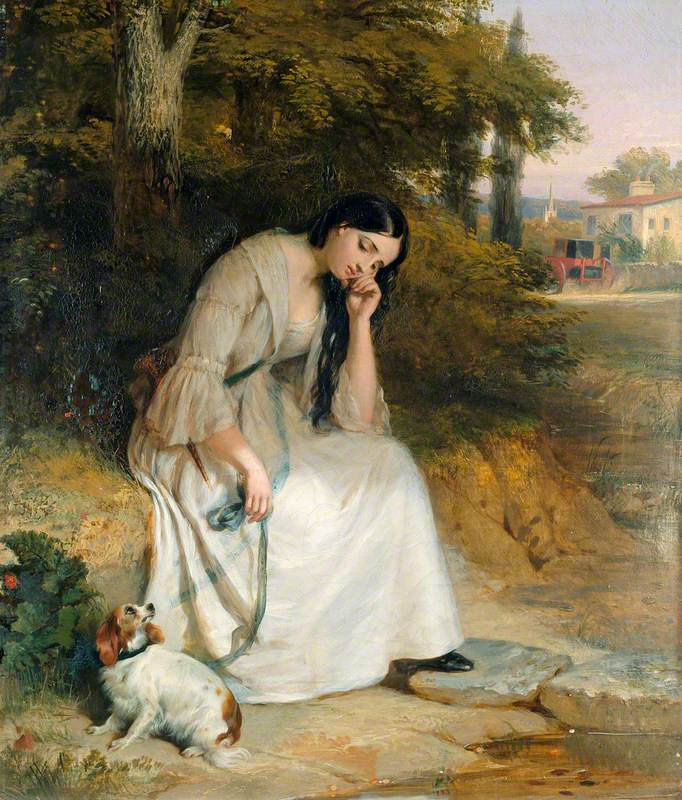
Maria by Charles Landseer, 1836

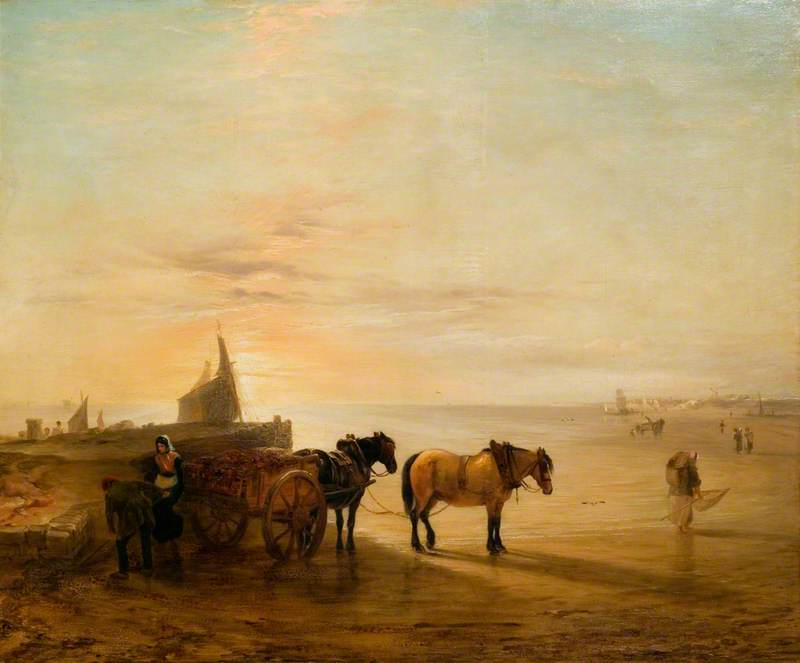
Gathering Seaweed by Frederick Richard Lee, 1836

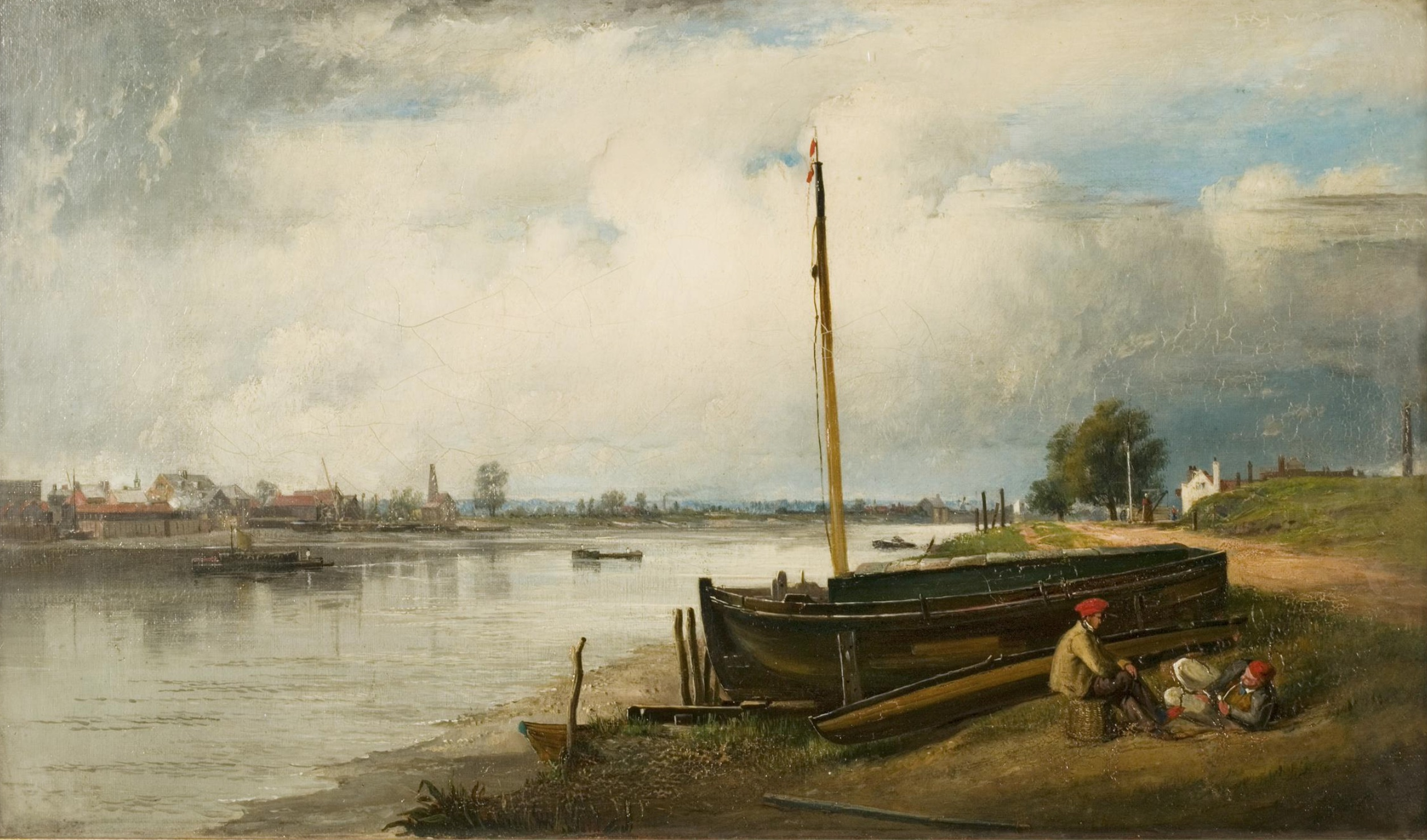
The Thames from Millbank by Richard Redgrave, 1836

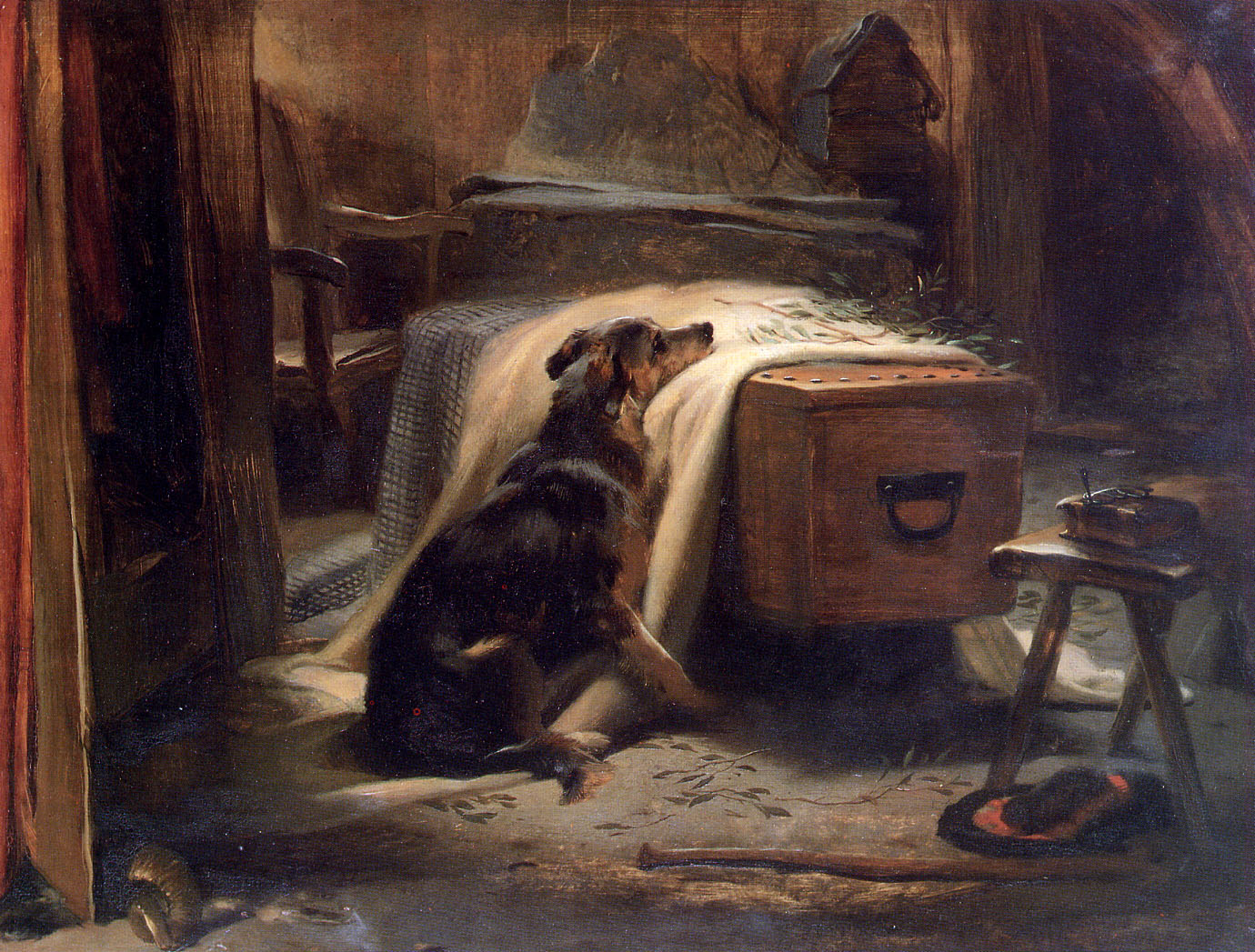
The Old Shepherd's Chief Mourner by Edwin Landseer, 1837

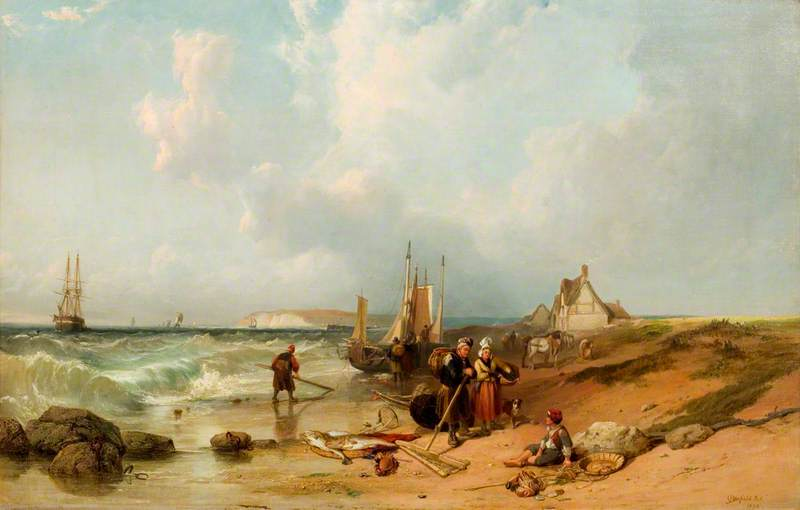
Sands near Boulogne by Clarkson Stanfield, 1838

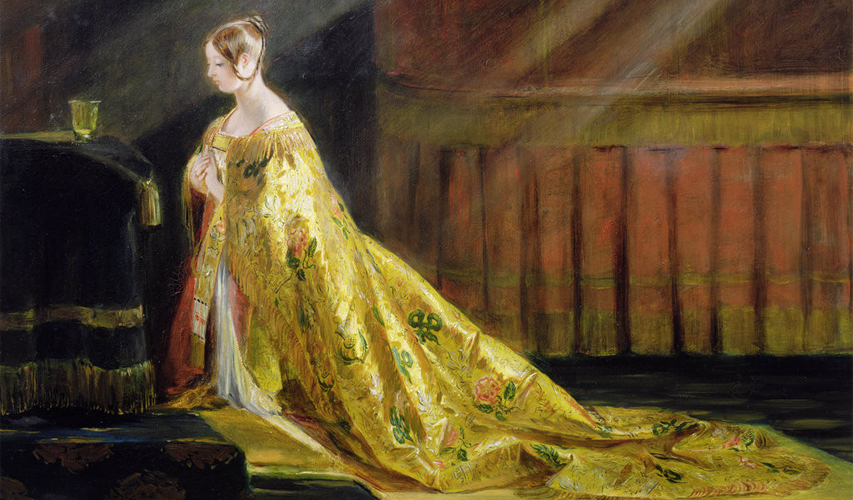
Queen Victoria in Her Coronation Robes by Charles Robert Leslie, 1838

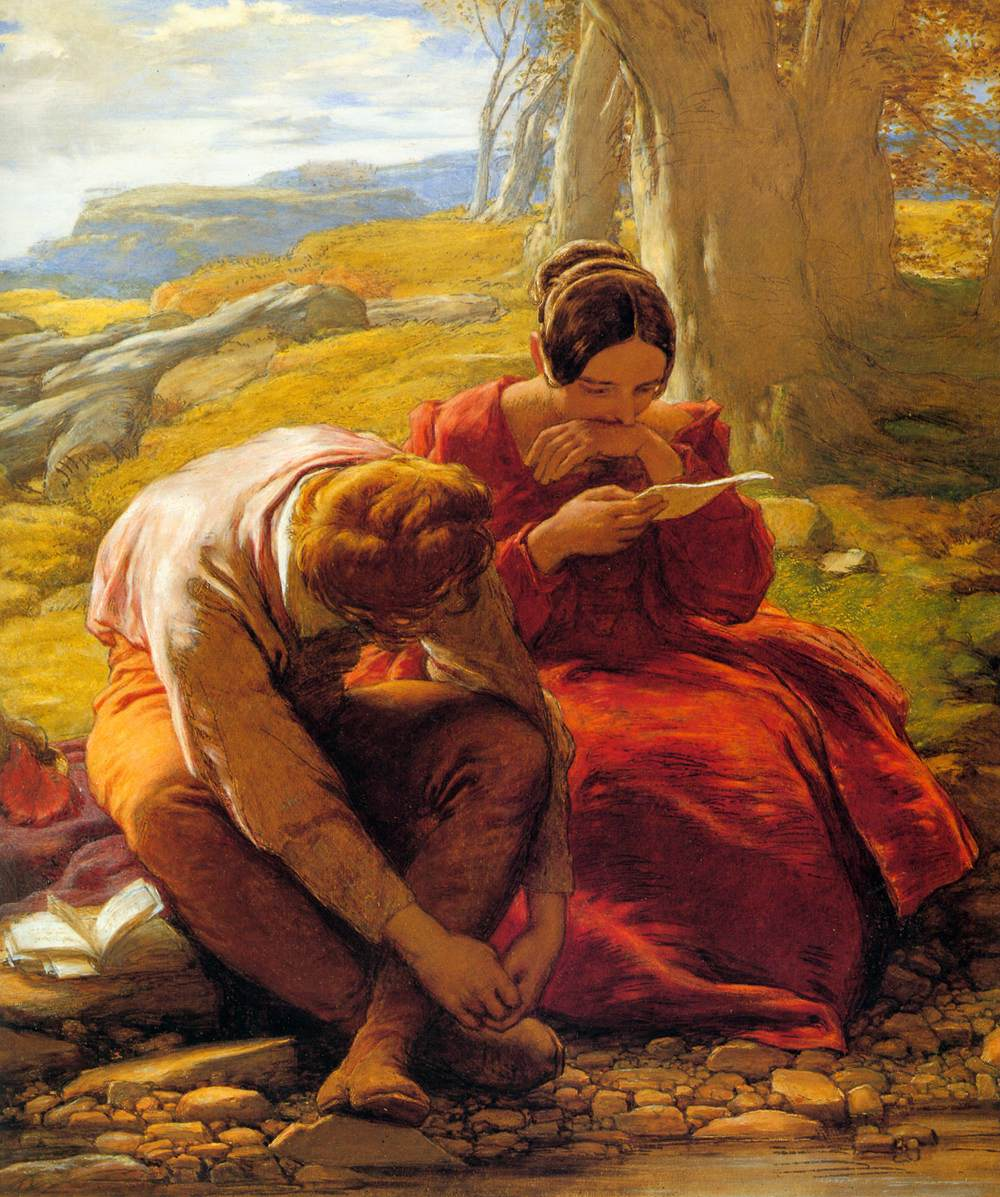
The Sonnet by William Mulready, 1839

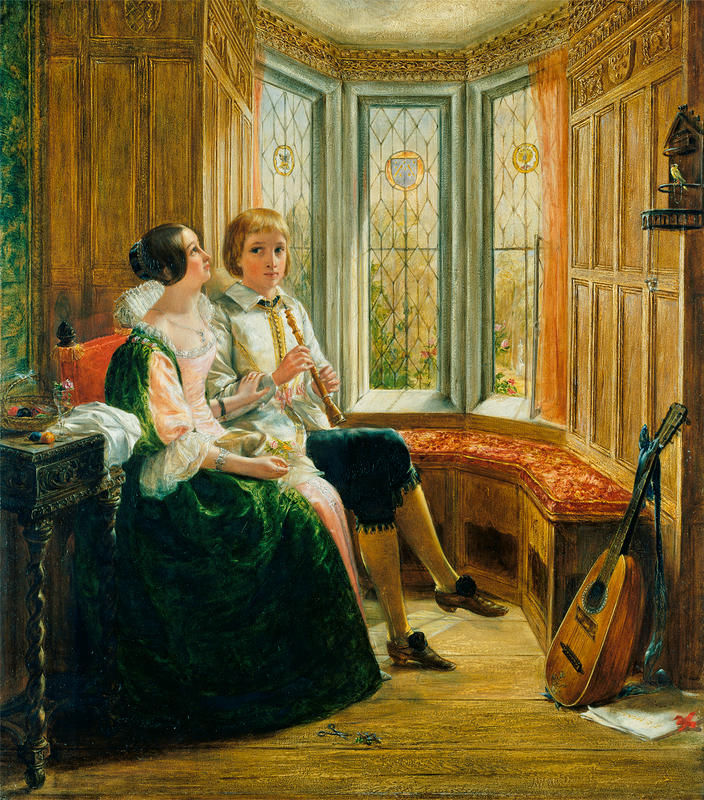
The Rival Performers by John Calcott Horsley, 1839

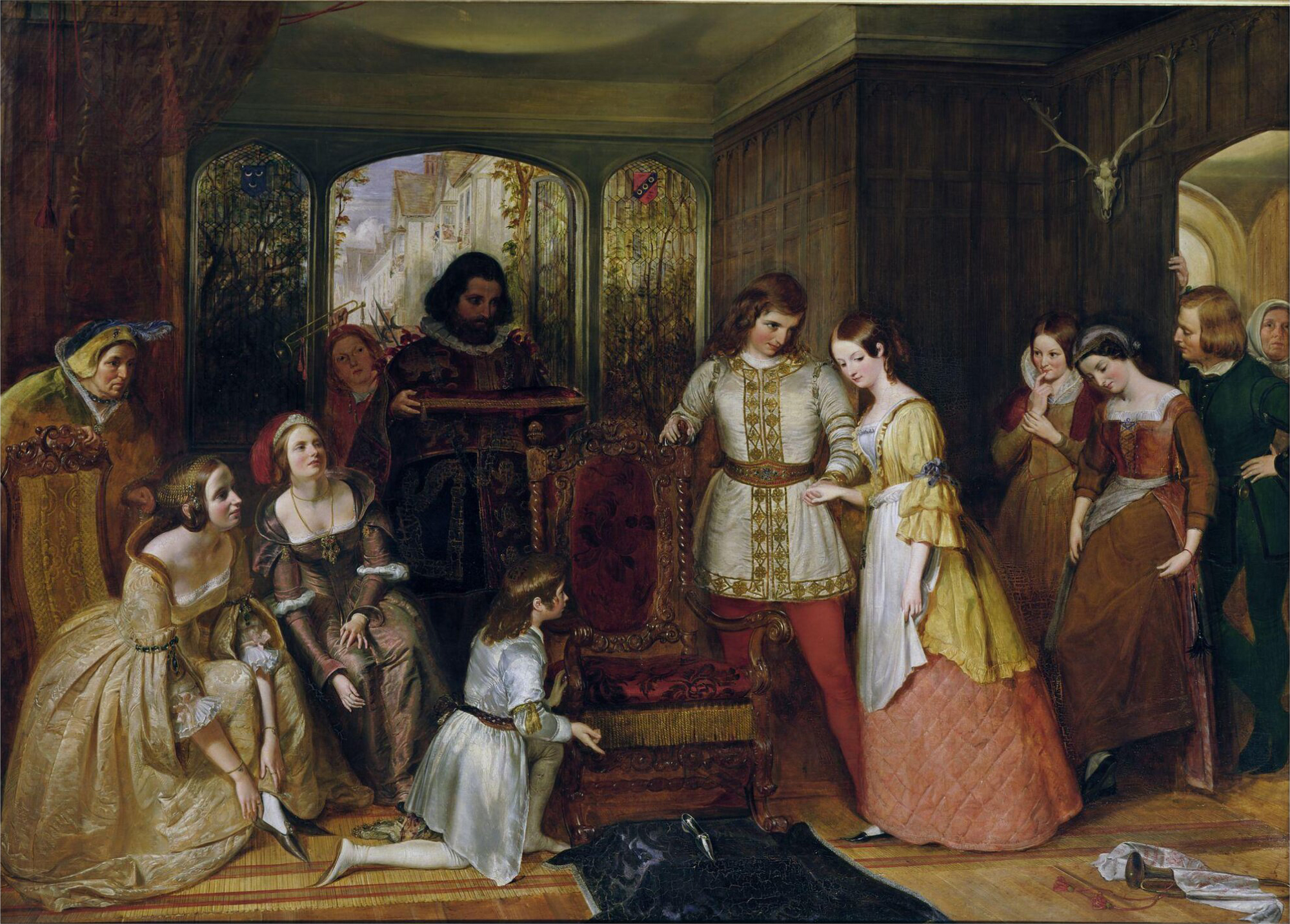
Cinderella About to Try on the Glass Slipper by Richard Redgrave, 1842

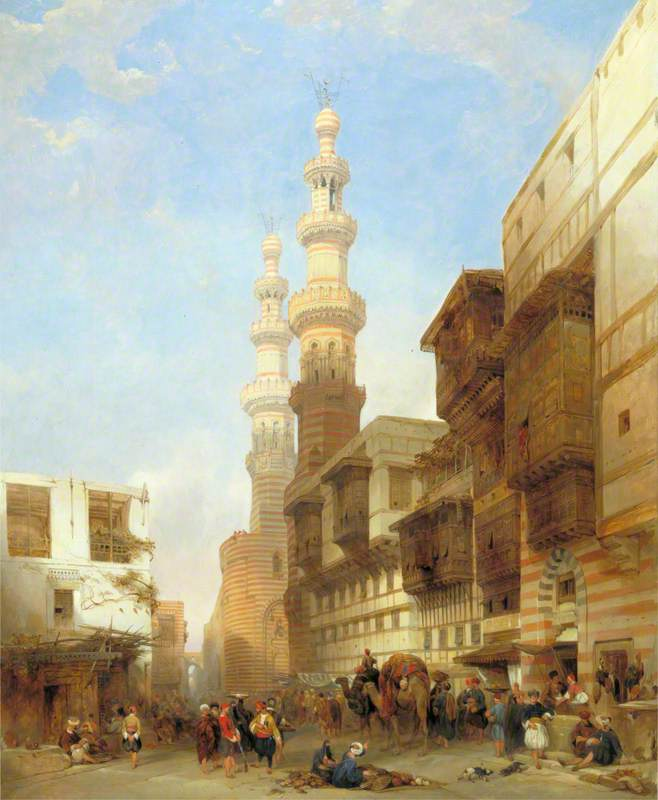
The Gate of Metawaley by David Roberts, 1843

Seaford, Sussex by William Collins, 1844

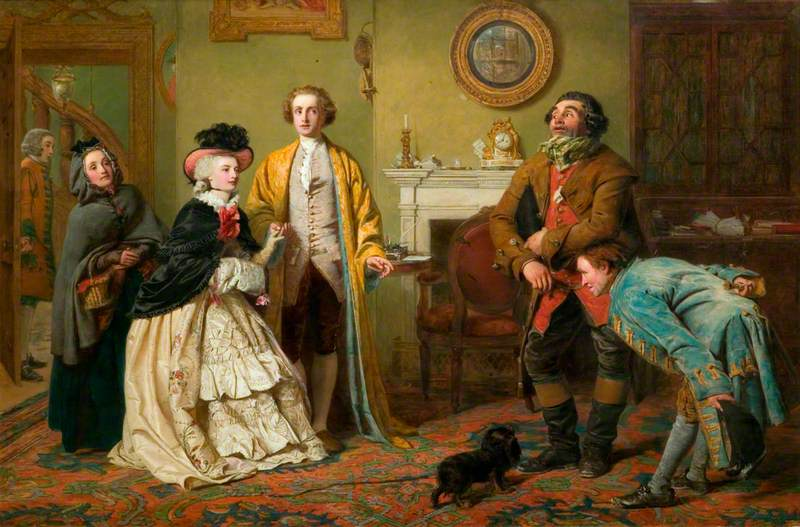
Mr Honeywood Introduces the Bailiffs to Miss Richland as His Friends by William Powell Frith, 1850

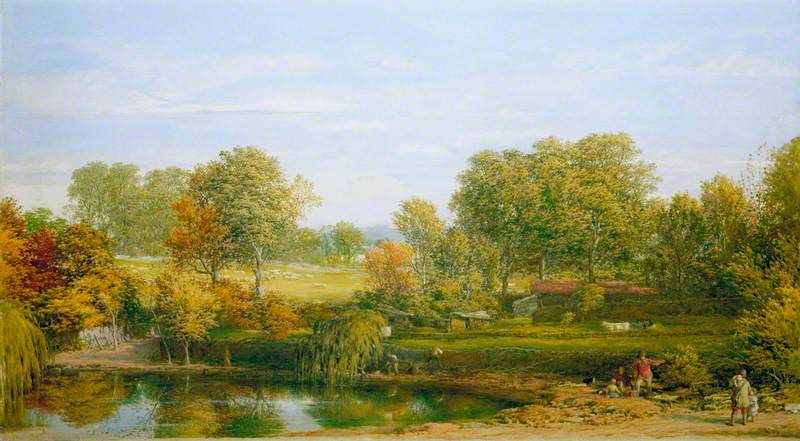
Blackheath Park by William Mulready, 1852

== See also ==
- Vernon Gift, an 1847 donation of British art to the National Gallery
- Turner Bequest, an 1851 donation enacted in 1856
- Jones Bequest, another major gift of artworks to the Victoria and Albert Museum

== Bibliography ==
- Hamilton, James. A Strange Business:Making Art and Money in Nineteenth-Century Britain. Atlantic Books, 2014.
- Noon, Patrick & Bann, Stephen. Constable to Delacroix: British Art and the French Romantics. Tate, 2003.
- Roe, Sonia. Oil Paintings in Public Ownership in the Victoria and Albert Museum. Public Catalogue Foundation, 2008.
- Taylor, Brandon. Art for the Nation: Exhibitions and the London Public, 1747–2001. Manchester University Press, 1999.
