= Branch Hill, Hampstead =

Street in London, England

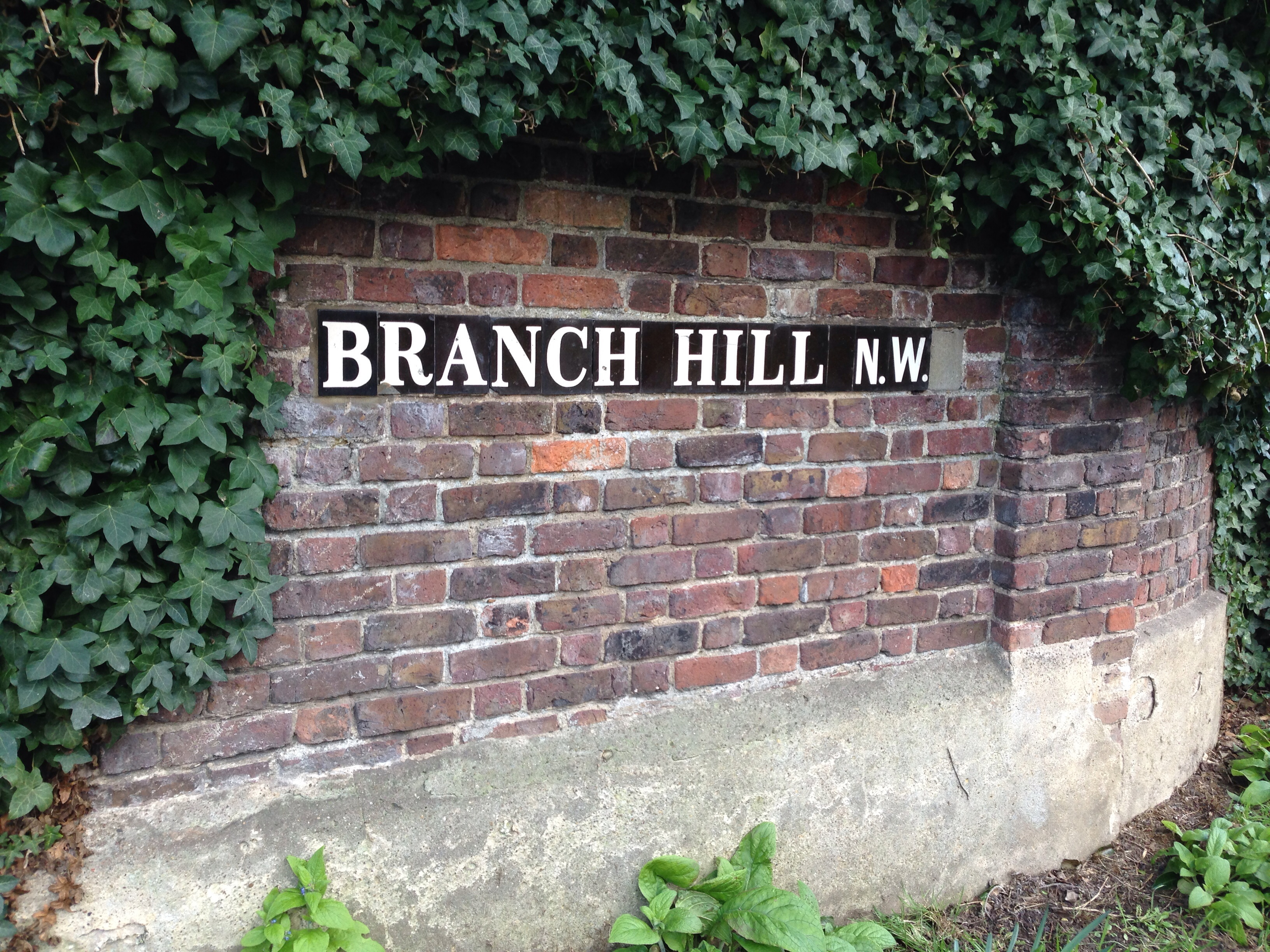
Historic street sign.

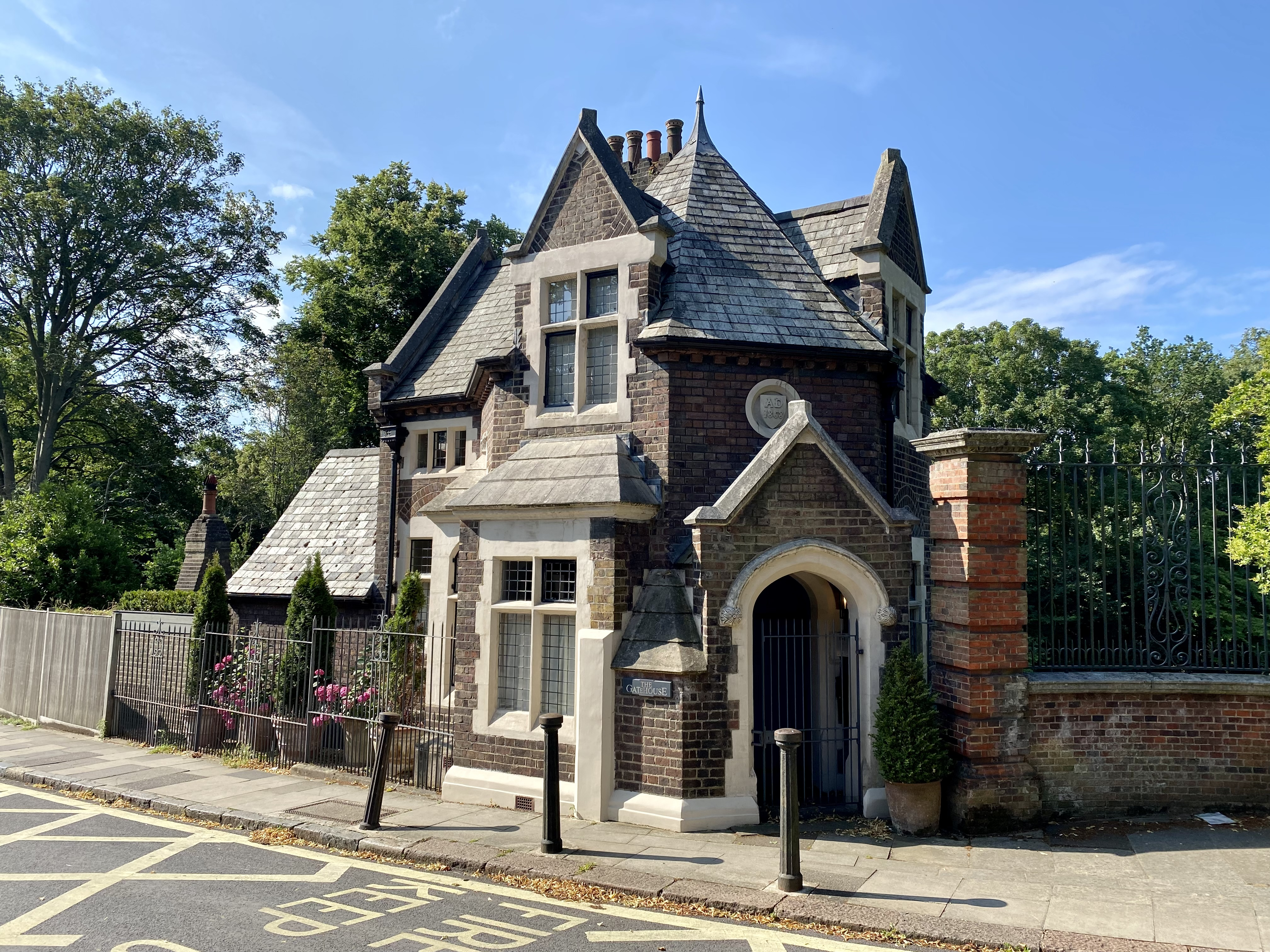
The gatehouse to Branch Hill Lodge.

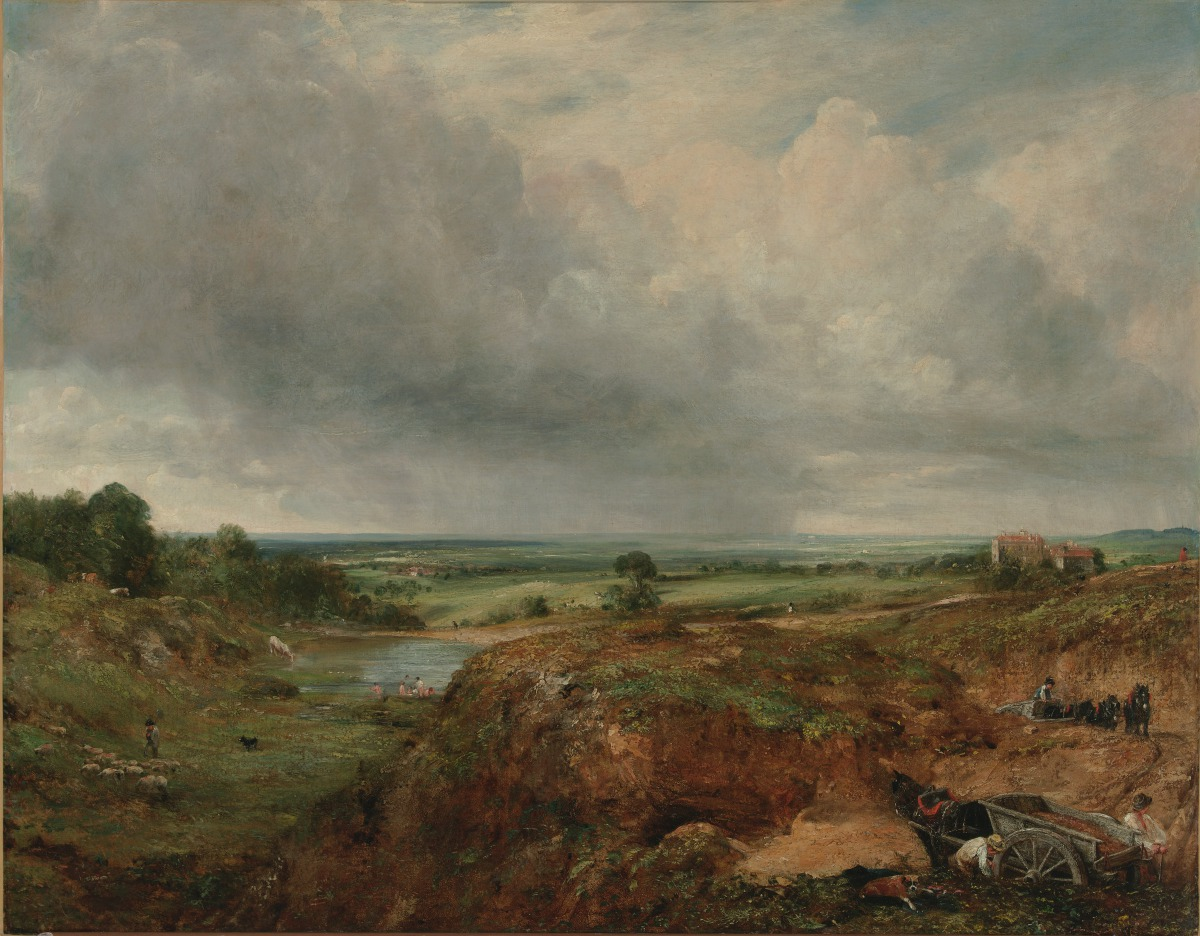
Branch Hill Pond by John Constable, 1825.

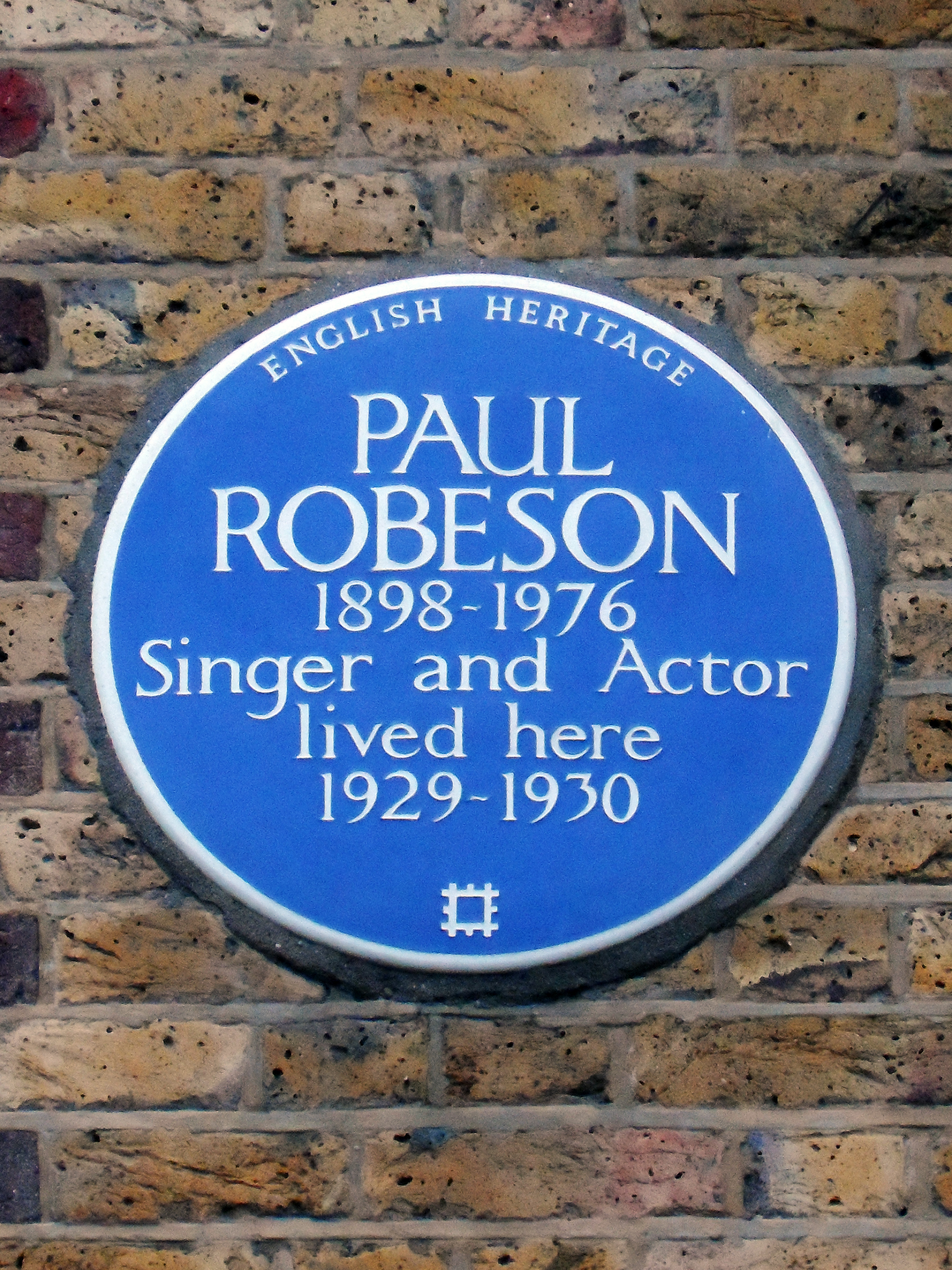
Blue plaque for Paul Robeson.

Branch Hill is a street in Hampstead. Located in the London Borough of Camden it is named after a hill on Hampstead Heath and runs adjacent to the heath between Frognal Rise and West Heath Road. Branch Hill, then largely open countryside, was a favourite landscape of the artist John Constable and he painted it on a number of occasions. Branch Hill Pond is located close to the junction with West Heath Road, while it dried up in the early twentieth century recent efforts have been made to restore it.

It was known by the name from the early eighteenth century and references the old branch route to Childs Hill. Several prominent properties off Branch Hill have included Oak Hill Lodge, the Salt Box and Branch Hill Lodge. The latter, built in 1745, was rebuilt in the Edwardian Era. In 1965 it was taken over by the council while the grounds were used for construction of the modernist Branch Hill Estate.

A blue plaque commemorates the former residence of singer and actor Paul Robeson. The 1864 gatehouse for Branch Hill Lodge is now Grade II listed. In 2010 the Branch Hill Estate was also Grade II listed.

== Bibliography ==
- Bebbington, Gillian. London Street Names. Batsford, 1972.
- Cherry, Bridget & Pevsner, Nikolaus. London 4: North. Yale University Press, 2002.
- Wade, Christopher. The Streets of Hampstead. Camden History Society, 2000.
