= Richard Redgrave =

English painter

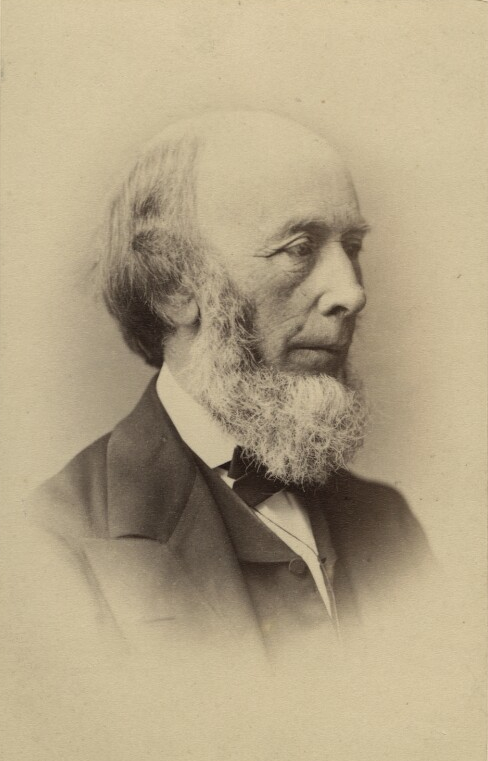
- Richard Redgrave, in a carte de visite (1860s)
- Born: 30 April 1804; London, England
- Died: 14 December 1888 (aged 84); London, England
- Occupation: English painter

Richard Redgrave RA (30 April 1804 – 14 December 1888) was an English landscape artist, genre painter, author, and administrator.

== Early life ==
He was born in Pimlico, London, at 2 Belgrave Terrace, the second son of William Redgrave, and younger brother of Samuel Redgrave. While employed in his father's manufacturing firm, he visited the British Museum to make drawings of the marble sculptures there. His work The River Brent, near Hanwell of 1825 saw him admitted to the Royal Academy schools the next year. He left his father's firm in 1830 and began to make a living teaching art.

== Career ==
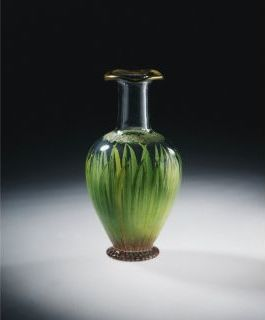
Well Spring Carafe, 1847–1851 designed by Richard Redgrave V&A Museum no. 4503-1901

He worked at first as a designer. He was elected an Associate in 1840 and an Academician in 1851 (retired, 1882). His Gulliver on the Farmer's Table (1837) made his reputation as a painter. He became an assiduous painter of landscape and genre; his best pictures being Country Cousins (1848), Olivia's Return to her Parents (1839), The Sempstress (1844) and A Well-spring in the Forest (1877). Redgrave held three important exhibitions at the Royal Academy and one at Royal Society of Painter-Etchers and Engravers.

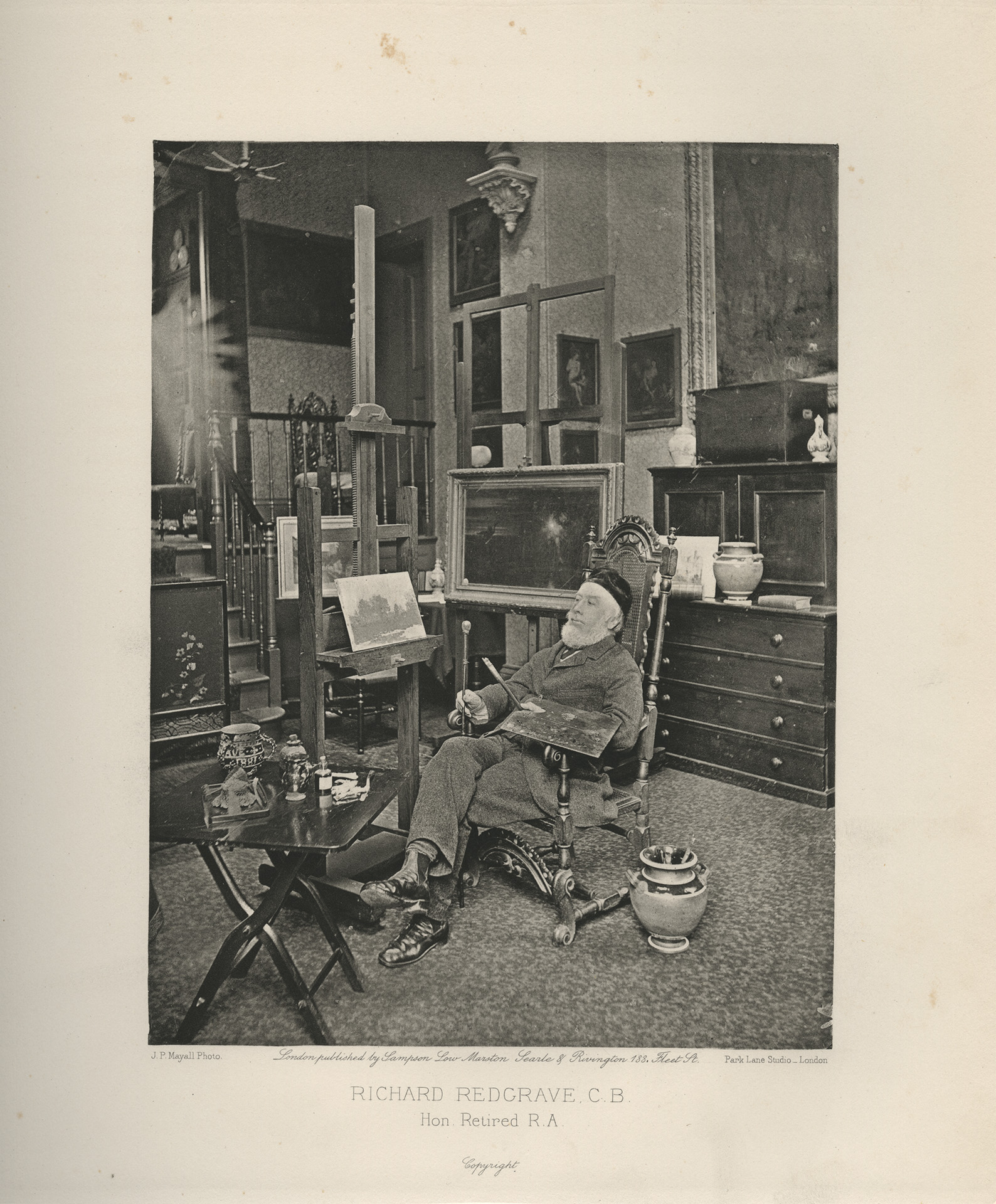
Richard Redgrave by J. P. Mayall from Artists at Home, photogravure, published 1884, Department of Image Collections, National Gallery of Art Library, Washington, DC

He began in 1847 a connection with the Government School of Design, as botanical lecturer and teacher, he became head-master in 1848, and art superintendent in 1852. He was inspector-general for art at the Science and Art Department in 1857. The first Keeper of Paintings at South Kensington Museum, he was greatly instrumental in the establishment of this institution, and he claimed the credit of having secured the Sheepshanks and Ellison gifts for the nation. Redgrave received the cross of the Legion of Honour after serving on the executive committee of the British section of the Paris Exhibition of 1855. The income provided for an impressive house at Hyde Park Gate, overlooking the park, in one of the most prestigious addresses in London. His children Evelyn Leslie Redgrave and Frances M Redgrave were celebrated painters.

He was surveyor of crown pictures from 1856–1880, during which period he produced a 34-volume catalogue detailing the pictures at Windsor Castle, Buckingham Palace, Hampton Court, and other royal residences.

Redgrave and his brother Samuel were the co-authors of the influential A Century of Painters of the English School, published in 1866, he also wrote also An Elementary Manual of Colour, 1853.

== Later life ==
External videos
- Redgrave's The Sempstress, Smarthistory

He was offered, but declined, a knighthood in 1869.

He died at 84 Hyde Park Gate, Kensington, London, on 14 December 1888 and is buried in Brompton Cemetery.

== Gallery ==
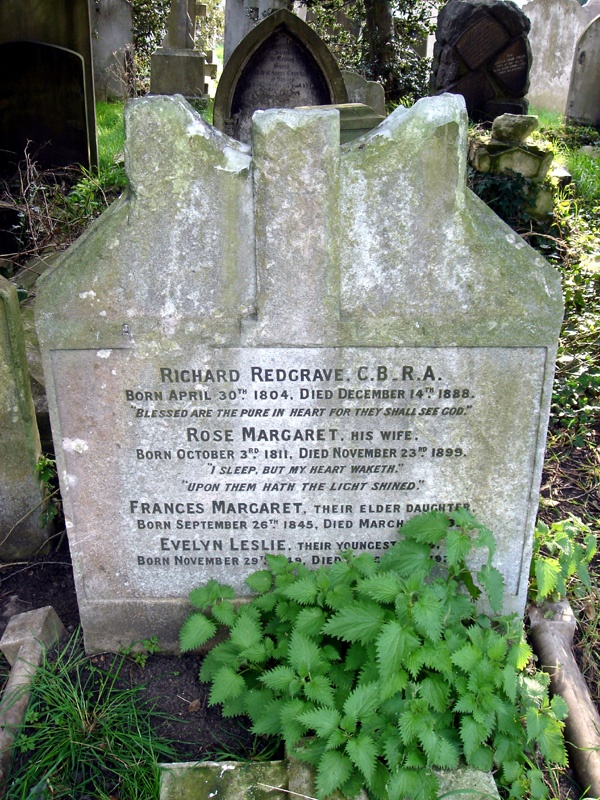
Funerary monument, Brompton Cemetery

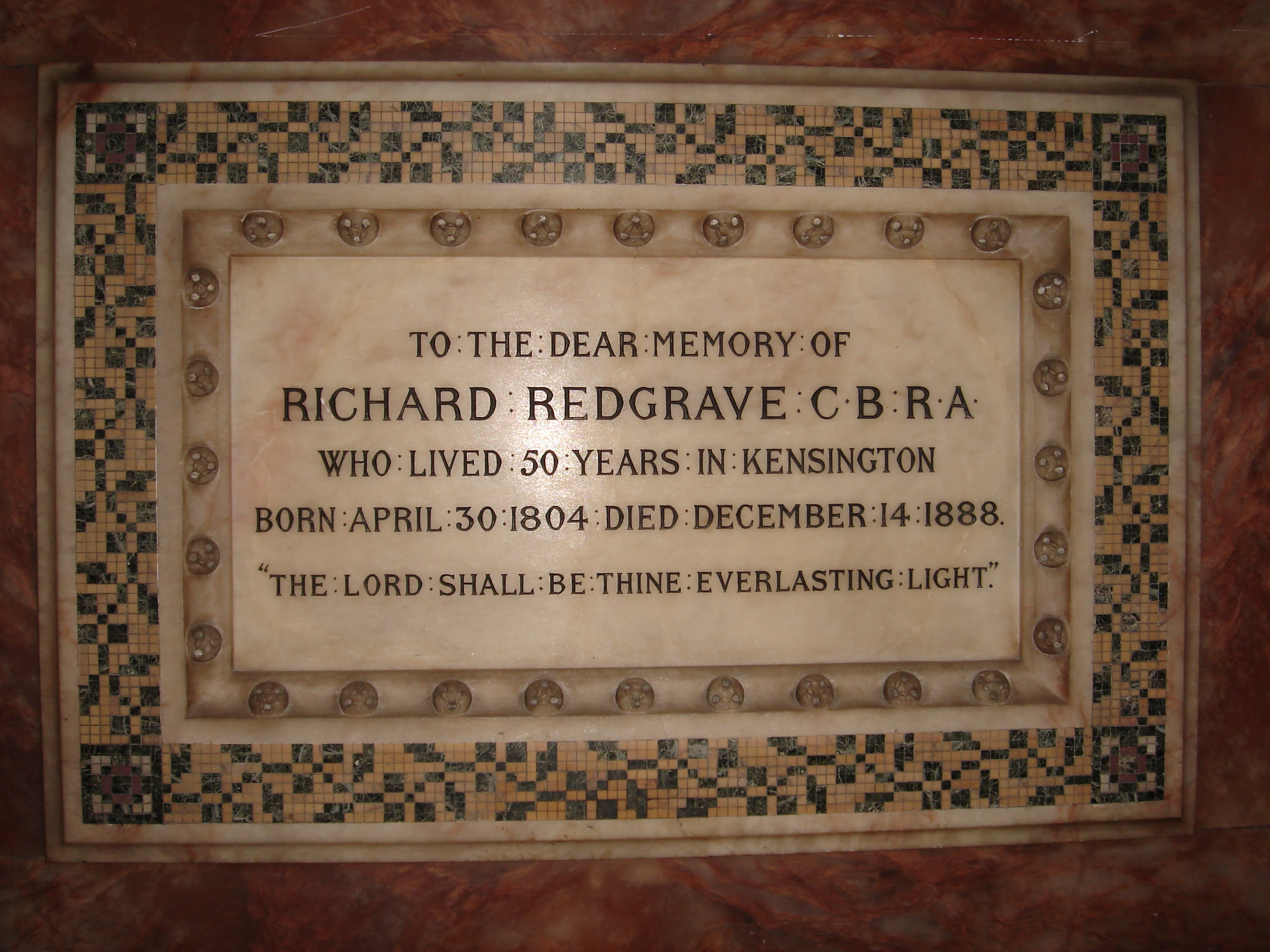
Memorial in St Mary Abbots, Kensington

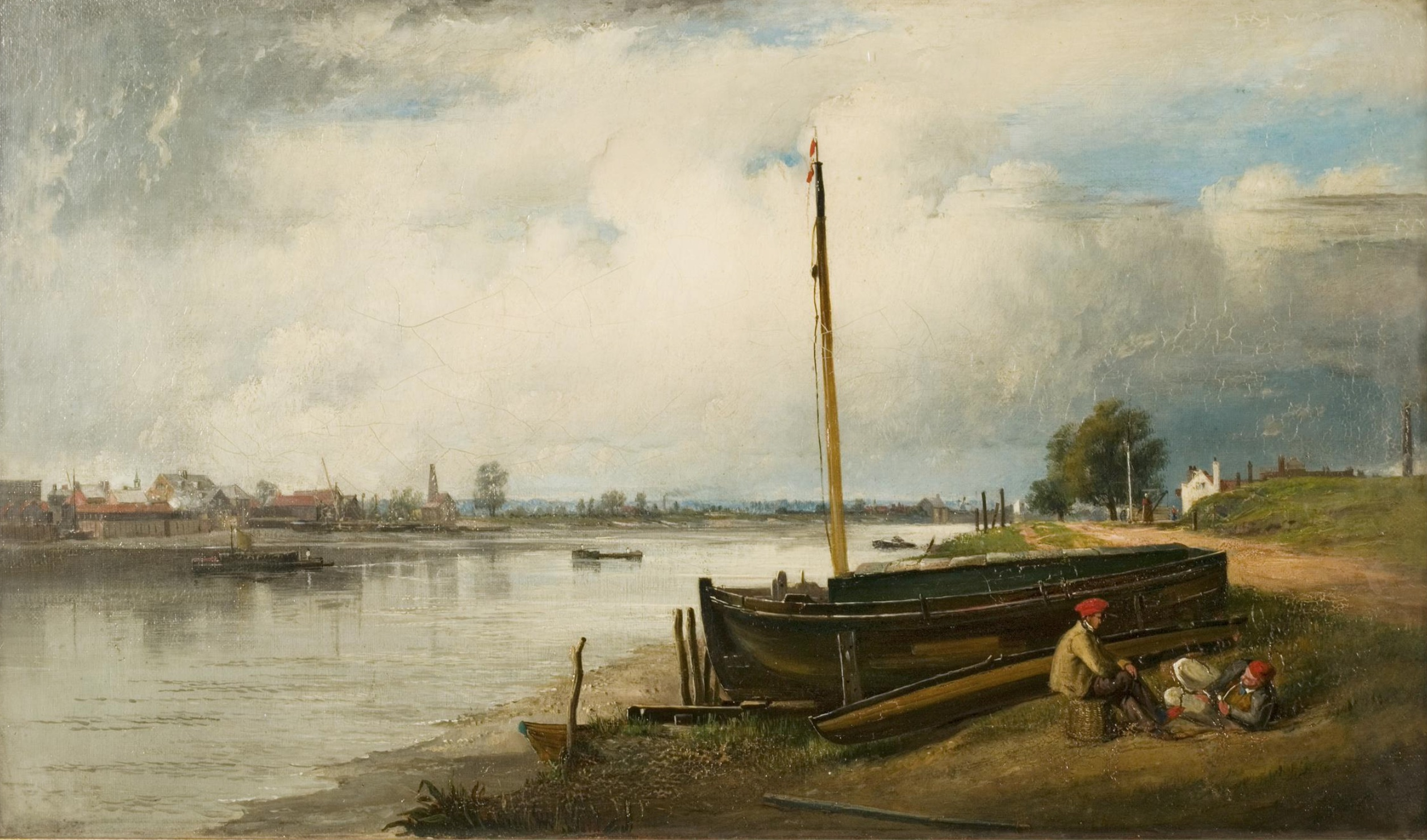
The Thames from Millbank, 1836

Bad News from Sea, 1842

Ophelia Weaving Her Garlands, 1842

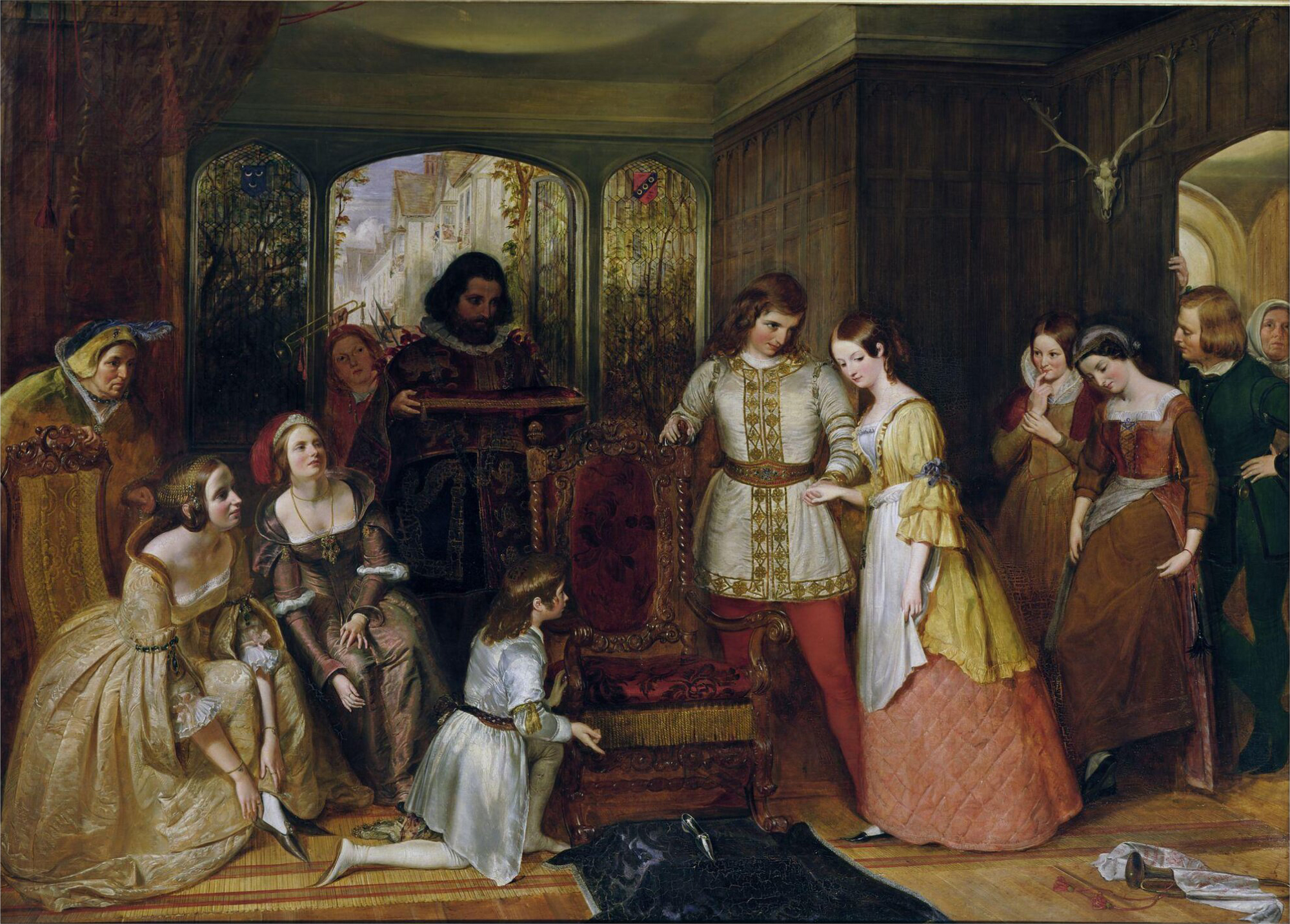
Cinderella About to Try on the Glass Slipper, 1842

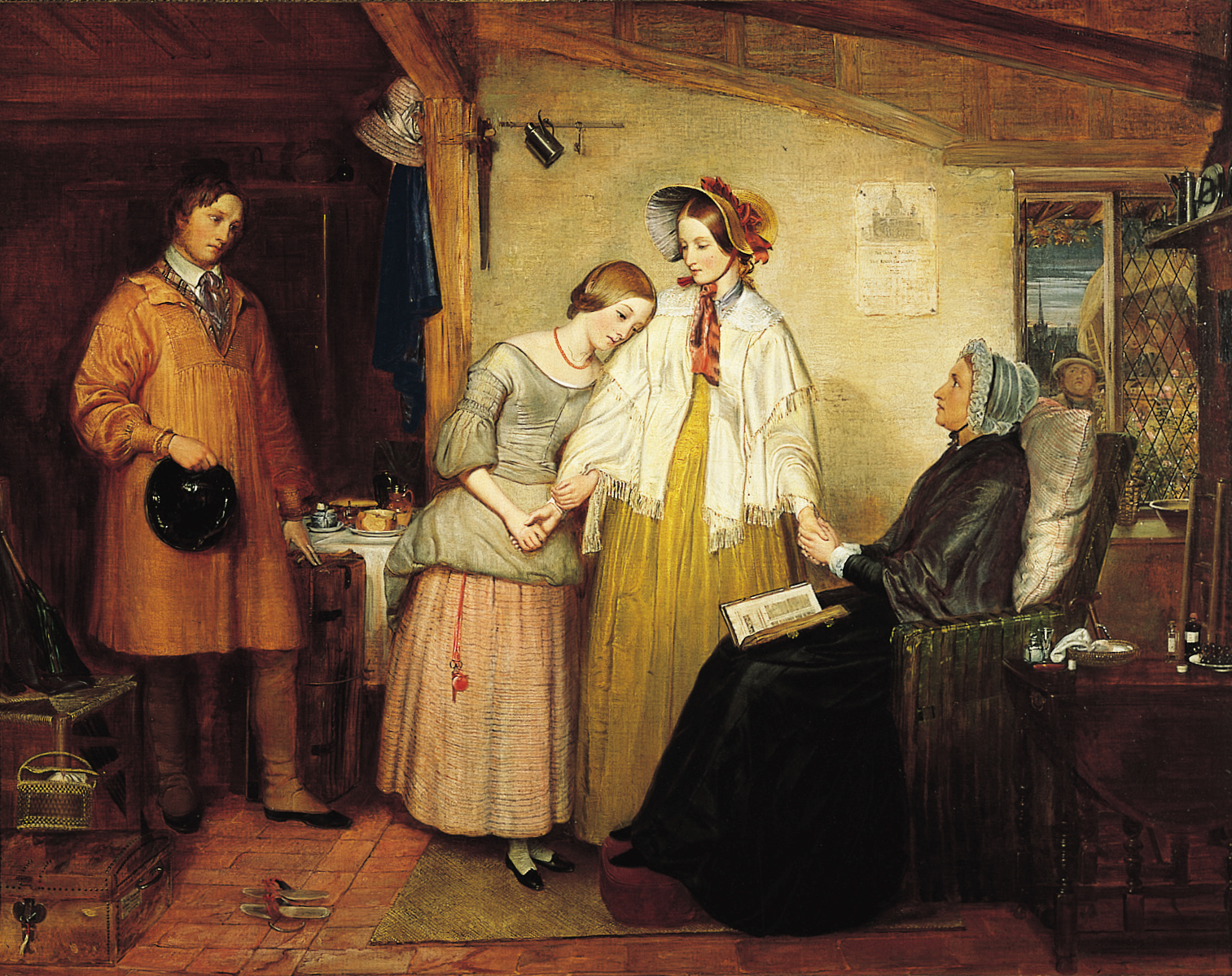
Going into Service, 1843

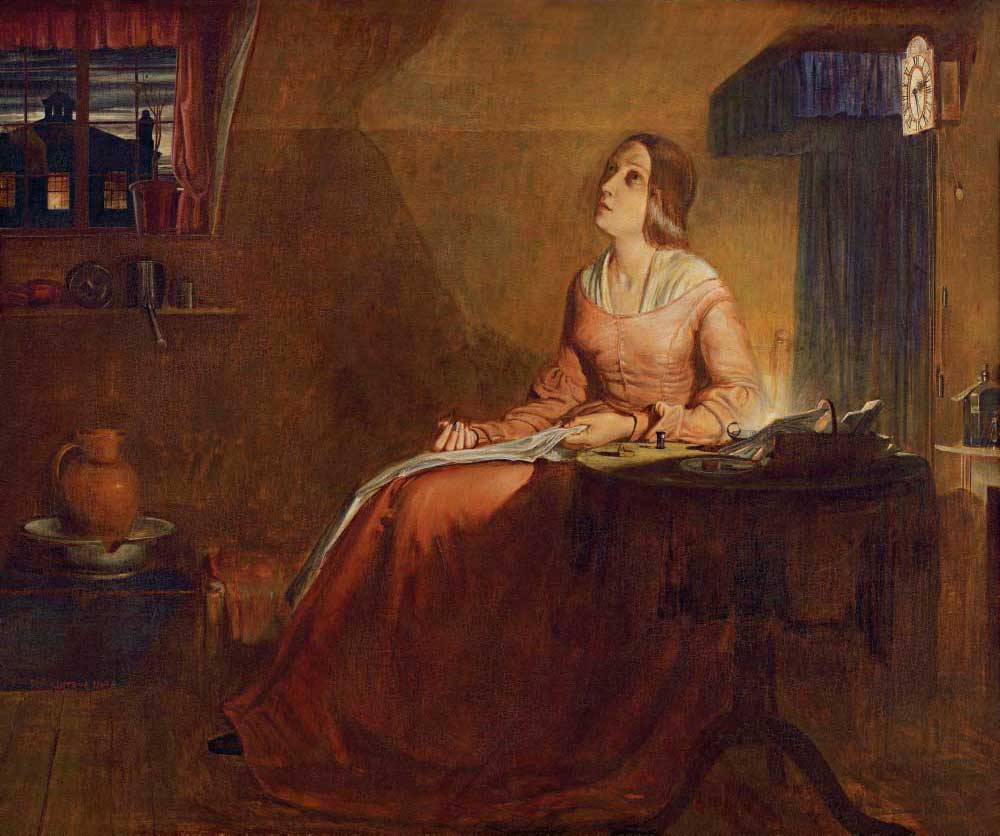
The Sempstress, 1844

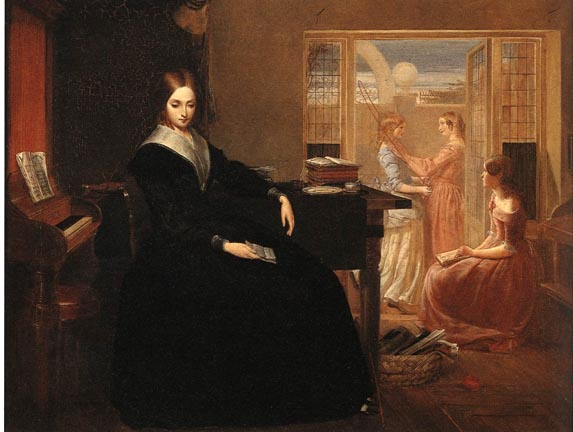
The Governess, 1844

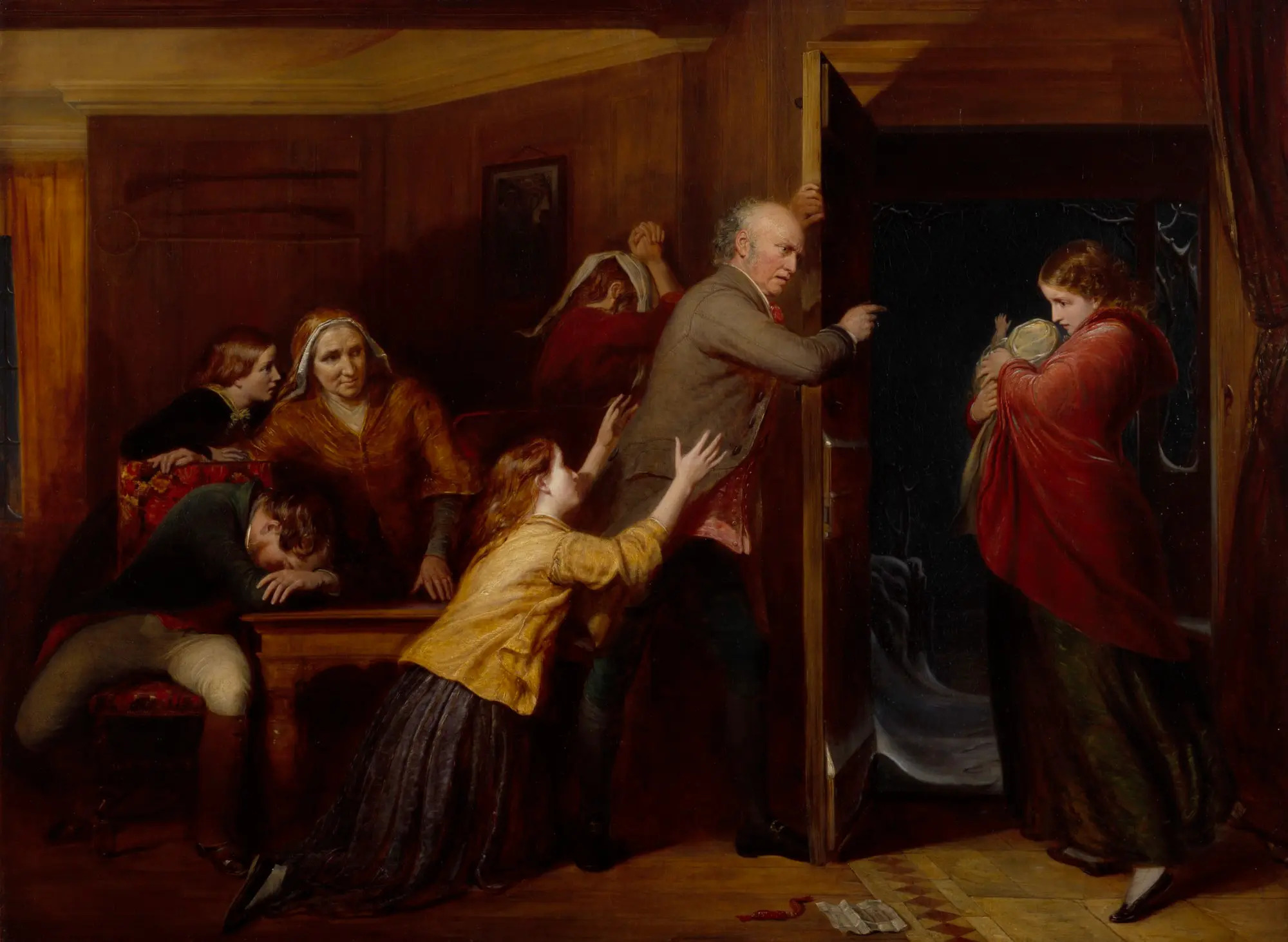
The Outcast, 1851

The Sylvan Spring, 1854

Young Lady Bountiful, 1861

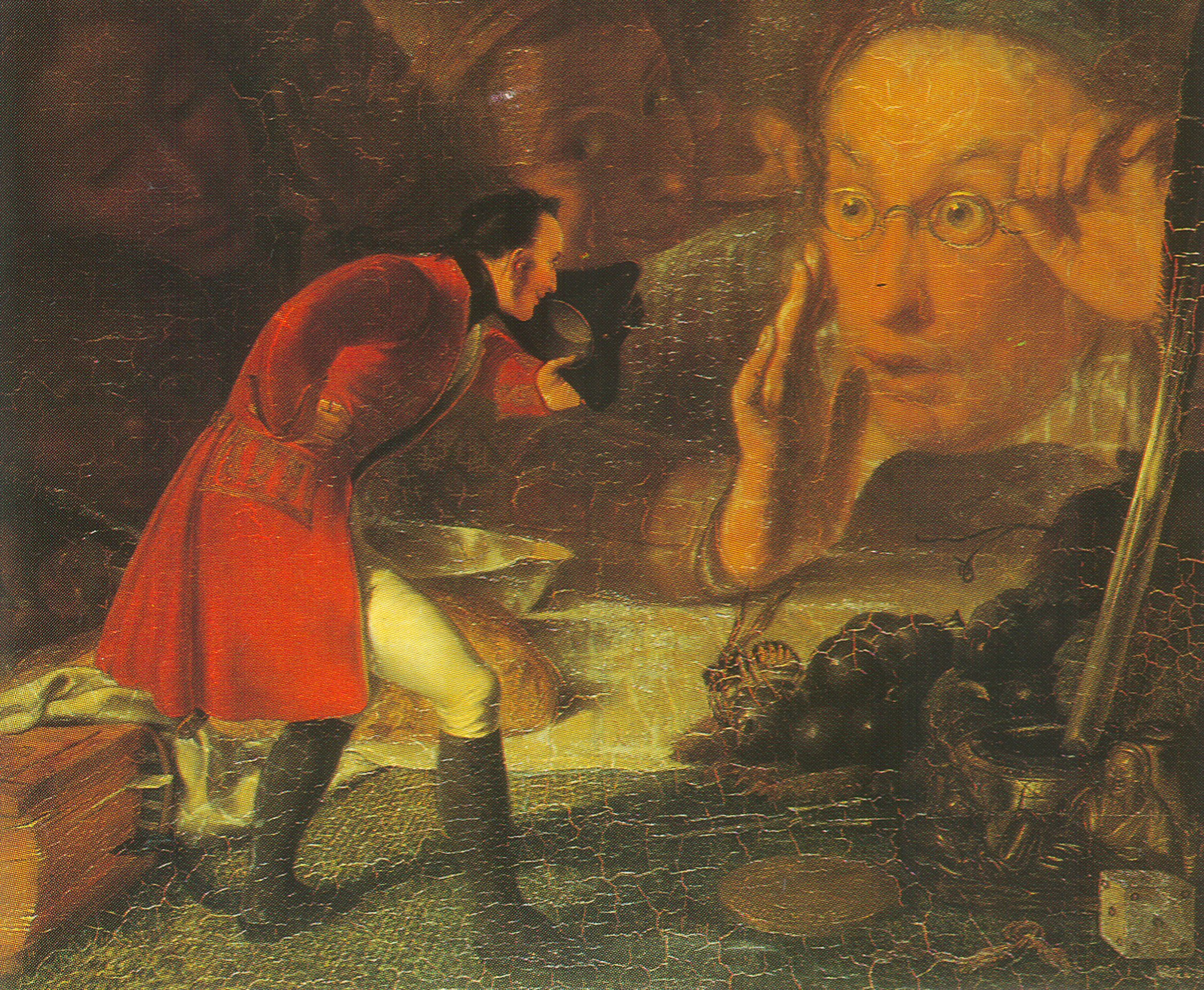
Gulliver in Brobdingnag, Victoria and Albert Museum
