= 1842 in art =

Events from the year 1842 in art.

== Events ==
- 2 May – The Royal Academy Exhibition of 1842 opens in London
- David Roberts begins publication of Sketches in the Holy Land (chromolithographs).
- Richard Dadd becomes mentally ill during a tour of the Middle East and is thought to be suffering from sunstroke.
- Construction work resumes on Cologne Cathedral, after a gap of nearly three centuries.
- George Hayter granted a knighthood.
- William Fox Talbot receives the Rumford Medal of the Royal Society.
- George R. Lewis records the famous carvings at Kilpeck church, Herefordshire.
- Dordrechts Museum established in the Netherlands.
- Grand sale of contents of Strawberry Hill House near London.

== Works ==
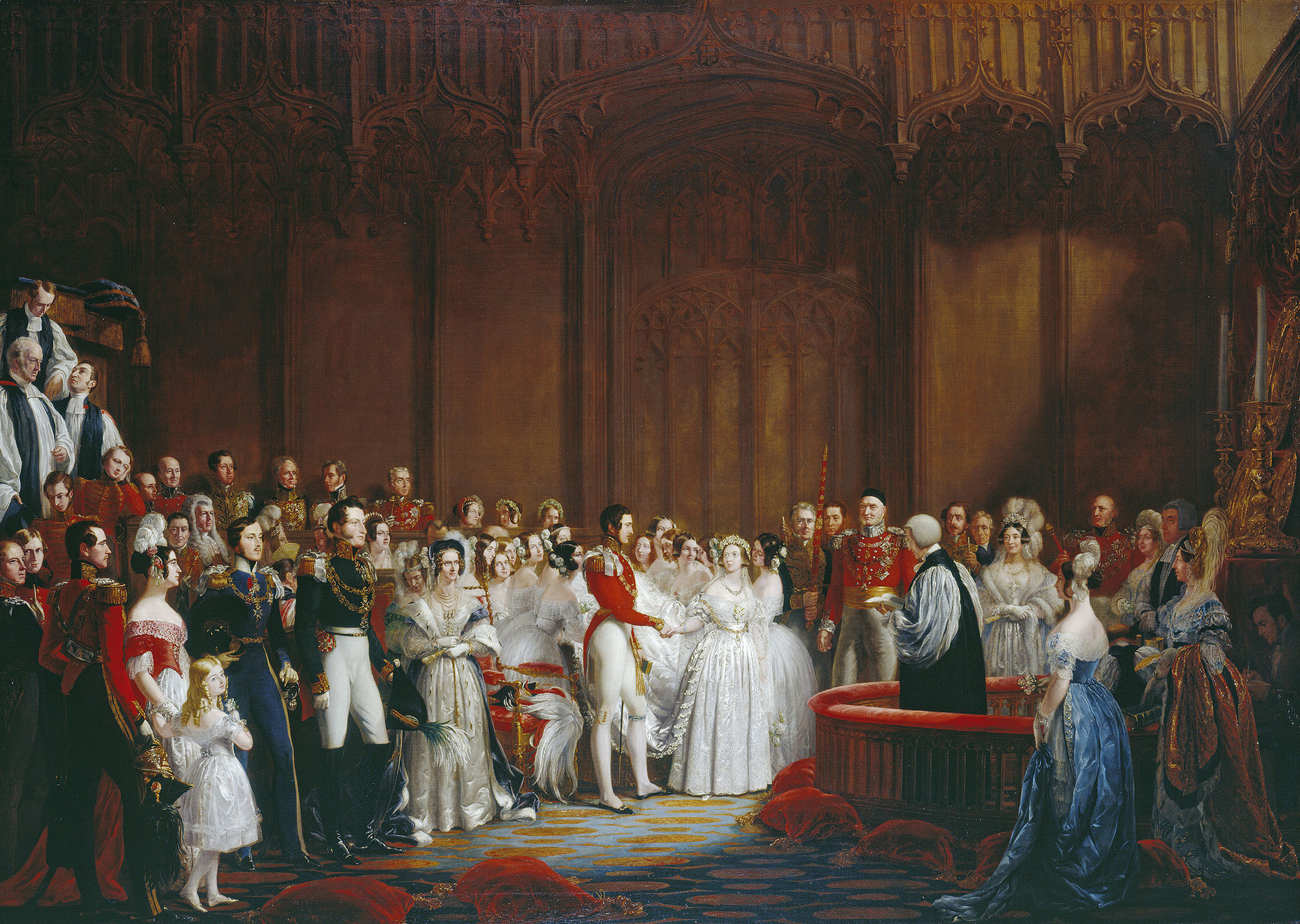
Hayter – The Marriage of Queen Victoria.

- Jean-Adolphe Beaucé – Captain Lelièvre's Heroic Defence at Mazagran
- Thomas Brigstocke – Alnaschar, the Barber's fifth Brother
- Ford Madox Brown – Manfred on the Jungfrau
- Théodore Chassériau – The Descent from the Cross
- Thomas Cole – The Voyage of Life (National Gallery of Art, Washington, D.C.)
- William Collins – View of Sir David Wilkie's House in Kensington
- Gustave Courbet – Self-Portrait with a Black Dog
- Richard Dadd – Come unto these Yellow Sands
- Johan Christian Dahl
  - Frogner Manor
  - View from Stalheim
- Charles Lock Eastlake – Hagar Offering Water to Her Son Ishmael in the Desert
- William Powell Frith
  - Dolly Varden
  - Kate Nickleby at Madame Mantalini's
  - Measuring Heights
- Benjamin Haydon
  - The Black Prince Thanking Lord James Audley for his Gallantry in the Battle of Poitiers
  - Curtius Leaping into the Gulf
  - The Maid of Saragossa
  - Wordsworth on Helvellyn
- Francesco Hayez – Samson and the Lion
- George Hayter – The Marriage of Queen Victoria
- Jean Auguste Dominique Ingres
  - Luigi Cherubini and the Muse of Lyric Poetry
  - Odalisque with Slave
  - Portrait of the Duke of Orléans
- Henry Inman – Portrait of Angelica Singleton Van Buren
- Eugène Isabey – The Town and Port of Dieppe
- Edwin Landseer – There's No Place Like Home
- Charles Robert Leslie – Queen Katherine and Patience
- Daniel Maclise –
  - The Origin of the Harp
  - The Play Scene in Hamlet
  - Waterfall at St Nighton's Kieve
- William Mulready – Crossing the Ford
- Thomas Phillips – Portrait of Michael Faraday
- Richard Redgrave
  - Bad News from Sea
  - Cinderella About to Try on the Glass Slipper
  - Ophelia Weaving Her Garlands
- J. M. W. Turner
  - Campo Santo, Venice
  - Peace – Burial at Sea
  - Snowstorm – steam boat off a harbour's mouth making signals in shallow water, and going by the lead
  - War. The Exile and the Rock Limpet
  - Rigi series of watercolours
- Franz Xaver Winterhalter – Portrait of Prince Albert
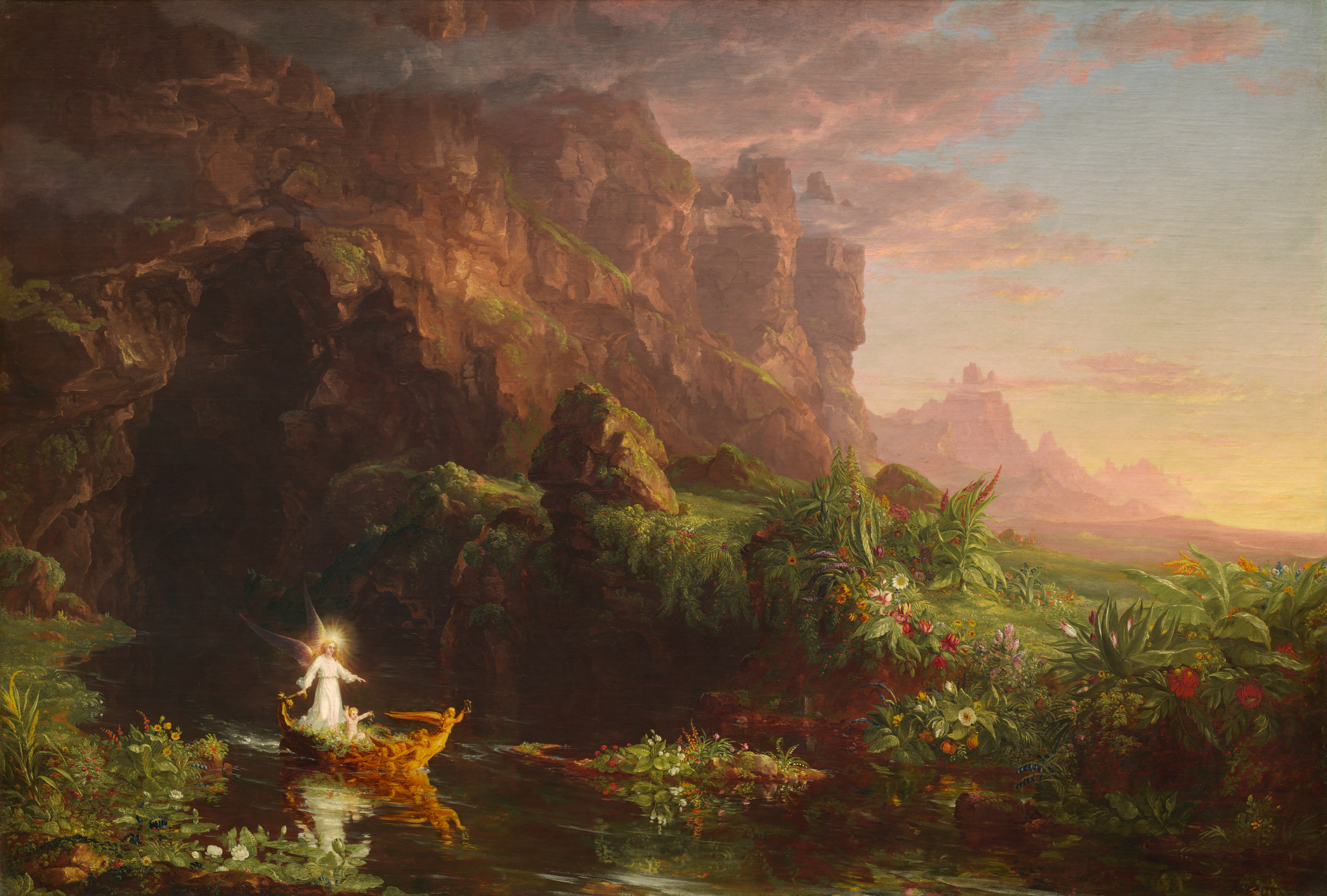
Thomas Cole, The Voyage of Life: Childhood

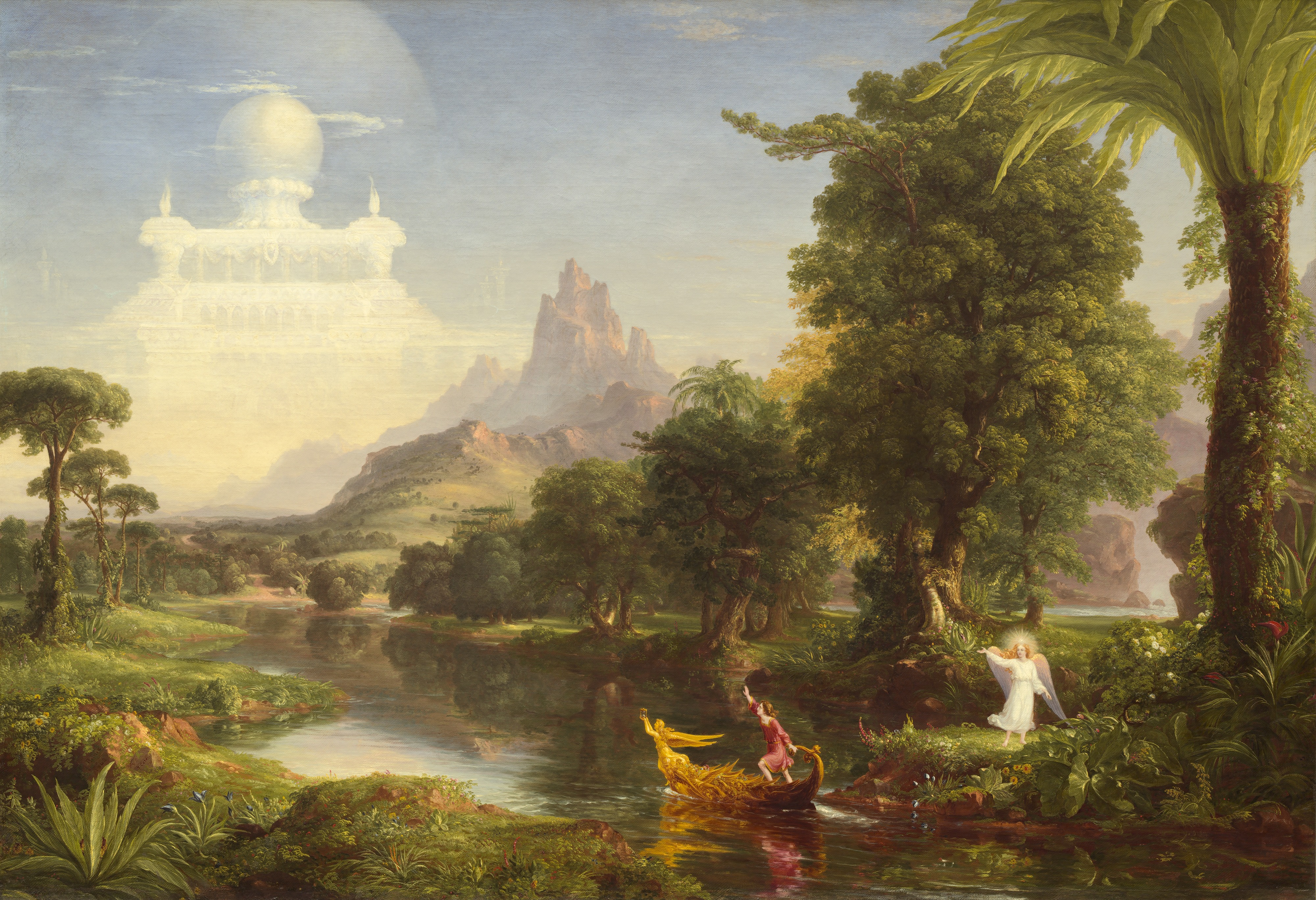
Thomas Cole, The Voyage of Life: Youth

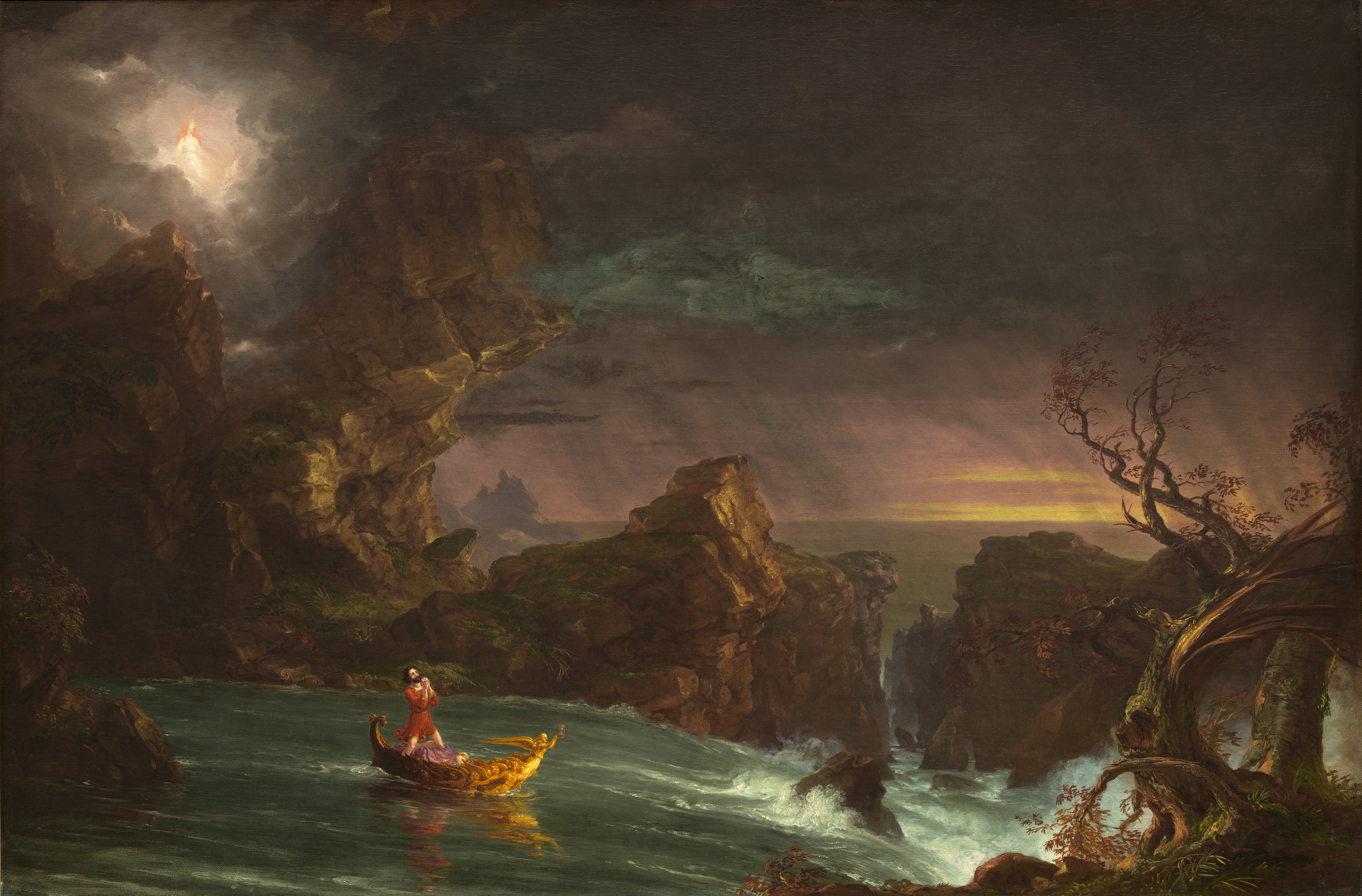
Thomas Cole, The Voyage of Life: Manhood

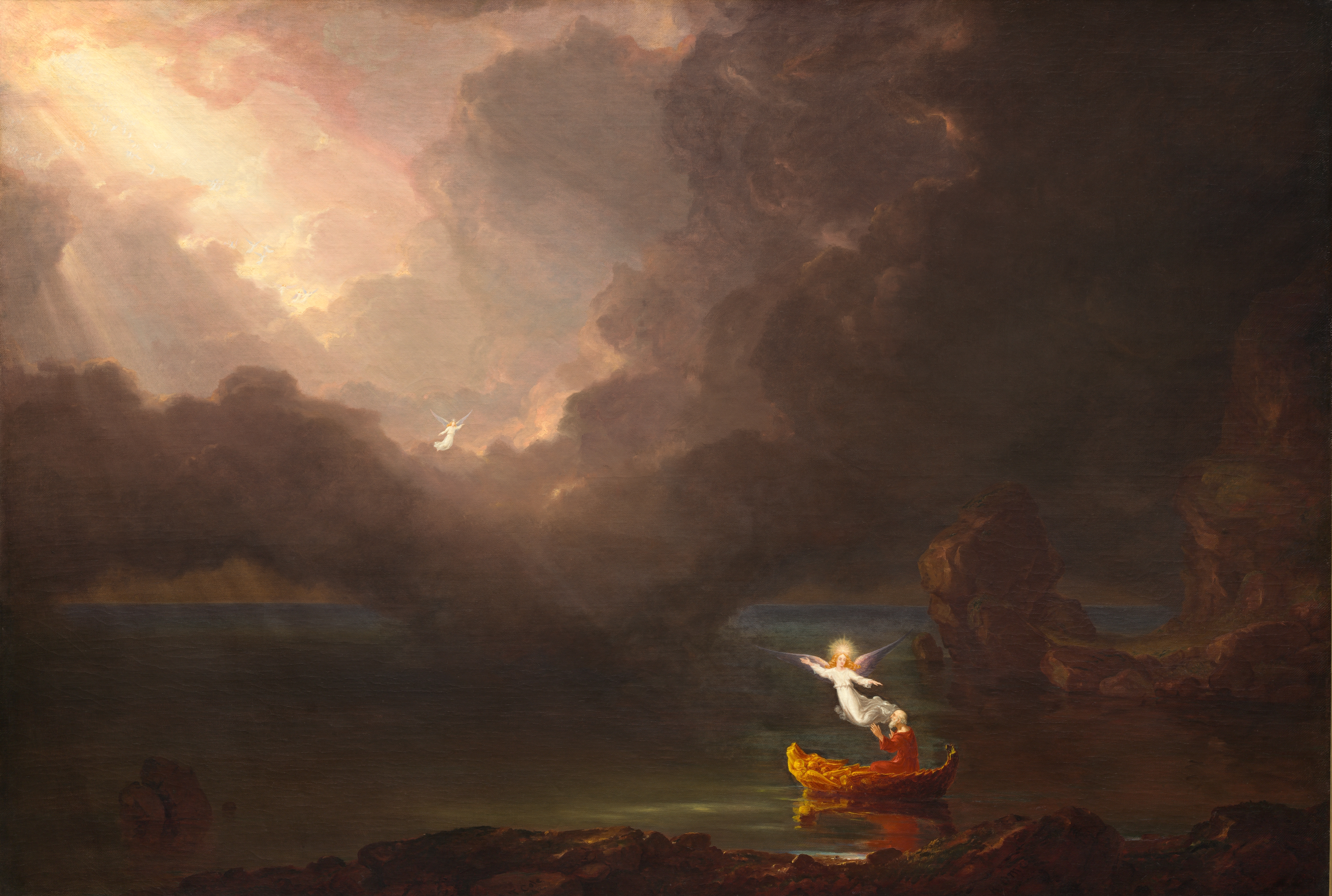
Thomas Cole, The Voyage of Life: Old Age

== Births ==
- June 12 – Harry Hems, English architectural and ecclesiastical sculptor (died 1916)
- October 18 – Sydney Prior Hall, English portraitist and illustrator (died 1922)
- November 29 – William Blake Richmond, English painter and interior decorator (died 1921)
- December 16 – Otto Sinding, Norwegian painter (died 1909)
- December 18 – William Anderson, collector of Japanese art (died 1900)
- December 31 – Giovanni Boldini, Italian painter (died 1931)

== Deaths ==
- March 16 - Archer James Oliver, British portrait painter (born 1774)
- March 30 – Marie Louise Élisabeth Vigée Le Brun, painter (born 1755)
- May 12 – Walenty Wańkowicz, Belarusian-Polish painter (born 1799)
- May 26 – James Stuart, Irish-Australian painter (born 1802)
- July 7 – Louis-André-Gabriel Bouchet, French historical painter (born 1759)
- July 28 – John Sell Cotman, English artist of the Norwich school especially watercolours (born 1782)
- August 28 – Peter Fendi, Austrian portrait and genre painter, engraver, and lithographer (born 1796)
- September 11 – Charles Codman, landscape painter of Portland, Maine (born 1800)
- November 17 – John Varley, English watercolour painter and astrologer (born 1778)
- date unknown
  - Giovanni Balestra, Italian engraver (born 1774)
  - George Barret, Jr., English landscape painter (born 1767)
  - Paolo Caronni, Italian engraver (born 1779)
  - Gilles-François Closson, Belgian landscape painter (born 1796)
