= No Place Like Home =

(There's) No Place Like Home may refer to:

== Books ==
- No Place Like Home, a 2003 novel by Barbara Samuel
- No Place Like Home (novel), a 2005 novel by Mary Higgins Clark

== Film and TV ==
=== Film ===
- "There's no place like home," a quote from the 1939 film The Wizard of Oz
- No Place Like Home (1989 film), a CBS TV movie directed by Lee Grant
- No Place Like Home (2001 film), a film written and directed by Craig Clyde
- No Place Like Home (2006 film), a documentary film directed by Courtney Fathom Sell
- No Place Like Home, a film by Perry Henzell intended as a sequel to The Harder They Come, shot in 1978, released in a rough cut in 2006, fully restored in 2019
- There's No Place Like Home (film), an Italian film

=== Television ===
- No Place Like Home (TV series), an early-mid 1980s BBC sitcom
- No Place Like Home (audio drama), a 2003 Doctor Who audio-drama
- "No Place Like Home" (Buffy the Vampire Slayer), a 2000 episode
- "No Place Like Home" (Doctors), a 2005 episode
- "No Place Like Home" (No Place Like Home episode), 1983
- "No Place Like Home" (Rugrats episode), a 2000 episode
- "No Place Like Home" (Wentworth), a 2013 episode
- "There's No Place Like Home" (Lost), a 2008 episode
- "There's No Place Like Home" (Once Upon a Time), a 2014 episode

== Music ==
- No Place Like Home (Big Country album), 1991
- No Place Like Home (Doug Stanhope album), 2016
- No Place Like Home (Vacations album), 2024

=== Songs ===
- "(There's No Place Like) Home for the Holidays", a Christmas song first recorded in 1954 by Perry Como
- "No Place Like Home" (Cynthia Erivo song), 2025
- "No Place Like Home" (Primal Rock Rebellion song), 2012
- "No Place Like Home" (Squeeze song), 1985
- "No Place Like Home" (Randy Travis song), 1986
- "No Place Like Home", by 4 Non Blondes from Bigger, Better, Faster, More!, 1992
- "No Place Like Home", by Devo from Something for Everybody, 2010
- "No Place Like Home", by Subterranean Masquerade from Suspended Animation Dreams, 2005
- "No Place Like Home", by Marianas Trencha from Ever After, 2011
- "No Place Like Home", by Ross Lynch & Laura Marano from Austin & Ally: Take It from the Top, 2015
- "No Place Like Home", by Todrick Hall from Straight Outta Oz, 2016
- "No Place Like Home", by Major Lazer, Nelly Furtado, and Davido from Official FIFA World Cup 2026 Album, 2026
- "There's no place like home," last line of the 1822 song "Home! Sweet Home!"

== Other ==
- There's No Place Like Home (painting), an 1842 painting by British artist Edwin Landseer
