= The Course of Empire (paintings) =

Series of paintings by Thomas Cole

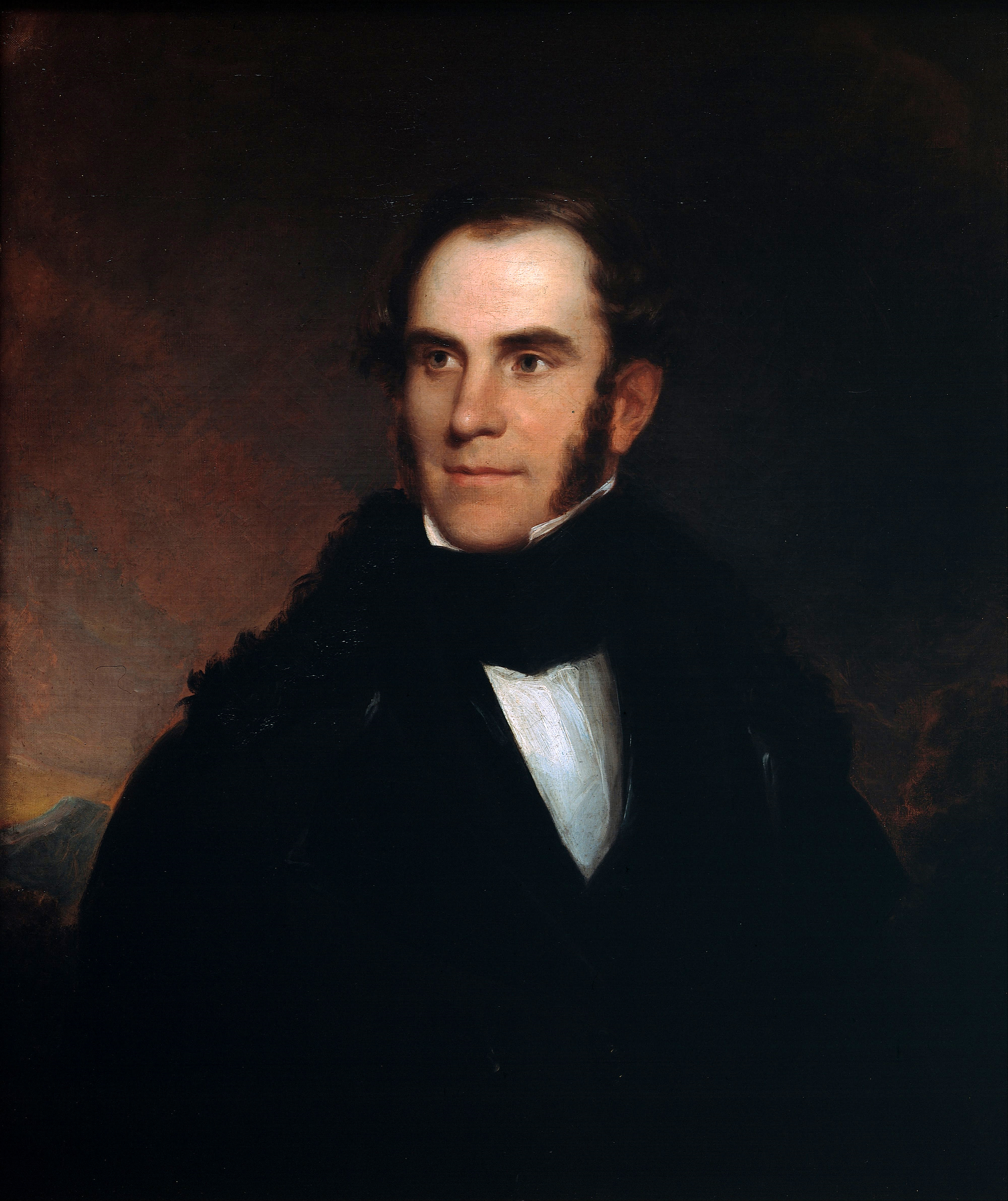
Portrait of Thomas Cole by Asher B. Durand, 1837

The Course of Empire is a series of five paintings created by the English-born American painter Thomas Cole between 1833 and 1836, and now in the collection of the New York Historical. The series depicts the growth and fall of an imaginary city, situated on the lower end of a river valley, near its meeting with a bay of the sea. The valley is identifiable in each of the paintings, in part because of a distinct landmark: a large boulder situated atop a crag overlooking the valley. Some critics believe this is meant to contrast the immutability of the earth with the transience of man.

It is notable in part for reflecting popular American sentiments of the times, when many saw pastoralism as the ideal phase of human civilization, fearing that empire would lead to gluttony and inevitable decay. The theme of cycles is one that Cole returned to frequently, such as in his The Voyage of Life series. The Course of Empire comprises the following works: The Course of Empire – The Savage State; The Arcadian or Pastoral State; The Consummation of Empire; Destruction; and Desolation.

All the paintings are oil on canvas, and all are 39.5 inches by 63.5 inches (100 cm by 161 cm) except The Consummation of Empire which is 51″ by 76″ (130 cm by 193 cm).

== Overview ==
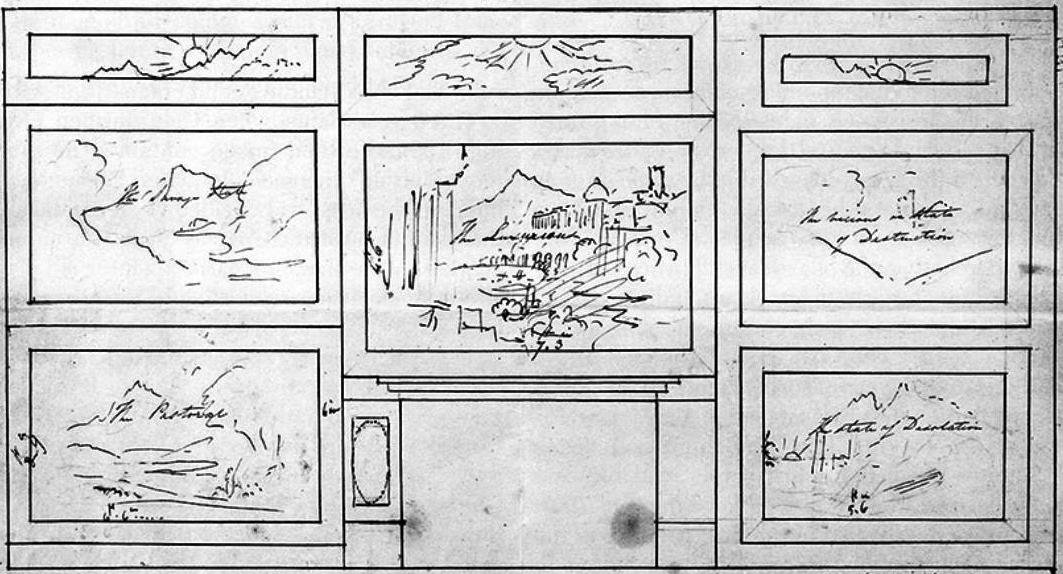
Cole's 1833 sketch for the arrangement of the paintings around Reed's fireplace: the sketch also shows above the paintings three aspects of the sun: left (rising); center (zenith); right (setting)

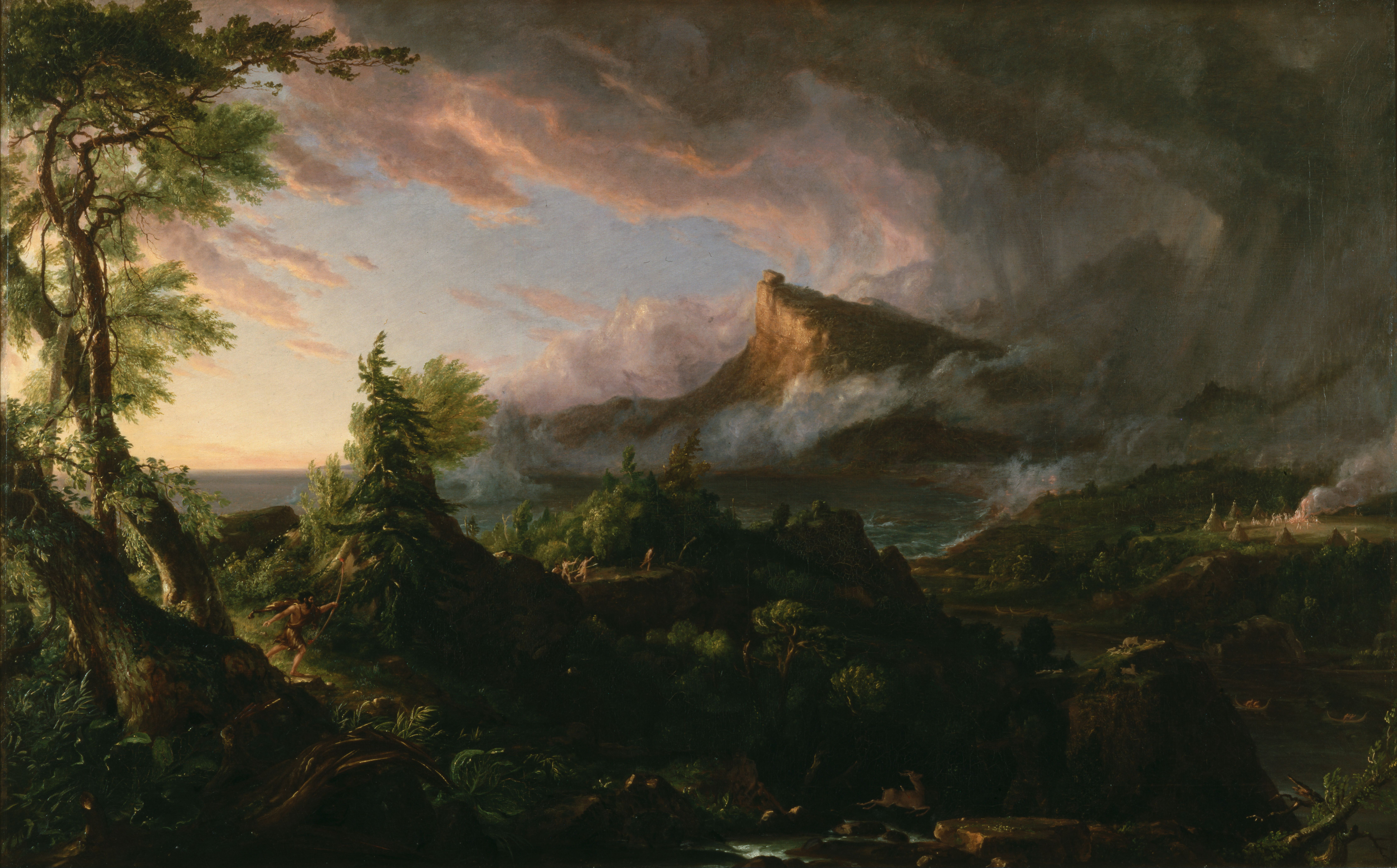
The Savage State

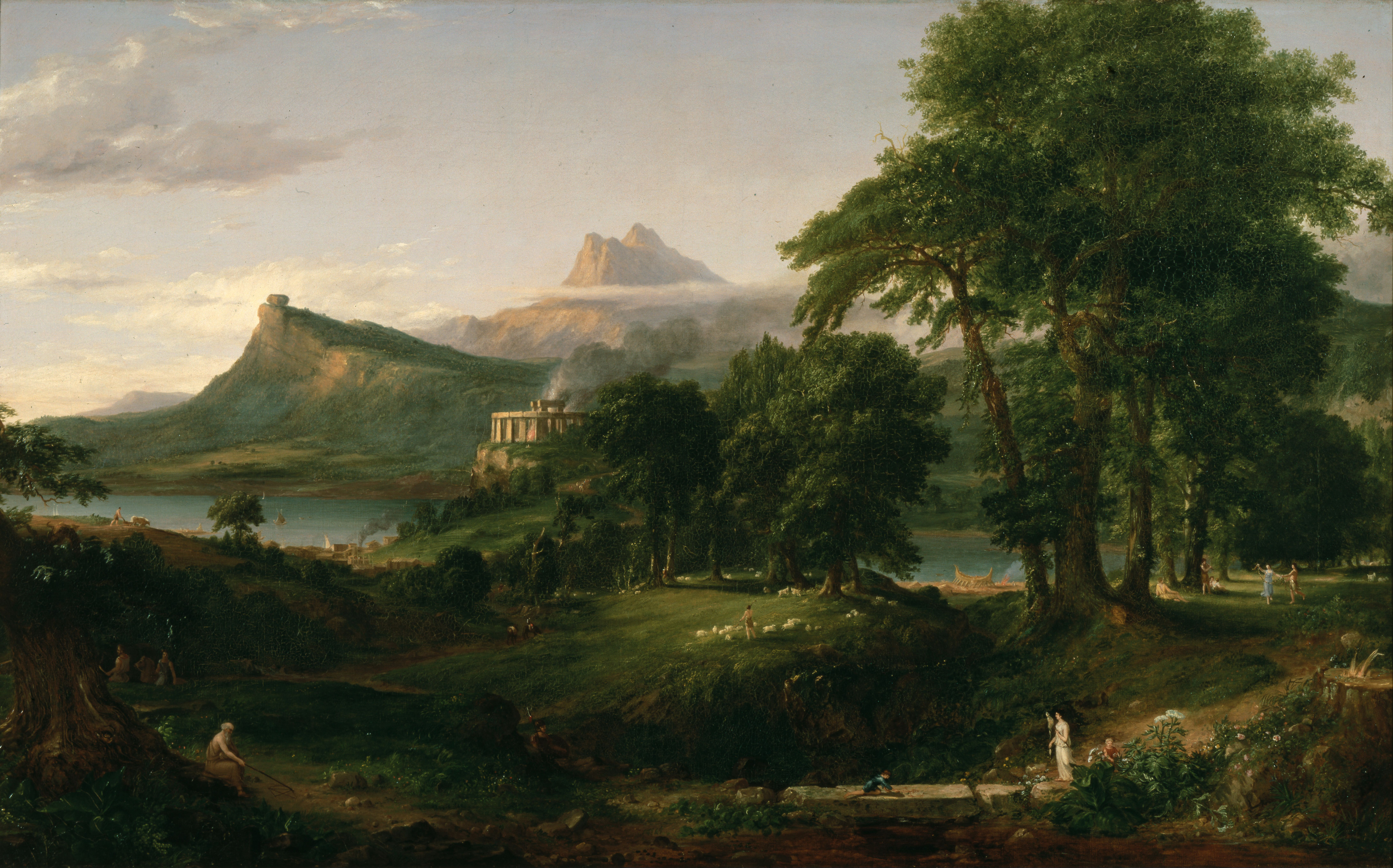
The Arcadian or Pastoral State

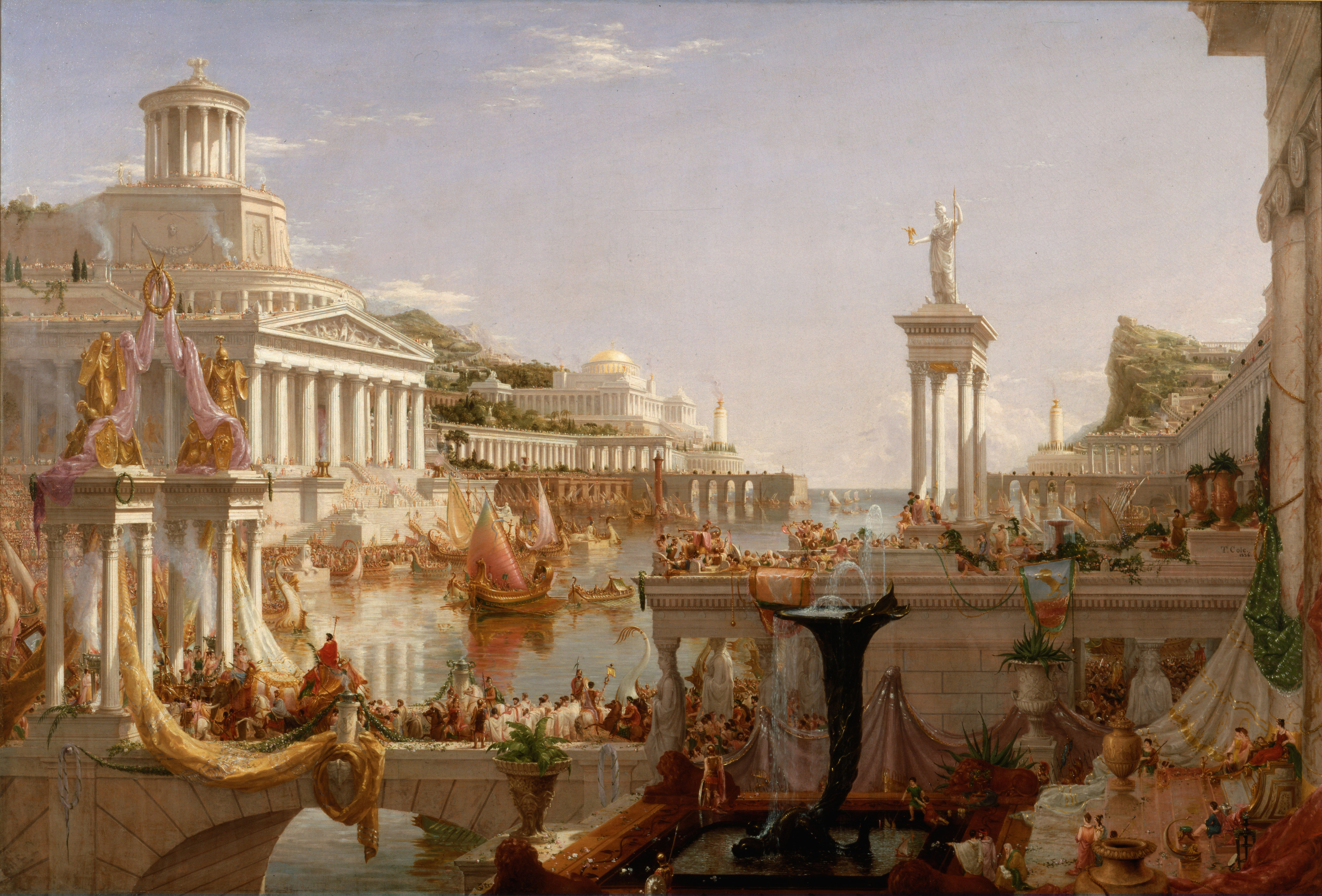
The Consummation

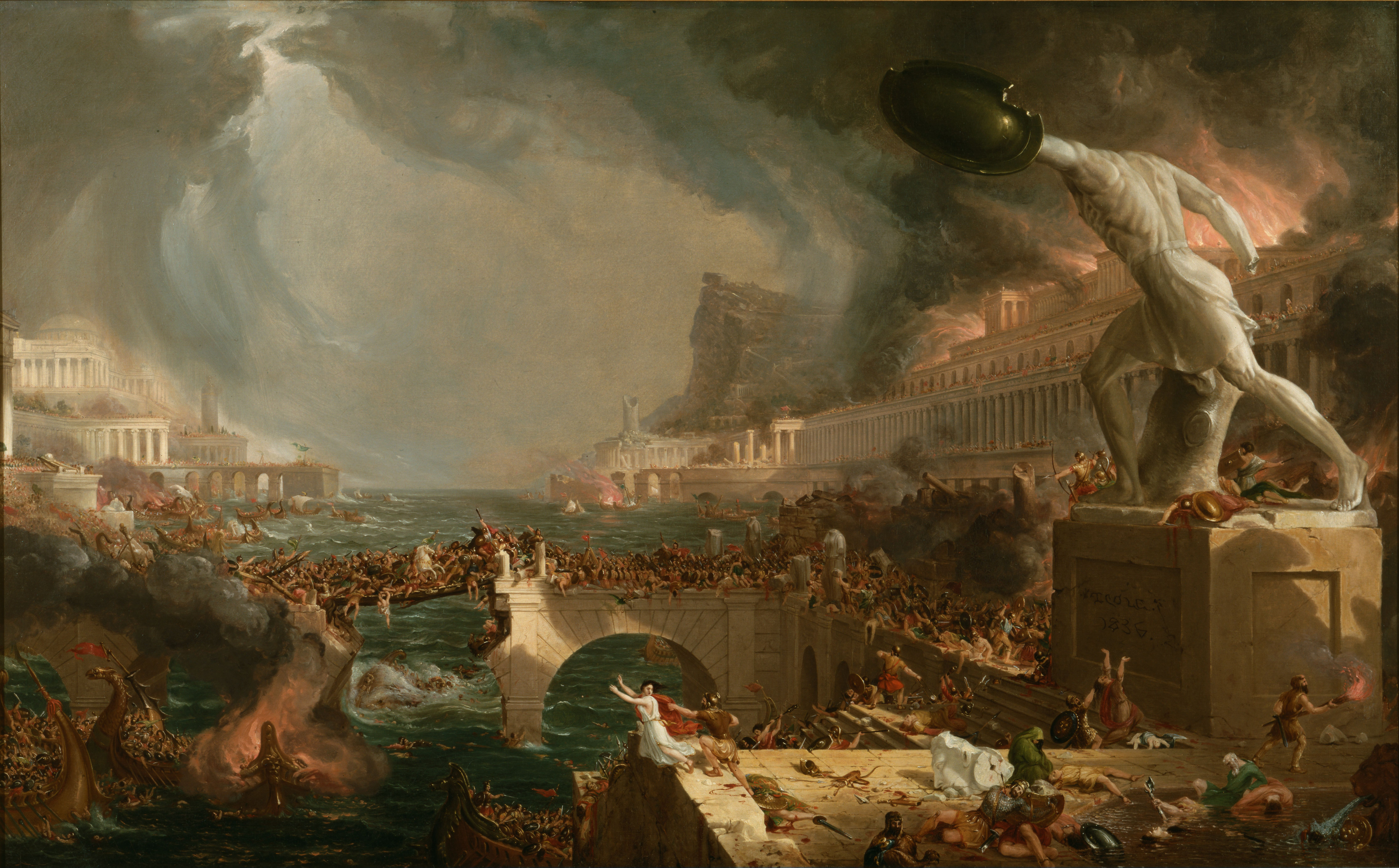
Destruction

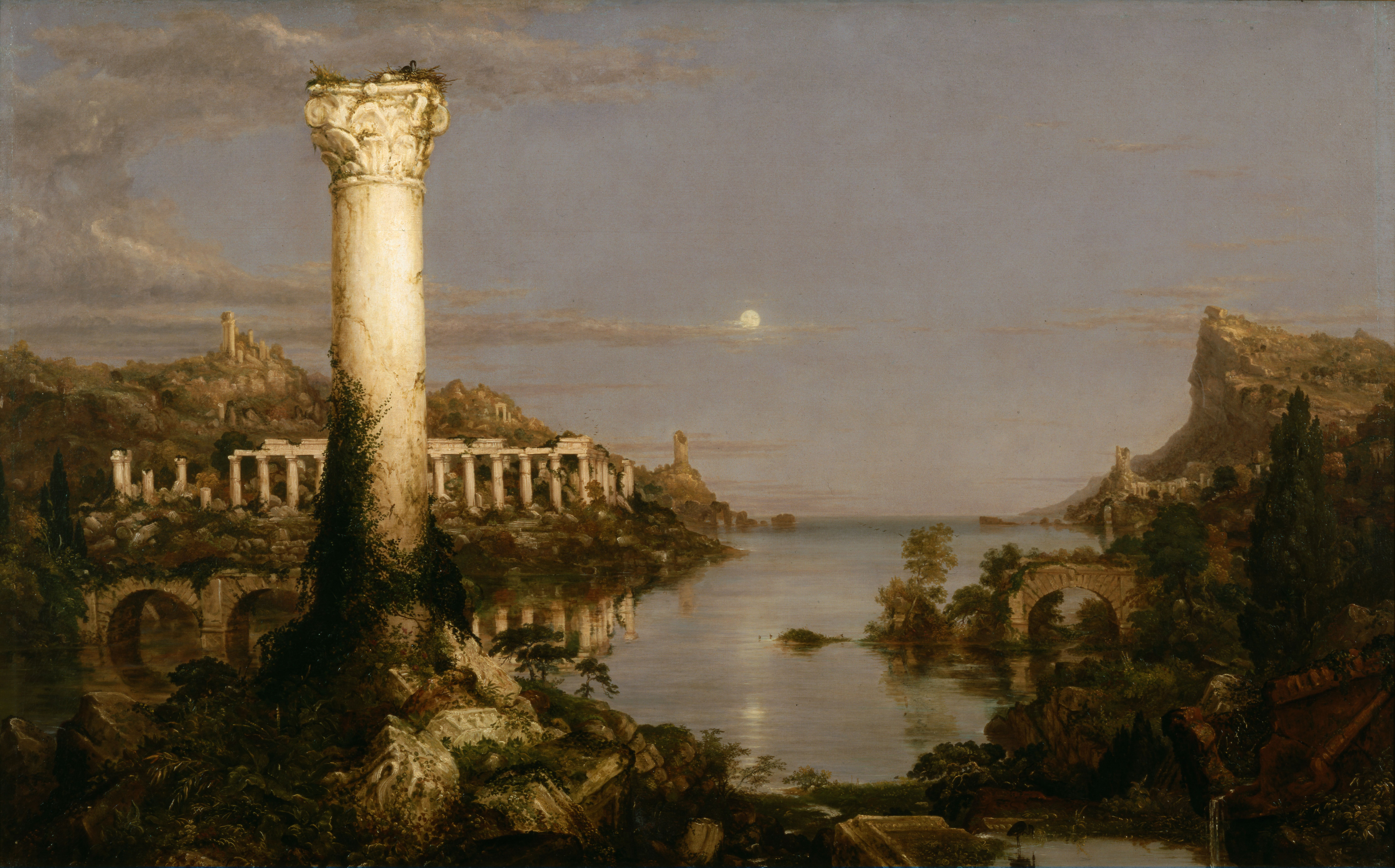
Desolation

Though not based on any specific city, the architecture, sculpture and costumes are clearly in the styles of Greco-Roman classical civilization, and the historical arc traced in the series can be loosely compared to the History of Rome. Revived styles of classical architecture had become the standard for most major public buildings in the United States, especially Washington DC, enabling the series to be read as a forecast or warning for American civilization.

A direct source of literary inspiration for The Course of Empire paintings is Lord Byron's Childe Harold's Pilgrimage (1812–18). Cole quoted lines from Canto IV in his newspaper advertisements for the series:

First freedom and then Glory – when that fails,
Wealth, vice, corruption …

A quote by Bishop Berkeley also can be used to describe the series:

Bishop Berkeley -"Westward, the course of empire takes its way …"

Cole designed these paintings to be displayed prominently in the picture gallery on the third floor of the mansion of his patron, Luman Reed, at 13 Greenwich Street, New York City. The layout was approximately as shown here, according to Cole's installation diagram (adopted to the fireplace). The series was acquired by The New-York Historical Society in 1858 as a gift of the New-York Gallery of Fine Arts and remains in their collection today.

== The Course of Empire ==
=== The Savage State, or The Commencement of Empire ===
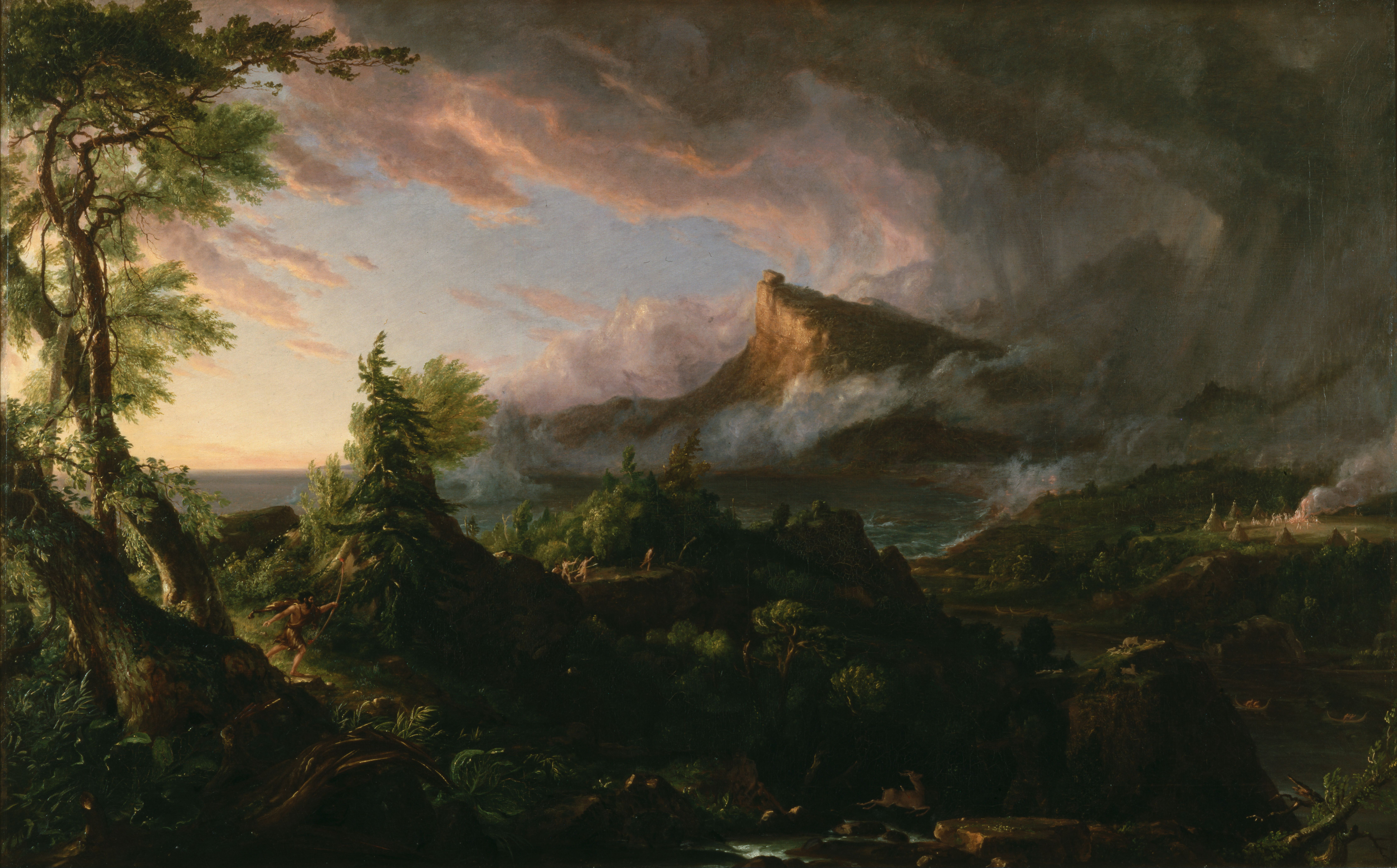
The Savage State. Oil on canvas, 1834, 39 ½ × 63 ½ in.

The first painting, The Savage State, shows the valley from the shore opposite the crag, in the dim light of a dawning stormy day. Clouds and mist shroud much of the distant landscape, hinting at the uncertain future. A hunter clad in skins hastens through the wilderness, pursuing a fleeing deer; canoes paddle up the river; on the far shore can be seen a clearing with a cluster of tipis around a fire, the nucleus of the city that is to be. The visual references are those of Native American life. This painting depicts the ideal state of the natural world. It is a healthy world, unchanged by humanity.

==== Description by Thomas Cole ====
No. 1., which may be called the 'Savage State,' or 'the Commencement of Empire,' represents a wild scene of rocks, mountains, woods, and a bay of the ocean. The sun is rising from the sea, and the stormy clouds of night are dissipating before his rays. On the farthest side of the bay rises a precipitous hill, crowned by a singular isolated rock, which, to the mariner, would ever be a striking land-mark. As the same locality is represented in each picture of the series, this rock identifies it, although the observer's situation varies in the several pictures. The chase being the most characteristic occupation of savage life, in the fore-ground we see a man attired in skins, in pursuit of a deer, which, stricken by his arrow, is bounding down a water-course. On the rocks in the middle ground are to be seen savages, with dogs, in pursuit of deer. On the water below may be seen several canoes, and on the promontory beyond, are several huts, and a number of figures dancing round a fire. In this picture, we have the first rudiments of society. Men are banded together for mutual aid in the chase, etc. The useful arts have commenced in the construction of canoes, huts, and weapons. Two of the fine arts, music and poetry, have their germs, as we may suppose, in the singing which usually accompanies the dance of savages. The empire is asserted, although to a limited degree, over sea, land, and the animal kingdom. The season represented is Spring.

=== The Arcadian or Pastoral State ===
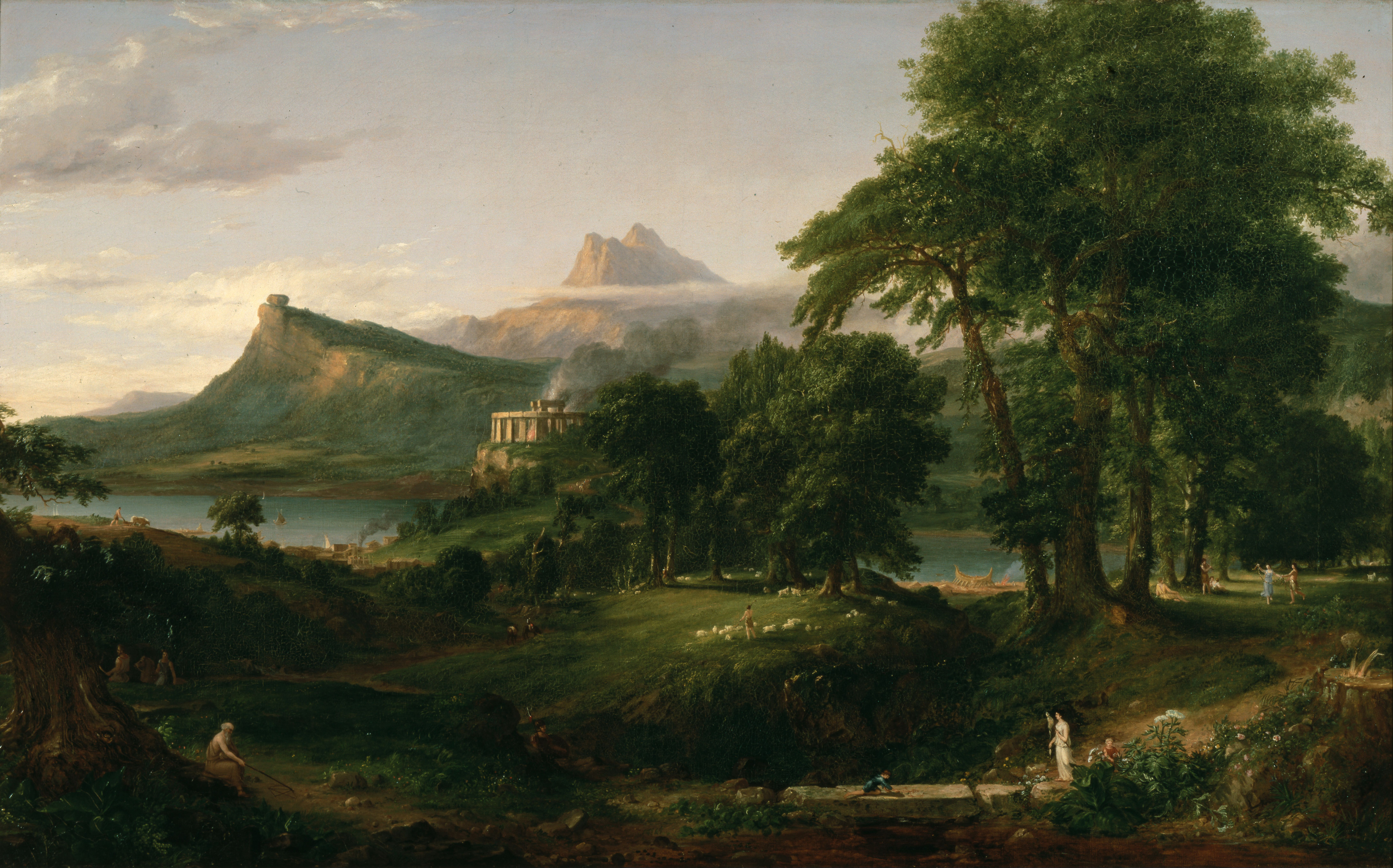
The Arcadian or Pastoral State. Oil on canvas, 1834, 39 ½ × 63 ½ in.

In the second painting, The Arcadian or Pastoral State, the sky has cleared and it is the fresh morning of a day in spring or summer. The viewpoint has shifted further up the river, as the crag with the boulder is now on the left-hand side of the painting; a forked peak can be seen in the distance beyond it. Much of the wilderness has given way to cultivated land and agriculture, with plowed fields and lawns visible. Various activities go on in the background: plowing, boat building, herding sheep, dancing; in the foreground, an old man sketches what may be a geometrical problem with a stick. On a bluff on the near side of the river, a megalithic temple has been built, and smoke (presumably from sacrifices) arises from it. Below the temple, an emerging village is taking shape along the riverbed. The images reflect an idealized, pre-urban Archaic Greece. This work shows humanity at peace with the land. The environment has been altered, but not so much so that it or its inhabitants are in danger. Yet the construction of the warship and the concerned mother watching as her child sketches a soldier, herald the emerging imperial ambitions. Furthermore, a tree stump is seen in the right foreground, a reflection of the dark nature of man already developed, and a foreshadow to the fate of the growing settlement.

==== Description by Thomas Cole ====
No. 2. – The Simple or Arcadian State, represents the scene after ages have passed. The gradual advancement of society has wrought a change in its aspect. The 'untracked and rude' has been tamed and softened. Shepherds are tending their flocks; the ploughman, with his oxen, is upturning the soil, and Commerce begins to stretch her wings. A village is growing by the shore, and on the summit of a hill a rude temple has been erected, from which the smoke of sacrifice is now ascending. In the fore-ground, on the left, is seated an old man, who, by describing lines in the sand, seems to have made some geometrical discovery. On the right of the picture, is a female with a distaff, about to cross a rude stone bridge. On the stone is a boy, who appears, to be making a drawing of a man with a sword, and ascending the road, a soldier is partly seen. Under the trees, beyond the female figure, may be seen a group of peasants; some are dancing, while one plays on a pipe. In this picture, we have agriculture, commerce, and religion. In the old man who describes the mathematical figure – in the rude attempt of the boy in drawing – in the female figure with the distaff—in the vessel on the stocks, and in the primitive temple on the hill, it is evident that the useful arts, the fine arts, and the sciences, have made considerable progress. The scene is supposed to be viewed a few hours after sunrise, and in the early Summer.

=== The Consummation of Empire ===
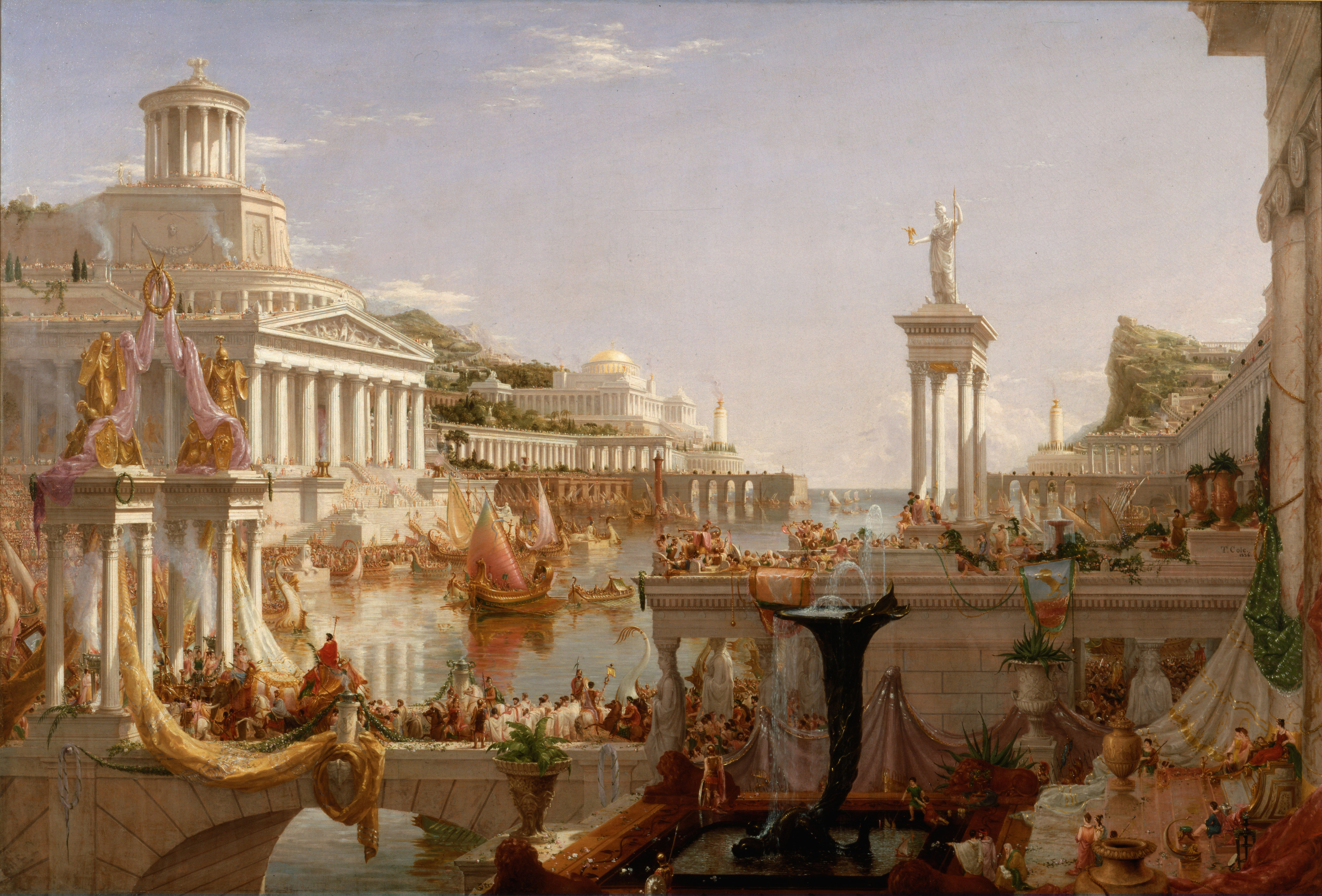
The Consummation of Empire. Oil on canvas, 1836, 51 × 76 in.

The third painting, The Consummation of Empire, shifts the viewpoint to the opposite shore, approximately the site of the clearing in the first painting. Both sides of the river valley are now covered in colonnaded marble structures, whose steps run down into the water. The megalithic temple seems to have been transformed into a huge domed structure dominating the river-bank. The mouth of the river is guarded by two pharoi, and ships with lateen sails go out to the sea beyond. A joyous crowd gathers on the balconies and terraces as a scarlet-robed king or victorious general crosses a bridge connecting the two sides of the river in a triumphant procession. Guarding him are soldiers of various skin tones, a suggestion to the expanse this empire has seen. In the foreground, lower right, there is what seems to be a royal court. Amongst them, under the elaborate fountain, are two boys clad in red and green, with one sinking a toy boat, while another seemingly pleading with him. The adults nearby are inattentive of the discordant behavior, busy in their affairs. Further to the right, amongst the individuals fixed on the procession, a queenly woman sits atop a gilded throne. The look of the painting suggests the height of Ancient Rome. The decadence seen in every detail of this cityscape foreshadows the inevitable fall of this mighty civilization.

==== Description by Thomas Cole ====
In the picture No. 3, we suppose other ages have passed, and the rude village has become a magnificent city. The part seen occupies both sides of the bay, which the observer has now crossed. It has been converted into a capacious harbor, at whose entrance, toward the sea, stand two phari. From the water on each hand, piles of architecture ascend – temples, colonnades and domes. It is a day of rejoicing. A triumphal procession moves over the bridge near the fore-ground. The conqueror, robed in purple, is mounted in a car drawn by an elephant, and surrounded by captives on foot, and a numerous train of guards, senators, etc. – pictures and golden treasures are carried before him. He is about to pass beneath the triumphal arch, while girls strew flowers around. Gay festoons of drapery hang from the clustered columns. Golden trophies glitter above in the sun, and incense rises from silver censers. The harbor is alive with numerous vessels – war galleys, and barks with silken sails. Before the doric temple on the left, the smoke of incense and of the altar rise, and a multitude of white-robed priests stand around on the marble steps. The statue of Minerva, with a victory in her hand, stands above the building of the Caryatides, on a columned pedestal, near which is a band with trumpets, cymbals, etc. On the right, near a bronze fountain and in the shadow of lofty buildings, is an imperial personage viewing the procession, surrounded by her children, attendants, and guard. In this scene is depicted the summit of human glory. The architecture, the ornamental embellishments, etc., show that wealth, power, knowledge, and taste have worked together, and accomplished the highest meed of human achievement and empire. As the triumphal fete would indicate, man has conquered man – nations have been subjugated. This scene is represented as near mid-day, in the early Autumn.

=== Destruction ===
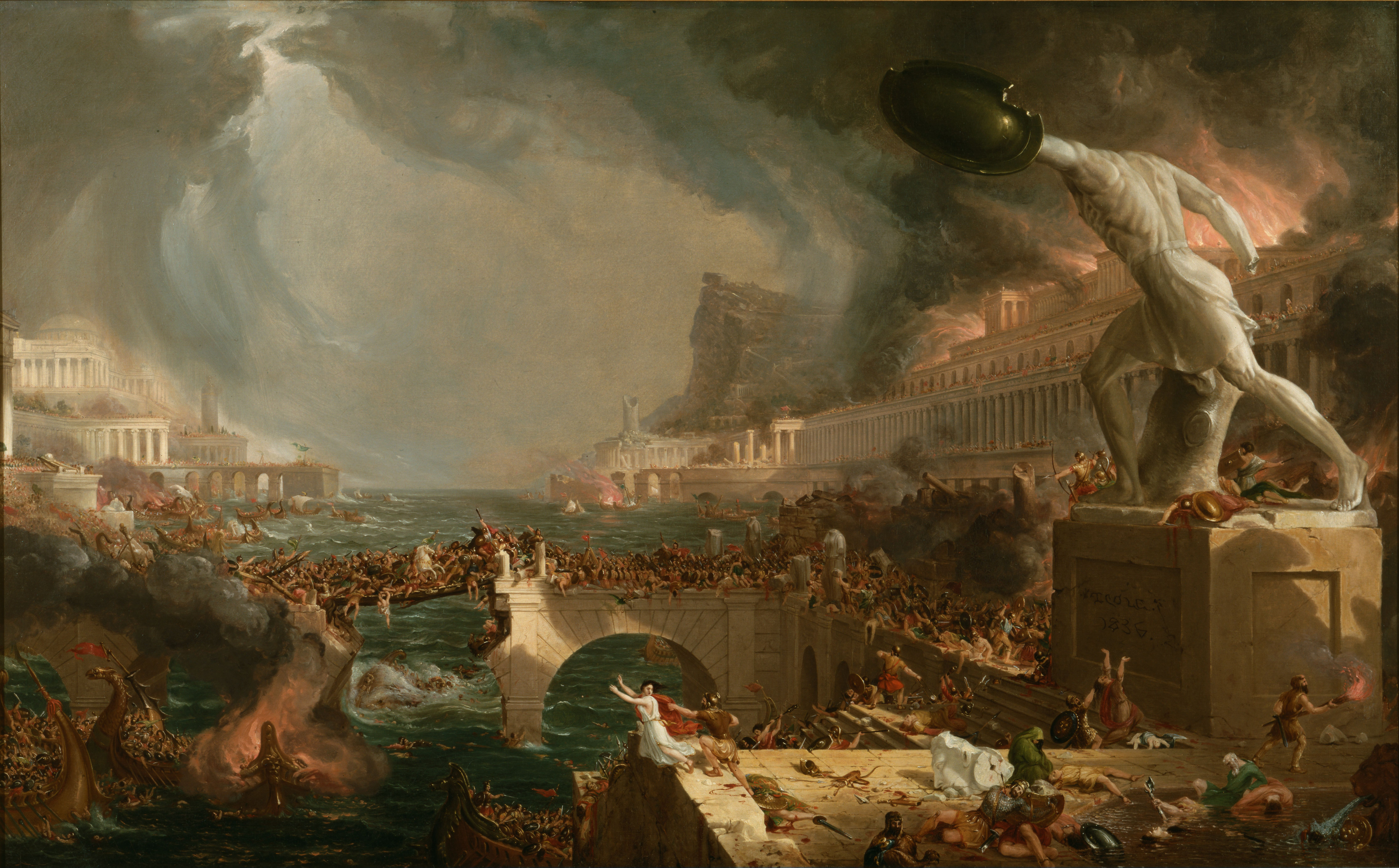
Destruction. Oil on canvas, 1836, 1,000 mm × 1,610 mm (39.5 in × 63.5 in).

The fourth painting, Destruction, has almost the same perspective as the third, though the artist has stepped back a bit to allow a wider scene of the action, and moved almost to the center of the river. The action is the sack and destruction of the city, in the course of a tempest seen in the distance. It seems that a fleet of enemy warriors has overthrown the city's defenses, sailed up the river, and is busy ransacking the city, killing its inhabitants, and seizing women: presumably to rape them. The bridge across which the triumphant procession had crossed is broken; a makeshift crossing strains under the weight of soldiers and refugees. Columns are broken, and fire breaks from the upper floors of a palace on the river bank.

In the foreground a statue of some venerable hero (posed like the Borghese Gladiator) stands headless, still striding forward into the uncertain future. (Note: The artist's name and date 1836 can just be seen on the base of the statue) In the waning light of late afternoon, the dead lie where they fell, in fountains and atop the monuments built to celebrate the affluence of the now fallen civilization. The scene is perhaps suggested by the Vandal sack of Rome in 455.

On the other hand, internal strife and civil war seem also implicated. A catapult positioned on the left bank faces the structural damage on the right bank, exemplified by the contrasting states of the pharoi and suggestive of a prolonged split in the city. The most interesting, however, seem the two men in the fountain at the bottom right: the one in green is resting wearily atop the other, seemingly in contemplation of the heavy price paid, as the other in red lies dead in the water. Allusive of the two boys near the fountain in the previous painting of the series, similarly clad in red and green, the discord may have foreshadowed a civil war. We can see the same colors in the red and green banners on different sides of the river; the green banners mostly on the temple side and the red banners predominantly on the palace side. This may also show the still ongoing war between traditionalism and modernism.

==== Description by Thomas Cole ====
No. 4.– The picture represents the Vicious State, or State of Destruction. Ages may have passed since the scene of glory – though the decline of nations is generally more rapid than their rise. Luxury has weakened and debased. A savage enemy has entered the city. A fierce tempest is raging. Walls and colonnades have been thrown down. Temples and palaces are burning. An arch of the bridge, over which the triumphal procession was passing in the former scene, has been battered down, and the broken pillars, and ruins of war engines, and the temporary bridge that has been thrown over, indicate that this has been the scene of fierce contention. Now there is a mingled multitude battling on the narrow bridge, whose insecurity makes the conflict doubly fearful. Horses and men are precipitated into the foaming waters beneath; war galleys are contending: one vessel is in flames, and another is sinking beneath the prow of a superior foe. In the more distant part of the harbor, the contending vessels are dashed by the furious waves, and some are burning. Along the battlements, among the ruined Caryatides, the contention is fierce; and the combatants fight amid the smoke and flame of prostrate edifices. In the fore-ground are several dead and dying; some bodies have fallen in the basin of a fountain, tinging the waters with their blood. A female is seen sitting in mute despair over the dead body of her son, and a young woman is escaping from the ruffian grasp of a soldier, by leaping over the battlement; another soldier drags a woman by the hair down the steps that form part of the pedestal of a mutilated colossal statue, whose shattered head lies on the pavement below. A barbarous and destroying enemy conquers and sacks the city. Description of this picture is perhaps needless; carnage and destruction are its elements.

=== Desolation ===
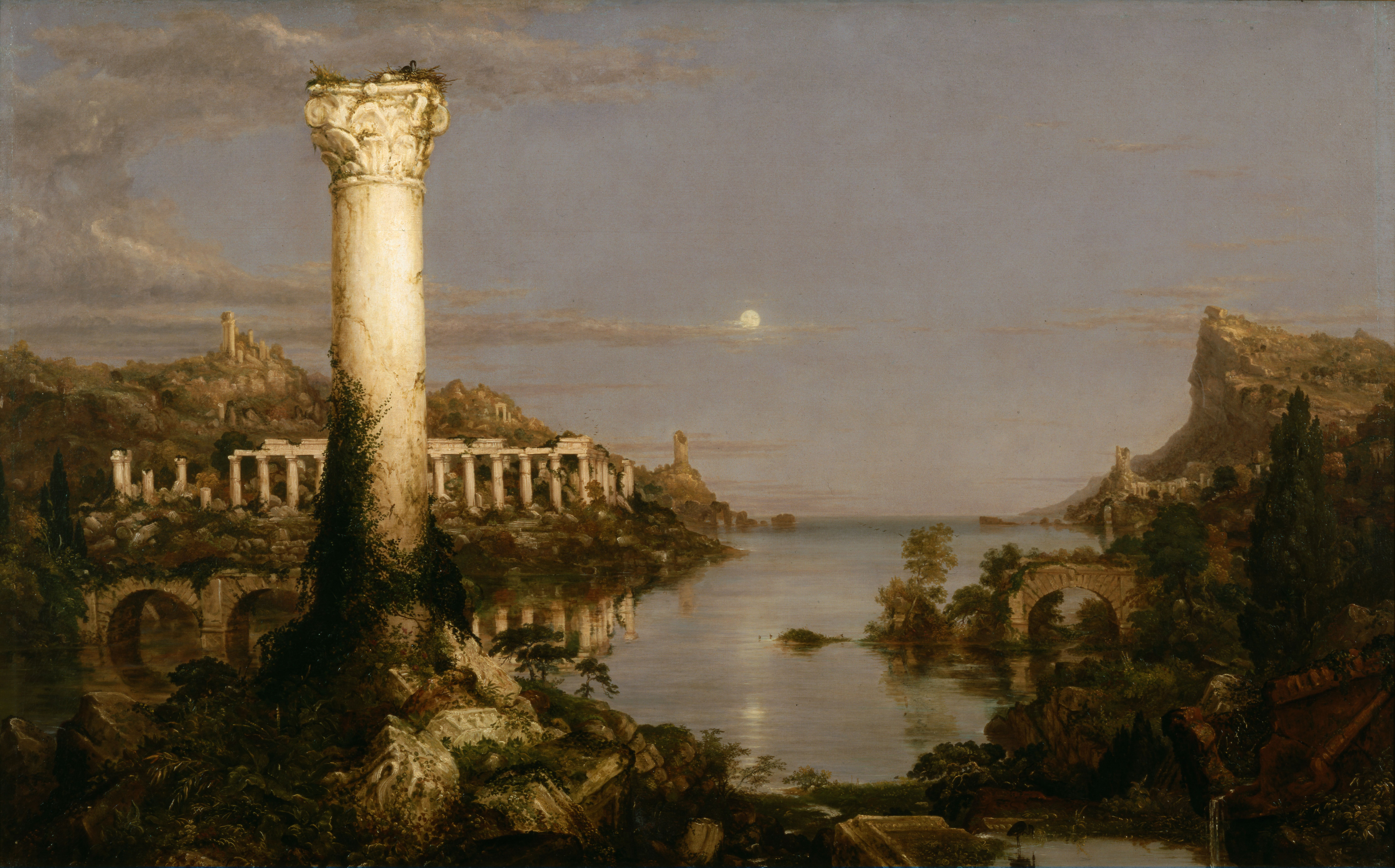
Desolation. Oil on canvas, 1836, 39 ½ × 63 ½ in.

The fifth painting, Desolation, shows the results decades later. The remains of the city are highlighted in the livid light of a dying day. The landscape has begun to return to wilderness and no humans are to be seen; but the remnants of their architecture emerge from beneath a mantle of trees, ivy, and other overgrowth. The broken stumps of the pharoi loom in the background. The arches of the shattered bridge and the columns of the temple are still visible; a single column looms in the foreground, now a nesting place for birds. The sunrise of the first painting is mirrored here by a moonrise, a pale light reflecting in the ruin-choked river while the standing pillar reflects the last rays of sunset. This gloomy picture suggests how all empires could be after their fall. It is a harsh possible future in which humanity has been destroyed by its own hand.

==== Description by Thomas Cole ====
The fifth picture is the scene of Desolation. The sun has just set, the moon ascends the twilight sky over the ocean, near the place where the sun rose in the first picture. Day-light fades away, and the shades of evening steal over the shattered and ivy-grown ruins of that once proud city. A lonely column stands near the fore ground, on whose capitol, which is illumined by the last rays of the departed sun, a heron has built her nest. The doric temple and the triumphal bridge, may still be recognised among the ruins. But, though man and his works have perished, the steep promontory, with its insulated rock, still rears against the sky unmoved, unchanged. Violence and time have crumbled the works of man, and art is again resolving into elemental nature. The gorgeous pageant has passed – the roar of battle has ceased – the multitude has sunk in the dust – the empire is extinct.

This cycle reflects Cole's pessimism, and is often seen as a commentary on Andrew Jackson and the Democratic Party. (Note, for instance, the military hero at the center of "Consummation".) However, some Democrats had a different theory of the course of empire. They saw not a spiral or cycle but a continuing upward trajectory. Levi Woodbury, a Democrat and a justice of the United States Supreme Court, for instance, responded to Cole by saying that there would be no destruction in the United States.

== See also ==
- List of paintings by Thomas Cole

== Sources ==
- Miller, Angela (1993). The Empire of the Eye: Landscape Representation and American Cultural Politics, 1825–1875. Ithaca, N.Y: Cornell University Press.
- Noble, Louis Legrand (1853). The Life and Works of Thomas Cole. Black Dome Press.
- Powell, Earl A. (1990). Thomas Cole. New York: Harry N. Abrams.
- Comegna, Anthony (March 25, 2016). "Art as Ideas: Thomas Cole's The Course of Empire". Libertarianism.org.
