= The Voyage of Life =

1842 series of paintings by Thomas Cole

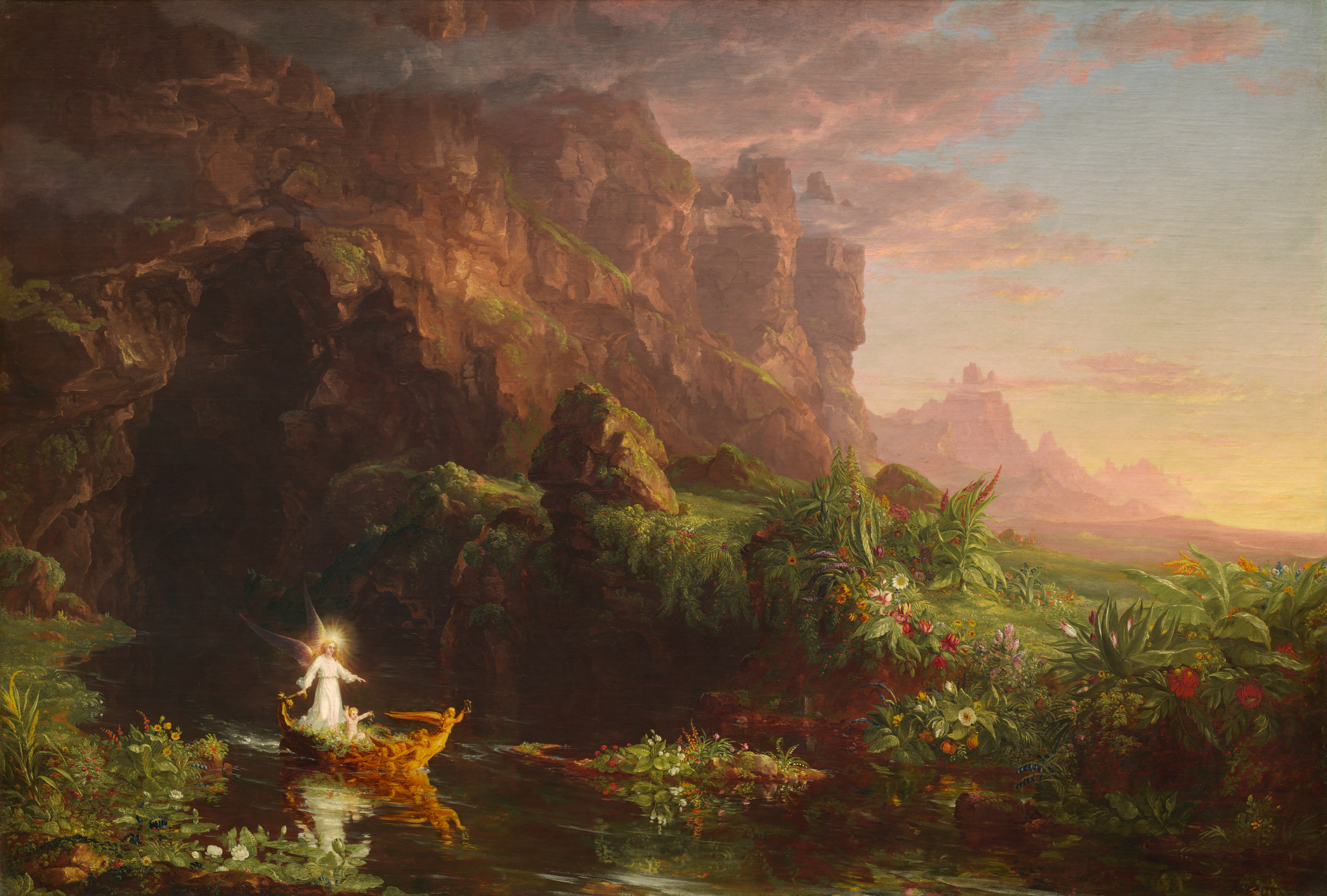
Childhood

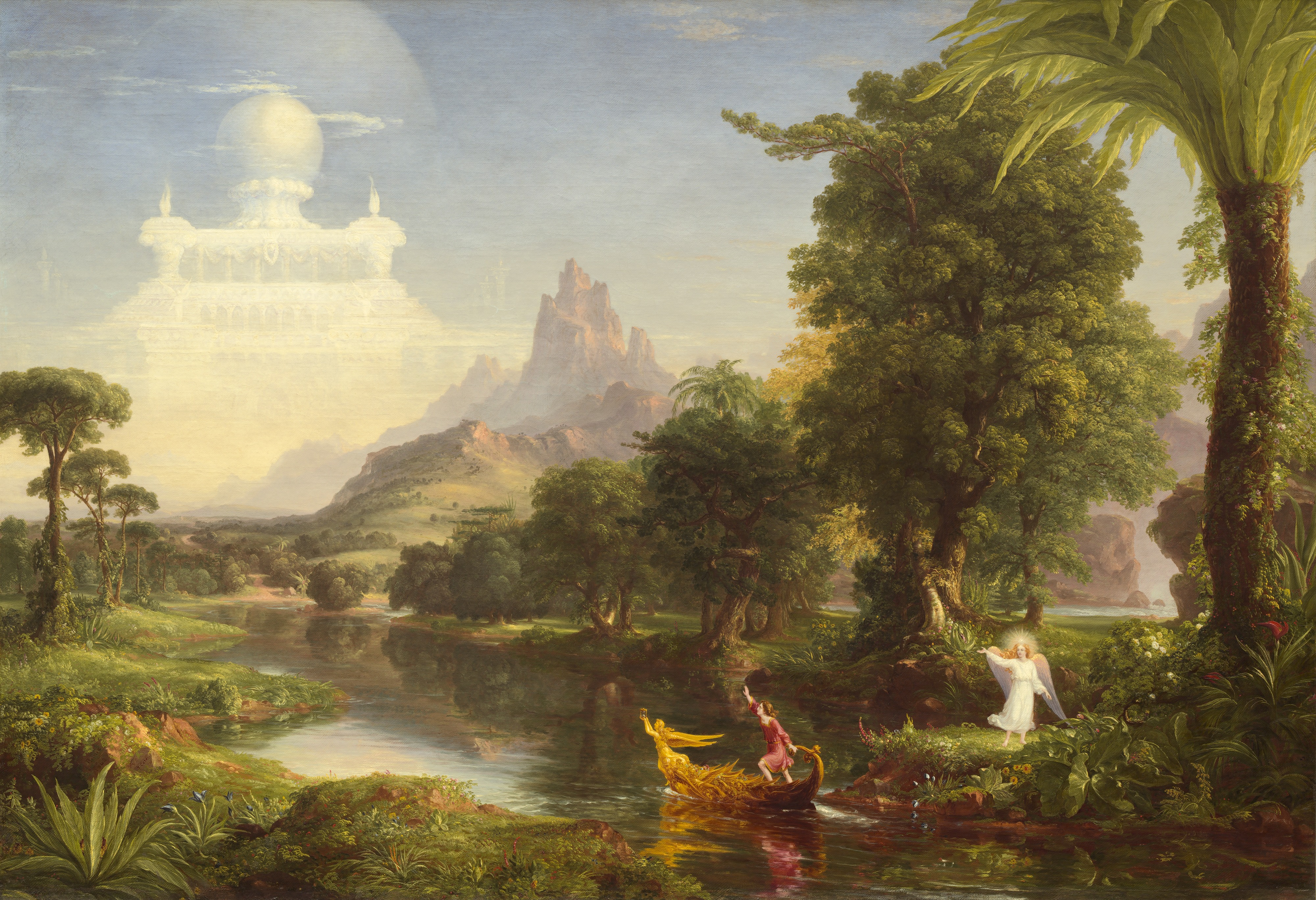
Youth

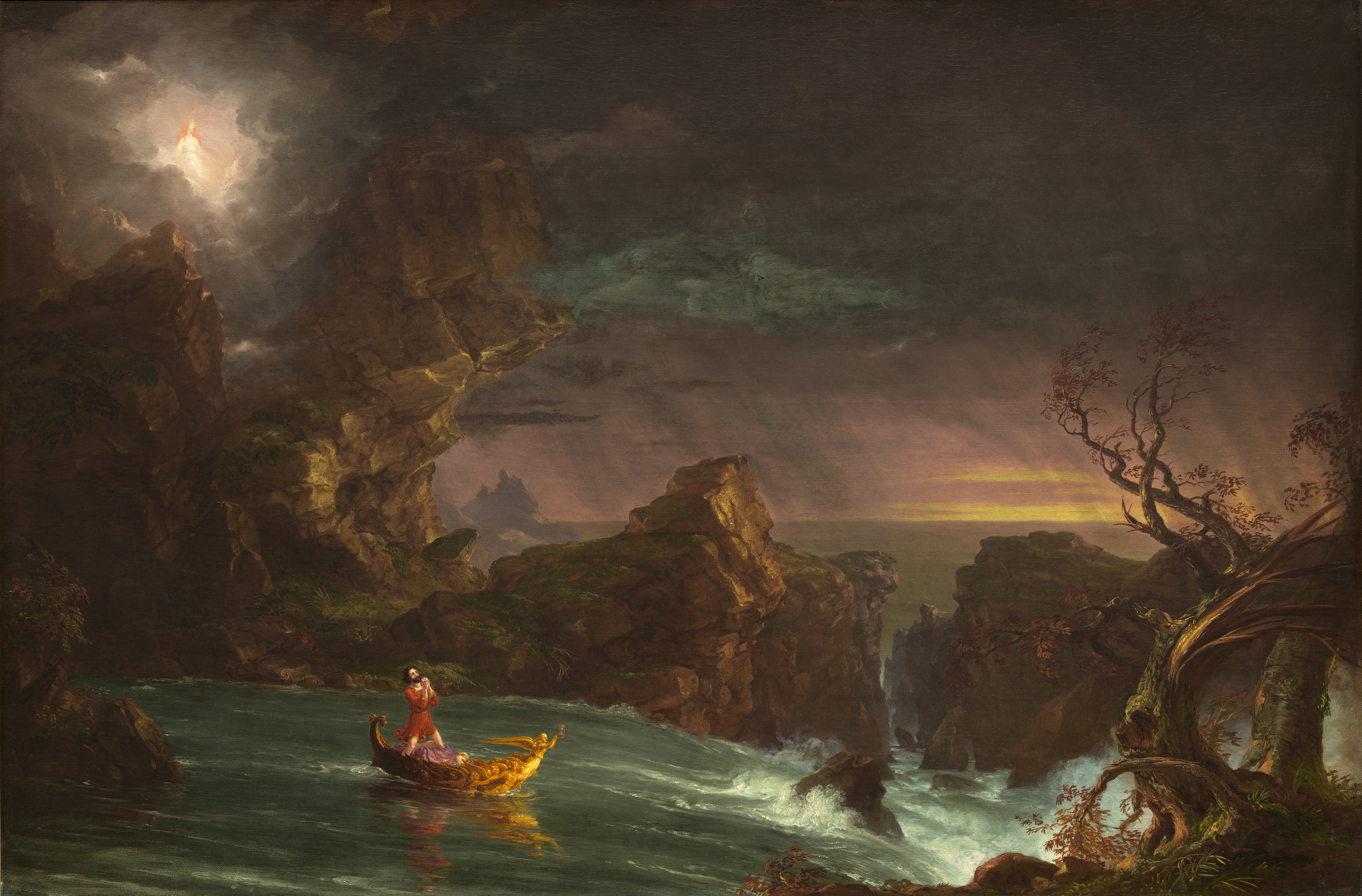
Manhood

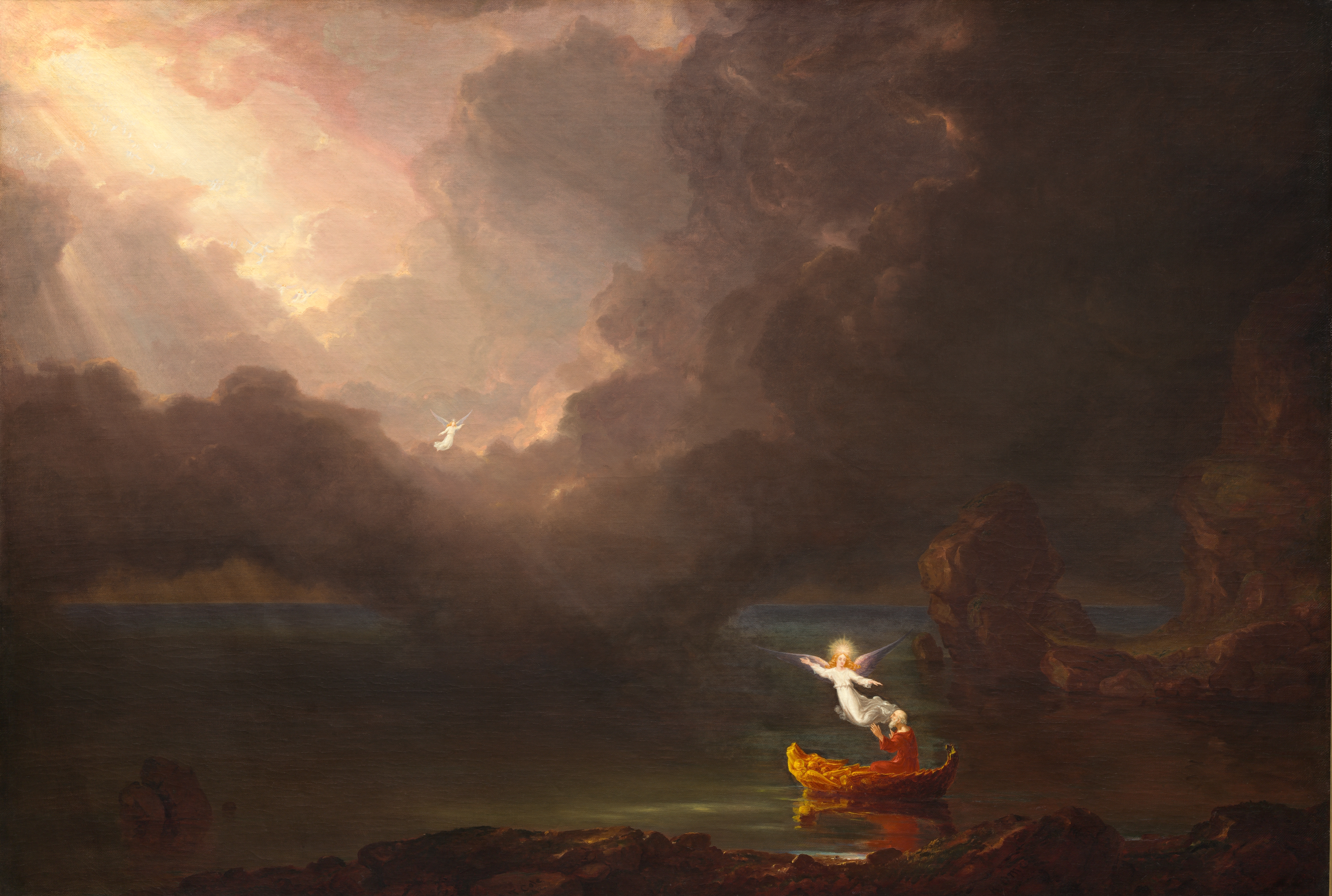
Old Age

The Voyage of Life, by Thomas Cole

The Voyage of Life is a series of four paintings created by the American artist Thomas Cole in 1840 and reproduced with minor alterations in 1842, representing an allegory of the four stages of human life. The paintings, Childhood, Youth, Manhood, and Old Age, depict a voyager who travels in a boat on a river through the mid-19th-century American wilderness. In each painting the voyager rides the boat on the River of Life accompanied by a guardian angel. The landscape, each reflecting one of the four seasons of the year, plays a major role in conveying the story. With each installment the boat's direction of travel is reversed from the previous picture. In childhood, the infant glides from a dark cave into a rich, green landscape. As a youth, the boy takes control of the boat and aims for a shining castle in the sky. In manhood, the adult relies on prayer and religious faith to sustain him through rough waters and a threatening landscape. Finally, the man becomes old and the angel guides him to heaven across the waters of eternity.

== Background ==
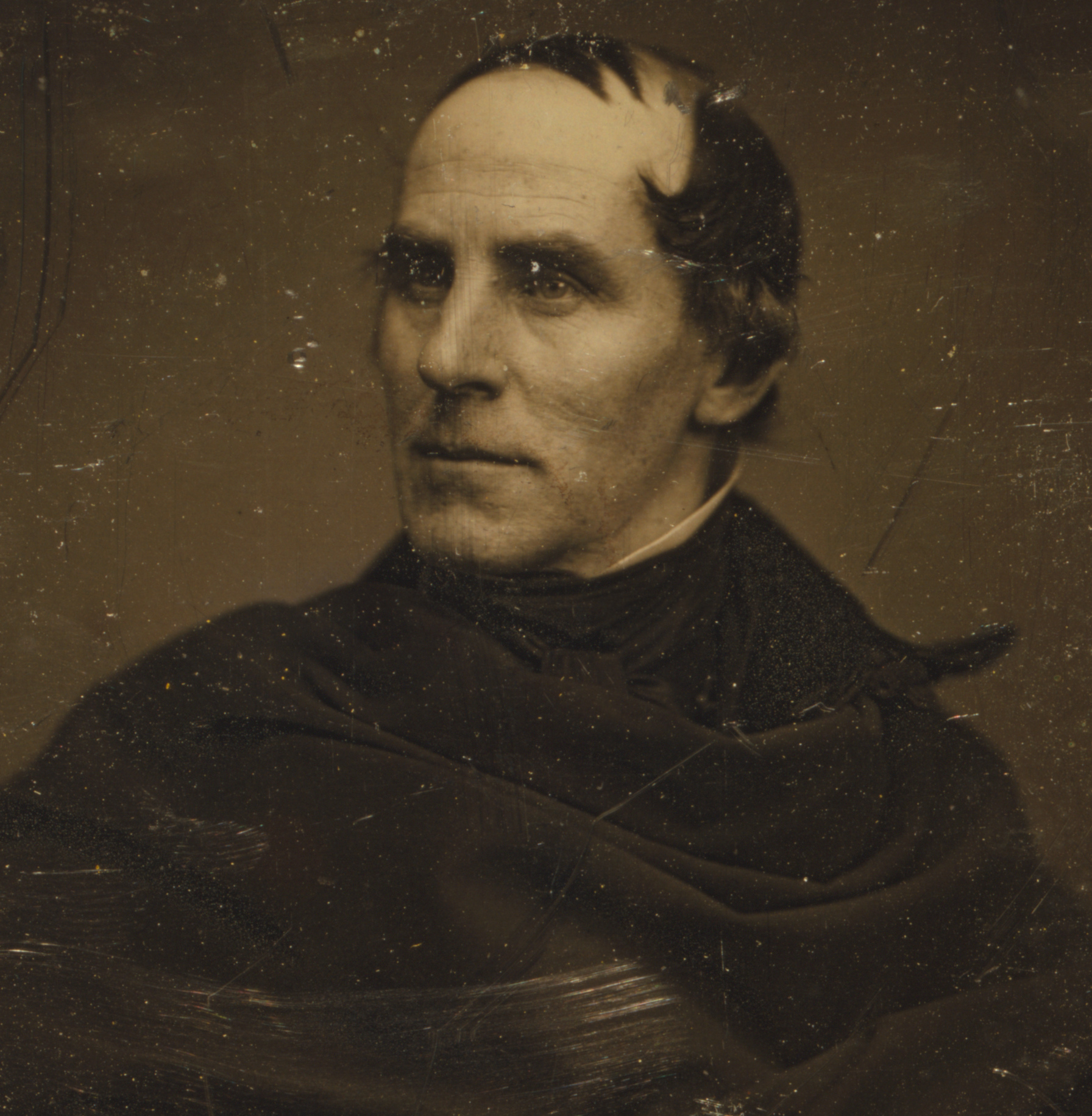
Thomas Cole, c. 1844–1848

Thomas Cole is regarded as the founder of the Hudson River School, an American art movement that flourished in the mid-19th century and was concerned with the realistic and detailed portrayal of nature but with a strong influence from Romanticism. This group of American landscape painters worked between about 1825 and 1870 and shared a sense of national pride as well as an interest in celebrating the unique natural beauty found in the United States. The wild, untamed nature found in America was viewed as its special character; Europe had ancient ruins, while America had the uncharted wilderness. As Cole's friend William Cullen Bryant sermonized in verse, so Cole sermonized in paint. Both men saw nature as God's work and as a refuge from the ugly materialism of cities. Cole clearly intended The Voyage of Life to be a didactic, moralizing series of paintings using the landscape as an allegory for religious faith.

Unlike Cole's first major series, The Course of Empire, which focused on the stages of civilization as a whole, The Voyage of Life series is a more personal, Christian allegory that interprets visually the journey of man through four stages of life: infancy, youth, manhood and old age. The originals were done on commission and completed in 1840, but a disagreement arose with the owner about a public exhibition. In 1841–42, when Cole was in Rome, he did a second set of the series which on his return to America in 1842 was successfully exhibited in several major cities and received further attention upon Cole's unexpected death in 1848. The first set is at the Munson-Williams-Proctor Arts Institute in Utica, New York, and the second set is at the National Gallery of Art in Washington, D.C.

== Works ==
The four-part series is an allegory that traces a man's voyage along the "River of Life," portraying the innocence of childhood, the confidence and ambition of youth, the trials of manhood, and the approach of death in old age. Each painting places the voyager and his guardian angel in a different part of the river and surrounding wilderness.

Art critics have ascribed a variety of potential inspirations to the work, the most obvious being the Bible's "river of life" imagery and John Bunyan's The Pilgrim's Progress, along with a variety of 19th-century poems, essays, and sermons. Cole called the series an "Allegory of Human Life" and wrote detailed descriptions of the paintings, conveying how each depicts a different stage of the man's life and spiritual development. The voyager has also been seen as a personification of America, and the series as a warning against westward expansion and industrialization.

The versions of 1842 are not exact replicas of the 1840 originals, but the alterations are generally minor. The most obvious difference is the brighter colors of the replicas, perhaps due simply to differences in available pigments.

=== Childhood ===
The Voyage of Life: Childhood
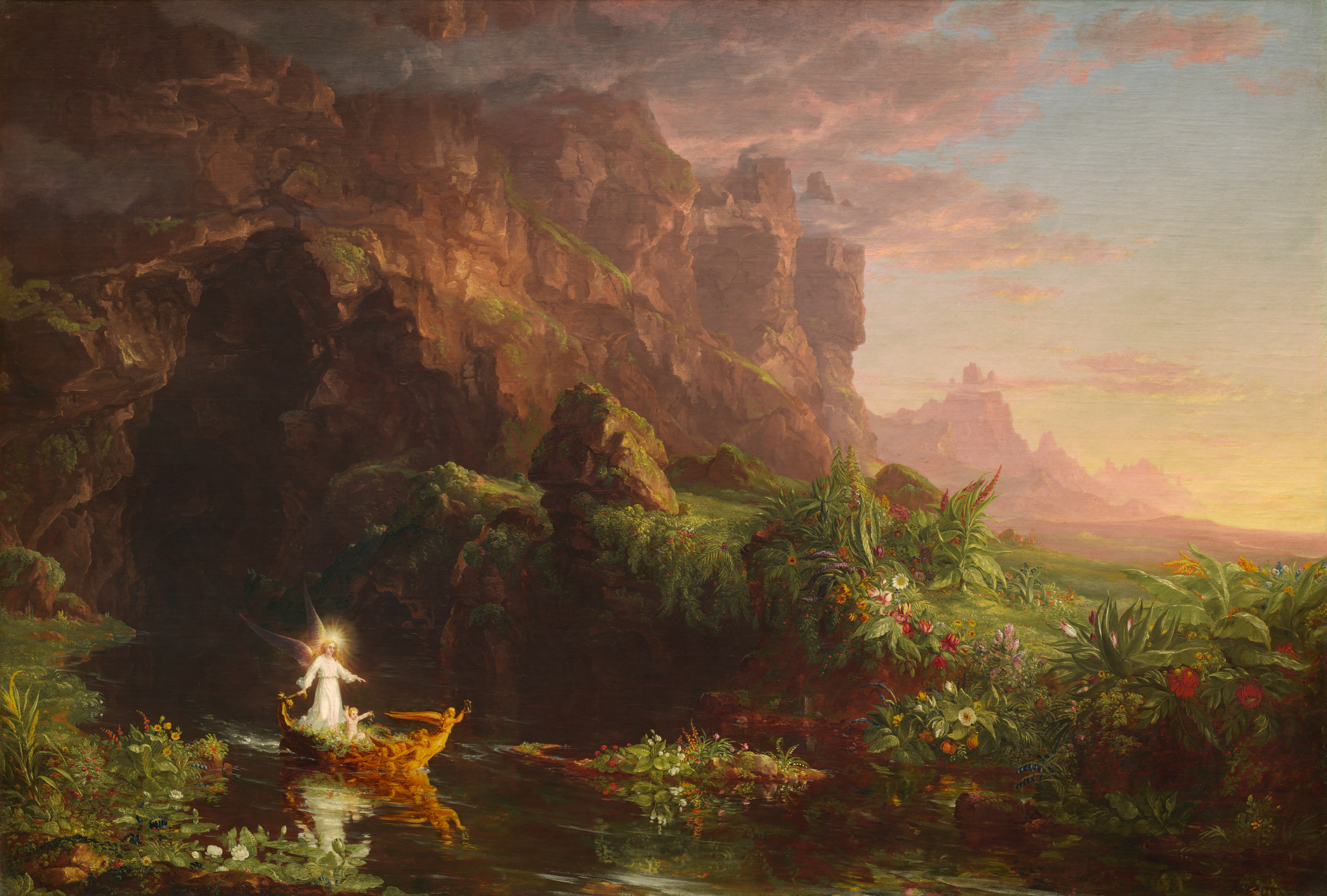
- Artist: Thomas Cole
- Year: 1842
- Medium: Oil on canvas
- Dimensions: 133 cm × 198 cm (52 in × 78 in)
- Location: National Gallery of Art

In the first painting, Childhood, all the important story elements of the series are introduced: the voyager, the angel, the river, and the expressive landscape. An infant is safely ensconced in a boat guided by an angel. The landscape is lush; everything is calm and basking in warm sunshine, reflecting the innocence and joy of childhood. The boat glides out of a dark, craggy cave which Cole himself described as "emblematic of our earthly origin, and the mysterious Past." The river is smooth and narrow, symbolizing the sheltered experience of childhood. The figurehead on the prow holds an hourglass representing time.

In the first version of this work, Cole shows less landscape on the right side and thus does not include the river winding to the horizon. The perspective is also different: in the original, the boat is in the foreground, while in the second, Cole moves the boat deeper in the picture and portrays more of the river in the foreground.

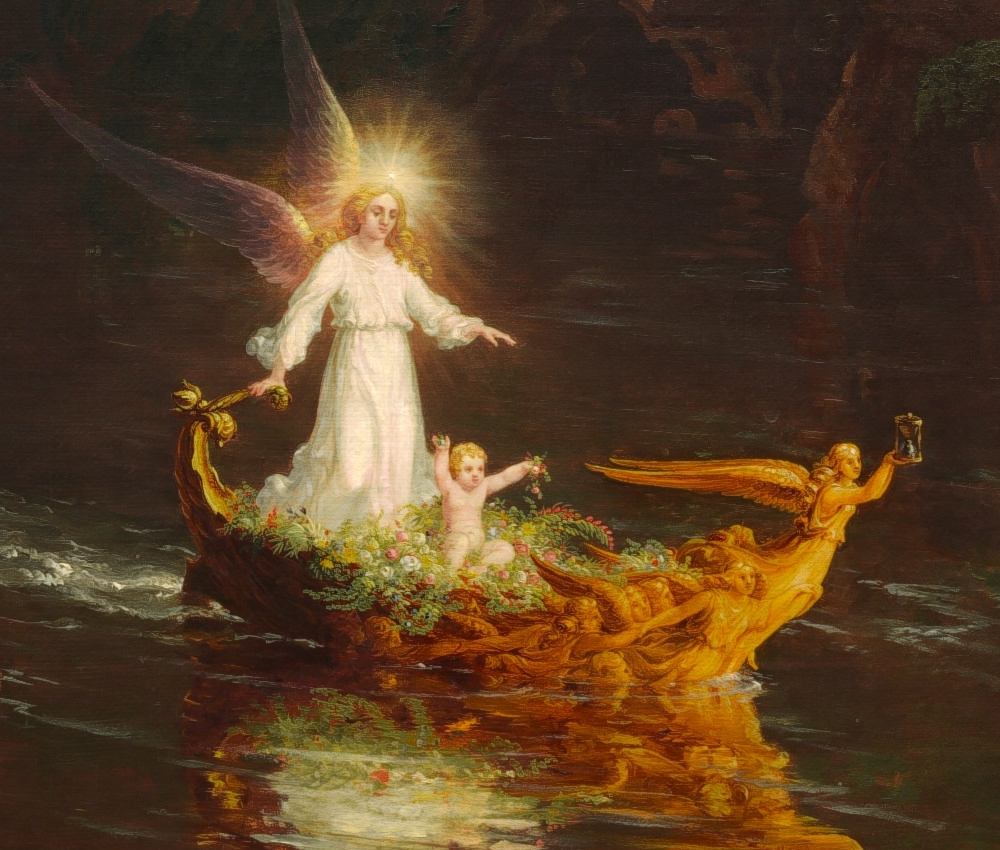
Detail of Thomas Cole's The Voyage of Life: Childhood: The boat, child, and angel on the water.

=== Youth ===
The Voyage of Life: Youth
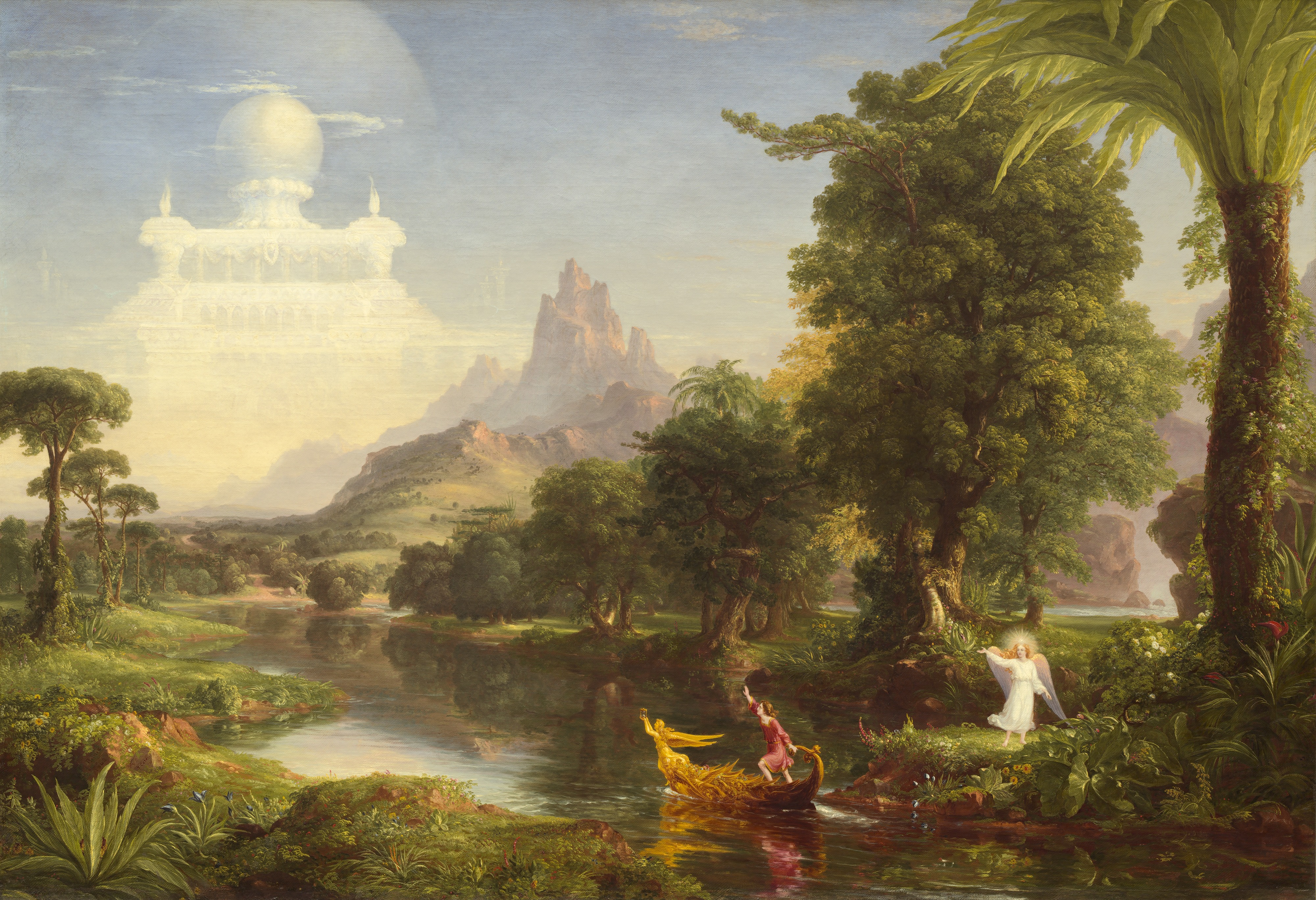
- Artist: Thomas Cole
- Year: 1842
- Medium: Oil on canvas
- Dimensions: 134 cm × 194 cm (53 in × 76 in)
- Location: National Gallery of Art

The second painting, Youth, shows the same lush, green landscape, but here the view widens as does the voyager's life experience. Now the youth has firm hold of the tiller as the angel watches and waves from the shore, allowing him to take control. The subject's youthful enthusiasm and energy is evident in his forward-thrusting pose and billowing clothes. In the distance, an ethereal citadel towers in the sky, a shimmering white beacon that represents the dreams and ambitions of humanity.

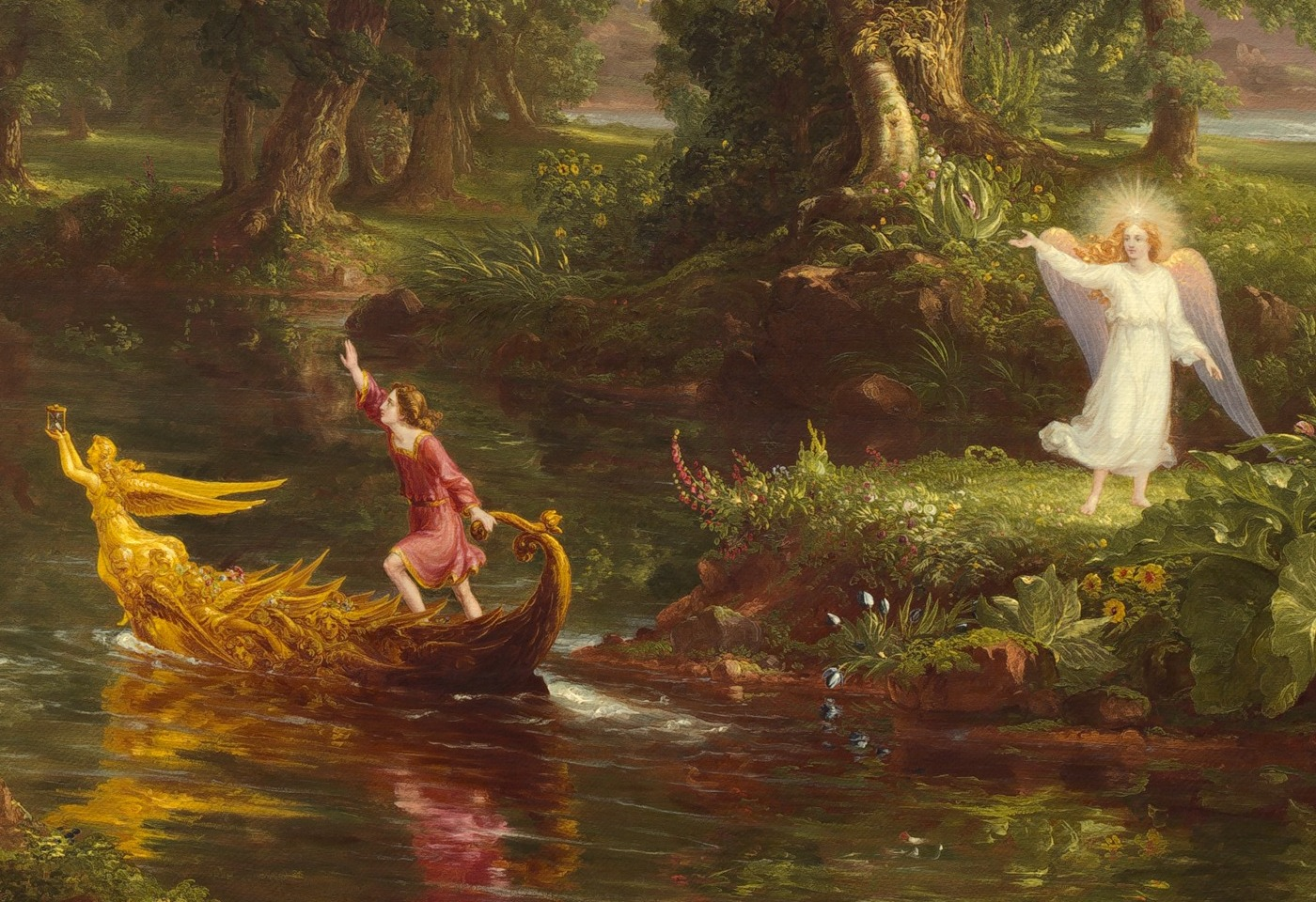
Detail of Thomas Cole's The Voyage of Life: Youth: shows the boy departing in the boat; the angel bids him farewell from the shore.

To the youth, the tranquil river appears to lead directly to the shimmering beacon, but at the far right of the painting one can just glimpse the river as it changes to become rough and difficult with the danger of rocks.

Cole comments on the landscape and the youth's ambitions: "The scenery of the picture—its clear stream, its lofty trees, its towering mountains, its unbounded distance, and transparent atmosphere—figure forth the romantic beauty of youthful imaginings, when the mind elevates the mean and common into the magnificent, before experience teaches what is the Real."

=== Manhood ===
The Voyage of Life: Manhood
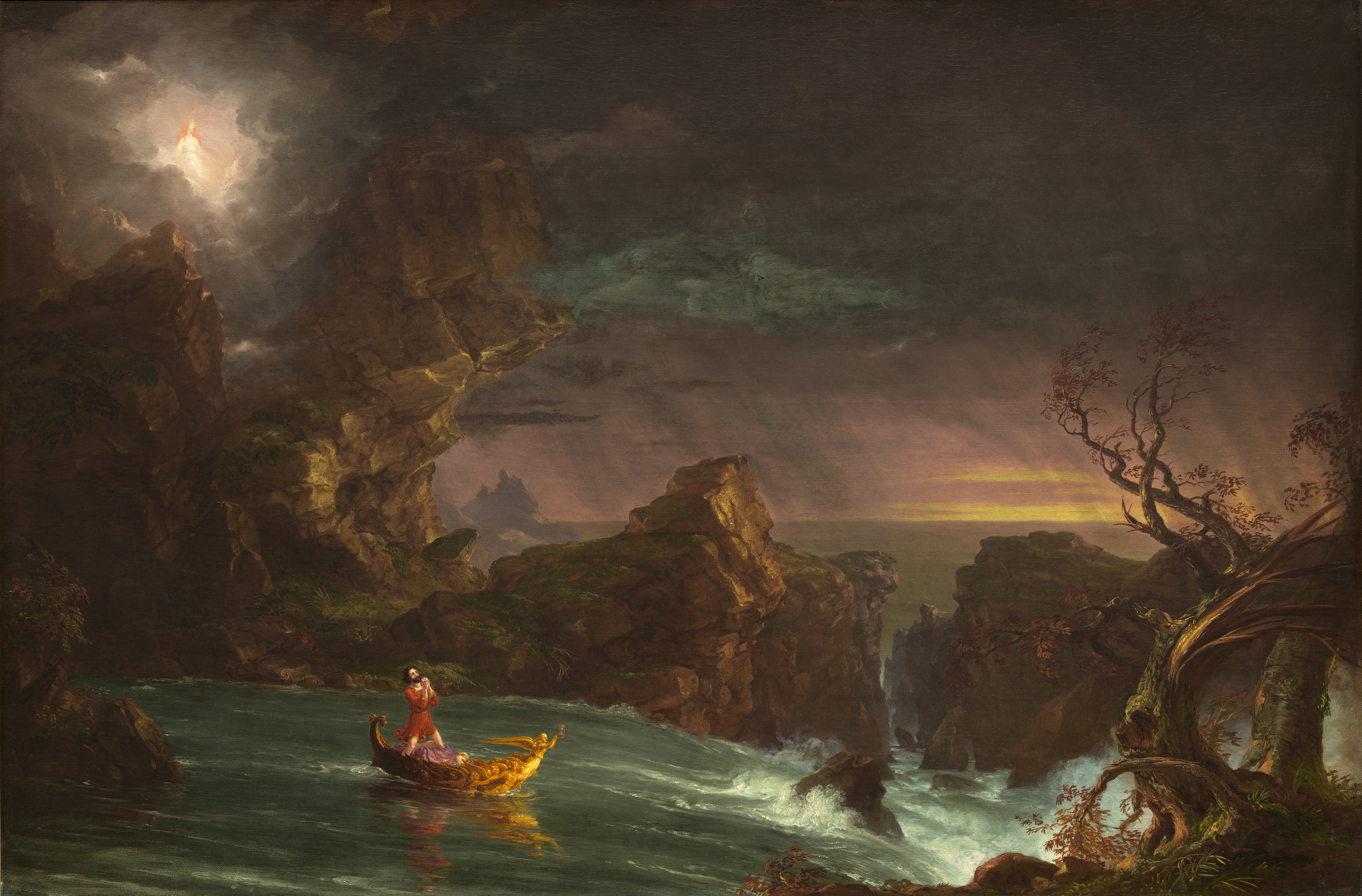
- Artist: Thomas Cole
- Year: 1842
- Medium: Oil on canvas
- Dimensions: 132.8 cm × 198.1 cm (52.3 in × 78.0 in)
- Location: National Gallery of Art

Third in the series, Manhood, shows a now grown figure in the vessel, amid the tribulations of adult life. Storm clouds ominously darken the sky, wind whips at the man's clothing and rain falls in the background as the boat approaches a treacherous part of the river which has become rocky and rapid, running through a treacherous gorge marked by a gnarled, leafless tree. Gentler country lies at the bottom of the defile and the distant sky line lightens in that direction hinting of the hope of better times ahead. Among the dangers the man has not lost his faith: he has let go of his boat's tiller (which may have broken) and is part kneeling, gazing upward with hands clasped together. The vessel's figurehead now holds the hourglass while far above, behind and unseen by the voyager, his guardian angel continues to watch over from the Heavens, shining brightly through a break in the clouds. Cole writes:

Trouble is characteristic of the period of Manhood. In Childhood there is no cankering care; in Youth no despairing thought. It is only when experience has taught us the realities of the world, that we lift from our eyes the golden veil of early life; that we feel deep and abiding sorrow; and in the picture, the gloomy, eclipse-like tone, the conflicting elements, the trees riven by tempest, are the allegory; and the Ocean, dimly seen, figures the end of life, to which the voyager is now approaching. The demon forms are Suicide, Intemperance, and Murder, which are the temptations that beset men in their direst trouble. The upward and imploring look of the voyager, shows his dependence on a Superior Power, and that faith saves him from the destruction that seems inevitable.

Manhood contains the most differences between the original 1840 version and the revised 1842 version. The modified version shows a reduction in the wall of rocks and more of the distant sea. As in Childhood, he repositioned the boat, moving it further back in the painting and closer to the rapids. He also modified the stance of the voyager, from standing in the original to kneeling in the replica.

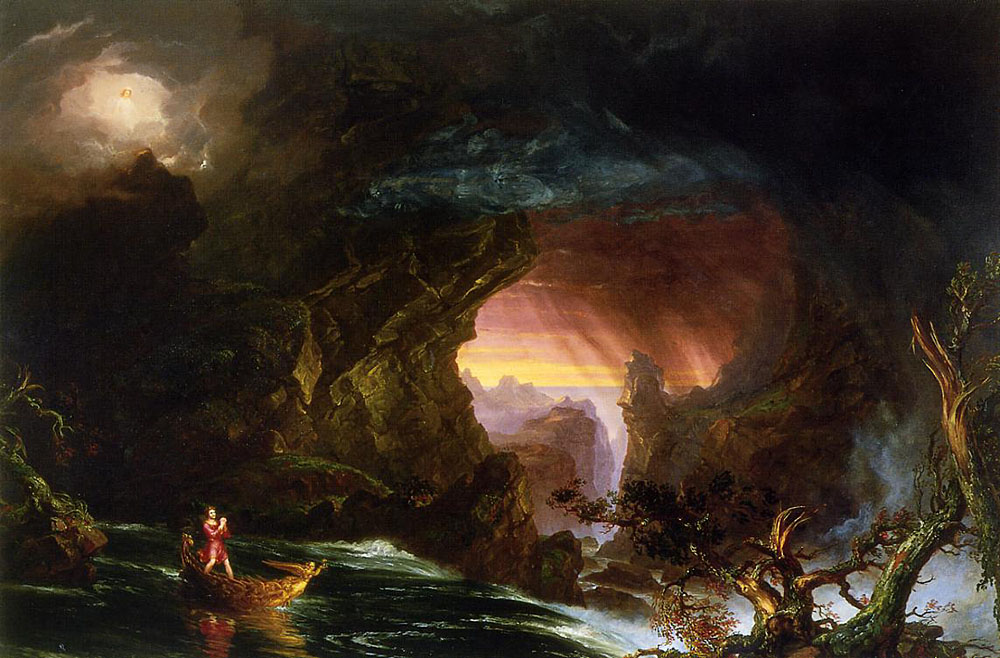
Original 1840 version of Manhood

=== Old Age ===
The Voyage of Life: Old Age
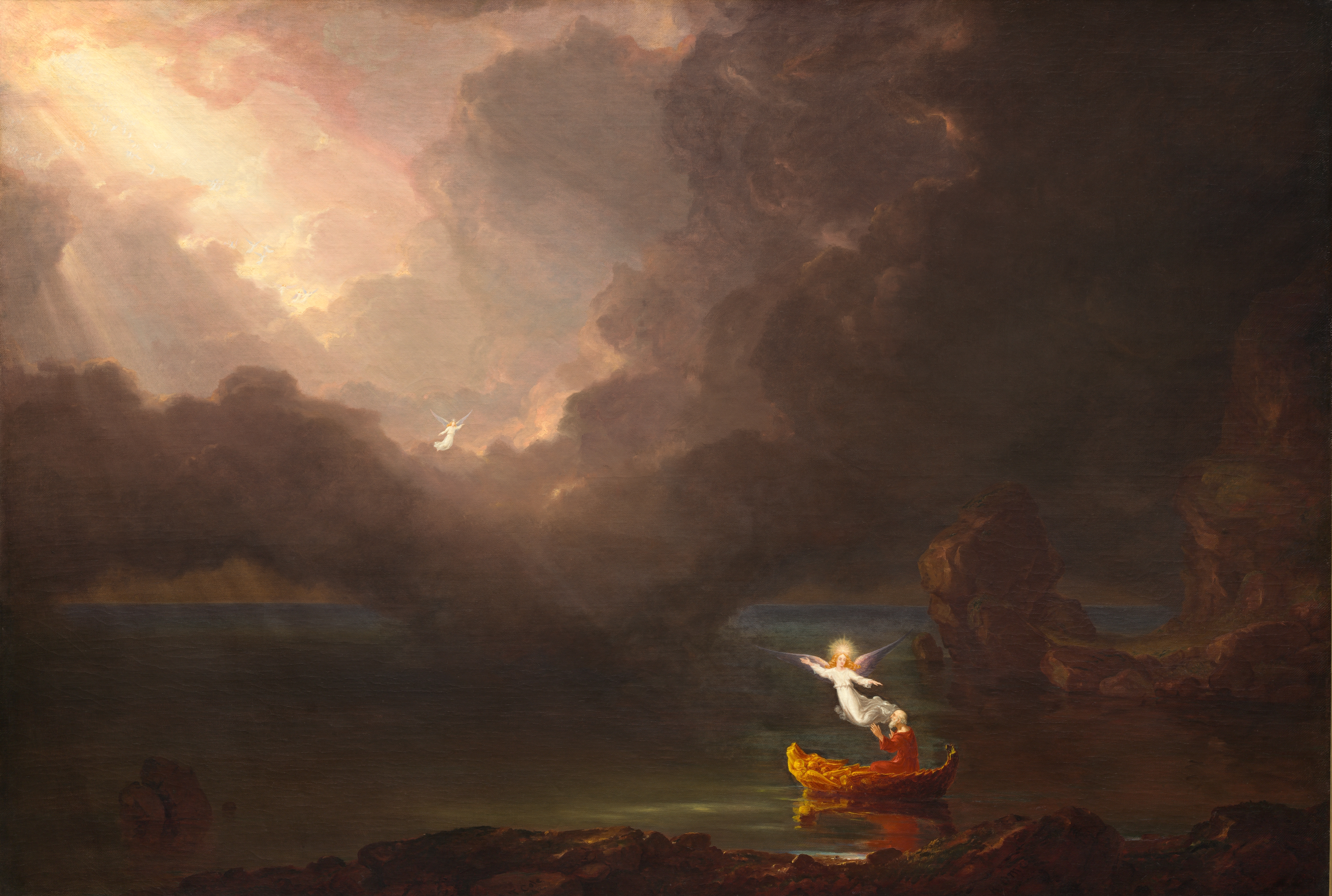
- Artist: Thomas Cole
- Year: 1842
- Medium: Oil on canvas
- Dimensions: 133.4 cm × 196.2 cm (52.5 in × 77.2 in)
- Location: National Gallery of Art

The final painting, Old Age, is an image of death. The man has grown old; he has survived the trials of life. The waters have calmed, the river flows into the waters of eternity. The figurehead and hourglass are missing from the battered boat; the withered old voyager has reached the end of earthly time. In the distance, an angel descends from heaven, while the guardian angel hovers close, gesturing toward the other. The man is once again joyous with the knowledge that Faith has sustained him through this perilous life to the promise of Heaven. The landscape is practically gone, just a few rough rocks represent the edge of the earthly world, and dark water stretches onward. Cole describes the scene: "The chains of corporeal existence are falling away; and already the mind has glimpses of Immortal Life."

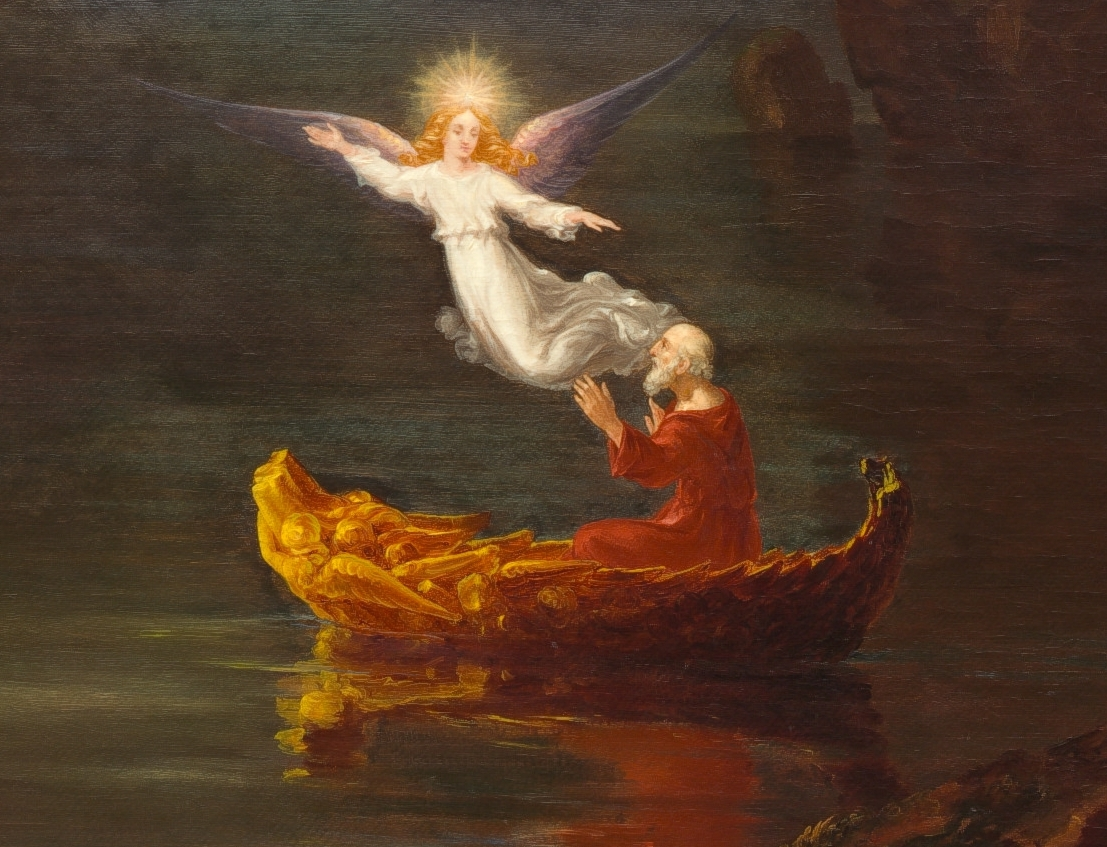
Detail of Thomas Cole's The Voyage of Life: Old Age: The man in the boat with the angel.

== Cultural significance ==
The Voyage of Life was well received by critics and the public; the United States was experiencing the religious revival sometimes known as the Second Great Awakening. The four paintings were converted to engravings by James Smillie (1807–1885) after Cole's death and the engravings widely distributed in time for the Third Great Awakening, giving the series the prestige and popular acclaim it retains today.

Old Age was used by Swedish doom metal band Candlemass as the cover to their second album, Nightfall, and Youth for their third album, Ancient Dreams.

== See also ==
- The Course of Empire, 1833–1836 series of five paintings by Cole
- List of paintings by Thomas Cole
- Hubur
- Nightfall (Candlemass album)
- Ancient Dreams
