= Samson and the Lion =

Painting by Francesco Hayez

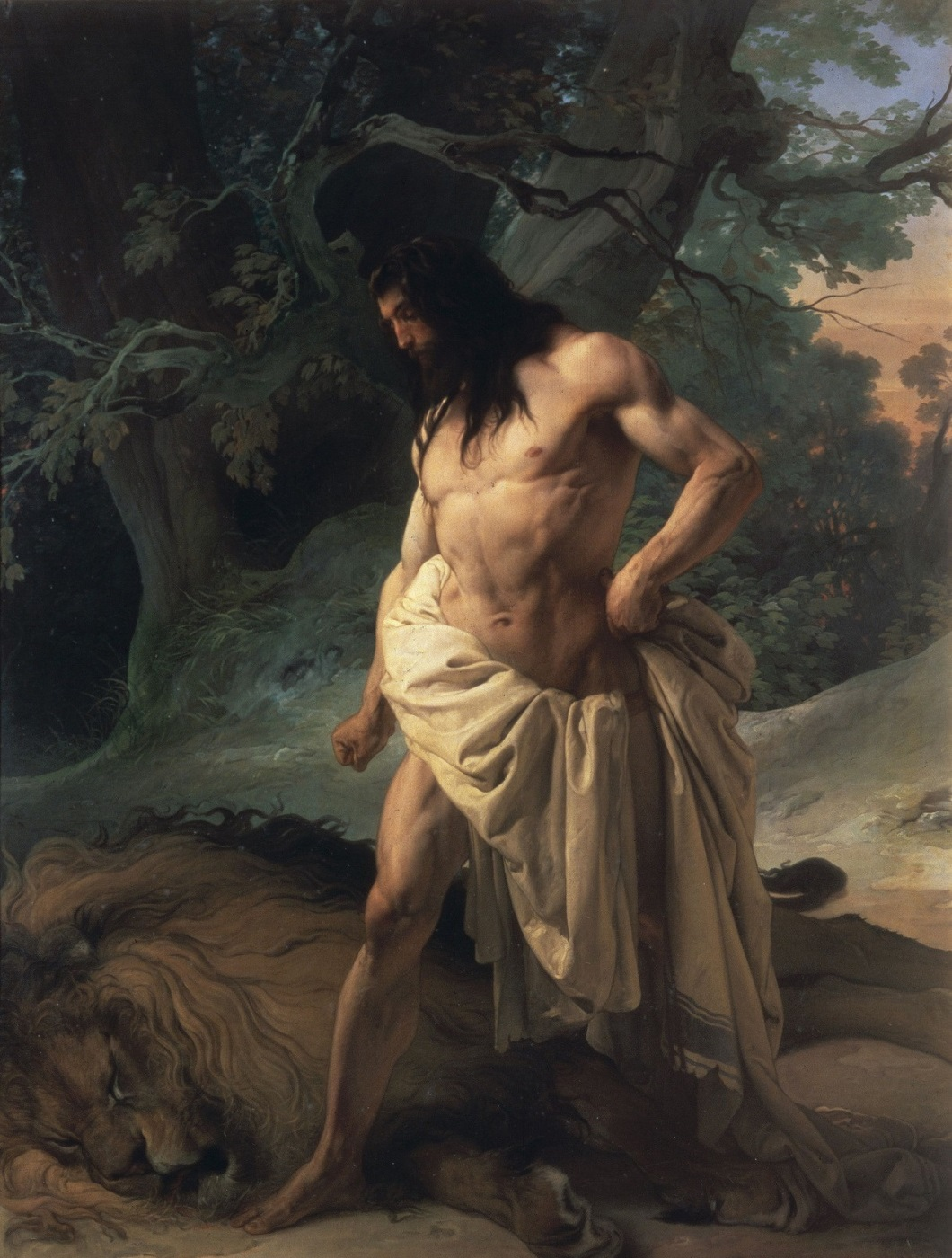
- Artist: Francesco Hayez
- Year: 1842
- Type: Oil on canvas, history painting
- Dimensions: 210 cm × 162 cm (83 in × 64 in)
- Location: Palazzo Pitti; Florence

Samson and the Lion (Italian: Sansone e il leone) is an 1842 history painting by the Italian artist Francesco Hayez. It depicts the biblical figure of Samson having just fought and defeated a lion with his bare hands. Hayez was a leading figure in the Romantic movement and produced a number of works dealing with religious themes. Today the painting is in the Gallery of Modern Art of the Palazzo Pitti in Florence.

== Bibliography ==
- Sisi, Carlo & Gavioli, Vanessa. La Galleria d'arte moderna di Palazzo Pitti: storia e collezioni. Silvana, 2005.
- Mazzocca, Fernando . Francesco Hayez: catalogo ragionato. F. Motta, 1994.
- Scott, Nancy J. Vincent Vela. Garland Publishing, 1979.
