= Luigi Cherubini and the Muse of Lyric Poetry =

1842 painting by Jean-Auguste-Dominique Ingres

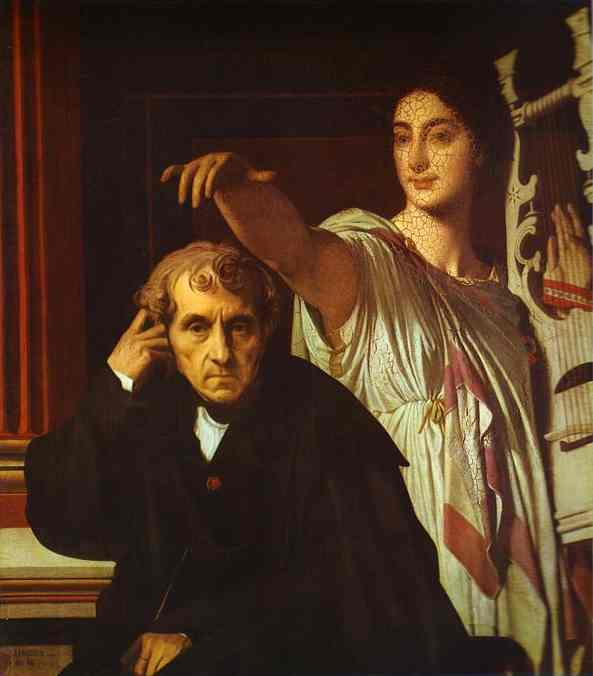

Luigi Cherubini and the Muse of Lyric Poetry is an 1842 oil-on-canvas allegorical portrait of the composer Luigi Cherubini by the French painter Jean-Auguste-Dominique Ingres and his then-pupil Henri Lehmann. It was bought from Ingres for 8,000 francs by Louis-Philippe I using civil list money in June 1842 and given to the musée du Luxembourg, before being moved in 1874 to the Louvre Museum, in whose collections it still resides.

== History ==
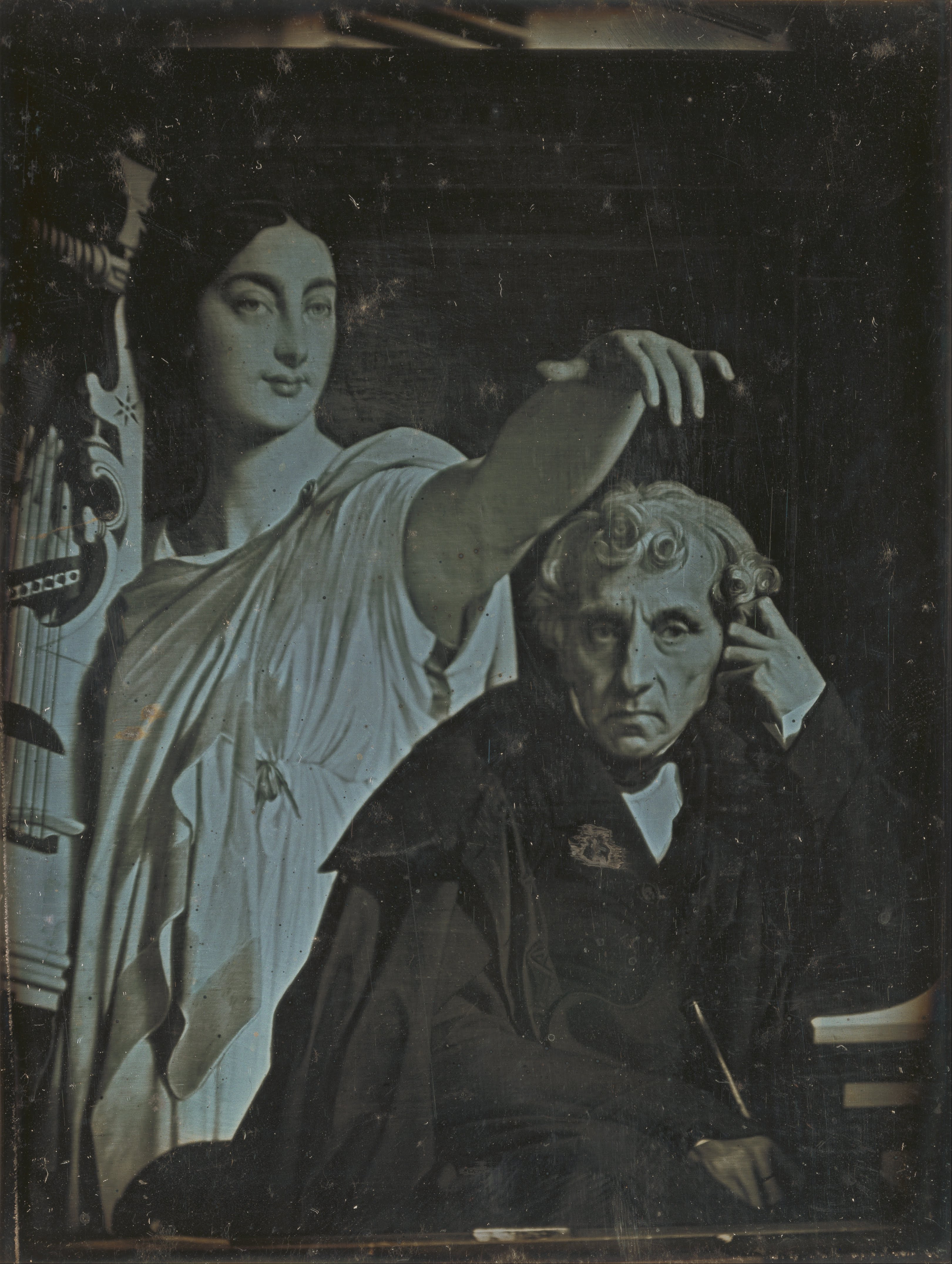
1842 daguerreotype, showing the muse before it deteriorated

The work took a long time to produce. Eighteen preparatory drawings are known to exist. It was based on an 1833 portrait of Cherubini by Ingres, of which a pre-1841 copy survives in the Cincinnati Art Museum. To create Luigi Cherubini and the Muse of Lyric Poetry, Ingres retrieved the 1833 portrait, cut the head of Cherubini from it, and had it sewn onto a larger canvas. The muse was probably painted by Lehmann – the craquelure which affects only that figure are linked to an overuse of oil and use of bitumen, which seems to indicate an artist other than Ingres, who did not use that medium.

== See also ==
- List of paintings by Jean-Auguste-Dominique Ingres

== Bibliography ==
- (in French) Daniel Ternois, Ingres, Paris, Fernand Nathan, 1980, 192 p. (ISBN 2-09-284557-8)
- Gary Tinterow (ed.) and Philip Conisbee, Portraits by Ingres : image of an epoch (exhibition catalogue), New-York, Metropolitan Museum of Art, 1999 (ISBN 0-87099-890-0, OCLC 40135348.
