= There's No Place Like Home (painting) =

Painting by Edwin Landseer

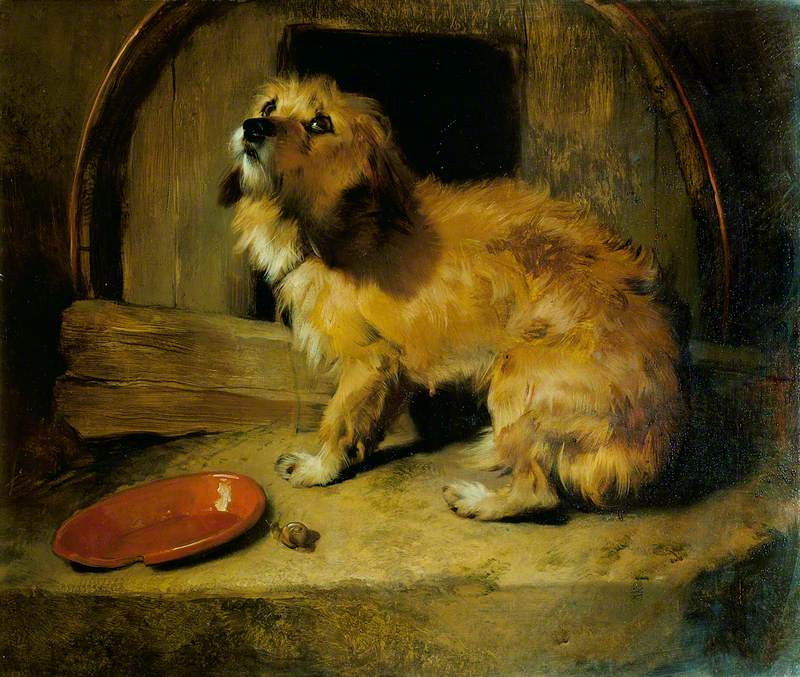
- Artist: Edwin Landseer
- Year: 1842
- Type: Oil on canvas, genre painting
- Dimensions: 63.2 cm × 75.6 cm (24.9 in × 29.8 in)
- Location: Victoria and Albert Museum; London

There's No Place Like Home is an 1842 genre painting by the British artist Edwin Landseer. Its title referencing the popular expression from the 1823 song Home! Sweet Home!, it depicts a dog outside a kennel with an empty bowl in front of him clearly hoping to be fed. One critic noted "the profoundly imploring expression with which the eyes are endowed'".

Landseer was known for his animal paintings, many of them featuring sentimental views of dogs. The painting was displayed at the annual exhibition of the British Institution in Pall Mall in 1842. Today it is in the collection of the Victoria and Albert Museum in South Kensington, having been donated as part of the Sheepshanks Gift by the art collector Joseph Sheeksphanks in 1857.

== Bibliography ==
- Farina, William. Man Writes Dog: Canine Themes in Literature, Law and Folklore. McFarland, 2014.
- Ormond, Richard. Sir Edwin Landseer. Philadelphia Museum of Art, 1981.
- Roe, Sonia. Oil Paintings in Public Ownership in the Victoria and Albert Museum. Public Catalogue Foundation, 2008.
