= Thomas Turner =

Thomas or Tom Turner may refer to:

== Politics ==
- Thomas Turner (15th century MP) for Rochester
- Thomas Turner (fl.1559), MP for Reading
- Thomas Turner (died c. 1586), MP for Bath
- Thomas Turner (congressman) (1821–1900), U.S. congressman from Kentucky, 1877–1881
- Thomas G. Turner (1810–1875), governor of Rhode Island
- Thomas Frewen Turner (1811–1870), British member of parliament for South Leicestershire
- Thomas J. Turner (1815–1874), U.S. representative from Illinois
- Thomas J. Turner (Georgia politician) (1932–2016), American politician
- Tom Turner (Michigan politician), American politician

== Sports ==
- Thomas Turner (cricketer) (1865–1936), Australian cricketer
- Thomas Turner (footballer) (fl. 1884), Scottish international footballer
- Thomas Turner (sport shooter) (born 1972), Australian sport shooter
- Tom Turner (catcher) (1916–1986), American Major League catcher, 1940–1944
- Tom Turner (first baseman) (1915–2013), American Negro league baseball player
- T. J. Turner (defensive lineman) (Tommy James Turner), American football defensive end
- T. J. Turner (linebacker) (Thomas Samuel Turner III), American football linebacker

== Others ==
- Thomas Turner (dean of Canterbury) (1591–1672), Anglican dean
- Thomas Turner (diarist) (1729–1793), English diarist
- Thomas Turner (metallurgist) (1861–1951), University of Birmingham
- Thomas Turner (microbiologist) (1902–2002), Dean of Johns Hopkins Medical School, 1957–1968
- Thomas Turner (naval officer) (1807–1883), U.S. Navy rear admiral
- Thomas Turner (president) (1645–1714), Anglican clergyman and academic
- Thomas Turner (potter) (1749–1809), English potter
- Thomas Turner (surgeon) (1793–1873), English founder of a medical school in Manchester
- Thomas C. Turner (1882–1931), U.S. Marine Corps colonel
- Thomas Hudson Turner (1815–1852), archaeologist and architectural historian
- T. M. Turner (Thomas Memory Turner, 1847–1917), American musician
- Thomas Price Turner (c. 1790–1868), professor of music at Exeter Cathedral, first cousin of J. M. W. Turner and one of his heirs
- Thomas R. Turner II (born 1955), U.S. Army general
- Thomas Wyatt Turner (1877–1978), civil rights activist and biologist
- Tom Turner (born 1946), English landscape artist and author

== See also ==
- Tommy Turner (disambiguation)
