= Snow Storm: Steam-Boat off a Harbour's Mouth =

Painting by J. M. W. Turner

Snow Storm
- Snow Storm: Steam-Boat off a Harbour's Mouth Making Signals in Shallow Water, and going by the Lead: The Author Was in This Storm on the Night the Ariel Left Harwich.
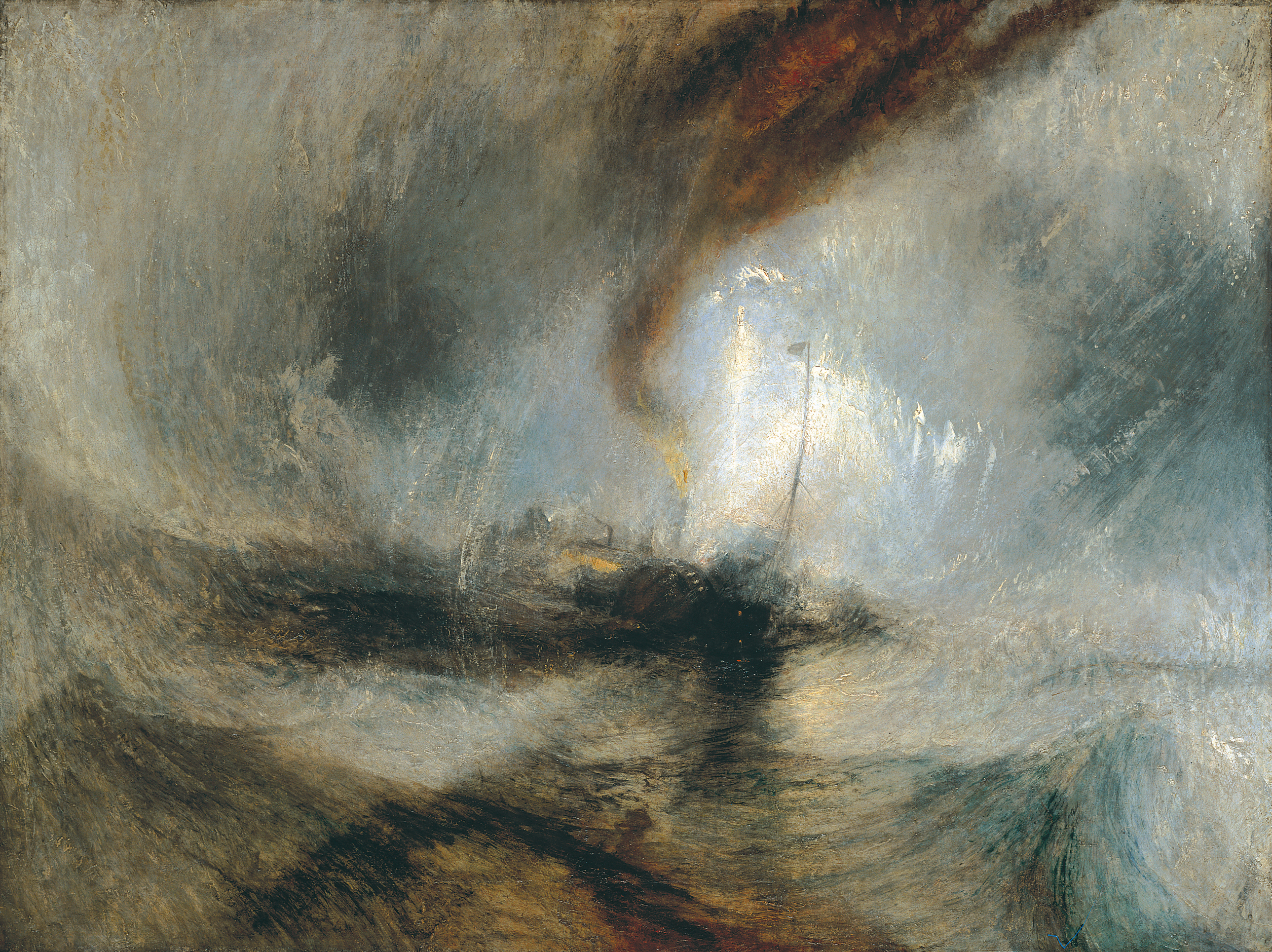
- Artist: J. M. W. Turner
- Year: 1842
- Medium: Oil on canvas
- Dimensions: 91.5 cm × 122 cm (36 in × 48 in)
- Location: Tate Britain, London
- Accession: N00530
- Website: tate.org.uk/...n00530

Snow Storm: Steam-Boat off a Harbour's Mouth is an oil on canvas painting by the English Romantic artist J. M. W. Turner (1775–1851). It depicts a paddle steamer in a rough sea caught in a violent storm, rendered as a dark, menacing vortex. It was first exhibited at the Royal Academy of Arts's annual Summer Exhibition in 1842, the same year it was painted.

Turner sought to convey human helplessness in the face of violent natural forces, which overpower even contemporary technology. To do so, he departed from classical academic techniques, which attracted strong and even dismissive criticism from traditionalists. However, the contemporary art critic John Ruskin praised the work as Turner's greatest marine painting. Modern art historians widely regard it as one of his masterpieces.

Turner kept the painting his whole life, and it was part of his bequest to the nation upon his death. It is displayed in the Tate Britain museum in London.

== Background ==
Turner is recorded by Ruskin as having recounted an apocryphal claim as the inspiration for the Snow Storm after it was first exhibited, clarifying the subtitle "The Author was in this Storm on the Night the Ariel left Harwich":

I did not paint it to be understood, but I wished to show what such a scene was like; I got the sailors to lash me to the mast to observe it; I was lashed for four hours, and I did not expect to escape, but I felt bound to record it if I did. But no one had any business to like the picture.

This has been disputed by modern art historians, who doubt the literal truth of the account. For instance, Martin Butlin and Evelyn Joll observed that although there was a paddle steamer by the name of Ariel which was sailing at the time, there is no record of it departing from Harwich up to 1842. Furthermore, at the time Turner was 67 years old and in poor health; it is unlikely that he could have survived exposure to freezing temperatures and physical disorientation for the period of time he gave. Hence, it has been taken as an analogical concept which he gave for the painting's intent and effect.

Turner had previously depicted steamboats in at least five paintings, including Staffa, Fingal's Cave (1832), Rotterdam Ferry-Boat (1833), and The Fighting Temeraire (1839).

== Description ==
The Snow Storm is a depiction of a dense, turbulent snowstorm engulfing a paddle steamer, navigating a rough sea at an unspecified time of day. Owing to Turner's increasing focus on depicting the atmospheres of weather conditions and other phenomena, the steamer is barely recognisable, with the menacing storm further decreasing the visual clarity of the scene. The pale light surrounding the boat creates a strong focal point, disrupted by the bellowing smoke from the engine of the steamboat, which in turn reflects on the sea. To this effect, Turner used a colour palette that includes shades of grey, green, and brown, whilst adding texture to the painting with an impasto technique.

== Style and technique ==
One of Turner's pictorial objectives was to convey the sensation of the motion of wind in painting strokes. He is recorded as having said that "the greatest difficulty of the painter's art [is] to produce wavy air, as some call the wind". The Snow Storm combines the storm and the engine smoke into a swirling vortex. Turner sought to demonstrate that painting could rival or even surpass poetry in evoking the sublime. His challenge was to find a way to represent indisticness and obscurity. To do this, he had to develop a new pictorial language that prioritised the elemental energy of nature over a realistic representation of forms.

Classical painting traditions that had been established during the Renaissance and were still adhered to at the time called for the literal depiction of forms, linear perspective, smooth gradations of colour, and a paint surface in which brushwork was imperceptible. (Note: Classic painting accomplished this by use of the sfumato technique to hide the change of colours, with its most prominent practitioner being Leonardo da Vinci.) Turner broke all of these rules in the Snow Storm. He blurs forms to the point that the steamboat is barely distinguishable from its surroundings, he uses a novel vortical composition instead of linear perspective, his coluring has abrupt tonal shifts, and his brushstrokes are forceful and distinct in order to convey the chaotic swirling of wind, ocean spray and steamboat smoke. As Gowing notes, "anyone who brought to painting a force and an ambition like Turner's found himself in rivalry with the past."

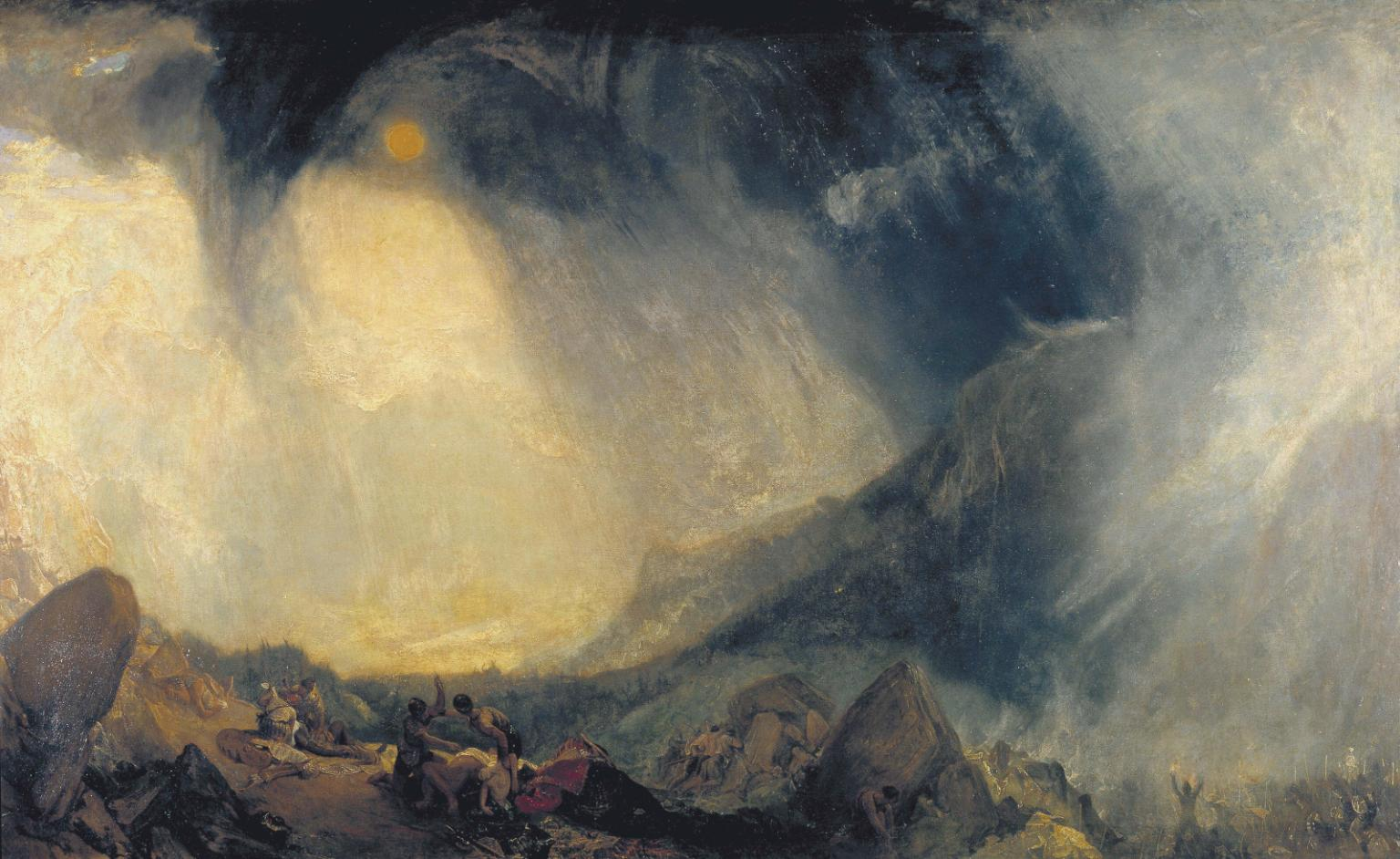
J.M.W Turner, Snow Storm: Hannibal and his Army Crossing the Alps (1812). Tate Britain, London.

Turner first depicted snowstorms thirty years earlier in Snow Storm: Hannibal and his Army Crossing the Alps (1812), featuring a violent snow storm depicted as a vortex that dwarfs the battle below, between Hannibal's army and an Alpine tribe. This was the first time he had used a vortical composition, which he repeated in the Snow Storm. According to Wilton, with these two works, "after decades of debate over whether painting could capture the essence of the sublime, Turner finally 'grasped the sublime bull by the horns' and ended that discussion."

== Critical reception ==
The innovative techniques Turner used in this painting generated strong negative and even dismissive comments from conservative critics and academics who believed painters should continue to use classical techniques. One critic famously referred to it as "soapsuds and whitewash". (Note: Turner was very annoyed by this, and was heard repeating "Soapsuds and whitewash!" over and over again, adding, "What would they have? I wonder what they think the sea's like? I wish they'd been in it".) The Athenaeum wrote:

This gentleman has, on former occasions, chosen to paint with cream, or chocolate, yolk of egg, or currant jelly – here he uses his whole array of kitchen stuff. Where the steam-boat is – where the harbour begins or where it ends [...] are matters past our finding out.

However, in Modern Painters (1843), Ruskin praised it as Turner's best marine painting.

Modern art historians consider the Snow Storm one of Turner's masterpieces. Shanes describes it as "Turner’s finest seascape, and possibly the greatest depiction of a storm in all art." For Ibata, with this work, "[Turner] provided one of the most adequate pictorial responses to the challenge initiated by Burke's Enquiry, [initiating] a radical transformation of the pictorial medium." And Moorby observes more generally, that due to his increasingly expressive representation of nature, "Turner has remained an enduring model and touchstone for later practitioners working with immersive light and atmospheric space."

== Legacy ==
In 1966, the New York Museum of Modern Art exhibition "Turner: Imagination and Reality" prominently displayed the Snow Storm, framing it in contemporary art history as an example of how Turner's late compositions and techniques anticipated the mid-20th century American abstract expressionist movement.

== See also ==
- List of paintings by J. M. W. Turner
