= Johns Hopkins Hospital =

Hospital in Baltimore, Maryland, US

- Johns Hopkins Medicine

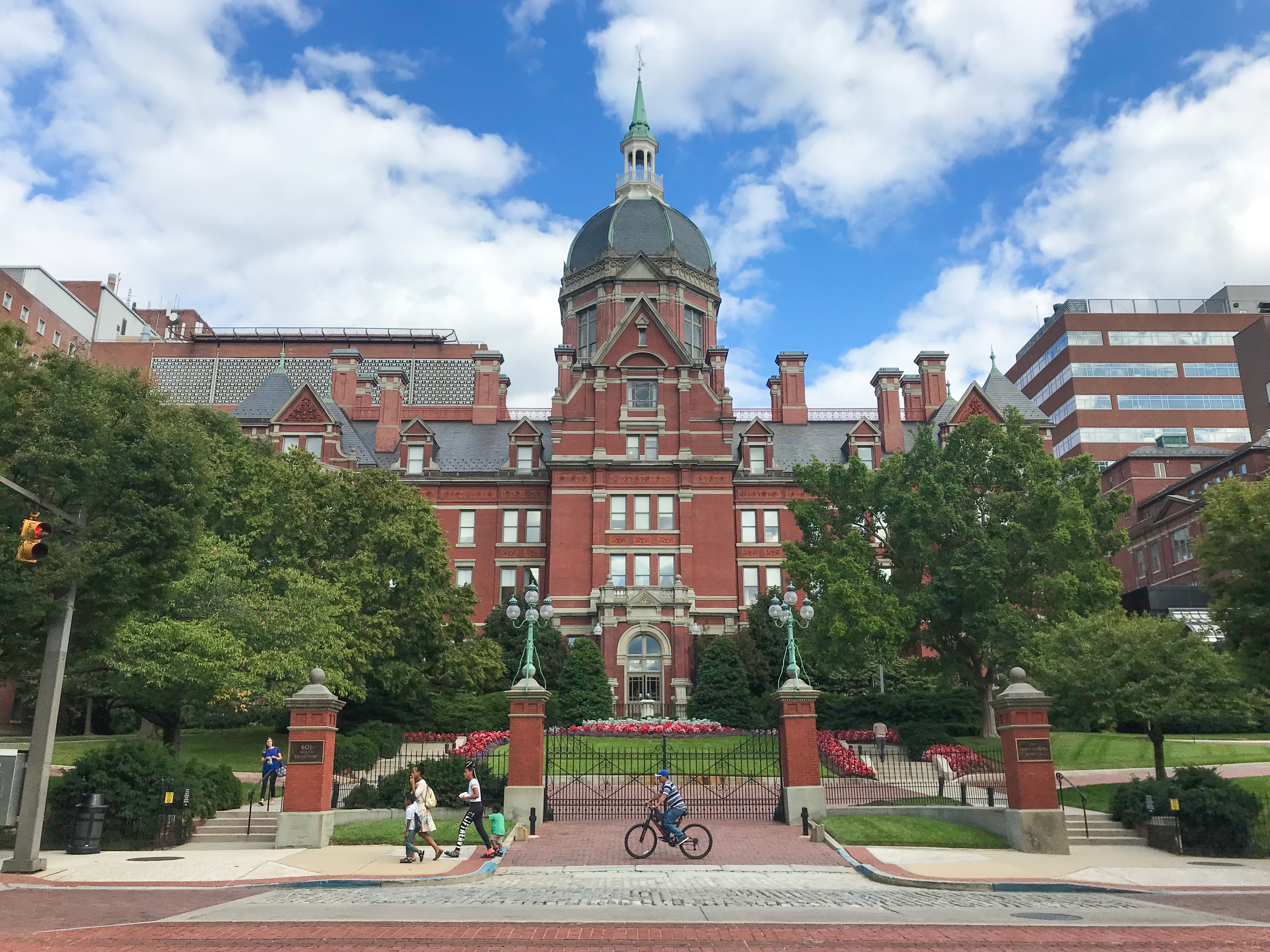
- JHH's original Billings Building in 2019

Geography
- Location: 1800 Orleans Street, Baltimore, Maryland, U.S.
- Coordinates: 39°17′46″N 76°35′30″W

Organisation
- Type: Teaching
- Affiliated university: Johns Hopkins School of Medicine

Services
- Emergency department: Level I Trauma Center
- Beds: 1,166

Helipads
- Helipad: FAA LID: 17MD replaces 0MD3 closed 2012
Number	Length		Surface
Number	ft	m	Surface
H1	46	14	rooftop (concrete)

History
- Founded: 1889

Links
- Website: hopkinsmedicine.org/the-johns-hopkins-hospital
- Lists: Hospitals in U.S.
- Other links: Johns Hopkins Bayview Medical Center
- Johns Hopkins Hospital Complex
- U.S. National Register of Historic Places
- Location: 601 North Broadway, Baltimore, Maryland, U.S.
- Area: 8 acres (3.2 ha)
- Built: 1889
- Architects: Cabot & Chandler, and others
- Architectural style: Queen Anne style
- NRHP reference No.: 75002094
- Added to NRHP: February 24, 1975

Johns Hopkins Hospital (JHH) is the teaching hospital and biomedical research facility of Johns Hopkins School of Medicine in Baltimore, Maryland. Incorporated in 1867 and opened in 1889, Johns Hopkins Hospital and its school of medicine are the birthplace of numerous famed medical traditions, including rounds, residents, and house staff. Several medical specialties were founded at the hospital, including neurosurgery by Harvey Cushing and Walter Dandy, cardiac surgery by Alfred Blalock and Vivien Thomas, and child psychiatry by Leo Kanner. Johns Hopkins Children's Center, which serves infants, children, teens, and young adults aged 0–21, is attached to the hospital.

Johns Hopkins Hospital is widely regarded as one of the world's greatest hospitals and medical institutions. For 21 consecutive years from 1991 to 2020, it was ranked as the best overall hospital in the United States by U.S. News & World Report. In its 2019–2020 edition, U.S. News & World Report ranked the hospital on 15 adult specialties and 10 children's specialties; the hospital came in 1st in Maryland and third nationally behind the Mayo Clinic in Rochester, Minnesota, and Massachusetts General Hospital in Boston. In 2021, the hospital marked 32 consecutive years of placing in the top five hospitals in the nation.

The hospital's founding in 1889 was made possible from a philanthropic bequest of over $7 million by city merchant, banker, financier, civic leader, and philanthropist Johns Hopkins, which at the time was the largest bequest in the history of the United States. The hospital is located at 600 North Broadway in Baltimore.

== History ==
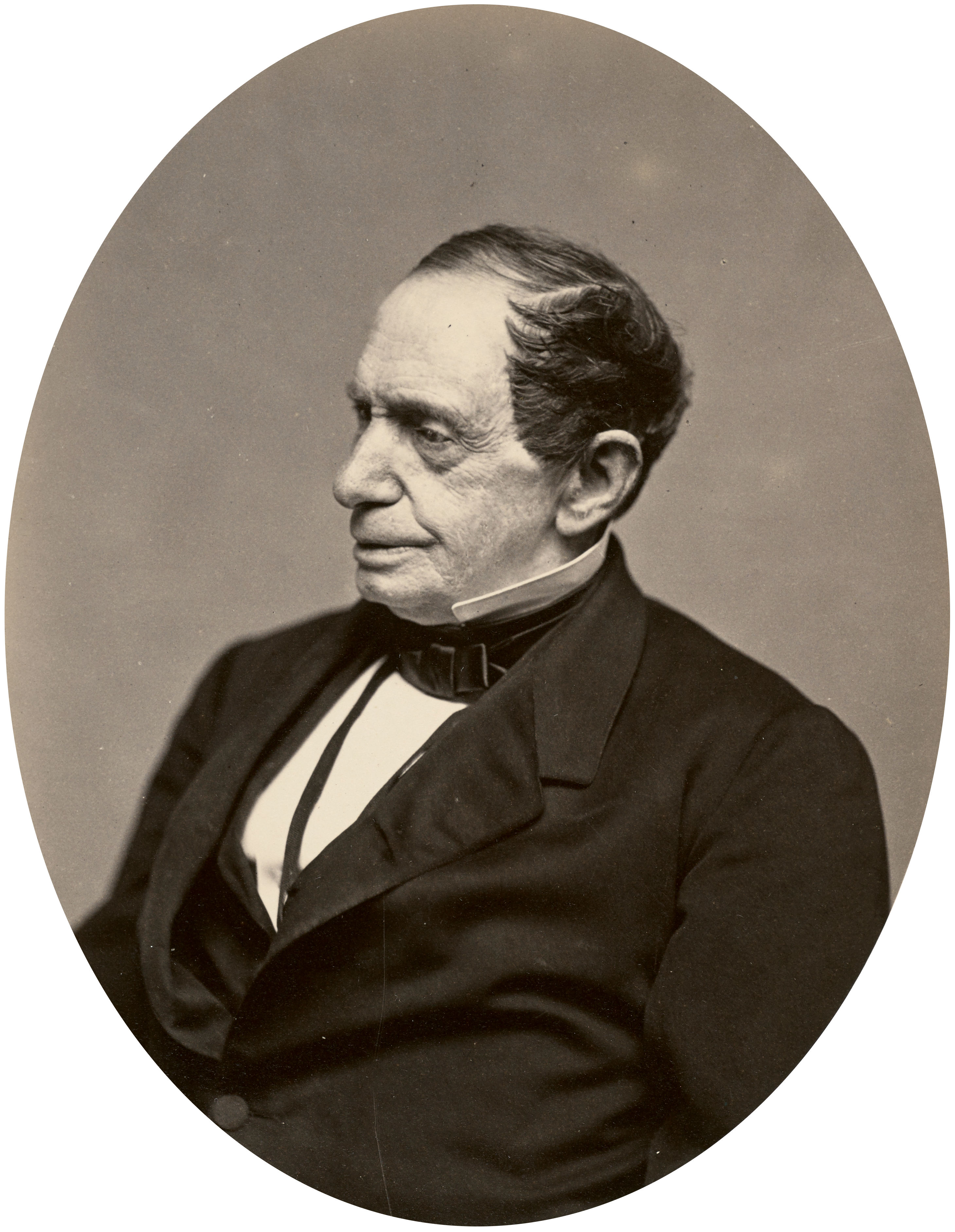
Johns Hopkins, the Baltimore merchant and banker whose philanthropic gift of over $7 million in 1889 launched the hospital

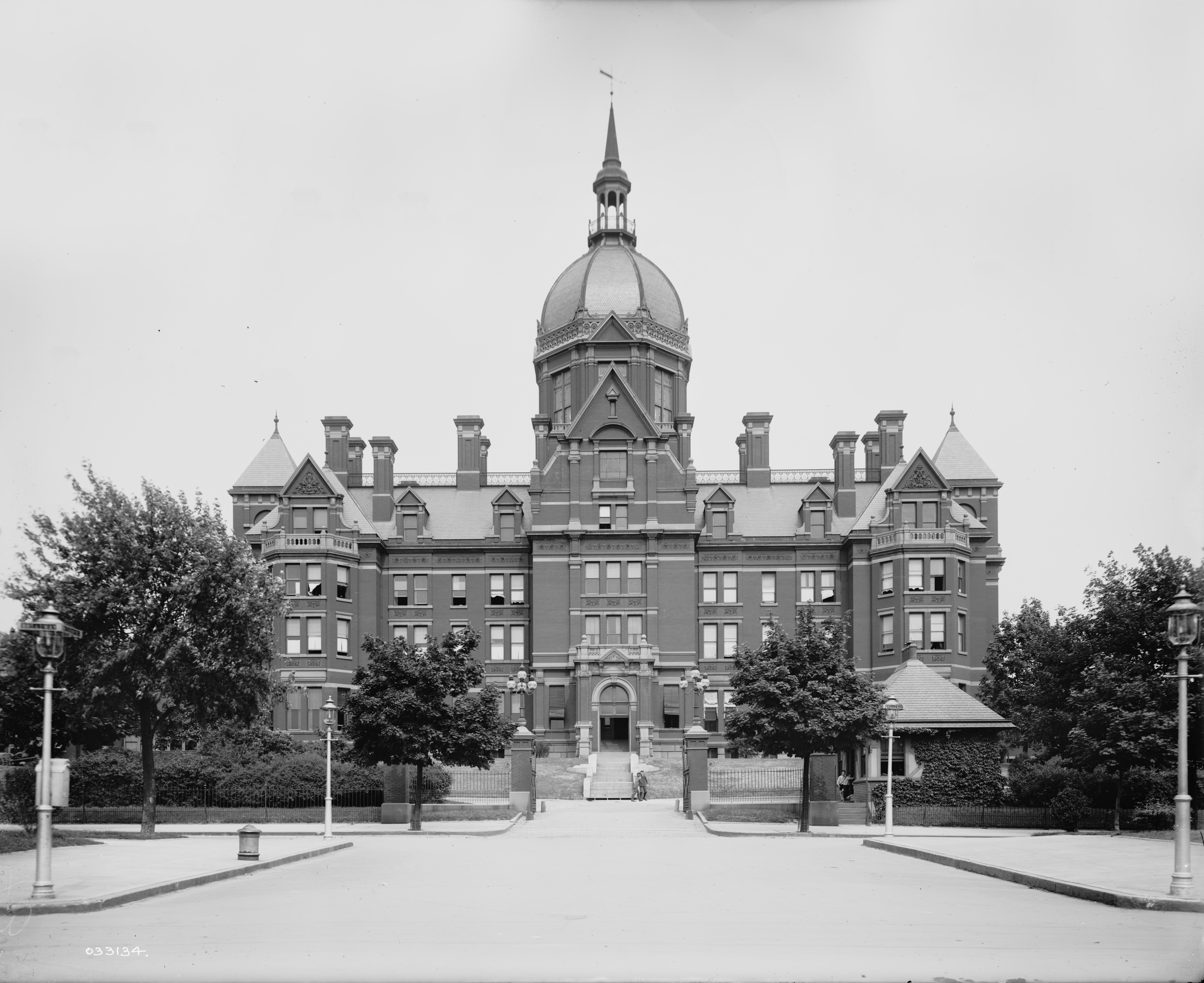
Johns Hopkins Hospital, c. 1890–1910

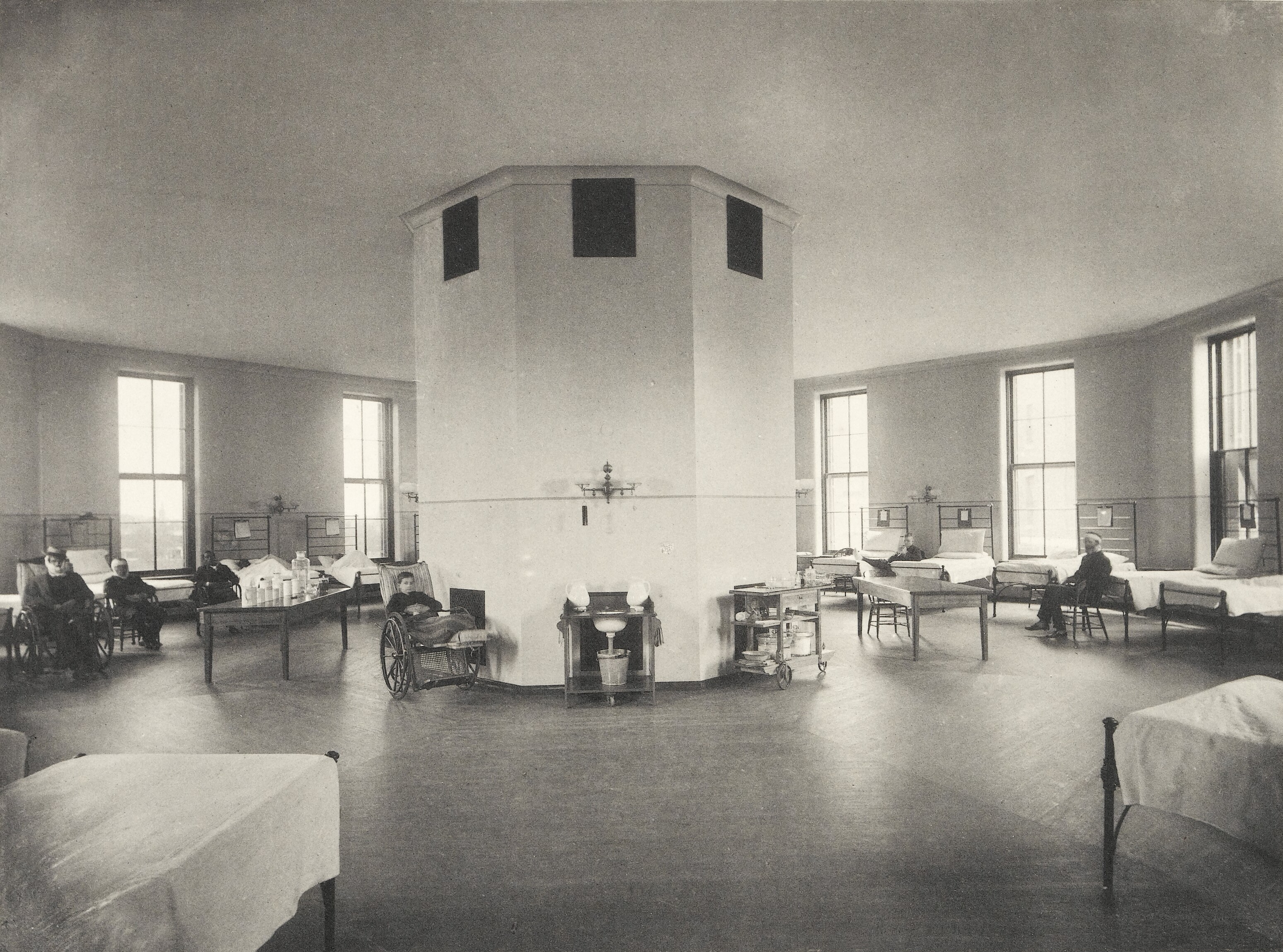
The interior of the Octagon Ward at Johns Hopkins Hospital

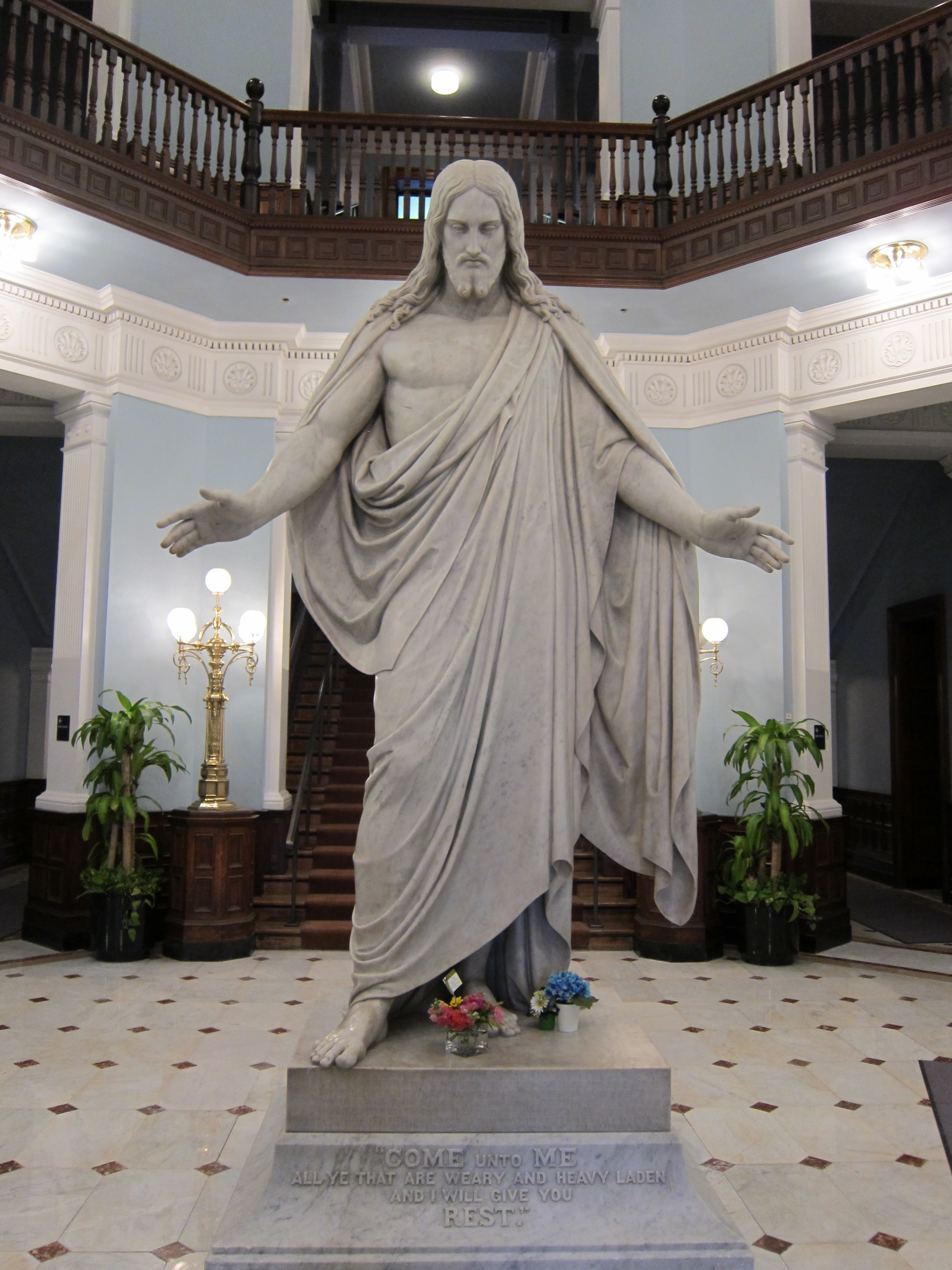
Christus, an 1833 Carrara marble statue in the hospital's rotunda of the resurrected Jesus, based on Bertel Thorvaldsen's original in 1833

=== Founding ===
Johns Hopkins (1795–1873), a Baltimore merchant and banker, left an estate of approximately $7 million (US$173.84 million in 2022) when he died on December 24, 1873, in his city mansion on West Saratoga Street, just west of North Charles Street, at the age of 78. In his will, he asked that his fortune be used to found three institutions that would bear his name: "Johns Hopkins University", "The Johns Hopkins Hospital", and "Johns Hopkins Colored Orphan Asylum." At the time that it was made, Hopkins' gift was the largest philanthropic bequest in the history of the nation.

Toward the end of his life, Hopkins selected 12 prominent Baltimore residents as trustees for the project. A year prior to his death, he sent each a letter telling them that he was giving "thirteen acres of land, situated in the city of Baltimore, and bounded by Broadway, Wolfe, Monument, and Jefferson streets upon which I desire you to erect a hospital." He wished for a hospital that "shall, in construction and arrangement, compare favorably with any other institution of like character in this country or in Europe" and directed his trustees to "secure for the service of the Hospital, physicians and surgeons of the highest character and greatest skill."

Hopkins instructed the trustees to "bear constantly in mind that it is my wish and purpose that the hospital shall ultimately form a part of the Medical School of that university for which I have made ample provision in my will." By calling for this integral relationship between patient care, as embodied in the hospital, and teaching and research, as embodied in the university, Hopkins laid the groundwork for a revolution in American medicine. Johns Hopkins' vision, of two institutions in which the practice of medicine would be wedded to medical research and medical education was revolutionary.

=== 19th century ===
Initial plans for the hospital were drafted by surgeon John Shaw Billings, and the architecture designed by John Rudolph Niernsee and completed by Edward Clarke Cabot of the Boston firm of Cabot and Chandler in a Queen Anne style. When completed in 1889 at a cost of $2,050,000 (US$50.8 million in 2022), the hospital included what was then state-of-the-art concepts in heating and ventilation to check the spread of disease.

The trustees obtained the services of four outstanding physicians, known as the "Big Four," to serve as the founding staff of the hospital when it opened on May 7, 1889. They were pathologist William Henry Welch, surgeon William Stewart Halsted, internist William Osler, and gynecologist Howard Atwood Kelly.

In 1893, Johns Hopkins University was one of the first medical schools to admit women. The decision to begin coeducation was a result of a shortage of funds, as the Baltimore and Ohio Railroad stock that was supposed to cover cost was used up in building the hospital in 1889 and the medical school had not yet been built. Four of the original trustees' daughters offered to raise the money needed to open the school, but only if the school agreed to admit qualified women to the university. After several discussions, the trustees agreed to their terms and accepted the financial help of these four women with only one of the doctors, William H. Welch, resisting. Eventually, even Welch changed his views on coeducation, "The necessity for coeducation in some form," he wrote later, "becomes more evident the higher the character of the education. In no form of education is this more evident than in that of medicine... we regard coeducation a success; those of us who were not enthusiastic at the beginning are now sympathetic and friendly."

Osler, the first chief of the Department of Medicine, is credited with originating the idea of a residency, in which recently graduated physicians receive advanced training in their specialty while treating patients under supervision; then, as now, residents comprise most of the medical staff of the hospital. He also introduced the idea of bringing medical students into actual patient care early in their training; at the time medical school consisted almost entirely of lectures. Osler's contribution to practical education extends to the creation of "grand rounds", the practice of leading physicians discussing the most difficult cases in front of assembled medical students, for the benefit of patients and students. The term "rounds" derives from the circular ward where bedside teaching occurred. He once said he hoped his tombstone would say only, "He brought medical students into the wards for bedside teaching."

Halsted, the first chief of the Department of Surgery, established many other medical and surgical achievements at Johns Hopkins including modern surgical principles of control of bleeding, accurate anatomical dissection, complete sterility, and the first radical mastectomy for breast cancer (before this time, such a diagnosis was a virtual death sentence). His other achievements included the introduction of the surgical glove and advances in thyroid, biliary tree, hernia, intestinal and arterial aneurysm surgeries. Halsted also established the first formal surgical residency training program in the United States.

Kelly is credited with establishing gynecology as a true medical specialty. He created new surgical approaches to women's diseases and invented numerous medical devices, including a urinary cystoscope. He was one of the first to use radium to treat cancer, with his first patient being his own aunt in 1904, who died shortly after surgery. Kelly was known to use excessive amounts of radium to treat various cancers and tumors. As a result, some of his patients died from radium exposure. His method of radium application was inserting a radium capsule near the affected area, then sewing the radium "points" directly to the tumor.

Welch was responsible for training many of the outstanding physicians of the day, such as Walter Reed. He also founded at Hopkins the nation's first Public Health school, now known as the Johns Hopkins Bloomberg School of Public Health.

A notable sight at the hospital is the marble statue Christus, a Carrara marble statue in the Billings Administration Building rotunda of the resurrected Jesus based on the 1833 original by Bertel Thorvaldsen, which was a gift by Baltimore merchant William Wallace Spence; it is a replica of the original by Danish sculptor Bertel Thorwaldsen in Copenhagen. Unveiled in 1896, the statue brings comfort to many, the hospital has said.

=== 20th century ===
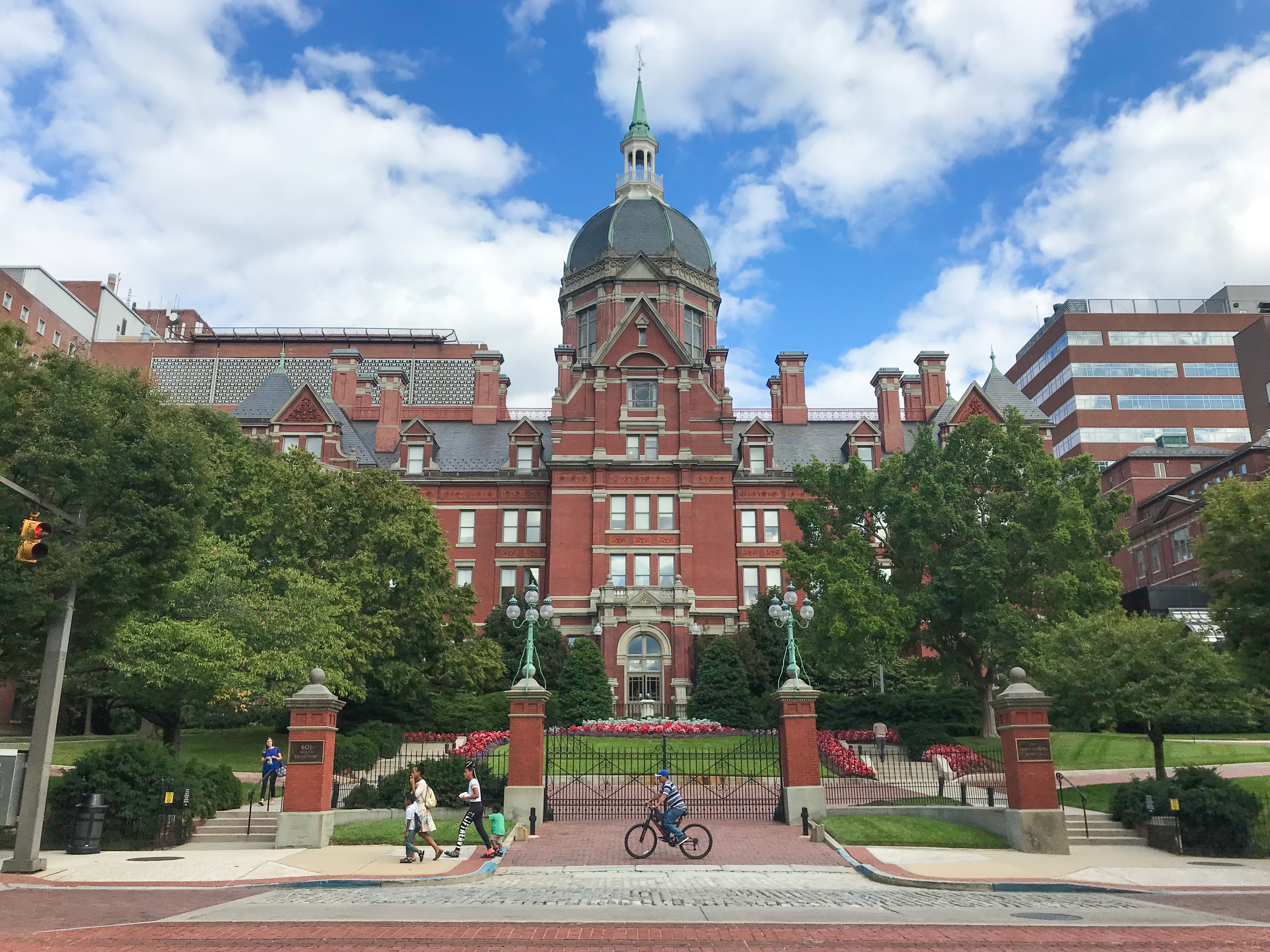
The Billings Building at the original hospital in 2019

In 1903, Harriet Lane left a sum of over $400,000 at her death in 1903 to establish the Harriet Lane Home for Invalid Children as a memorial to two sons who had died in childhood. In October 1912 the Harriet Lane Home officially opened. It was the first children's clinic in the United States that was associated with a medical school, first run by John Howland. Eventually treating over 60,000 children a year, the Harriet Lane Home became a pioneer treatment, teaching, and research clinic, and the first to have subspecialties in pediatrics as created by Edwards A. Park.

In 1912, Diamond Jim Brady donated $220,000 to the hospital, which created the James Buchanan Brady Urological Institute. Ophthalmologist William Holland Wilmer opened the Wilmer Eye Institute at the hospital in 1925, and its building was completed four years later. Wilmer received a medical degree from the University of Virginia School of Medicine in 1885 and later worked in New York City, Washington D.C., and Baltimore, where he established the institute.

Between 1930 and 1963, Helen B. Taussig, who helped to develop the blue baby operation, headed the pediatric cardiac clinic. Child psychiatrist Leo Kanner did studies of autistic children. Lawson Wilkins established an endocrine clinic that developed procedures used universally to treat children with certain glandular disorders, including dwarfism. John E. Bordley and William G. Hardy made strides in detecting hearing impairments in very young children.

== Achievements ==
Medical achievements at Johns Hopkins include the first male-to-female sex reassignment surgery in the United States that took place in 1966 at the Hopkins Gender Identity Clinic.

Two of the most far-reaching advances in medicine during the last 25 years were also made at Hopkins. First, the Nobel Prize-winning discovery of restriction enzymes gave birth to the genetic engineering industry. Second, the discovery of the brain's natural opiates has triggered an explosion of interest in neurotransmitter pathways and functions. Other accomplishments of the hospital include the development of HeLa by George Otto Gey, head of tissue culture research in 1951, the first and arguably most important line of human cells grown in culture, identification of the three types of polio virus, and the first "blue baby" operation, which was done by surgeon Alfred Blalock in collaboration with Helen Taussig, a Hopkins graduate specializing in pediatric cardiology and surgical technician Vivien Thomas that opened the way to modern cardiac surgery.

Contributions to heart surgery were brought on by the discovery of heparin and the Blalock-Thomas-Taussig Shunt. Johns Hopkins has also published The Harriet Lane Handbook, an indispensable tool for pediatricians, for over 60 years.

== Operations ==
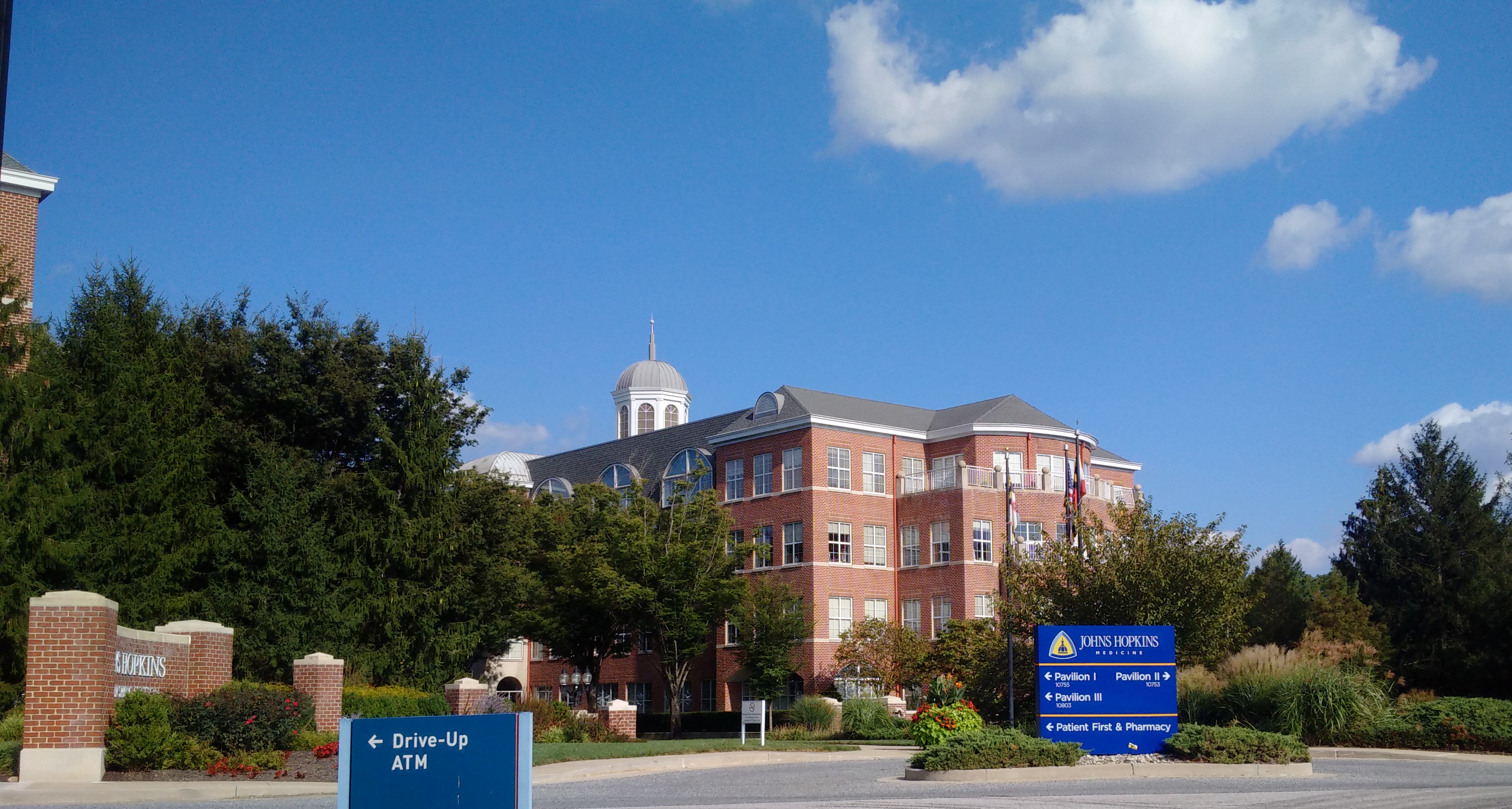
Johns Hopkins Medicine's campus in Brooklandville, Maryland

The hospital occupies approximately 20 of the 60 buildings on the Johns Hopkins Medical Campus. The complex has over 80 entrances and receives 80,000 visitors weekly. It houses over 1,000 beds and has a staff of over 1,700 doctors with over 30,000 total employees.

From 1982 to 1992, then CEO Robert Heyssel established the hospital's first Oncology Center, the Nelson Patient Tower, the Clayton Heart Center and the Johns Hopkins Outpatient Center which bears Heyssel's name. In May 2012, the Johns Hopkins Hospital opened two new towers as part of a major campus redevelopment effort. The opening of the new $1.1 billion Charlotte R. Bloomberg Children's Center tower and the new Sheikh Zayed Tower marked the highpoint of this effort. In addition to the main hospital, the system operates four other hospitals and several outpatient care facilities in the Baltimore and Washington metro areas and All Children's Hospital in St. Petersburg, Florida. In May, 2019, the hospital completed an $80 million expansion project at its Green Spring Station campus in Brooklandville, Maryland, offering out-patient surgery, imaging, and oncology treatment at the 3-story, 100,000-square-foot (9,300 m^{2}) Pavilion III.

Johns Hopkins also provides remote consultations worldwide through the Grand Round platform, and uses the same platform to help patients find the ideal specialist for their unique needs.

== Johns Hopkins Children's Center ==
Johns Hopkins Children's Center (JHCC) is a nationally ranked, pediatric acute care children's teaching hospital located in Baltimore, Maryland, adjacent to Johns Hopkins Hospital. The hospital has 196 pediatric beds and is affiliated with the Johns Hopkins School of Medicine. The hospital is the flagship pediatric member of Johns Hopkins Medicine and is 1 of 2 children's hospital in the network. The hospital provides comprehensive pediatric specialties and subspecialties to infants, children, teens, and young adults aged 0–21 throughout Baltimore and the wider United States. Johns Hopkins Children's Center also sometimes treats adults that require pediatric care.

Johns Hopkins Children's Center also features one of the only ACS verified Level 1 Pediatric Trauma Centers in the state. The hospital is directly attached to Johns Hopkins Hospital and is situated near the Ronald McDonald House of Maryland.

== Rankings ==
Johns Hopkins Hospital was ranked as the top overall hospital in the United States for 21 consecutive years by U.S. News & World Report until 2012, when it moved to second place behind Massachusetts General Hospital in Boston. In 2013, it was reinstated as the top hospital in the United States. In the 2016-2017 edition, Johns Hopkins ranks third-best nationally.

U.S. News & World Report – 2016–2017 rankings by medical specialty
U.S. national ranking	Maryland ranking	Specialty
3	1	Ear, nose, and throat
1	1	Radiology
4	1	Geriatrics
2	1	Neurology and neurosurgery
4	1	Urology
1	1	Rheumatology
4	1	Psychiatry
3	1	Ophthalmology
5	1	Gastroenterology and GI surgery
4	1	Diabetes and endocrinology
9	1	Cardiology & heart surgery
9	1	Oncology
7	1	Gynecology
13	1	Pulmonology
9	1	Orthopedics
5	1	Nephrology

== Ethical controversies and criticism ==
Johns Hopkins School of Medicine and Johns Hopkins Hospital (JHH) have faced criticism over ethics and research methodologies. JHH has established a pattern of targeting the working-class, poor, and marginalized in order to escape legal repercussions for unethical action.

=== STD research in Guatemala ===
From 1946 to 1948, Johns Hopkins researchers (notably Harry Eagle, Lowell Reed, and Thomas Turner) aided the United States government in a campaign of illegal experimentation in Guatemala in the pursuit of developing potential prophylactic measures against various sexually transmitted diseases (STDs). Without information or consent, over 5000 Guatemalan civilians were intentionally infected with bacteria causing STDs including syphilis, gonorrhea, and chancroid. This research program was a follow-up to a similar experiment conducted on prisoners in Terre Haute, Indiana, from 1943 to 1944. However, when researchers were unable to successfully infect the prisoners with a degree of regularity necessary for testing, the program was terminated and an effort was initiated to investigate the "natural method of infection" (i.e. sexual intercourse) in a less confined setting. Guatemala was chosen as the primary research site specifically to reduce concern for legal consequences and bad publicity. The study involved at least 5,128 vulnerable people, including children, orphans, child and adult prostitutes, Guatemalan Indians, leprosy patients, mental patients, prisoners, and soldiers.

=== Baltimore Lead Paint Study ===
Starting in 1993, researchers at the Johns Hopkins Kennedy Krieger Institute (KKI) attempted to develop less expensive lead-abatement methods to benefit Baltimore landlords of homes that contained lead-based paint. KKI sought to treat homes with these different methods and observe how much lead accumulated in young children when living in these homes, even actively finding new families to live in these apartments, bringing the total number of children evaluated to 140, and even offered incentives for doing so. Knowingly exposing families to toxic levels of lead, the researchers measured lead content of homes and took periodic blood tests over a two-year period. After the study ended, many poor, African-American children ended up with neurological disabilities as a result, often incurring permanent nervous damage.

=== Medical debt lawsuits ===
The Baltimore Sun reported in 2008 that JHH had filed approximately 14,000 debt collection lawsuits since 2003. A 2019 joint report from the AFL-CIO, National Nurses United (NNU), and community-advocacy group Coalition for a Humane Hopkins found that since 2009, Johns Hopkins Hospital (JHH) filed more than 2,400 lawsuits in Maryland courts seeking the repayment of alleged medical debt from former patients. The median amount sought in each lawsuit was $1,089 per patient (after costs covered by insurance, including Medicare and Medicaid), for which JHH engaged in tactics such as wage and property garnishment resulting in exacerbated hardship for patients often already suffering from financial instability and economic oppression (more than 40 cases involved patients filing for bankruptcy due to medical costs).

More concerning is that of the cases sampled in the NNU/AFL-CIO report (n=273), 86% of defendants were African-American, and all lived within three miles of JHH. The areas immediately surrounding JHH are economically distressed neighborhoods that experience poorer health outcomes than the rest of Baltimore City and the state of Maryland, indicating that JHH disproportionately preys on marginalized populations in its debt-collection crusades. The neighborhood with the most suits was the 21213 zip code, which has a 28.2% poverty rate and 36.5% child poverty rate (almost triple the state averages). In 2018, the debt repayment JHH sought (though not even necessarily granted) in court accounted for less than 0.05% of its operating revenue. Further, as a not-for-profit hospital, JHH receives tax subsidies and charity care provisions from the State of Maryland so that it may provide medical care at no or reduced cost to low-income or uninsured patients. However, JHH continually provides less in charity care than it receives in provisions - i.e. JHH has been fully reimbursed for its charity care costs by state funding nearly every year it has provided such care, continuing to sue patients for negligible medical debts while receiving millions of surplus dollars from public funding. The majority of patients pursued in court for medical debt repayment also qualify for charity care under Maryland state law, but such cost reductions were not made available.

JHH sues its own employees for medical debt more than those of any other employer, in many cases seeking repayments that exceed their Employee Health Program's annual out-of-pocket maximum ^{[a]}.

=== Death of Ellen Roche ===
In 2001, Ellen Roche, a 24-year old laboratory technician at the Johns Hopkins Bayview Medical Center's Asthma & Allergy Center, volunteered as part of a research study investigating bronchiolar reflexes during asthmatic reactions between asthmatic and non-asthmatic subjects. The study was already controversial, as it was specifically pursuing the theory that people with and without asthma both react similarly to inhaled irritants, but non-asthmatics are able to recover through deep breathing.

Ms. Roche was provided with details on possible side effects of the treatment, including wheezing, chest tightness, and transient dyspnoea. Death, however, was not presented as a possibility in the consent form. In the first phase of the experiment, involving four to five visits, participants were asked to inhale methacholine with and without taking deep breaths before inhalation. In the second phase, starting with the sixth visit, some of the participants, including Ms. Roche, were administered hexamethonium before inhaling methacholine and breathing deeply. Hexamethonium, however, is not approved by the Food and Drug Administration. Dr. Togias reported to the institutional review board, or I.R.B., an ethics group overseeing his work, that had concluded that the drug's main risk was in causing a temporary drop in blood pressure. A handful of cases of adverse pulmonary reactions to hexamethonium were reported in medical journals in the 1950s. These reactions included the development of bronchiolitis obliterans organising pneumonia (BOOP) and the acute respiratory distress syndrome (ARDS). Ms. Roche reportedly became ill—complaining of shortness of breath, dry cough, wheezing, and myalgias—within a day of entering the experiment. Laboratory tests showed a 35% reduction in lung function. Her course rapidly declined, with the development of the acute respiratory distress syndrome and renal failure. She died within a month of entering the experiment. The study was suspended.

Later that year, JHH stated that it accepted full responsibility for the recent death of a volunteer in an experiment. In a report on its investigation into the death, the university said the researcher who conducted the experiment and the ethics committee that approved it had failed to take adequate precautions to protect research subjects. Dean of JHH Edward B. Miller, however, also claimed "...we are unlikely ever to know precisely how or why this happened... Ellen sacrificed her life in an important study."

An external review report from Hopkins called the consent form "inadequate" and stated it referred to hexamethonium as a "medication" despite it having been unlicensed for medical use in the U.S. since 1972. The report also found "little evidence of rigorous pharmacological review" and inappropriate "safety and purity standards", yet still stated the death of Ellen Roche was "unavoidable".

=== Sex reassignment of David Reimer ===
In 1965, David Reimer and his twin brother Brian were both diagnosed with phimosis, and referred for circumcision at the age of seven months. General practitioner Jean-Marie Huot performed the operation using the unconventional method of electrocauterization, and the procedure burned David's penis beyond surgical repair. The doctors chose not to operate on Brian, and his phimosis resolved naturally. David's parents took him to see John Money at JHH in 1967, based on his reputation in the field of sexual development. Money believed that gender identity developed primarily as a result of social learning from early childhood and that it could be changed with the appropriate behavioral interventions.

Money and the Hopkins family team persuaded David's parents that sex reassignment surgery would be in his best interest. At the age of 22 months, David underwent a bilateral orchiectomy, in which his testes were surgically removed and a rudimentary vulva was constructed by genital plastic surgery. David was reassigned to be raised as female and given the name Brenda (similar to his birth name, "Bruce"). Psychological support for the reassignment and surgery was provided by John Money, who continued to see Reimer annually for consultations and to assess the outcome.

The sessions with Money included what Money called "childhood sexual rehearsal play". Money theorized that reproductive behaviour formed the foundation of gender, and that "play at thrusting movements and copulation" was a key aspect of gender development in all primates. Starting at age six, according to Brian, the twins were forced to act out sexual acts, with David playing the female role—Money made David get down on all fours, and Brian was forced to "come up behind [him] and place his crotch against [his] buttocks". Money also forced David, in another sexual position, to have his "legs spread" with Brian on top. On "at least one occasion" Money took a photograph of the two children doing these activities. Both David and Brian recall that Money was mild-mannered around their parents, but ill-tempered when alone with them. When they resisted inspecting each other's genitals, Money got very aggressive. These experiences severely traumatized both David and Brian.

Estrogen was given to David during adolescence, therefore inducing breast development. By the age of 13 years, Reimer was experiencing suicidal depression and he told his parents he would take his own life if they made him see Money again. Finally, on 14 March 1980, Reimer's parents told him the truth about his sex reassignment, following advice from Reimer's endocrinologist and psychiatrist. At the age of 14, having been informed of his past by his father, Reimer decided to assume a male gender identity, calling himself David. He underwent treatment to reverse the reassignment, including testosterone injections, a double mastectomy, and phalloplasty operations.

Contrary to Money's reports, when living as Brenda, Reimer did not identify as a girl. He was ostracized and bullied by peers (who dubbed him "cavewoman"), and neither frilly dresses nor female hormones made him feel female. In addition, Reimer was later chronically unemployed and experienced remorse due to the death of his brother Brian from an overdose of antidepressants on 1 July 2002. On 2 May 2004, his wife Jane told him she wanted to separate. On the morning of 4 May 2004, Reimer drove to a grocery store's parking lot in his hometown of Winnipeg and shot himself in the head. Money never commented publicly on Reimer's suicide, although colleagues said he was "mortified" by the case.

Money claimed the (false) success of Reimer's case as support for the optimum gender rearing model for intersex children. Researcher Mary Anne Case argues that Money's view on gender also fueled the rise of the anti-gender movement.

=== Closure of the Gender Identity Clinic ===
JHH opened the Gender Identity Clinic (GIC), the first gender-affirming surgery (GAS) clinic in the United States, in 1966. However, the clinic was closed and GAS was banned after a 1979 paper by Jon Meyer and Donna Reter claimed it "confers no objective advantage in terms of social rehabilitation", but "remains subjectively satisfying to those who have rigorously pursued a trial period and who have undergone it". Meyer wrote an editorial to the American Journal of Psychiatry in 1981 to explain his study and the subsequent ban, citing "uncertainty of long-term gains, the genesis and dynamics of transsexualism, the performance of surgery of this magnitude for less than clear cut psychiatric indicators, and the allocation of surgical resources after 13 years devoted to transsexual surgery" as concerns precipitating the Clinic's closure. The paper, however, utilized samples from as early as the 1960s, while plastic surgical capabilities, and thus rates of satisfaction, had increased rapidly in the 1970s.

In 2022, however, Johns Hopkins medical student Walker Magrath published an article that reviewed archival documentation from the Johns Hopkins and Harvard Medical School libraries. Magrath's article details the evolving attitude of plastic surgeon John Hoops, inaugural director of the GIC. While Hoops expressed optimism for GAS in 1966, by 1974 he had begun referring to GAS as "a facade" and to transgender patients as ""psychopath", "masochist", "hysterical", "freakish", and "artificial". Further, 1975 marked the appointment of Paul McHugh as Chief of Psychiatry at JHH. While McHugh is notorious for his transphobic views and pathologizing of gender and sexual minorities as mentally ill, his was not a dissenting voice at the GIC by the time of his appointment. Magrath quotes Hoops requesting from Meyer a "strongly worded paper outlining our reasons for no longer participating in... the performance of transsexual surgery" as early as 1978, going so far as to say it would be a welcome submission to the Journal of Plastic and Reconstructive Surgery for which Hoops was an editor.

In 1974, Hoops ordered the GIC to be relocated to the JHH Woman's Clinic, which was already underfunded, overcrowded, and slated for demolition. This significantly constrained the capabilities of the GIC, limiting the number of patients it was able to maintain and the services it was able to offer in its final years. Magrath places the movement to end GAS within the context of rapid advancement in plastic surgery over the 1960s and 70s, wherein Hoops utilized the publicity from GAS to promote plastic surgery as a field, but felt pressured to sweep what he later saw as less-than-ideal surgical results of GAS under the rug so as not to detract from the overall public progress of plastic surgery in general. This history runs contrary to the public claims from JHH that the closure of the GIC was "evidence-based".

== Notable patients ==
=== Deaths ===
- William W. Beck, Maryland State Senator (April 5, 1923)
- Charles B. Bosley, Maryland State Delegate (January 22, 1959)
- Tom Clancy, novelist (October 1, 2013)
- John D. C. Duncan Jr., Maryland State Senator and State Delegate (August 13, 1958)
- Evelyn Glick, golfer (October 14, 1998)
- Alexander Haig, U.S. Secretary of State (February 20, 2010)
- Thomas J. Hatem, Maryland State Delegate (March 19, 1985)
- Donald Henderson, physician and director of the Global Smallpox Eradication Program (August 19, 2016)
- John F. Joesting, Maryland State Delegate (April 17, 1978)
- Therese Bishagara Kagoyire, Rwandan Senator (July 8, 2019)
- Robert R. Lawder, Maryland State Senator and Havre de Grace, Maryland mayor (September 3, 1967)
- Walter Lively, civil rights activist (September 10, 1976)
- Hooper S. Miles, Maryland State Treasurer and State Delegate (March 8, 1964)
- Art Modell, owner, Baltimore Ravens and Cleveland Browns (September 6, 2012)
- Ogden Nash, poet (May 19, 1971)
- Edward J. Pearson, railroad executive (December 7, 1928)
- Virachai Plasai, Thailand's ambassador to the United States (March 16, 2019)
- L. Welch Pogue, Civil Aeronautics Board chairman (May 10, 2003)
- Paul Ts'o, Hong Kong biophysical chemist (December 2, 2009)

=== Hospitalizations ===
- Chaudhary Charan Singh, former prime minister of India (1986)
- Paul Armstrong, former playwright (1915)
- Al Capone, former organized crime figure (1939)
- Elizabeth Coffey, actress and transgender activist (1972)
- Omar D. Crothers Jr., former Maryland State Senator (1953)
- Larry Doby, former professional baseball player, Chicago White Sox and Cleveland Indians (1959)
- Jim Duquette, former general manager, New York Mets (2012)
- Zelda Fitzgerald, former novelist, socialite, and wife of F. Scott Fitzgerald (1932)
- Lynden Pindling, first Prime Minister of the Bahamas (1996)
- John Reed, former journalist and author (1916)
- Ida Tarbell, former writer (1917)
- L. Frederick Wade, Progressive Labour Party leader in Bermuda (1996)
- Taylor Winnett, para swimmer in 2024 Summer Paralympics (2016)
- Henrietta Lacks, African-American woman whose cancer cells are the source of the HeLa cell line (1951)

== See also ==
- Hopkins television series
- Johns Hopkins All Children's Hospital
- Johns Hopkins School of Medicine
- Johns Hopkins University
- Medical centers in the United States

== Notes ==
[a] - See www.ehp.org/our-health-plans/johns-hopkins-university-2/. There are numerous plans covering university and hospital employees, with different annual out-of-pocket maximums, depending on income, and whether the plan is individual or family coverage. Johns Hopkins University employees currently have a $2,000 annual out-of-pocket maximum for individual coverage. JHH employees have a $1,500 annual out-of-pocket maximum if they earn less than $50,000.
