= Snow Storm: Hannibal and his Army Crossing the Alps =

Painting by J. M. W. Turner

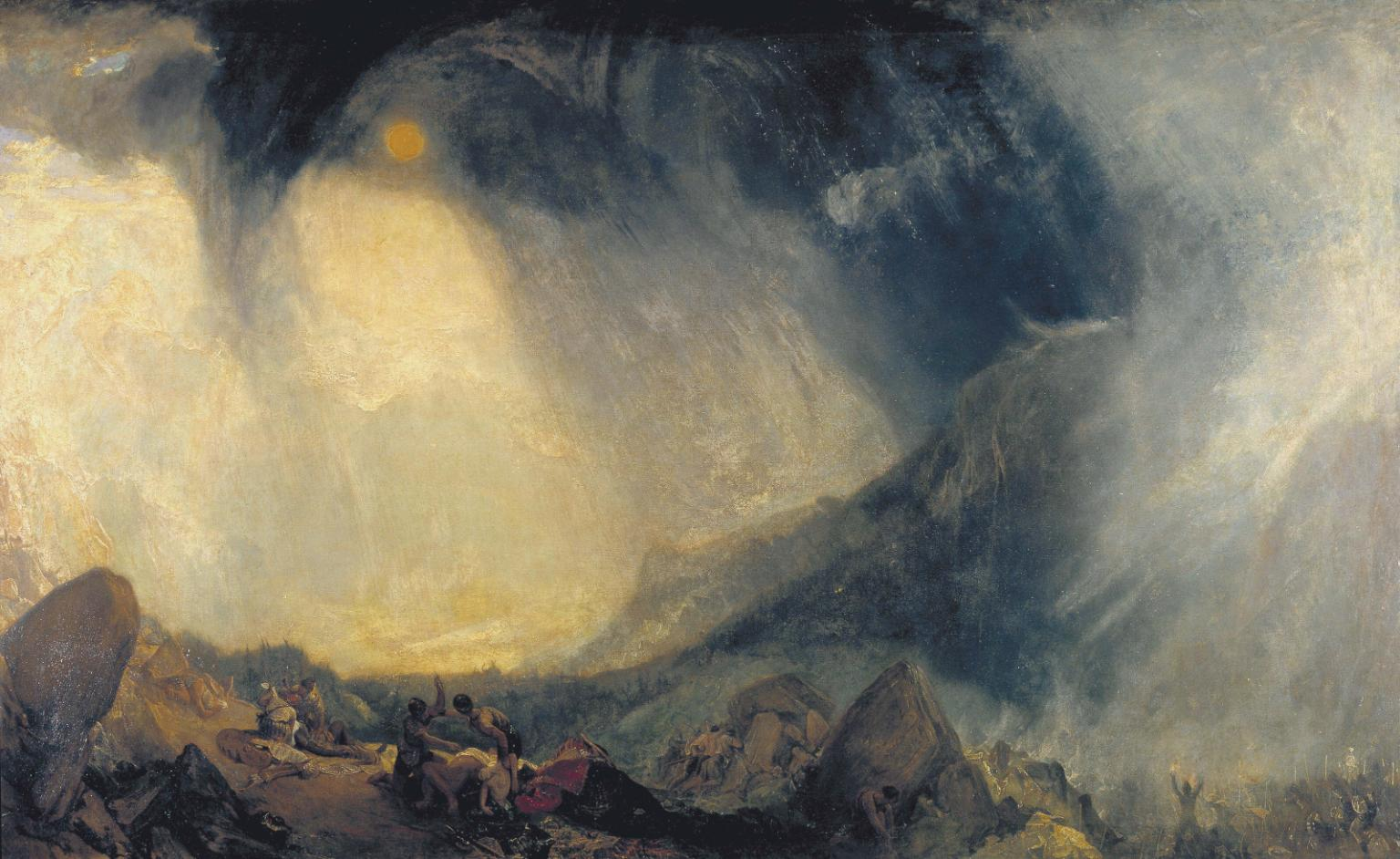
- Artist: J. M. W. Turner
- Year: 1812
- Medium: Oil on canvas
- Dimensions: 146 cm × 237.5 cm (57.5 in × 93.5 in)
- Location: Tate Britain, London
- Accession: N00490
- Website: www.tate.org.uk/...n00490

Snow Storm: Hannibal and his Army Crossing the Alps is an 1812 oil on canvas landscape painting by the English artist J. M. W. Turner. The painting depicts a black storm, a snow avalanche and an attacking Alpine tribe threatening Hannibal's army during his crossing of the Alps in 218 BC, at the start of the Second Punic War. Accounts of the expedition, written by ancient historians Polybius and Livy, recounted that these difficulties were surmounted by Hannibal during the crossing.

The work constitutes a pivotal moment in Turner's aim to demonstrate that principles of the sublime aesthetic ideal – proposed by Edmund Burke in the 18th century – could be achieved not only in poetry, but also in painting. Snow Storm's composition is notable due to its radical departure from classical traditions, as it uses a vortex and swirling arcs instead of linear perspective.

Snow Storm was also important in Turner's persistent efforts to elevate the status of landscape paintings in the long-established hierarchy of genres.

The painting was first exhibited at the Royal Academy of Arts's annual Summer Exhibition in 1812. While contemporary critical opinions were divided, it is now considered one of Turner's most influential works. The painting was donated to the nation in 1856 as part of the Turner Bequest and is now exhibited in the Tate Britain museum in London.

== Historical Background ==
=== Second Punic War ===
The crossing of the Alps was an epic military manoeuver by the Carthaginian general Hannibal during the Second Punic War (218–201 BC), fought between Carthage and the Roman Republic. According to accounts of the ancient classical historians Polybius and Livy, the crossing faced numerous obstacles, including attacks by Transalpine Gallic tribes, cold weather, and avalanches, all of which are depicted in the painting.

This historical event had intrigued Turner since the start of his career. Around 1800, 14 years before he painted Snow Storm, he made a sketch of a watercolour by J. R. Cozens, titled A Landscape with Hannibal in His March Over the Alps, Showing to His Army the Fertile Plains of Italy (now lost). At the time, Turner said that it was a work "from which he learned more than anything he had then seen."

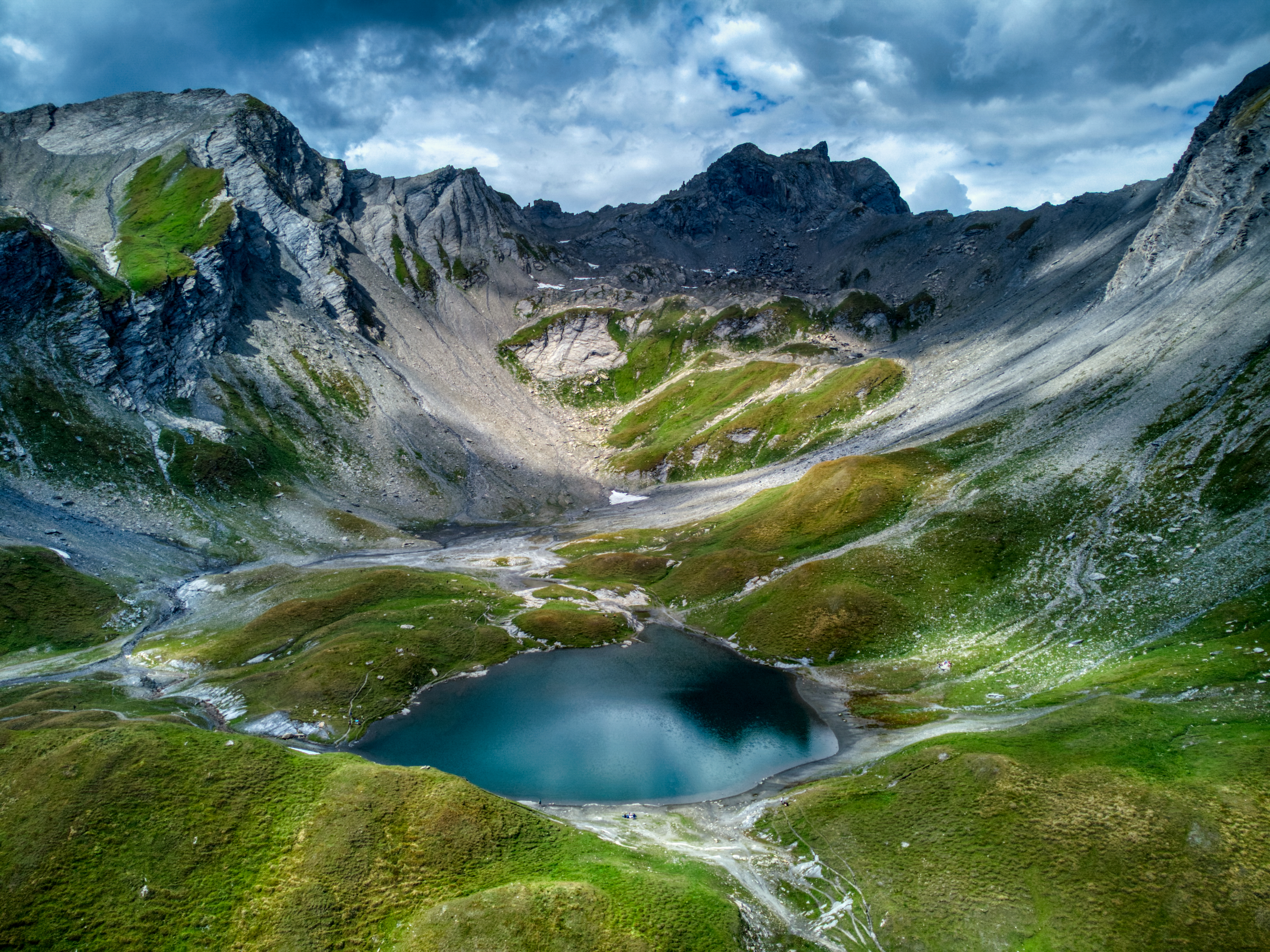
Little Saint Bernard Pass in the Alps on the France–Italy border.

To enhance the dramatic effect of the painting, Turner took some artistic liberties. In the painting, the Aosta Valley is shown in the far distance, which corresponds to the view during a descent from the Little Saint Bernard Pass. However, Livy wrote that the attacks occurred during the army's ascent and that it found no resistance during the descent into the Aosta Valley. Also, in an accompanying poem composed by Turner and included in the exhibition catalogue, the attackers are identified as the Salassian tribe. According to Polybius, Hannibal's army was ambushed by the Gallic Allobroge tribe, on what is now the French side of the Alps. (Note: Polybius obtained this information by interviewing Carthaginians who survived the march.)

=== Napoleonic Wars ===
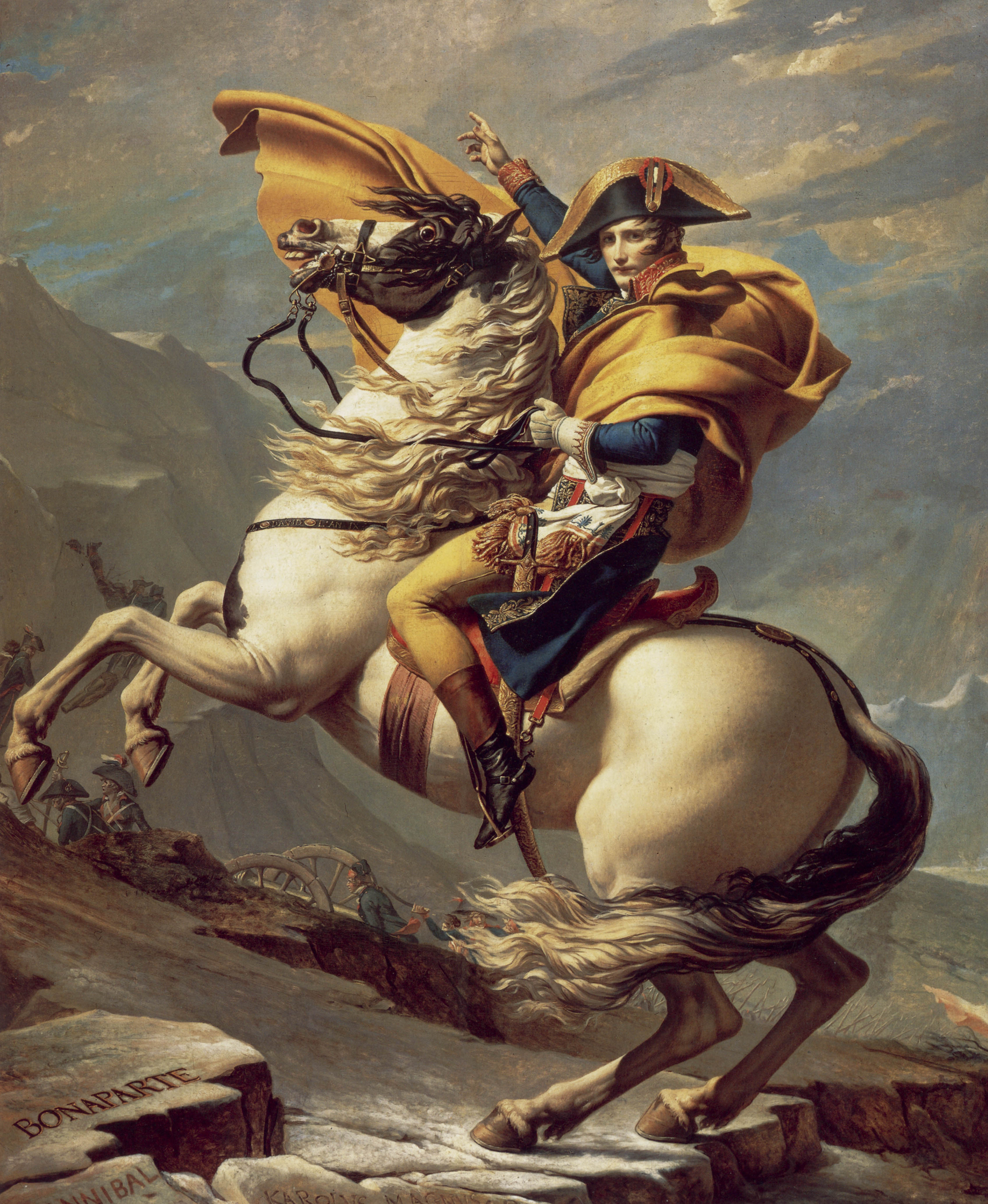
Napoleon Crossing the Alps by Jacques-Louis David (1801), Louvre Museum

Turner painted Snow Storm during the Napoleonic Wars (1803–1815), a series of conflicts between the French Empire, led by Napoleon, and European coalitions that included Britain. In 1802, Turner visited Paris and viewed Jacques-Louis David's recently painted Napoleon Crossing the Alps (1801), a work commissioned to serve the cult of personality of Bonaparte. By inscribing his name on a rock alongside Hannibal and Charlemagne, David's painting associated Bonaparte with great military leaders of ancient history who had crossed the Alps during military campaigns.

Rather than celebrating a heroic commander on horseback – as David did in his painting – Turner emphasized natural forces, reducing the legendary general Hannibal into a minute figure riding an elephant. This compositional choice served Turner's broader goal of elevating the status of landscape painting, proving it capable of conveying intense narrative and historical drama. Given that Britain was involved in the Napoleonic Wars and Napoleon had also crossed the Alps, the painting could also be interpreted as a projection of the artist's desire for the eventual defeat of Napoleon.

Identifying Napoleon and France with Hannibal and Carthage was unusual. As a land power with a relatively weak navy, France was more usually identified with Rome, and the naval power of Britain drew parallels with Carthage. A more typical symbolism, linking the modern naval power of Britain with the ancient naval power of Carthage, can be detected in Turner's later works, Dido Building Carthage, and The Decline of the Carthaginian Empire.

== Description ==
The composition uses a low vantage point, placing the viewer behind a group of broken rocks in the immediate foreground. Above, an orange-yellow sun is positioned behind the dark, swirling clouds. In the distance, Hannibal is gesturing with his arm while riding an elephant, while attackers and looters assail his rear-guard. His army is threatened by a snow avalanche as well as by the "menacing mass of an encroaching storm [that] engulfs the sky like the encircling wings of a bird of prey about to strike". Combined, these elements create a dramatic narrative of the challenges Hannibal faced during his crossing.

== Composition ==
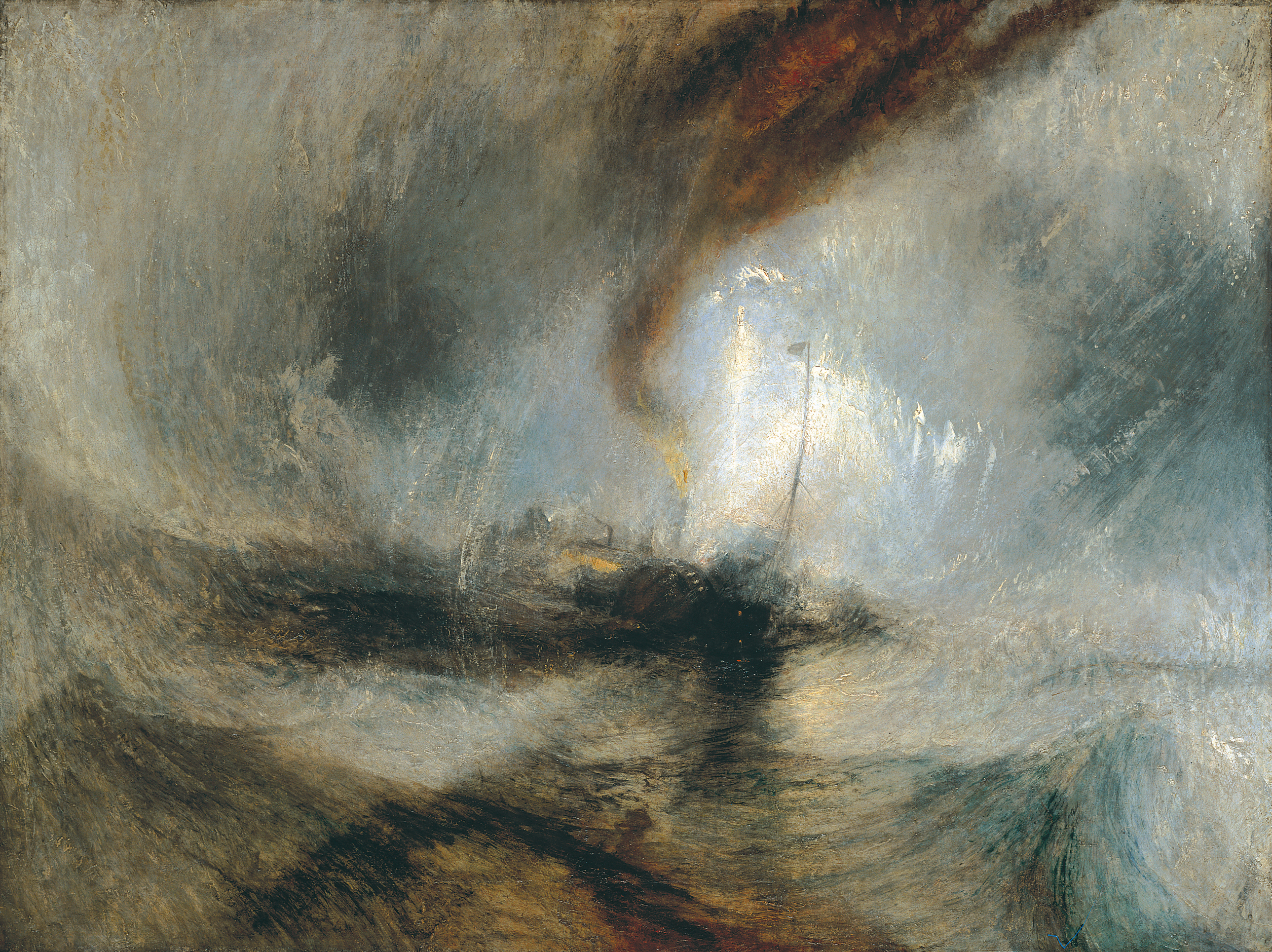
Snow Storm: Steam-Boat off a Harbour's Mouth (1842), Tate Britain

Turner traveled across Europe and sketched incessantly, using these sketches even decades later as inspiration for his paintings. During a trip in 1802, he recorded visual studies of the Alpine mountains of Switzerland, which were used as a reference for those depicted in this painting.

Snow Storm's composition is based on a central vortex and irregular, intersecting arcs, instead of the traditional horizontal, vertical or diagonal lines of classical compositions. The art historian John Walker describes it as an "extraordinary innovation", as "the vortex of cloud and mist seems to suck the eye into vast distances." Turner would reuse the vortex and intersecting arcs compositional structure in later paintings such as Snow Storm: Steam-Boat off a Harbour's Mouth, painted in 1842.

The Yorkshire storm In 1810, while staying at his friend Walter Fawkes's family estate in Yorkshire, he was mesmerized by a storm, which he frantically sketched in the back of an envelope. This sketch served as the basis for the dark storm depicted in Snow Storm. In his diary, Fawkes's son Hawksworth years later documented what Turner said to him that day:

“Hawkey! Hawkey! Come here! Come here! Look at this thunder-storm. Isn’t it grand? – Isn’t it wonderful? – Isn’t it sublime?” All this time he was making notes of its form and colour on the back of a letter. I proposed some better drawing-block, but he said it did very well. He was absorbed – he was entranced. There was the storm rolling and sweeping and shafting out its lightning over the Yorkshire hills. Presently the storm passed, and he finished. “There! Hawkey,” said he. “In two years you will see this again, and call it ‘Hannibal Crossing the Alps.”

== Analysis ==
=== Symbolism ===
To explain the complex set of ideas he wanted to convey with the painting, Turner inserted an extract of an original poem called "Fallacies of Hope" (Note: According to Shanes, the poem only appears to have existed in fragments in the Royal Academy catalogues.) into the exhibition catalogue. According to Moorby, its "convoluted language and abstruse references" make it hard to decode, but it demonstrates that Turner had "a profoundly literary sensibility," adding that "given the scarcity of other written memoranda from him [...], it is worth paying attention to his poetry." (Note: Moorby comments in jest that its "dense and rather affected verse [fills] the average twenty-first-century reader with a kind of dull horror.")

The poem reveals several layers of meaning and the interplay among the elements in the painting.

Fallacies of Hope by J.M.W Turner (extract)

Craft, treachery, and fraud – Salassian force,
Hung on the fainting rear! then Plunder seiz'd
The victor and the captive, – Saguntum's spoil,
Alike, became their prey; still the chief advanc'd,
Look'd on the sun with hope; – low, broad, and wan;
While the fierce archer of the downward year
Stains Italy's blanch'd barrier with storms.
In vain each pass, ensanguin'd deep with dead,
Or rocky fragments, wide destruction roll'd.
Still on Campania's fertile plains – he thought,
But the loud breeze sob'd, "Capua's joys beware!"

— J. M. W. Turner, Royal Academy Exhibition catalogue (1812)

In their analyses, Shanes and Moorby identify the following metaphors and moral lessons:

- "The victor and the captive" underscores a bleak moral equivalence. The Carthaginian army had just plundered the city of Saguntum ("Saguntum's spoil") in the Iberian peninsula, and is now itself being attacked and plundered from the rear by an Alpine tribe. Turner uses this to highlight the cyclical nature of warfare.
- The "downward year" refers to the autumn equinox, when the days become progressively shorter, darker, and colder as the year "slopes" toward the winter solstice. Astrologically, the sun enters the sign of Sagittarius (the "fierce archer") in November. According to ancient historical sources, Hannibal made the pass around that month.
- The line describing how the archer "stains Italy's blanch'd barrier with storms" refers to the winter storms falling on the mountain range, as if nature itself is turning against Hannibal during his Alpine crossing.
- Finally, the line "Capua's joys beware!" refers to a moral lesson, called the "Capuan Luxury". After crossing the Alps, Hannibal decided to rest his army during the winter in the rich and temperate city of Capua, located in the southern Italian region of Campania. This decision became a metaphor to succumbing to the temptation to relax after overcoming a great ordeal, which led to a softening of character and eventual ruin.

==== The Capuan Luxury trap ====
During Turner's time, ancient histories were studied in British schools not only for the facts but also to extract moral lessons from history. The centuries-old "Capuan Luxury" admonition (otia Capuae in Latin)

In History of Rome, Livy wrote:

[Hannibal] settled in Capua as his winter quarters. There he kept his army under shelter for the greater part of the winter. A long and varied experience had inured that army to every form of human suffering, but it had not been habituated to or had any experience of ease and comfort.

So it came about that the men whom no pressure of calamity had been able to subdue fell victims to a prosperity too great and pleasures too attractive for them to withstand, and fell all the more utterly the more greedily they plunged into new and untried delights. Sloth, wine, feasting, women, baths, and idle lounging, which became every day more seductive as they became more habituated to them, so enervated their minds and bodies that they were saved more by the memory of past victories than by any fighting strength they possessed now.

Authorities in military matters have regarded the wintering at Capua as a greater mistake on the part of Hannibal than his not marching straight to Rome after his victory at Cannae. For his delay at that time might be looked upon as only postponing his final victory but this may be considered as having deprived him of the strength to win victory.

=== Aesthetics ===
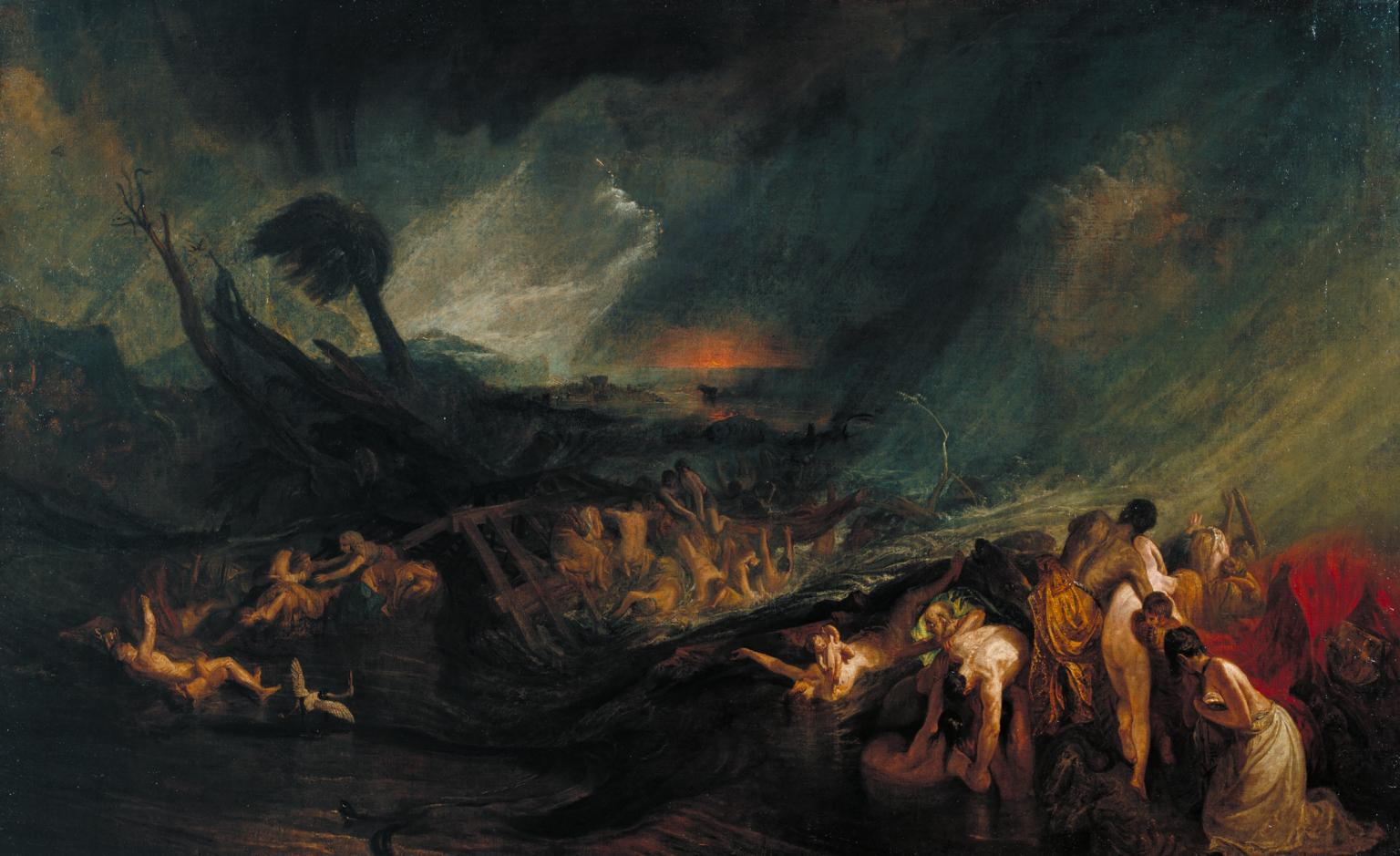
The Deluge, J.M.W Turner (1805). Tate Britain.

In Snow Storm we can clearly see two guiding principles of Turner's artistic production throughout his life: the pursuit of the sublime in painting and his efforts to elevate the status of landscape painting.

Turner based the painting on the aesthetic concept of the sublime, postulated by Edmund Burke in the mid-18th century, which "celebrated the disorder and wildness present within the natural world, and the corresponding emotional impact upon the individual." This idea inspired Turner throughout his life, as he believed that the pictorial medium could rival the affective powers of poetry. The Deluge (1805), a biblical landscape painting that preceded Snow Storm, also shows a crowd of people powerless against a dark, raging storm, with the intent to generate intense feelings of "intense vulnerability triggered by perilious environments".

Under the rigid hierarchy of genres established by the French Académie royale de peinture et de sculpture ("Royal Academy of Painting and Sculpture") in the 18th century – also used by Britain's Royal Academy of Arts – landscape painting was considered several levels below historical paintings.

Turner's career was defined by the objective of elevating the status of landscape painting within the hierarchy of genres, in which it was considered of a lesser value than historical paintings and portraits in the artistic academic establishment. In this, as an in other paintings, he did this by "the creation of chains of ideas by means of visual linkage, metaphor [and] simile." In the case of Snow Storm, they included a moral lesson (the Capuan Luxury trap) and historical parallels (Hannibal and Napoleon). Instead of openly defying the hierarchy of genres, Turner systematically subverted it with a campaign that lasted several years. Snow Storm was a major milestone for his purposes, as it showed that a major historical event and philosophical ideas could both be depicted in a landscape painting.

== Materials and technique ==
A technical analysis conducted by Townsend revealed that Turner used a palette that included newly developed industrial pigments. To depict the sun, Turner employed chrome yellow. (Note: The industrial chemist George Field started manufacturing the chrome yellow artist pigment around 1814–1816 and distributed prototype samples to some painters, including Turner.) He blended it with traditional ochre and Naples yellow.

The dark storm clouds were painted with cobalt blue, which had been introduced to the art market in 1807. He combined it with ground cobalt glass and ivory black (bone char). Turner used Vermilion and other light red pigments sparingly to colour the garments of the ambushing tribe and the bloodied path.

To enhance the visual effect of the dark vortex and the white avalanche, he used a thick impasto technique, characterized by heavy brushwork and the use of a palette knife.

== Critical reception ==
At the time, critics were very divided on their opinions of Snow Storm. Among the positive reviews, one art critic qualified it as "magical", famously calling Turner "[the] Prospero of the graphic arts, adding that "[Turner] can give to airy nothing a substantial form." The American painter Washington Allston said that the painting demonstrated that Turner was “the greatest painter since the days of Claude”. The Victorian art critic John Ruskin, who championed Turner's mastery of landscape painting, considered this painting the first in art history to accurately capture the true emotional expression of mountain landscapes.

Snow Storm and subsequent paintings that were more abstract than Turner's earlier paintings, were considered by some critics as "unfinished" works and they even generated rude comments, with some critics comparing them to lobster salad, mustard and soap suds. Like many others, modern art historians Shanes and Wilton consider Snow Storm a pivotal work in Turner's career, as it played an important role in raising the status of historical landscape painting, thus challenging the hierarchy of genre, and because it contributed to establish the aesthetic of the sublime in painting.

== Influence ==
Snow Storm represented an important break from traditional perspective composition and precise pictorial representation. Its powerful expressionistic and abstract representation influenced early impressionist artists like Camille Pissarro and Claude Monet, both of whom saw Turner's work while visiting London in 1870. "It seems to me that we are all descended from the Englishman Turner," wrote Pissarro years later. ‘He was perhaps the first painter who knew how to make colours blaze out with their natural brilliance."

Tate Britain includes this work in the list of Turner's paintings that had the most impact on later European art.

== Provenance ==
The painting was donated to the nation in 1856 as part of the Turner Bequest, which went initially to the National Gallery, London, but it was one of the majority of the works transferred to Tate Britain when this was established.

== See also ==
- List of paintings by J. M. W. Turner

== General references ==
- Moorby, Nicola. Turner and Constable: Art, Life, and Landscape. Yale University Press, 2025. ISBN 978-0300275810.
- Moyle, Franny. Turner: The Extraordinary Life and Momentous Times of J.M.W. Turner. London: Viking, 2016.
- Shanes, Eric. Turner: The Life and Masterworks. Rev. and updated 3rd ed. New York: Parkstone Press, 2004. ISBN 978-1-85995-905-3.
- Walker, John. Joseph Mallord William Turner. Concise ed. New York: Harry N. Abrams, Incorporated, 1983. ISBN 978-0-8109-1679-1.
- Wilton, Andrew. Turner in His Time. London: Thames and Hudson, 1987. ISBN 978-0500190456.
