= Tommy Turner =

Tommy Turner may refer to:

- Tommy Turner (athlete) (born 1947), American former sprinter
- T. J. Turner (end) (Tommy James Turner, 1963–2009), American football player
- Tommy Turner (politician) (born 1952), American politician
- Tommy Turner (footballer) (born 1963), Scottish footballer

== See also ==
- Thomas Turner (disambiguation)
