= Turner Bequest =

Collection of artwork by J.M.W. Turner

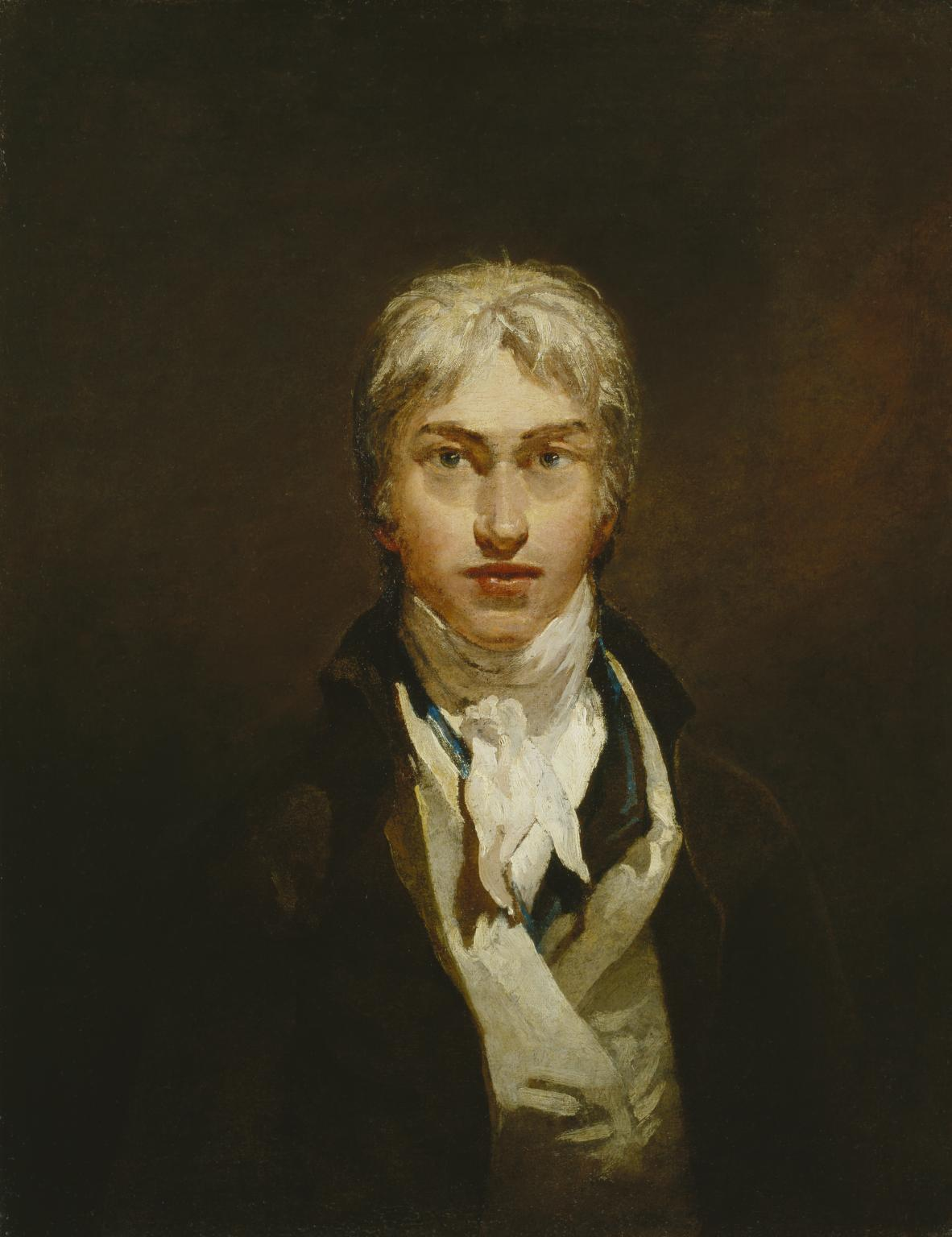
Turner's Self-Portrait of 1799 formed part of the Bequest

The Turner Bequest was a large bequest by the British artist Joseph Mallord William Turner. It came into effect on Turner's death in December 1851 with the artist leaving all his artistic legacy still in his possession, including oil paintings, watercolours and sketches, to the nation.

Elected at the age of twenty seven to full membership Royal Academy of Arts in 1802, Turner was a strong supporter of both the Academy and the promotion of British art in general. While many of his works had been sold throughout his profitable career, Turner kept a large number of them in his own possession sometimes even buying them back from owners. Turner rejected a major offer for one of them to be placed on the newly-created National Gallery only to later gift it as part of the Bequest.

Turner died wealthy and left various sums to his family and others as well as creating Turner's Gift, a fund to support artists who had fallen on hard times. The paintings he donated to the nation included about 100 finished oil paintings as well as 200 unfinished ones as well as countless watercolours and drawings.

The Bequest prompted a legal challenge launched by various cousins including Thomas Price Turner, who initially tried to claim unsuccessfully that Turner was of unsound mind when he made his Will. They continued to contest their exclusions from the will. The delays mean that it wasn't until 19 March 1856 that the Court of Chancery approved a settlement that the claimants had reached with the executors. The major victim of the settlement was the loss of Turner's Gift for distressed artists.

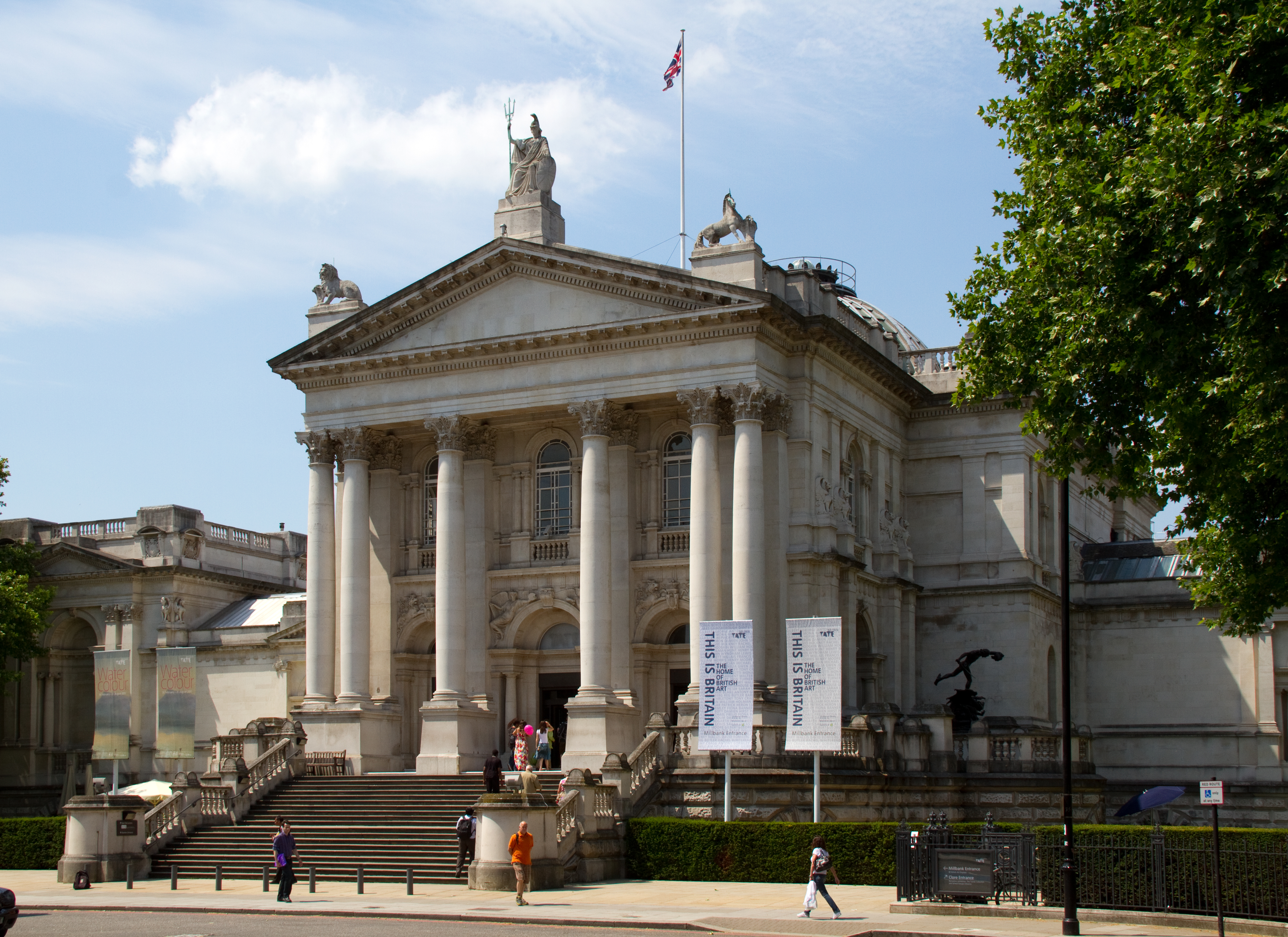
The Tate Britain now houses much of the Turner Bequest

Today the bulk of the Turner Bequest is in the collection of the Tate Britain in Pimlico, while a selection of paintings such as The Fighting Temeraire and The Great Western Railway are on display at the National Gallery. The Tate therefore houses the world's largest collection of works by Turner.

== Gallery ==
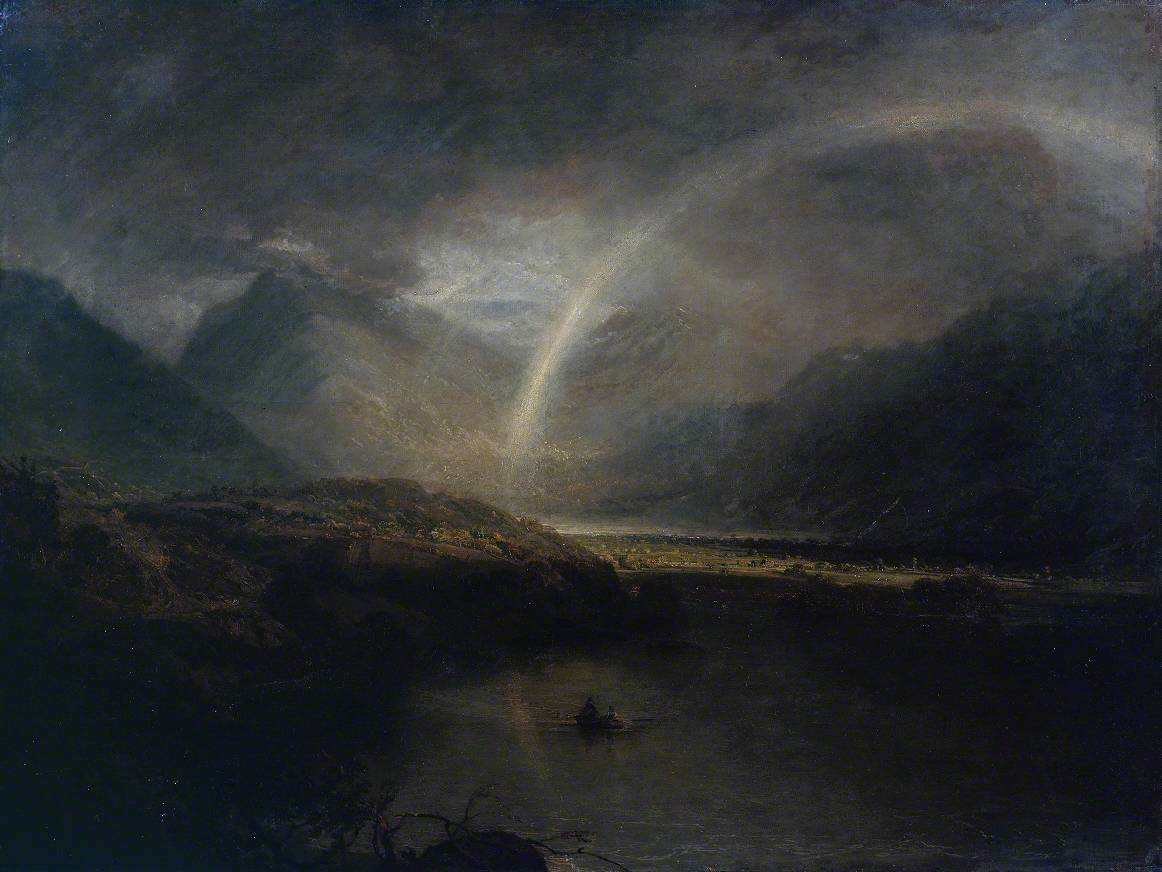
Buttermere Lake, 1798

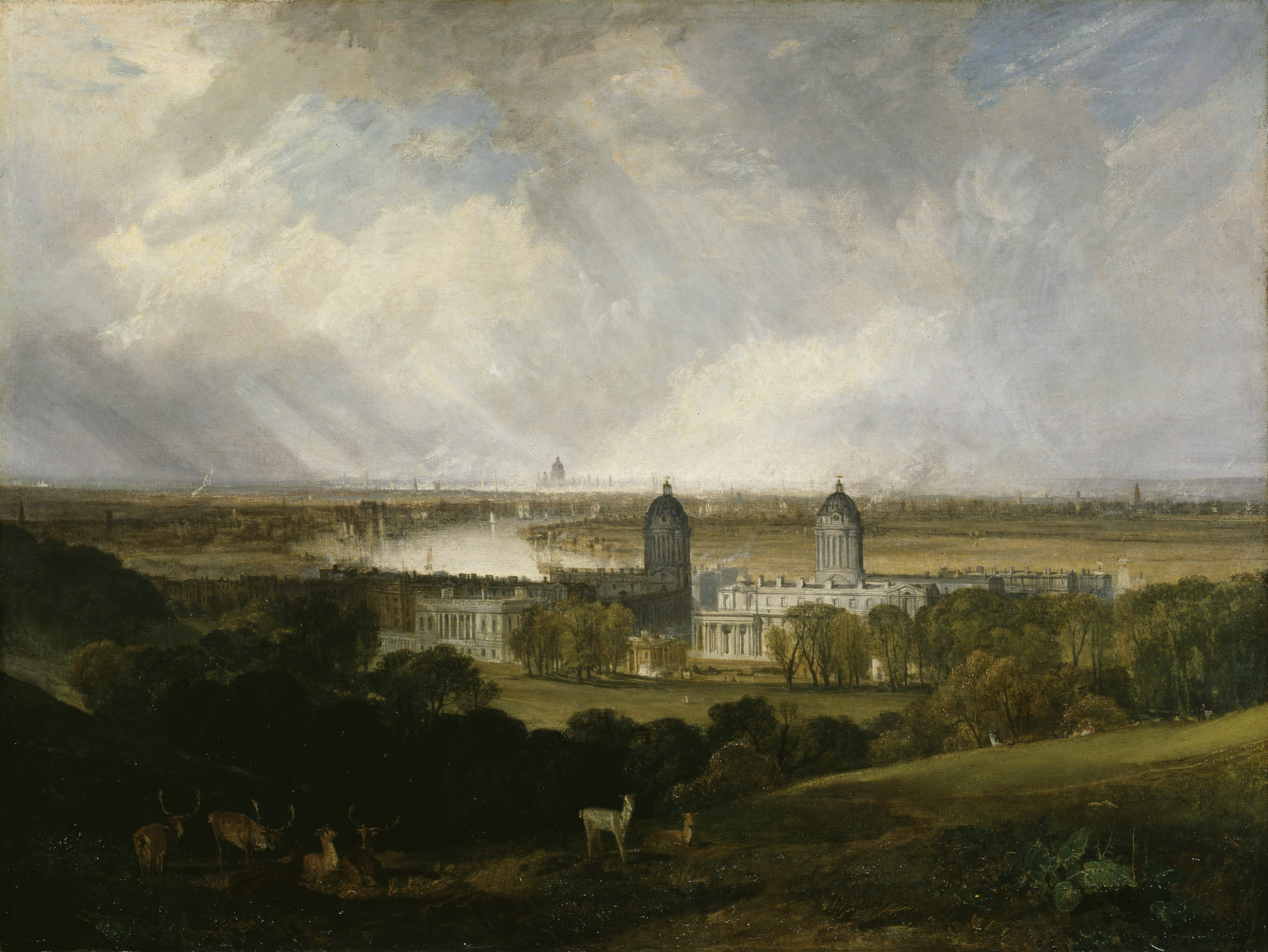
London from Greenwich Park, 1809

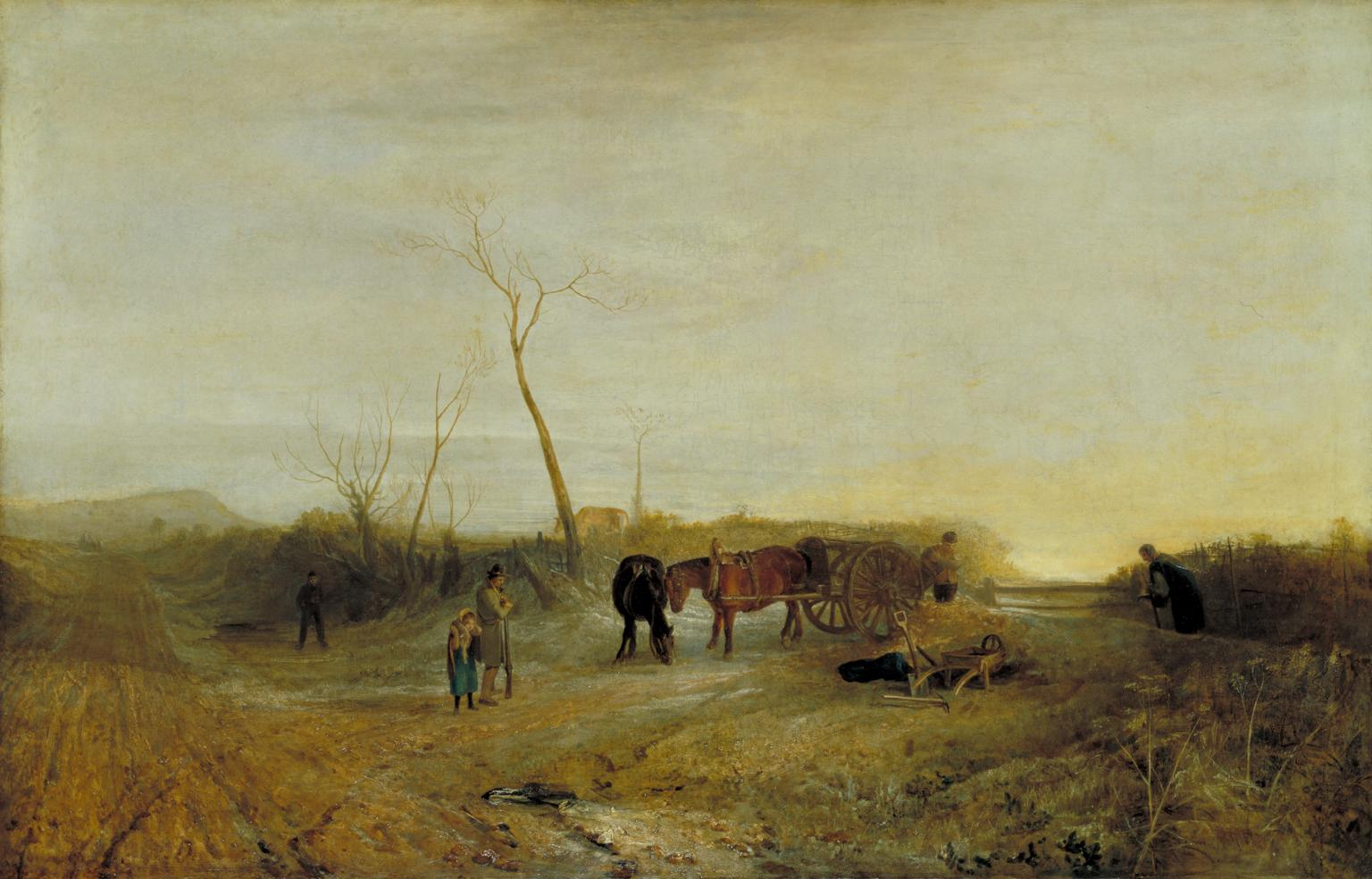
Frosty Morning, 1813

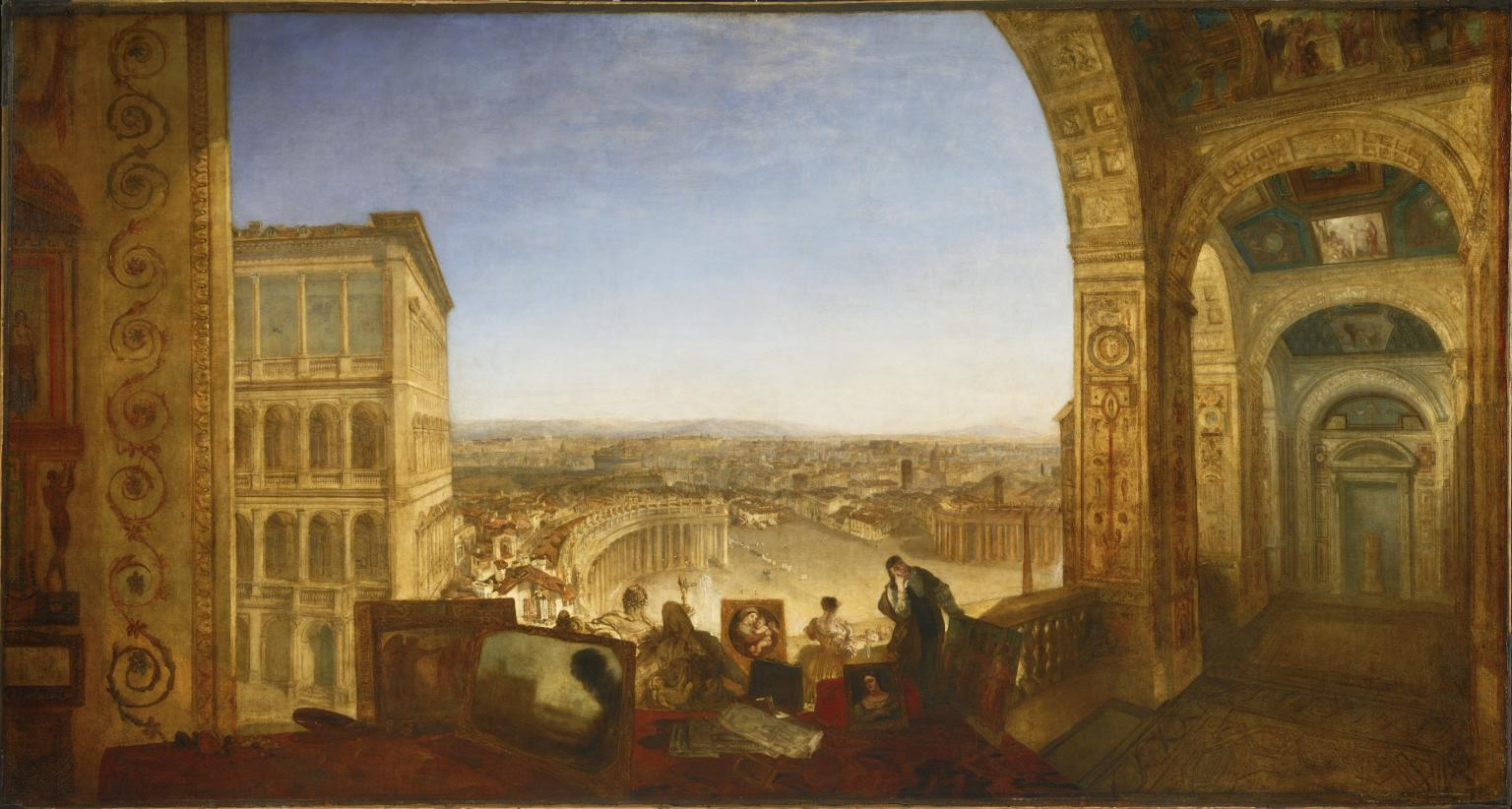
Rome from the Vatican, 1820

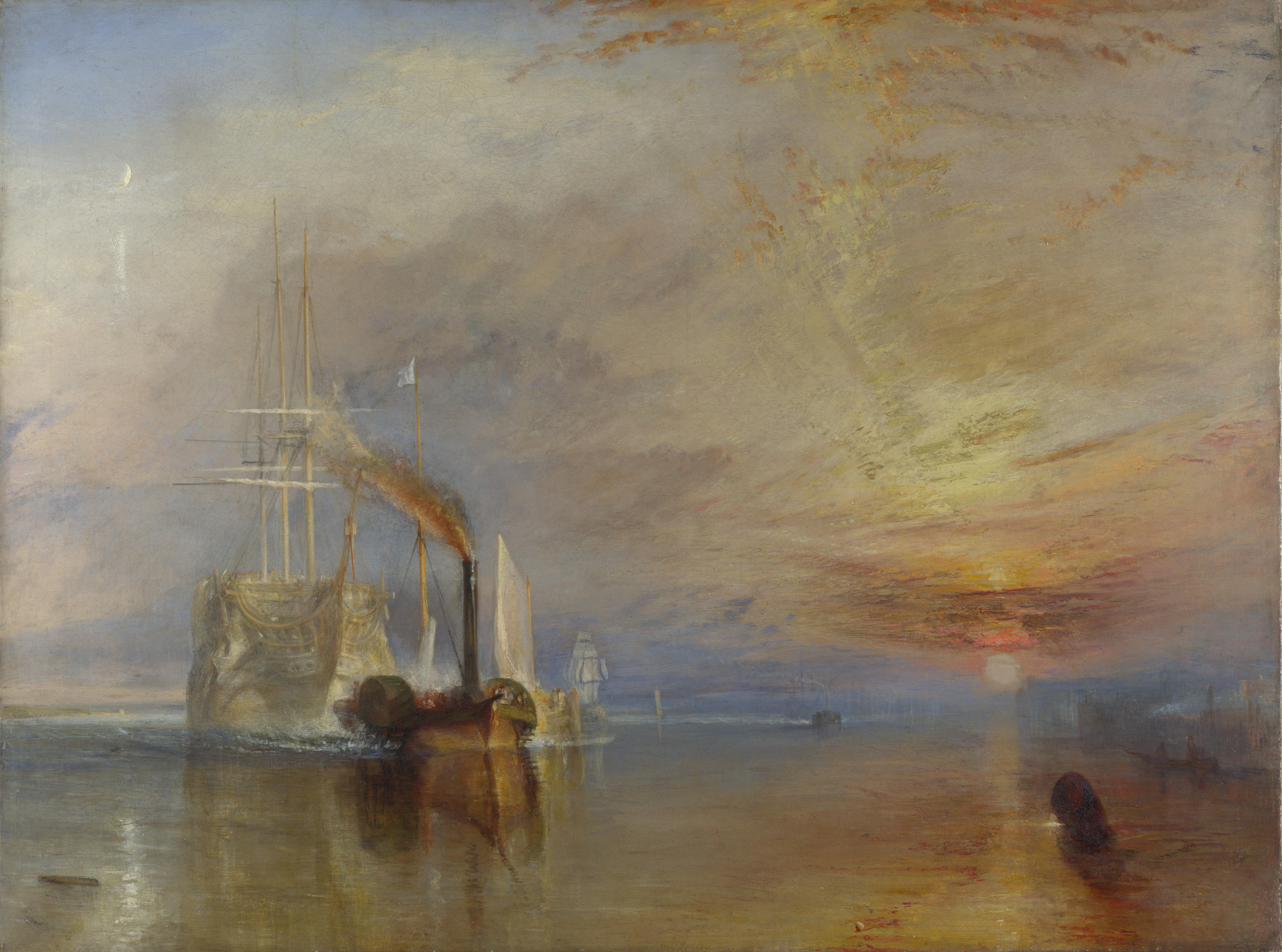
The Fighting Temeraire, 1838

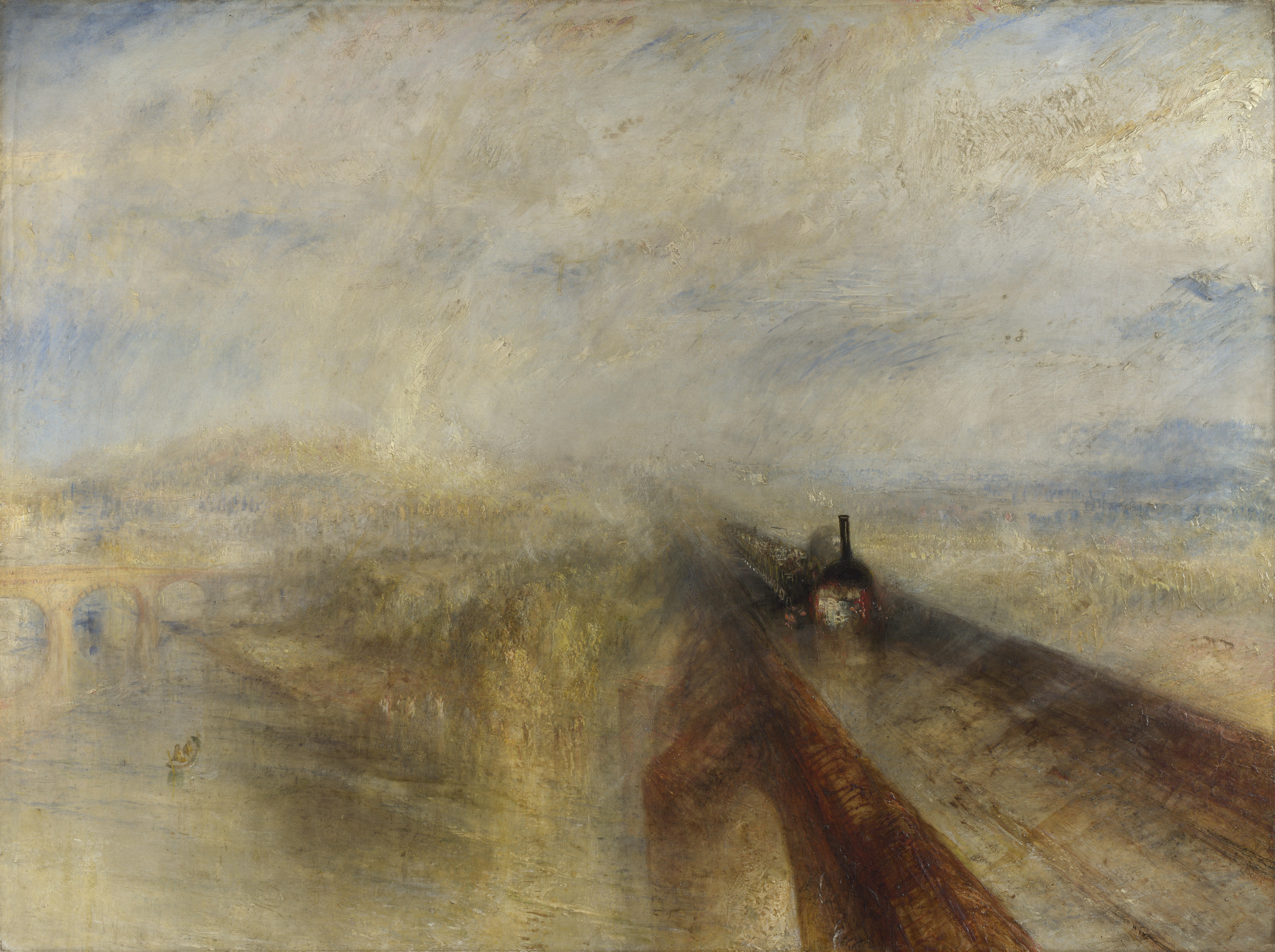
Rain, Steam and Speed – The Great Western Railway, 1845

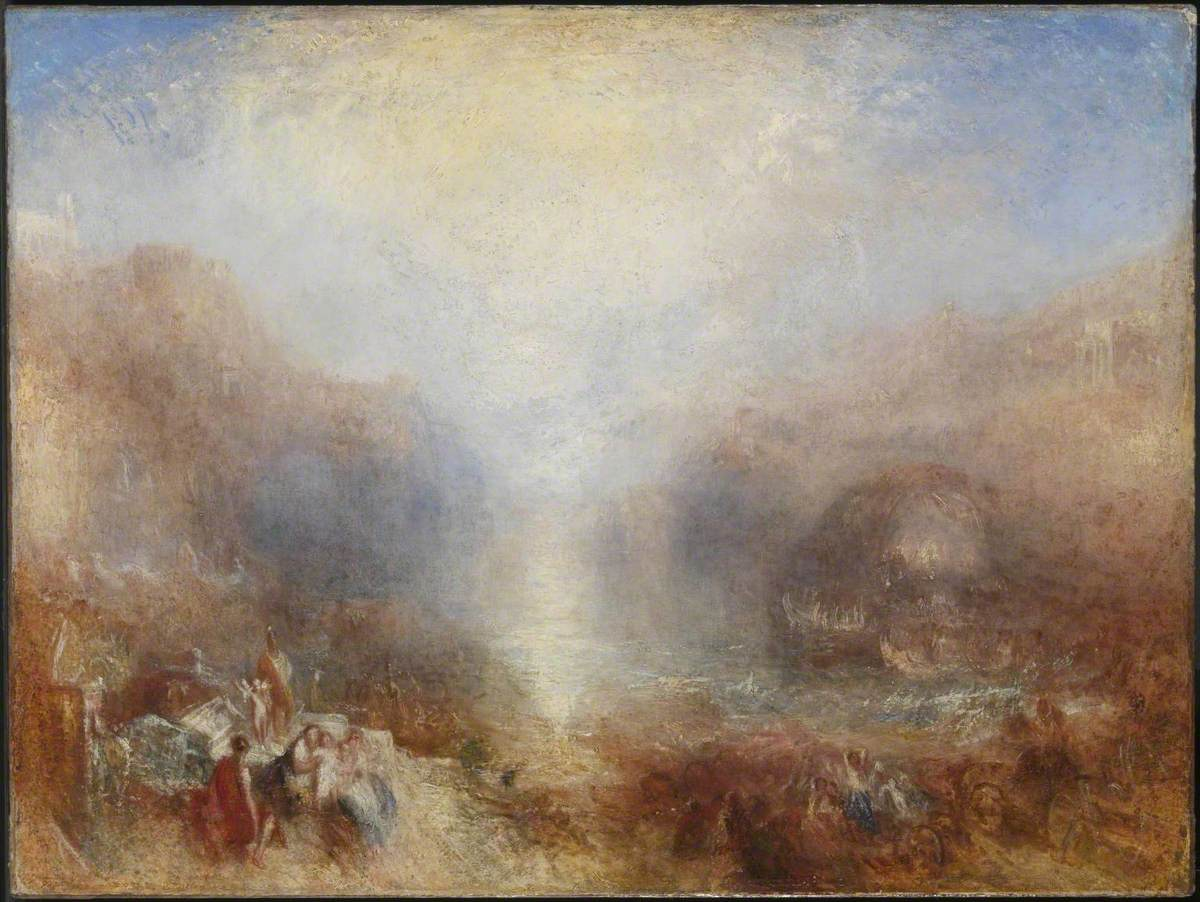
Mercury Sent to Admonish Aeneas, 1850

== See also ==
- Vernon Gift, an 1847 donation of British art to the National Gallery
- Sheepshanks Gift, an 1857 donation of British art to the Victoria and Albert Museum

== Bibliography ==
- Bailey, Anthony. J.M.W. Turner: Standing in the Sun. Tate Enterprises Ltd, 2013.
- Hamilton, James. A Strange Business:Making Art and Money in Nineteenth-Century Britain. Atlantic Books, 2014.
- Hamilton, James. Turner's Britain. Merrell, 2003.
- Moyle, Franny. Turner: The Extraordinary Life and Momentous Times of J. M. W. Turner. Penguin Books, 2016.
- Reynolds, Graham. Turner. Thames & Hudson, 2022.
