= Robert Heyssel =

Robert Morris Heyssel Sr. (June 19, 1928 – June 13, 2001) was President of Johns Hopkins Hospital from 1982 to 1992.

== Biography ==
Born in Jamestown, Missouri, Heyssel received his B.S. from the University of Missouri and his M.D. from Saint Louis University. After serving with the United States Public Health Service in Hiroshima and Nagasaki, Japan between 1956 and 1958, he returned to the United States as a fellow in hematology at Washington University in St. Louis.

=== Career At Johns Hopkins ===
Heyssel moved to Johns Hopkins in 1968, taking up the position of Associate Dean of the School of Medicine, and was named president in 1982. During his presidency he oversaw an ambitious program of building and redevelopment, and his role in this project is commemorated at the Johns Hopkins Outpatient Center, whose outpatient center building is named in his memory. In addition to expanding the hospital throughout his career, Heyssel also created the Johns Hopkins Health Plan, which shifted the status of care in the hospital to managed care, creating thousands of jobs in the process. Under his presidency, several failing Baltimore hospitals came into the possession of Johns Hopkins, all of which were eventually renovated and combined to form the Bayview Medical Center.

=== Death ===
Heyssel died from lung cancer in 2001 at the age of 72.
