= Rotterdam Ferry-Boat =

Painting by J. M. W. Turner

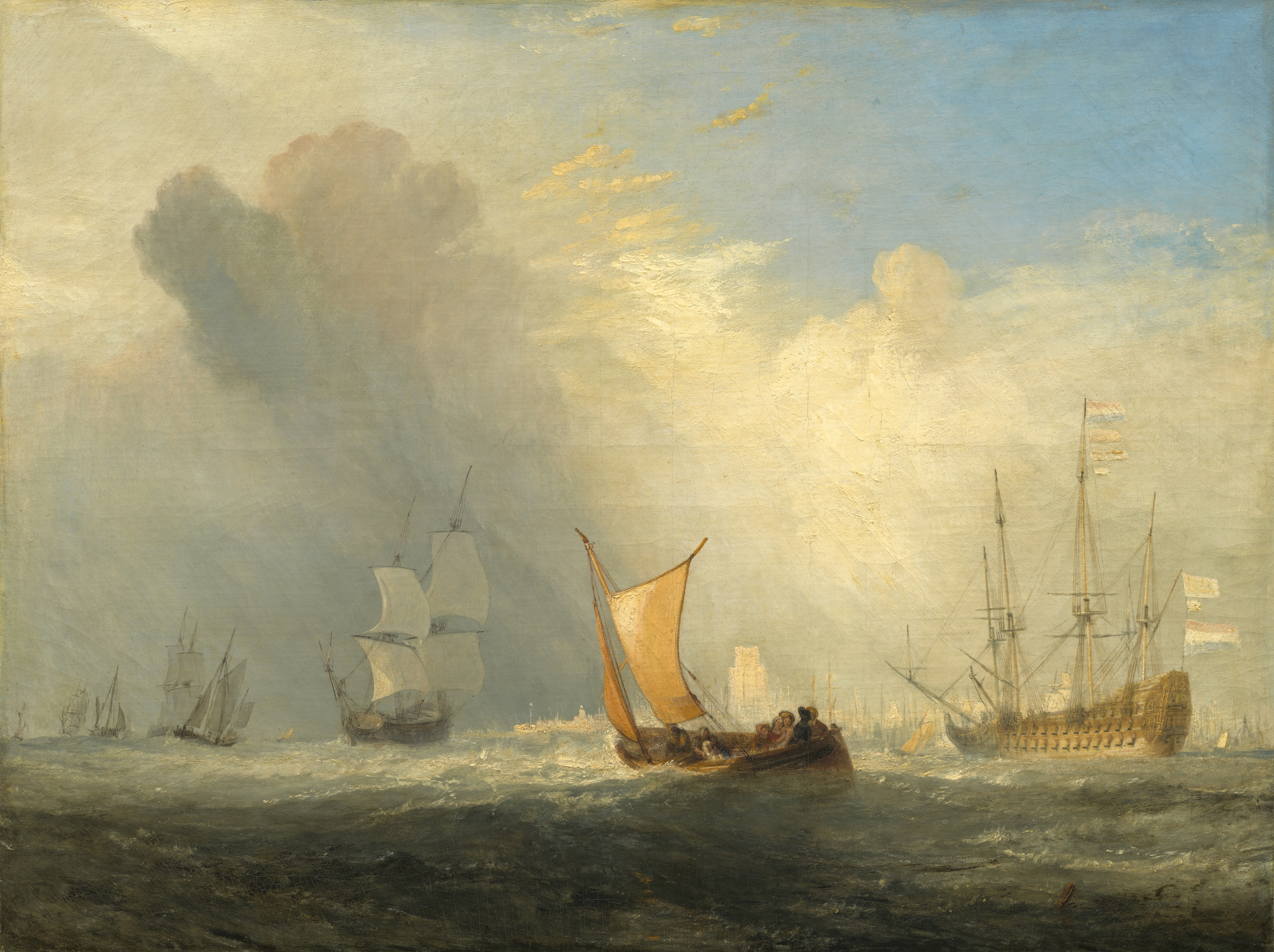
- Artist: J. M. W. Turner
- Year: 1833
- Type: Oil on canvas, landscape painting
- Dimensions: 92.3 cm × 122.5 cm (36.3 in × 48.2 in)
- Location: National Gallery of Art; Washington D.C.

'Rotterdam Ferry-Boat is an 1833 oil painting by the British artist J.M.W. Turner. It was one of a number of Dutch-themed seascapes Turner produced during the early 1830s. The picture features a ferry off the coast of Rotterdam. A warship of the Dutch Navy is shown in the background.

The painting was exhibited at the Royal Academy's Summer Exhibition of 1833 at Somerset House in London. The work has been in the collection of the National Gallery of Art in Washington D.C. since 1970.

== See also ==
- List of paintings by J. M. W. Turner

== Bibliography ==
- Bachrach, Fred G.H. Turner's Holland. Tate Gallery, 1994.
- Bailey, Anthony. J.M.W. Turner: Standing in the Sun. Tate Enterprises, 2013.
- Solkin, David. Turner and the Masters. Harry N. Abrams, 2009.
