= Thomas Turner (cricketer) =

Australian cricketer

Personal information
- Born: 7 March 1865; Nuriootpa, South Australia
- Died: 27 October 1936 (aged 71); Prospect, South Australia
- Bowling: Left-arm medium

Domestic team information
- Years: Team
- 1885/86–1888/89: South Australia
- 1887/88: Victoria
- Source: Cricinfo, 25 July 2015

Thomas Turner (7 March 1865 – 27 October 1936) was an Australian cricketer. He played five first-class cricket matches for Victoria and South Australia in the 1880s.
