= Thomas Turner (microbiologist) =

American microbiologist (1902–2002)

- Born: 1902; Prince Frederick, Maryland, U.S.
- Died: September 22, 2002 (aged 100); Baltimore, Maryland, U.S.
- Children: 2

Academic background
- Education: St. John's College (BS); University of Maryland, Baltimore (MD)

Academic work
- Discipline: Microbiology
- Sub-discipline: Infectious diseases

Thomas B. Turner (1902 – September 22, 2002) was an American microbiologist who worked as the dean of the Johns Hopkins School of Medicine from 1957 to 1968.

== Early life and education ==
Turner was born in Prince Frederick, Maryland. He earned a Bachelor of Science degree from St. John's College from the University of Maryland School of Medicine.

== Career ==
Turner joined the Johns Hopkins School of Medicine in the 1920s and remained at the university until 1968. During his final eleven years he worked as dean of the medical school. During World War II, Turner briefly left Johns Hopkins to manage the United States Army's syphilis eradication program. In the 1980s, Turner became the founding director of the Alcoholic Beverage Medical Research Foundation at Johns Hopkins.
