= Thomas Price Turner =

British musician

Thomas Price Turner (bapt. 17 January 1790 – 18 February 1868) was an English classical musician, and was one of the artist J. M. W. Turner's first cousins. Following the artist's death in 1851, Thomas Price Turner was one of a group of interested parties who contested J. M. W. Turner's will. The first cousins were awarded part of Turner's legacy in 1856.

Turner was a professor of music in his native Exeter and was a secondary at Exeter Cathedral from 1820 until 1857. He had his own band. He sang in the 1834 Handel Commemoration in London, as J. M. W. Turner noted on looking at the programme. Two years later Turner's daughter Maria Harriet married a London builder and surveyor, whom she later deserted for another husband.

Turner married Maria Pridham in 1865, some time after retiring from the cathedral and only a few years before his death in 1868. Maria had several children (Andrew, Charles, Maria) between 1847 and 1851 and is also recorded as being with Thomas in the UK Census Archives, though their exact relationship is unclear. Maria's children undoubtedly used the Turner name after the marriage between Thomas and Maria. It is unclear whether Turner was their natural father or their stepfather. Selby Whittingham (in The Turners of Devon) believed that he was the father.
