= J. M. W. Turner =

English painter (1775–1851)

Joseph Mallord William Turner RA
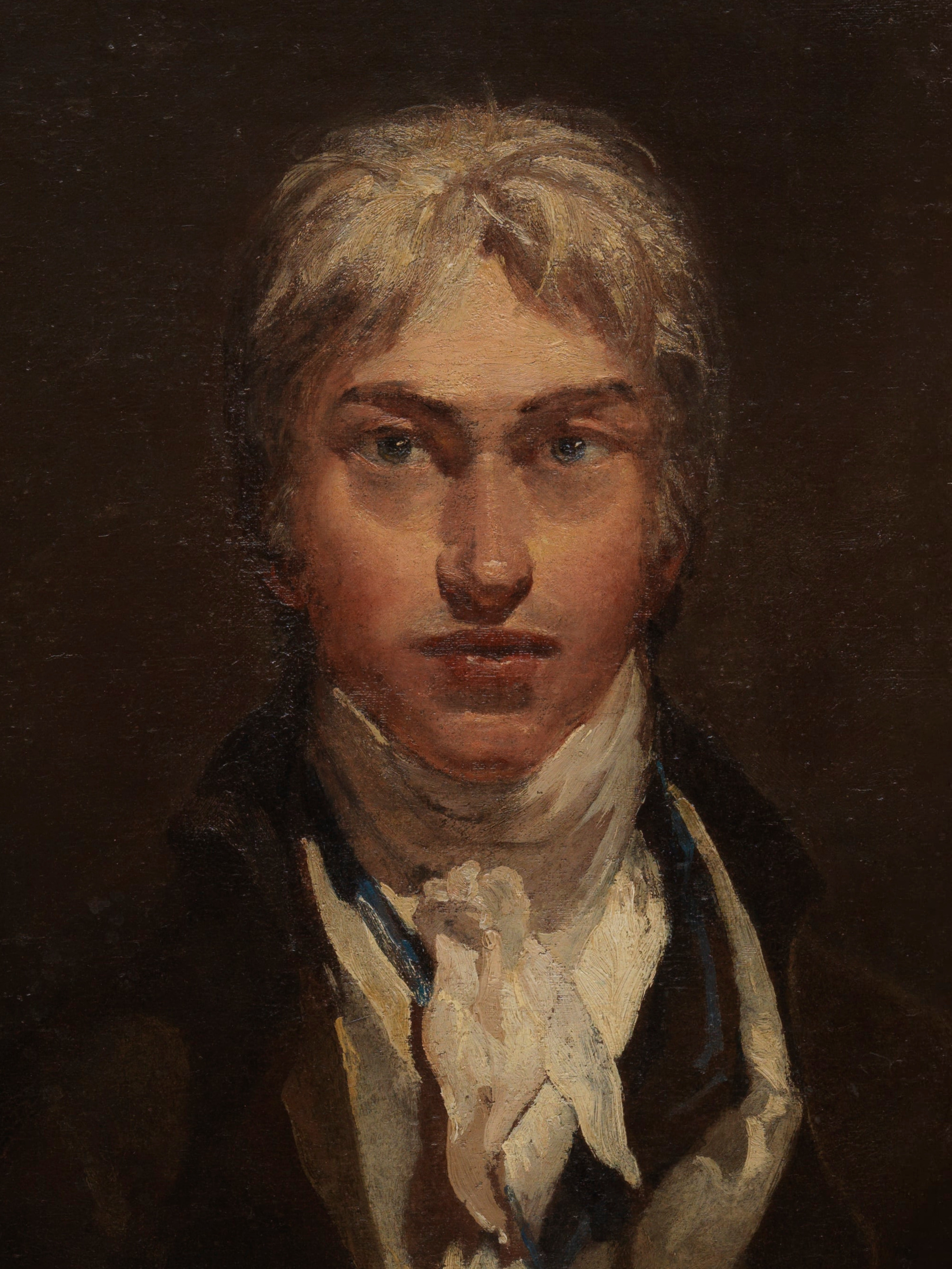
- Self-Portrait, c. 1799
- Born: 23 April 1775; Covent Garden, London, England
- Died: 19 December 1851 (aged 76); Chelsea, London, England
- Resting place: St Paul's Cathedral
- Education: Royal Academy of Arts
- Known for: Painting
- Notable work: The Fighting Temeraire; Rain, Steam and Speed; The Slave Ship; Snow Storm
- Movement: Romanticism

Joseph Mallord William Turner (23 April 1775 – 19 December 1851), known during his lifetime as William Turner, was an English Romantic painter who is regarded as one of the greatest British painters of the 19th century. His expressive renditions of light and atmosphere and bold use of colour in landscape painting inspired the early impressionist painters Claude Monet and Camille Pissarro.

Turner started his career as an architectural draughtsman and watercolourist and gained academic recognition as an oil painter. A child prodigy, he was accepted as a student at the Royal Academy of Arts at the age of 14 and quickly rose to fame and financial success. By his early twenties he was selling oil paintings at top market prices and gaining high praise from the academic establishment. By 27 he was a Royal Academician, the highest artistic honour at the time. He was one of the youngest painters to achieve this distinction in the Academy's history. Despite these accomplishments, a few influential critics in aristocratic circles constantly criticised him for his working-class origins.

Turner's artistic style evolved during his lifetime as he never stopped experimenting with new painting techniques. He was a versatile artist who could emulate the styles of Old Masters, producing works that earned admiration from Academicians and art critics. Early on, he started painting in an increasingly expressionistic style, using sketches from his extensive travels throughout England and Europe as inspiration. To complement his depictions of the ocean, rivers and mountains, he experimented with representing natural phenomena like sunlight, storms, clouds and fog. Turner's later landscapes became more abstract and were not well received at the time, but are today considered masterpieces. He was a prolific artist, producing about 550 oil paintings and over 2,000 watercolours during his lifetime.

Turner died a rich man in 1851, at the age of 76. Upon his death, his investments and properties were valued at £140,000 (equivalent to £17 million in 2025). He bequeathed to the nation around 100 finished and 200 unfinished oil paintings. His most important works are displayed at the National Gallery and the Tate Britain museums in London.

== Biography ==
=== Childhood ===
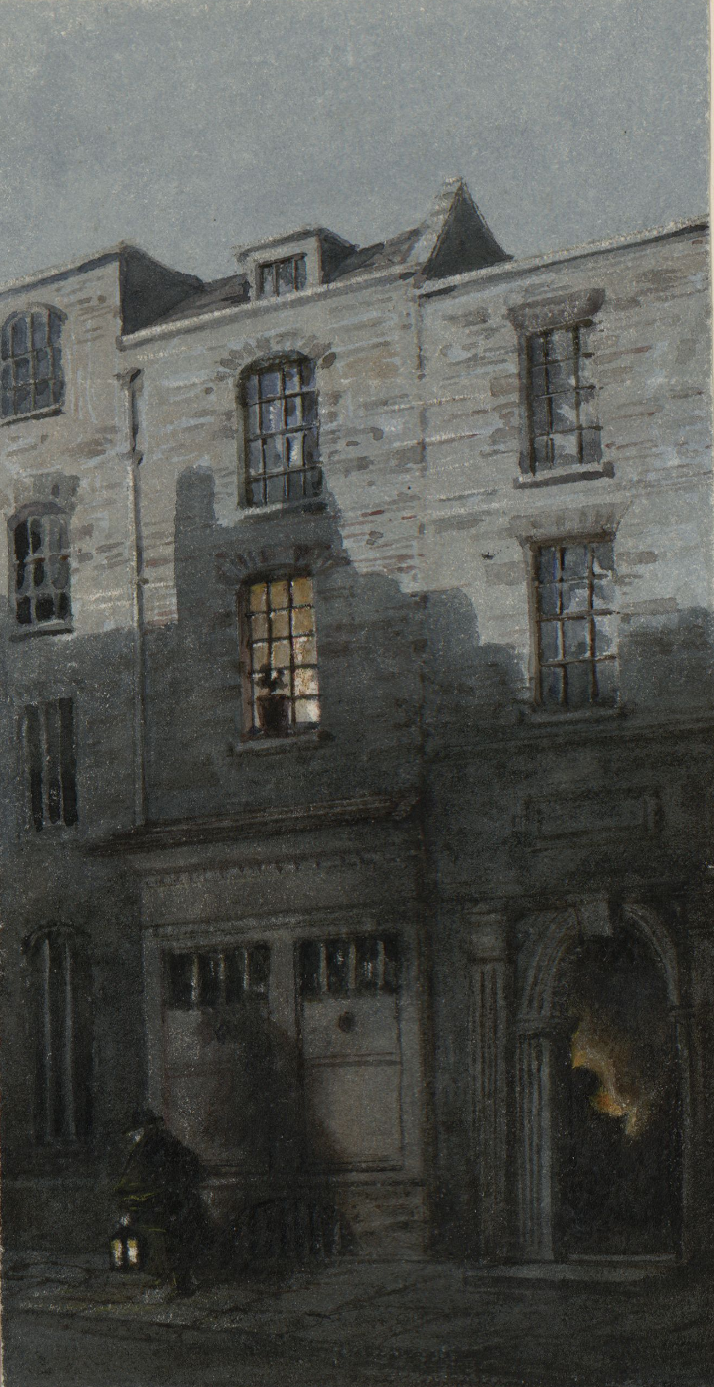
The house in Maiden Lane where Turner was born (as depicted by Frances Elizabeth Wynne, c.1850s).

Turner was born on 23 April 1775 (Note: There are no surviving records of Turner’s birth. This is the date Turner claimed when he was 21.) in a house on Maiden Lane, a street in London's working-class Covent Garden district; during the day it was a thriving commercial market and a busy area at night due to its concentration of theatres, taverns and brothels. (Note: "Maiden" Lane had a tongue-in-cheek meaning due to the sex workers that waited for customers in this street. The Cider's Cellar, a well known brothel, operated across the street from the Turners' home.) The family moved to Hand Court, on the other side from Maiden Lane, when Turner was five years old. Turner was sent to different towns to attend elementary school, including Brentford, Margate and Sunningwell (now part of Oxfordshire).

Turner's father, William Turner, had a barbershop and wig store on the first floor. By the time Turner was ten years old, he proudly displayed his young son's drawings in the window, which he let customers view up close for one shilling. His father boasted to the artist Thomas Stothard: "My son, sir, is going to be a painter". He would later retire as a barber to help his son in various tasks in his studio and paint gallery.

His mother, Mary Marshall, came from a family of butchers. (Note: "Mallord," an unusual second given name, was due to his mother's family's long line of butchers and Joseph "Mallards", going back to the 17th century. "The original duck-related name had evolved into the more distinguished 'Mallord'", notes Moorby.) She started to show symptoms of mental disorder and as they got worse, Turner's father was forced to place her in St Luke's Hospital for Lunatics. She was later moved to Bethlem Hospital, a mental asylum commonly known as "Bedlam", where she died in 1804.

=== Adult life ===
The inspiration Turner found in the river Thames motivated him to occupy several second homes on or very near the river. The river allowed him to relax by fishing and boating, two of his favourite activities. He rented houses in Isleworth (1804–1806) and Hammersmith, where he converted a boat into a floating studio (1807–1811). In 1811 he bought a plot of land in Twickenham, where he built a house he named Sandycombe Lodge. (Note: Turner's explorations of rough, mountainous terrain across England had made him a resilient walker, so he regularly made the 10-mile journey on foot between Twickenham and his house and studio in London.)

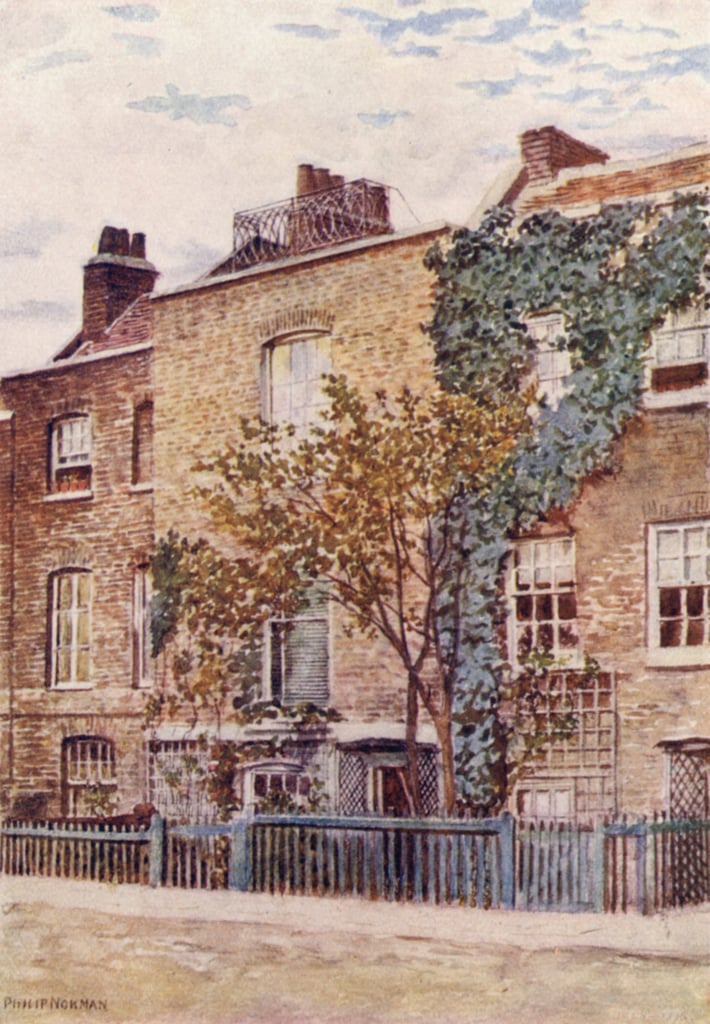
Philip Norman, Turner's House in Cheyne Walk, Chelsea (1887). Victoria and Albert Museum, London.

Turner never married, and reportedly said: "I hate married men, they never make any sacrifice to the Arts, but are always thinking of their duty to their wives and families, or some rubbish of that sort." From the beginning, he kept his personal life separate from his professional activities. He had a discreet 12-year relationship with his housekeeper, the widow Sarah Danby, and is generally believed to have been the father of her two older daughters, Evelina (Note: In 1817, when she was 16, Evelina married the British diplomat Joseph Dupuis) (b. 1801) and Georgiana (b. 1811).

=== Old age ===
Turner's appearance in his later years disconcerted those who met him, as it was difficult to imagine how such an unprepossessing man could produce paintings of such beauty. Observers reported he reminded them of "an English farmer", a "long-stage coachman" or a "river-boat sailor", rather than a renowned painter. When he was young, he invested in fine clothes in order to fit into academic circles, but in his fifties, following his father's death, he became careless about his appearance.

In his seventies, Turner formed a relationship with the widow Sophia Caroline Booth. (Note: After Turner's death, she said he only gave her "small sums" and never more than £20 pounds per year, even though at the time, he had around £80,000 in investments.) He frequently stayed with her under the pseudonym "Mr Booth" or "Admiral Booth", in her house at 6 Davis's Place (now Cheyne Walk) in Chelsea, London. He died at the house on 19 December 1851, at the age of 76. He is buried in St Paul's Cathedral.

=== Bequest ===
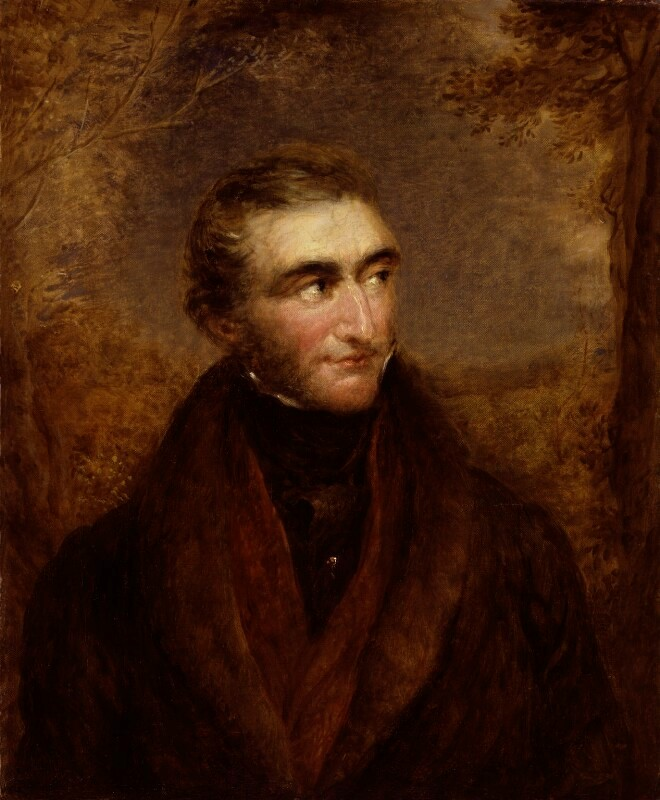
Turner, painted posthumously by John Linnell (1838)

In an unprecedented gesture, Turner bequeathed to the nation about 100 finished oil paintings as well as 200 unfinished canvases, over 19,000 sketches, drawings and watercolours and some 200 sketchbooks. The finished oil paintings were worth a small fortune, considering that they had been regularly purchased for no less than 200 guineas and up to 450 guineas during his lifetime. (Note: Turner’s “Hastings” notebook documents the large sums paid by various wealthy patrons for his paintings in 1810 and 1811: “Lord Pelham, £423.5.7; Lord Egremont, £428.11.3; Lord Lonsdale, £423.5.7.”)

His investments and properties were valued £140,000 (equivalent to £16.9 million in 2025). In 1856, after five years of legal disputes started by his cousins, his financial assets were divided among the family, and the Academy received £20,000. (Note: For context, the total annual expenses of the Academy in the 1850s was between £6,000 and £8,000.)

Turner specified that a new gallery should house the bequeathed paintings. At the time, this did not happen because they disagreed over the final site. In 1987, Tate Britain inaugurated the Clore Gallery, fulfilling his final wishes 136 years after his death.

== Career ==
=== Early commercial work ===
While still a young man, he secured a reliable income thanks to the rising demand for topographical and architectural watercolours. He worked for several architects, including Thomas Hardwick, James Wyatt and Joseph Bonomi the Elder. In 1789 he began to study under the topographical draughtsman Thomas Malton, who specialised in London views.

He was also hired to paint scenery for theatres. According to Bailey, this "made a lasting impression on him, [as] demonstrated in paintings in the following decades, in which he indulged his fondness for bright lights and flaring colours."

=== The Academy ===
Turner was recognised as a child prodigy and accepted into the Royal Academy Schools in 1789, at the age of 14, where he was an accomplished student and made rapid progress. Only a year after starting his studies, the watercolour A View of the Archbishop's Palace, Lambeth was accepted to the Academy's Annual Exhibition. In 1796, the Academy awarded the 18-year-old the Greater Silver Palette award for landscape drawing.

At 21, he exhibited the oil painting Fishermen at Sea, a dramatic moonlit seascape. The work drew widespread acclaim from contemporary critics and established Turner's reputation as a promising talent in marine painting. During his years at the Academy, Turner was keenly focused on obtaining academic recognition. (Note: According to Moorby, he used a clever strategy to accomplish this: "We need only look at the pictures he submitted for the Exhibition of 1799 – a bumper crop of four oils and seven watercolours – within which we see him self-consciously pitching for academic status and astutely checking all the right boxes for virtuosity, versatility and scholarly allusion".) He followed the teachings of Sir Joshua Reynolds, which at the time defined the Academy's criteria for judging artistic excellence. Reynolds advocated the study and emulation of the Old Masters, in particular those from Italy, Spain and the Netherlands.

Dutch Boats in a Gale copied the style of 17th-century Dutch marine painters and was presented the following year at the Royal Academy Exhibition of 1801 and "took the Academy by storm". It was hung in the best location of the whole exhibition: in the Great Room, centred, and opposite to the entrance. It so impressed the Academy and the art critics that the following year Turner was admitted as a Royal Academician. At only 27 years of age, he became the second youngest artist in the institution's history (Note: The erroneous belief that he was the youngest RA is widespread. But the painter Thomas Lawrence achieved this recognition at 24, three years earlier than Turner.) to achieve the highest artistic academic recognition in England. (Note: For comparison, John Constable, being only a year older than Turner, was accepted at the age of 52.)

Works Turner exhibited early in his career in the annual Royal Academy Exhibition
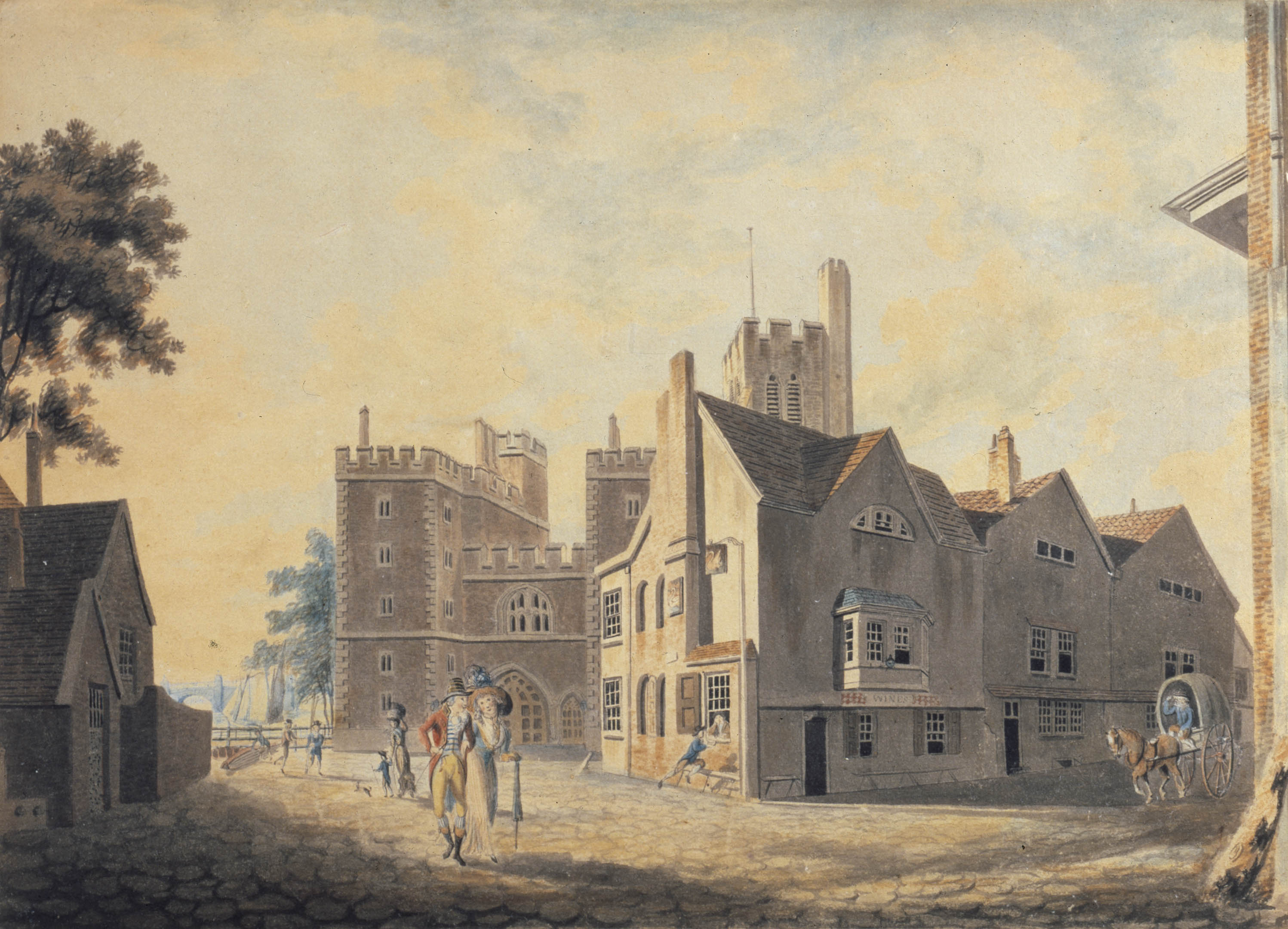
A View of the Archbishop's Palace, Lambeth (1790), watercolour. Indianapolis Museum of Art

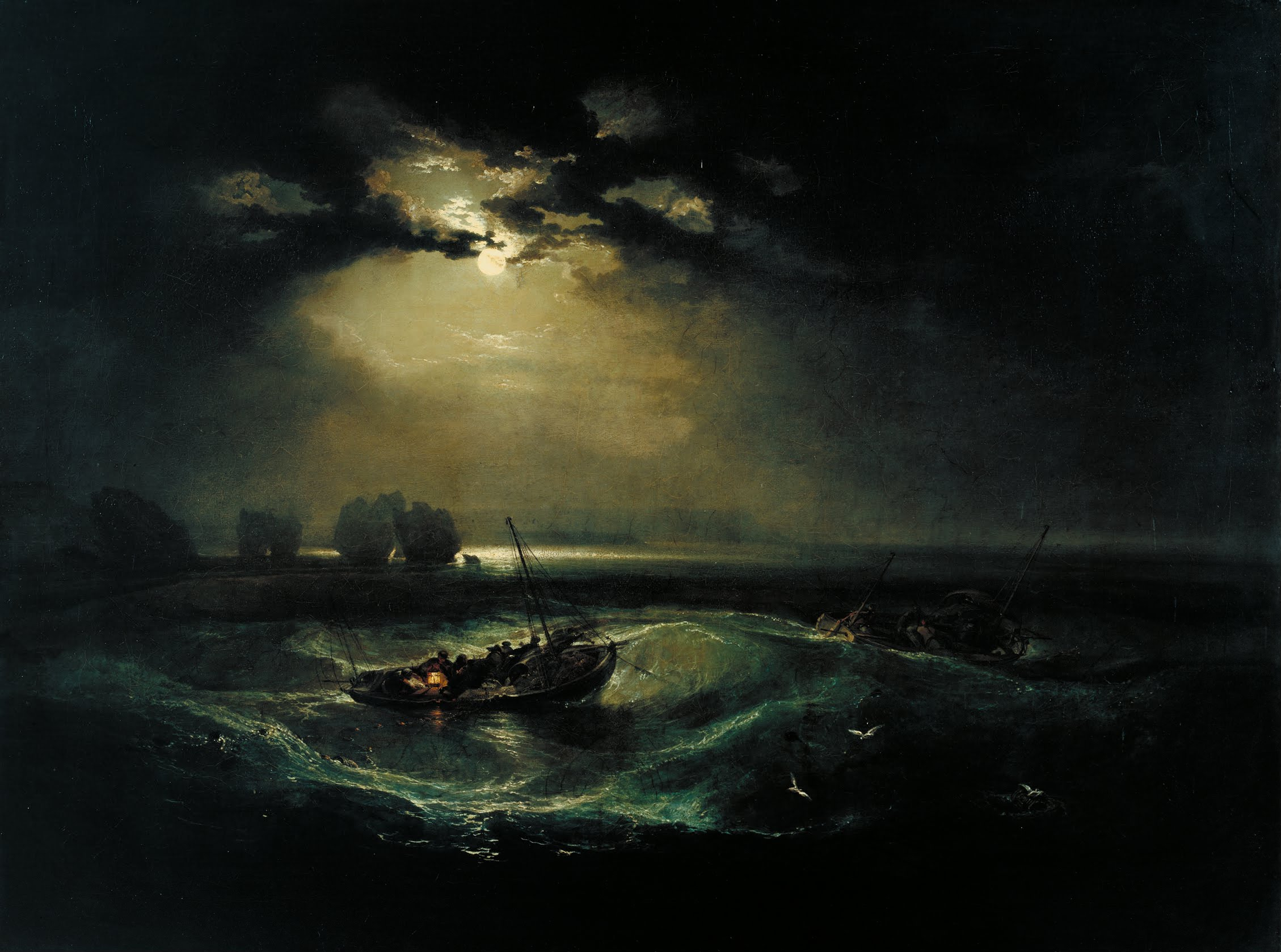
Fishermen at Sea (1796). Tate Britain, London.

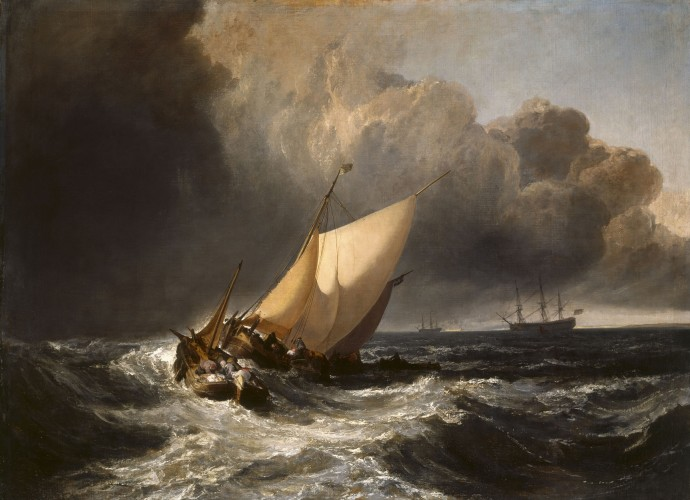
Dutch Boats in a Gale (1801). Tate Britain, London.

=== Commercial success ===
In October 1798, he told his friend Joseph Farington that he had 60 commissions for watercolours from different customers and was "earning more money than he could spend." During his sketching excursions, he was always searching for visual ideas but also on the lookout for saleable subjects.

Even though the Napoleonic Wars had considerably reduced the demand for large historical paintings, Turner kept selling them at top prices and receiving substantial commissions from wealthy patrons, which disconcerted older members of the Academy. He took advantage of the demand for pendants – works that were commissioned to hang next to an existing painting. As early as 1799, Turner had received 150 guineas for The Fifth Plague of Egypt from William Beckford. In 1801, Francis Egerton, 3rd Duke of Bridgewater, one of the richest men in England, paid him 250 guineas (equivalent to around £20,000 today) for the commissioned marine painting Dutch Boats in a Gale. He also sold many smaller pieces, which generated a steady income.

As Joshua Reynolds instructed, Turner began to emulate the Old Masters. Hamilton notes: "Turner could pick up his brushes and play anybody's tune: He made paintings in the style of Rembrandt, Rubens, Watteau, the Dutchmen Ruysdael, van Goyen and Cuyp, Claude, Poussin, Canaletto – the list goes on. No other great master had demonstrated this chameleon tendency with such seriousness, even to the slightest degree." His talent allowed him to go beyond pastiches and make each style his own – a sort of homage (and in some cases an indirect critique) of these classic works and "this playful chameleon tendency was extraordinarily disarming and had the effect of seducing the collector, catching him off guard."

In 1804, Turner opened his own gallery so he could sell his paintings directly, as he distrusted dealers. (Note: In his mid-sixties, he started doing business with the art dealer Thomas Griffith, as he recognised he was getting older and felt he wasted his time and upset himself by selling his paintings directly.) Also, a gallery allowed him to group pictures that he wanted to be seen together, something that was not under his control in the Royal Academy exhibitions. His father left his barbershop business to assist him in various tasks in the gallery and studio. (Note: As one of his tasks was to stretch and varnish his canvases when completed, Turner joked that his father "both started and finished his pictures.") For over a decade, the gallery was a regular feature of the London exhibition season of new artworks.

=== Patrons ===
An early patron, the art collector Thomas Monro, allowed young artists to study his collection. At Monro's home, Turner copied works of the major topographical and architectural draughtsmen of his time, perfecting his drawing skills. (Note: Turner noticed that the architectural watercolours made by John Robert Cozens in Monro's collection were more vibrant, realising he did it with the technique of gradation, a gradual change in colours to produce a three-dimensional effect. This technique also allowed a watercolour to better express a mood. Always resourceful, in order to remove colour from selected areas he found that with pieces of bread he could absorb the unwanted paint while still wet.)

Important support for his work also came from Walter Fawkes, owner of Farnley Hall, near Otley in Yorkshire. He visited Farnley Hall many summers from 1808 to 1824 and became almost part of the family, with a room assigned for his exclusive use. (Note: The stormy backdrop of Snow Storm: Hannibal and his Army Crossing the Alps was inspired by a storm he witnessed while he was staying at Farnley Hall.)

While he was young, Turner visited his patrons as a hired artist, but as he gained the status of the best painter in England, he was acknowledged as a self-made man and an equal by the aristocracy. He was a frequent guest of the rich and powerful George Wyndham, 3rd Earl of Egremont, at Petworth House in West Sussex, where he stayed as a guest and even had his own studio at Egremont's large country house. (Note: Petworth House still displays 20 paintings, the largest collection of his work outside the Tate."Petworth Park through Turner's eyes". National Trust. Archived from the original on 19 June 2025.)

=== Critics ===
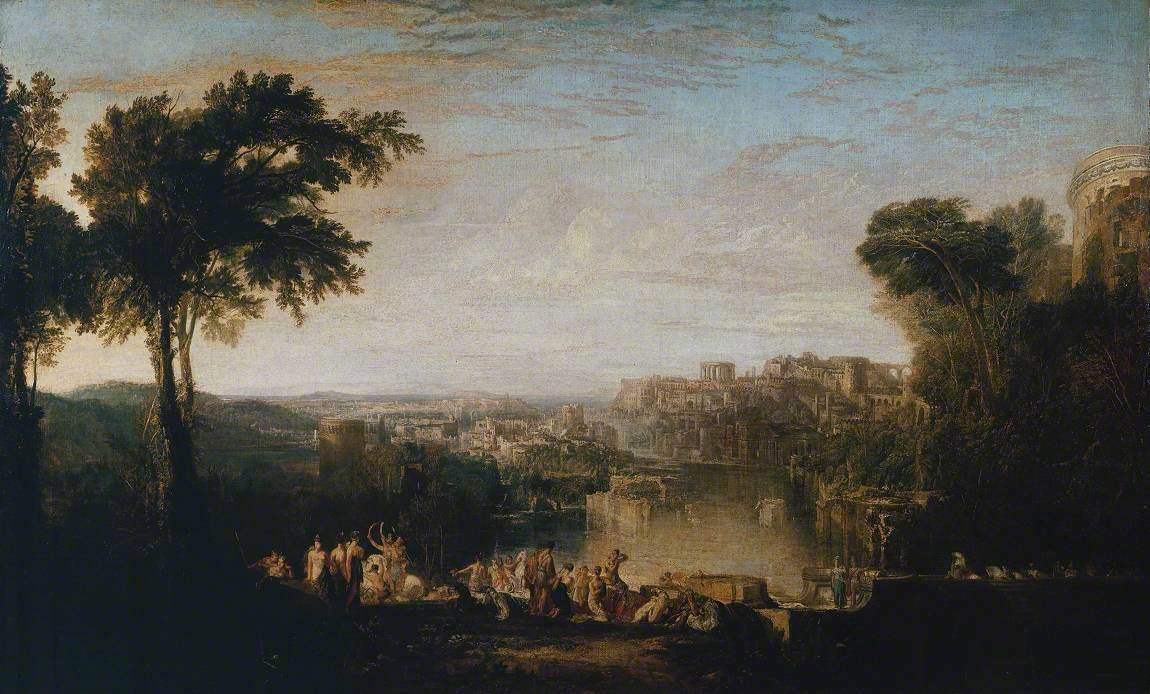
J.M.W. Turner, Dido and Aeneas (1814). Tate Britain, London.

Turner's more classical paintings from 1810 to 1830 were, in general, received with very positive reviews. His most successful works, like Dido and Aeneas (1814), The Bay of Baiae, with Apollo and the Sibyl (1823), Regulus (1828), and Ulysses Deriding Polyphemus (1829), garnered him a reputation as a painter that surpassed the old masters.

Early on, Turner started innovating in the representation of light and colour. These paintings elicited very negative comments, even from those who recognised his "earlier" genius. As an art critic wrote in 1827: "When we look back at the works of Turner of some twenty or twenty five years standing and see nature in all her truthfulness glowing under his powerful hand, it makes us as sick as she looks in his pictures now to see so needless a falling off."

Of what is considered today one of his masterpieces, Snow Storm: Steam-Boat off a Harbour's Mouth (1842), The Athenaeum wrote dismissively: "This gentleman has, on former occasions, chosen to paint with cream, or chocolate, yolk of egg, or currant jelly – here he uses his whole array of kitchen stuff. Where the steam-boat is – where the harbour begins or where it ends [...] are matters past our finding out." And in 1840, John Eagles called the displayed paintings "absurd extravagances [that] disgrace the Exhibition".

However, Turner also had passionate supporters. In 1816, the essayist William Hazlitt (1778-1830) described Turner as an artist that "delights to go back to the first chaos of the world, or to that state of things when the waters were separated from the dry land, and light from darkness." He insightfully described his landscapes as "pictures of nothing, and very like [their subjects]. They are pictures of the elements of air, earth, and water [...] forms are mere outlines to catch the eye in passing, and are not intended to be stopped at."

Turner's working-class origins generated friction with aristocratic members of the Academy as he started to gain increasing recognition. He had a strong cockney (working-class) accent which he never made any effort to disguise. The influential Sir George Beaumont was one of his most acrimonious critics, (Note: According to Morales, Beaumont saw "in [Turner's] growing success, [...] a threat to his own standing as connoisseur. Alarmed at the painter's influence on younger artists, Beaumont carried out a defamation campaign aimed at belittling Turner's prestige.") describing his paintings as "blots" or the sea in his widely acclaimed Dutch Boats in a Gale as looking "like pease [sic] soup". Academy tensions occasionally produced personal invective; following a heated Academy council meeting in 1803, his fellow Academician Sir Francis Bourgeois publicly called Turner a "little reptile."

In spite of the criticism and personal attacks by senior members of the Royal Academy, Turner always held it in the highest regard. The value of his bequest to the Academy is a good indication of the esteem that Turner had for the institution.

=== Printmaking ===
J.M.W. Turner, Inverary Pier, from the Liber Studiorum (1851). Ashmolean Museum, Oxford

From an early age, Turner understood the commercial opportunities in printmaking; only rich people could afford original oil paintings, but quality prints could be acquired for a few shillings. He favoured mezzotints, as they are especially suited to reproducing the tonal density of oil painting.

Turner's major venture into printmaking was the Liber Studiorum or "Book of Studies", a set of about 70 mezzotints that he worked on from 1806 to 1819. The Liber Studiorum was an ambitious print project that was inspired by the landscape painter Claude's Liber Veritatis, a set of prints based on his paintings. (Note: Claude had made 195 drawings as a record of his own works, so that it was easier to identify fakes of his paintings.) The Liber Studiorum was meant as a manifesto for British landscape art and a way to promote Turner's creative range. The plates were categorised into six genres: marine, mountainous, pastoral, historical, architectural, and epic pastoral. Although the artistic value of these prints was widely recognised, as a commercial endeavour they were a failure, due to his poor handling of the sales and distribution process. However, the Liber Studiorum was successful in elevating the prestige of landscape painting, a lifelong struggle of Turner.

=== Professor of Perspective ===
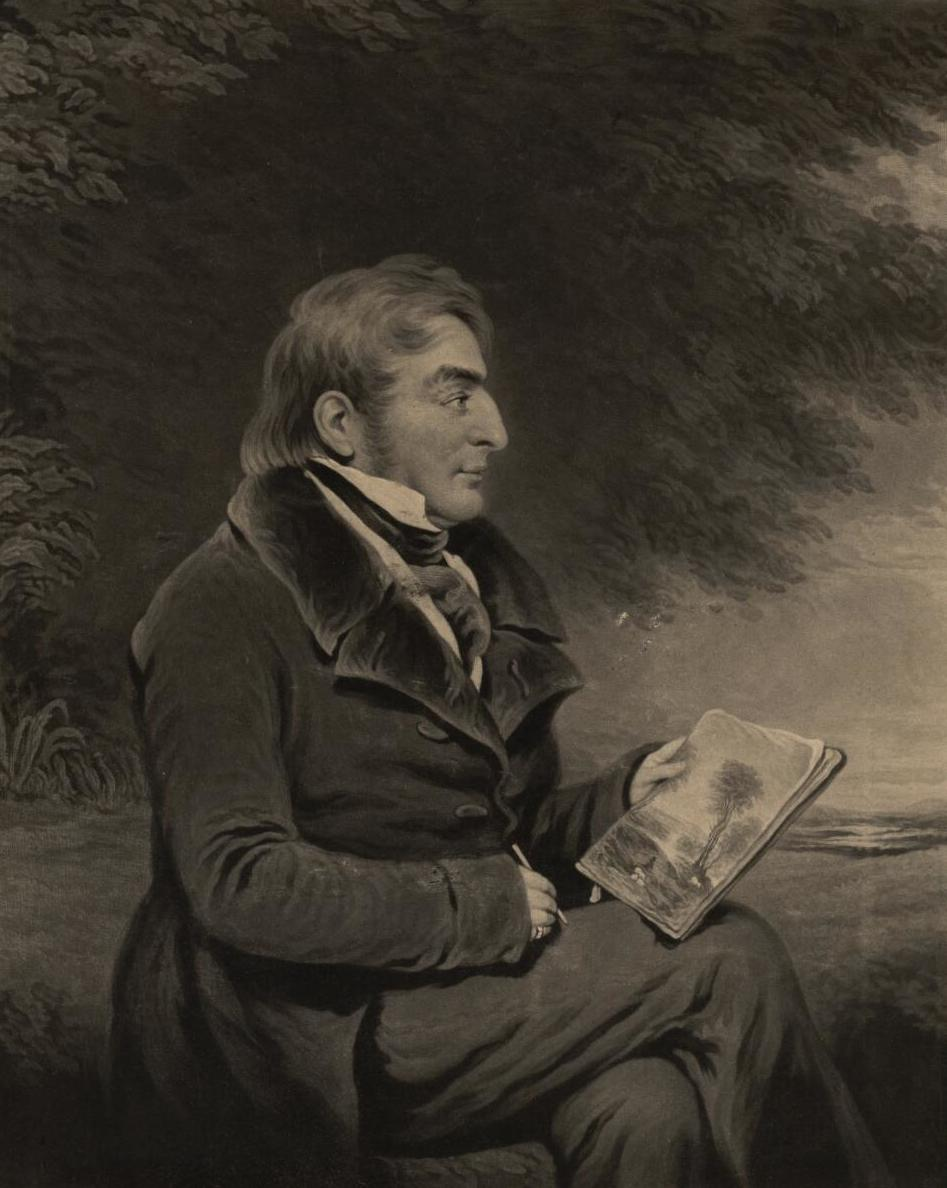
Charles Turner, c.1840, Portrait of J. M. W. Turner, making his sketch for the celebrated picture of 'Mercury & Argus' (exhibited in 1836).

In 1811 Turner made his first public lecture, after being elected as Professor of Perspective at the Royal Academy Schools three years earlier. (Note: Although the delay was unusual, it was not unique. George Dance, Professor of Architecture, had never given a public lecture. He lectured from 1811 to 1828, although not every year.) As a former architectural draughtsman, Turner knew his topic well. In the three-year period of preparation since his nomination and the start of his lectures, he had done a great amount of research, and he presented ideas on many subjects other than perspective, including the role of poetry in painting as well as landscape painting techniques.

Turner argued that the classic notions of single linear perspective were not applicable in all cases, because a painter had to take into account the curvature of things, for instance, to depict a meandering river in a graceful manner, with one of his students later commenting that "his pictures always looked right, even if the perspective in them was theoretically faulty."

Unfortunately, Turner had poor lecturing skills, and those in attendance struggled to understand him. He was very disorganised and frequently got confused about where he was and what came next; he strayed from the main topic and he used unintelligible sentences. His association of ideas was complex and not understood by his audience. But for all his shortcomings as a lecturer, Turner was valued as a teacher in the Academy Schools, and former students wrote that they were grateful for the valuable advice he gave them during their studio classes. (Note: The English painter Richard Redgrave observed he did it with "a few indistinct words, a wave of the hand, a poke in the side, pointing at the same time to some part of the student’s drawing, but saying nothing more than a ‘Humph!’ or ‘What’s that for?’ Yet the fault hinted at, the thing to be altered was there." Quoted from Redgrave, R., and S. Redgrave, A Century of British Painters, ed. L. Goldscheider (London: Phaidon Press, 1947; first published 1866) in:)

=== The "grand old man" of the Academy ===
Despite criticism and personal attacks from senior members of the Academy, Turner remained deeply loyal to it. In one of his lectures, he referred to it as the institution "to which I owe everything".His post as a Professor of Perspective changed his attitude towards the Academy; from a critic in his youth, starting in 1811 he became a combative defender of its reputation and worked constantly to improve the quality of its teaching.

In his old age, Turner became the "undisputed grand old man of the Academy." Yet he was not considered as a candidate to become its president. Because the institution depended on royal and aristocratic patronage, it required a leader with courtier skills. Turner’s lack of diplomacy, unprepossessing appearance and working-class origins disqualified him from this position.

== Travels ==
J.W.M. Turner, Mount St. Gothard plate, Liber Studiorum (1808).

Beginning in 1791, Turner established an annual routine that he followed until his sixties. He stayed in London during the exhibition of the Royal Academy in the summer, and travelled during the following months. He was an avid sketcher, capturing everything he encountered: panoramic vistas, clouds and rock formations. He used these sketches as a reference for his watercolours, prints, and oil paintings, even years later. During his lifetime, he filled nearly 300 sketchbooks, most of them during these travels.

=== The Thames ===
The River Thames with Isleworth Ferry (1805), watercolour.

With the exception of the sea, the Thames remained his most repeated subject during his 60-year career. Born only a few yards from the river, he always lived very near to it.

During the summer of 1805, he sketched scenes along the river, from Oxford to the Thames Estuary. These months of observation so inspired him that for the next five or six years he presented many river-themed paintings in each of his annual gallery shows, based on his sketchbooks' contents. In the period from 1822 to 1824 he painted The Rivers of England, a series of watercolours commissioned by the printmakers George and Bernard Cooke.

=== Tours of England and Scotland ===
During the years of war in Europe, the variability of Britain’s climate and geography started to be considered a valuable source of artistic inspiration. Early on he had started producing topographical works; views of places having historical or antiquarian interest, such as landscapes or old buildings, many of which were old ruins.

Turner toured England and Scotland extensively, motivated as always by the thrill of new landscapes, but also for commercial reasons. In 1799, he travelled to Lancashire to produce views for Thomas Dunham Whitaker's History of Whalley. In 1811, he entered into a publishing partnership with John Murray and the Cooke brothers to print Picturesque Views on the Southern Coast of England. During the 1820s, he worked on several topographical print commissions: he completed Picturesque Views on the Southern Coast of England (1814–1826) and The Rivers of England (1822–1826) for the Cooke brothers; provided drawings for Picturesque Views in England and Wales (1824–1838) commissioned by Charles Heath; and for The Ports of England (1825–1828) by commission from Thomas Lupton.

=== Discovering Europe ===
Due to the French Revolutionary and Napoleonic Wars, the one-year period of the Peace of Amiens (1802–1803) was the only time without wars in Europe from 1793 to 1814, and in that year a consortium of noblemen sponsored a visit to Paris, which allowed Turner to see Old Masters' paintings in the Louvre, and then he toured the Swiss Alps. His Alpine sketches would later allow him to impressively represent the sublime – one of the key aesthetic principles of the 18th and 19th centuries. Turner would go back to Switzerland three more times during his lifetime.

In 1819, Turner made his first extended journey through Italy, producing numerous sketches and watercolours.He returned to Venice in 1833.

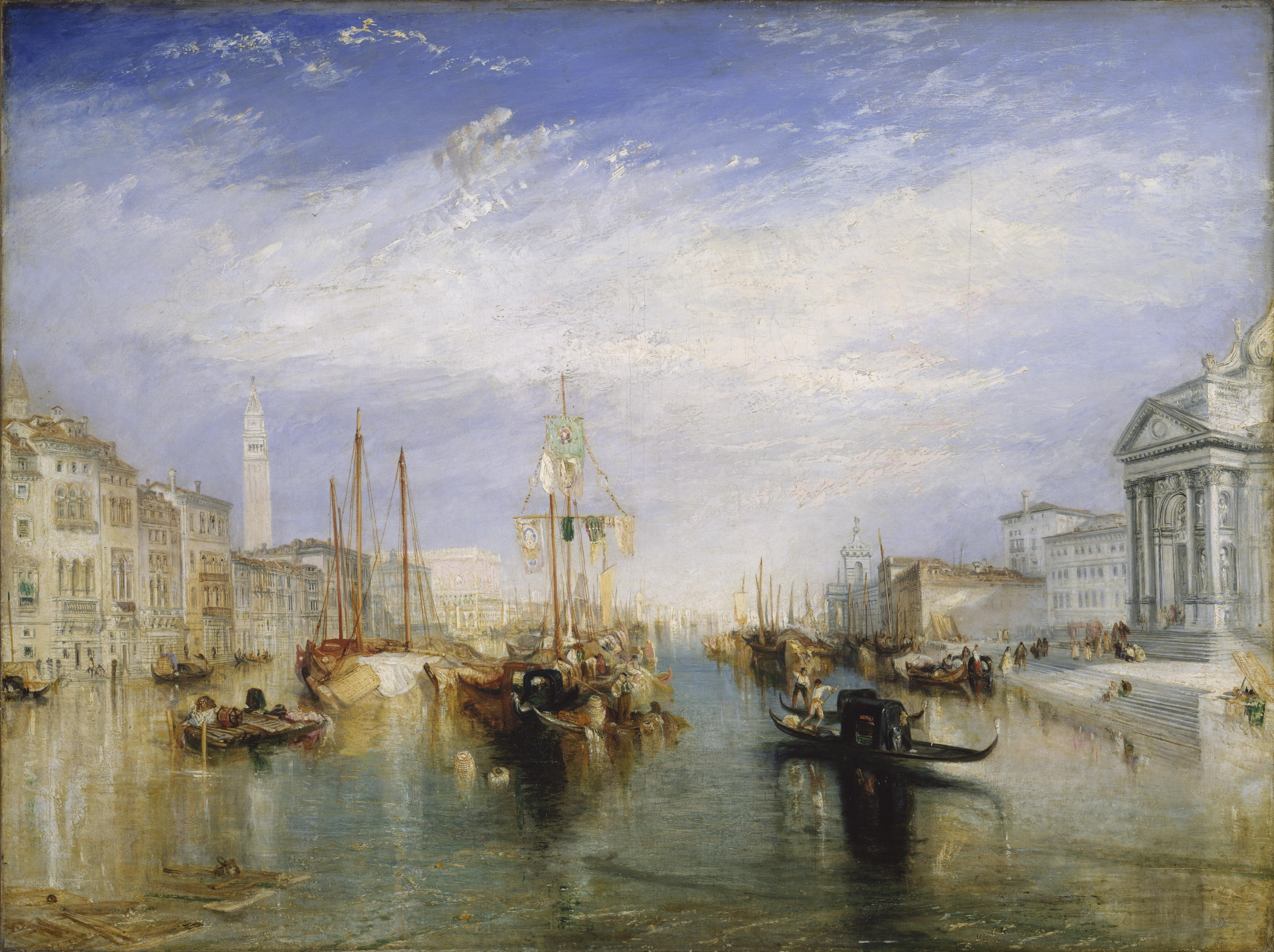
Venice, from the Porch of Madonna della Salute (c. 1835), Metropolitan Museum of Art, New York

In the twenty-year period from 1821 to 1844, Turner visited several European countries, where he studied the works of old masters and took long hikes into the countryside. His desire to see the world took him to Paris, Normandy and Brittany (1829); a second visit to Paris three years later (1832); Vienna and Venice, travelling down the Danube and returning via the Rhine (1833); Denmark, Prussia, Hamburg and Rotterdam (1835); France and Switzerland and across the Alps to the Aosta Valley (1836) (Note: He had painted an alpine mountain pass and the Val d'Aosta valley in Snow Storm: Hannibal and his Army Crossing the Alps from his imagination in 1812.); a second trip to Venice, also visiting Trieste and Coburg (1840); and two final trips to Switzerland in his sixties (1841 and 1844).

== Aesthetics ==
Turner frequently worked in starkly different styles in parallel. He might exhibit a meticulously composed painting in a classical style alongside a near–abstract canvas with dissolving forms; or he could follow a picturesque countryside landscape with an expressionistic depiction of a dark and violent storm. According to Hamilton, "Turner progressed in his art as does an embroiderer or seamstress, pressing forward but also going backward under a stitch to bring the thread round again to the head of the line."

=== Emulating Old Masters ===
Throughout his career, Turner was guided by the teachings of Sir Joshua Reynolds, the first president of the Royal Academy. Reynolds encouraged painters to study and emulate the style of the Old Masters. (Note: While following Reynolds teachings, Turner was also very conscious of the interests of art collectors and large paintings in the Old Master's styles were very popular and could be sold at high prices.) However, Turner's talent allowed him to go beyond pastiches and make each style his own. As Morales explains: "Turner established a sort of dialogue with the Old Masters in that he did not limit himself to copying or borrowing slavishly from them – he attempted to understand the style of those painters." (Note: While following Reynolds teachings, Turner was also very conscious of the interests of art collectors and large paintings in the Old Master's styles were very popular and could be sold at high prices.)

The deepest and most lasting influence on him was the work of the classical French painter Claude Lorrain (c. 1600–1682). (Note: In his formative years, Turner was also influenced by the styles of Thomas Gainsborough (1727-1788), Philip James de Loutherbourg (1740-1812), Henry Fuseli (1741-1825) and Richard Wilson (1714 -1782).) In 1799, the wealthy art collector John Julius Angerstein invited him to see his paintings. (Note: Angerstein's collection was bought by the government after his death, in 1824, and led to the founding of the National Gallery in his house at 100 Pall Mall, London.) While standing in front of Claude’s The Embarkation of the Queen of Sheba (1648), Turner burst into tears. When questioned by the disconcerted Angerstein, he explained: “Because I shall never be able to paint anything like that picture!” When he finished Dido Building Carthage in 1815, he felt he had finally achieved something comparable in artistic quality to Claude's painting.

Comparison of the works from Claude and Turner
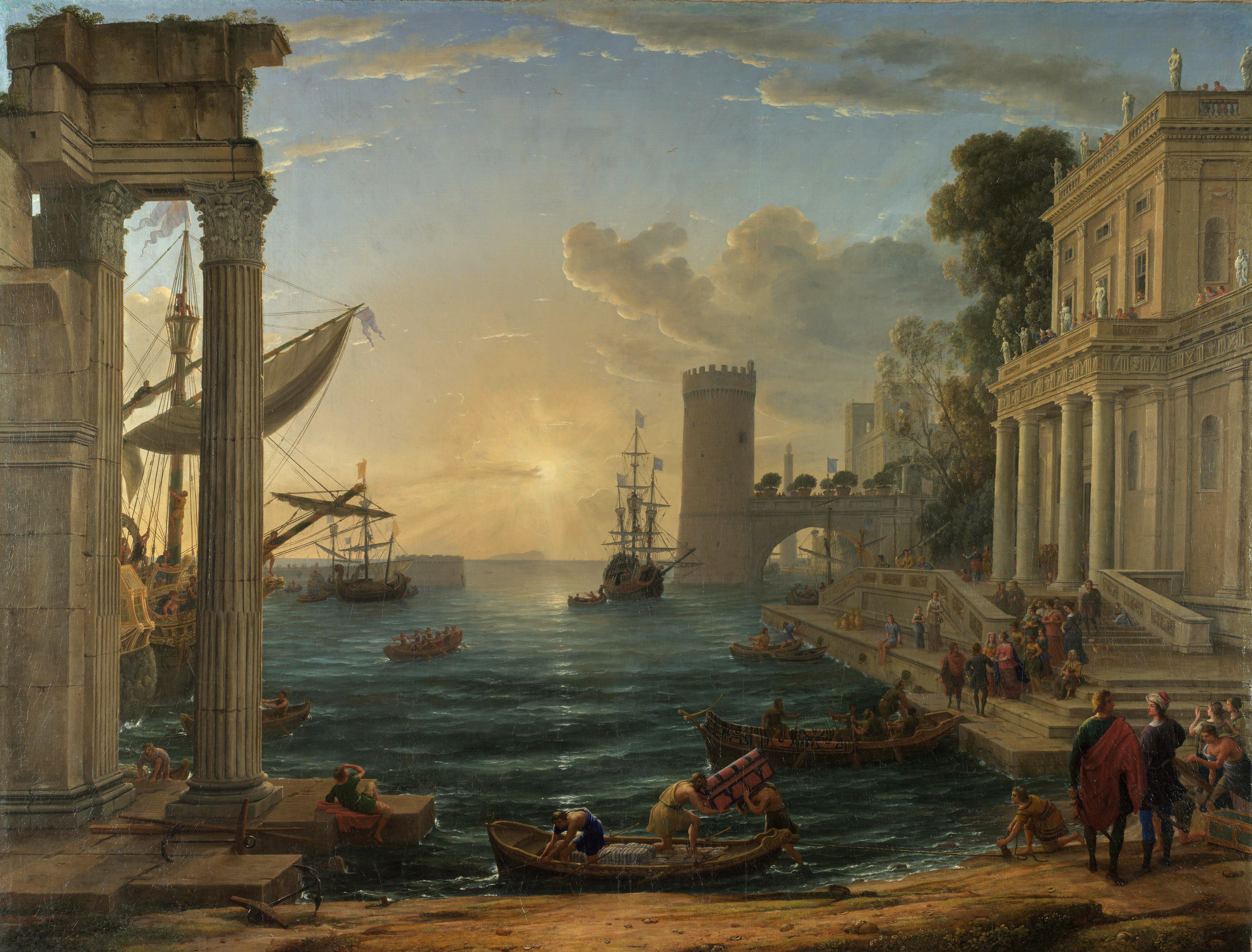
Claude Lorrain, The Embarkation of the Queen of Sheba (1648). National Gallery, London.

J.M.W. Turner, Dido Building Carthage (1815). National Gallery, London.

Turner showed a superior range to that of other painters. According to Hamilton:

"Turner could pick up his brushes and play anybody's tune. He made paintings in the style of Rembrandt, Rubens, Watteau, the Dutchmen Ruysdael, van Goyen and Cuyp, Claude, Poussin, Canaletto – the list goes on. No other great master had demonstrated this chameleon tendency with such seriousness even to the slightest degree."

=== The idealised landscape ===
Sir Joshua Reynolds articulated the academic rules for the ideal landscape in British art theory, differentiating it from one that aimed to represent the real one, which at the time was called a topographical landscape. Believing the ideal landscape to be artistically superior as it can capture the "truths of Nature", he cited the works of Lorrain as the preeminent model. (Note: In Reynolds own words: "Claude Lorrain [...] was convinced, that taking nature as he found it seldom produced beauty. His pictures are a composition of various draughts which he had previously made from various beautiful scenes and prospects [which] are selected by the Painter and the Poet to make a part of the composition of their ideal Landscape.") He taught that by combining the finest elements seen in multiple locations and under the most harmonious light, an artist could transcend the random conditions of actual landscapes.

During his travels, Turner avidly sketched to capture every detail that caught his attention so that he could later combine them to achieve these ideal landscapes. In Turner's own words: "To select, combine and concentrate that which is beautiful in nature and admirable in art is [...] the business of the landscape painter." (Note: As he was providing this suggestion, he was at the same time relegating Claude's paintings to "pictures made up of bits, but pictures of bits." In Gowing's analysis of this extract of his lecture on landscape painting, Turner was stating that "visual realism was pleased with simple subjects. Turner, generally speaking, was not, and the character of his art was due to the fact.")

In his obituary of Turner, the British writer Peter Cunningham acknowledged a widespread consensus that Turner had fully achieved Reynolds' teachings, writing that: "[it is] recognised by the wiser few as a noble attempt at lifting landscape art out of the tame insipidities ... [and] evinced for the first time that mastery of effect for which he is now justly celebrated".

Turner's body of work received its first comprehensive theoretical assessment in John Ruskin's multi-volume treatise Modern Painters (1843–1860). Building on Reynolds' teachings, Ruskin established a framework that considered the genre of landscape painting not merely as trivial decoration or superficial mimicry, but as an honest study of nature and human truth. In his view, Turner accomplished a truthful interpretation of how our minds and eyes experience light, mist, and the sublime power of the world, (Note: The groundwork for "Modern Painters" was laid when a 17-years-old Ruskin wrote a furious letter to defend Turner against an scathing criticism by John Eagles of Turner's Juliet and her Nurse (1836), describing the painting as "a strange jumble ... thrown higgledy-piggledy together, streaked blue and pink and thrown into a flour-tub.") describing him as the artist who could most "stirringly and truthfully measure the moods of Nature". He went so far as to elevate Turner's representation of nature into a moral and spiritual category. (Note: Turner sarcastically said of his friend Ruskin's efforts: "He knows a great deal more about my pictures than I do. He puts things into my head, and points out meanings in them I never intended.")

=== The challenge of the sublime ===
In the mid-18th century, the philosopher Edmund Burke formally defined the aesthetic concept of "the sublime", in opposition to "the beautiful". He considered the sublime to be antithetical to the classical concept of beauty, in the same way that darkness is the opposite of light.

According to Burke:

The passion caused by the great and sublime in nature, when those causes operate most powerfully, is astonishment; and astonishment is that state of the soul, in which all its motions are suspended, with some degree of horror. In this case the mind is so entirely filled with its object, that it cannot entertain any other, nor by consequence, reason.

Burke observed that one way to experience the sublime was witnessing nature's overwhelming power, vastness, and danger. He argued that the sublime in nature was virtually unrepresentable on canvas, and was primarily the domain of poetry.

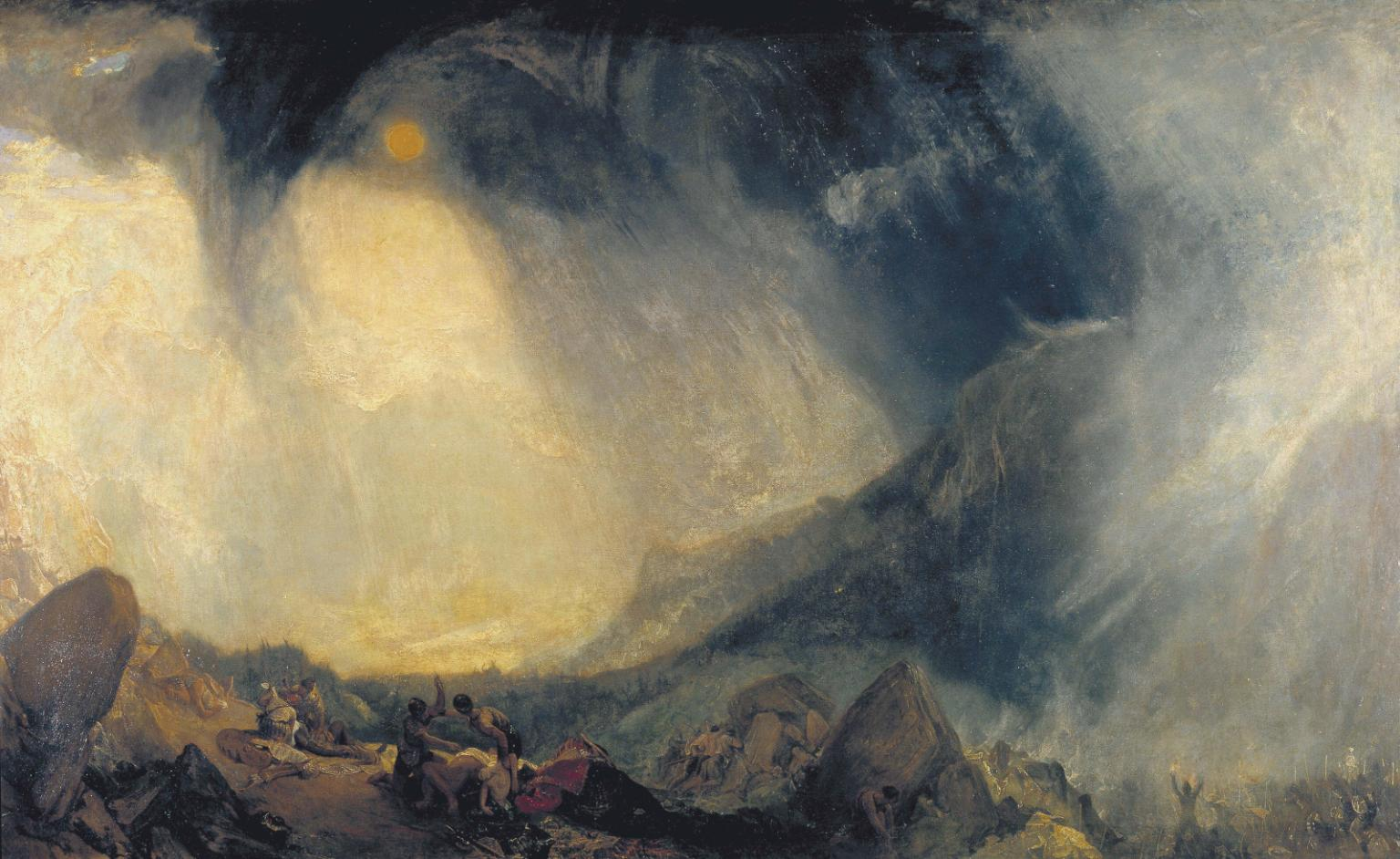
Snow Storm: Hannibal and his Army Crossing the Alps (1812). Tate Britain, London.

In his groundbreaking work Snow Storm: Hannibal and his Army Crossing the Alps (1812), Turner demonstrated that painting was able to convey the terror of the sublime. The clash of Hannibal's army with Alpine tribes is dwarfed by a terrifying display of natural forces as both are engulfed by a dark storm cloud. Hannibal represents Turner's first use of a large vortex, a composition he would repeat in several subsequent paintings that aimed to capture the essence of the sublime. According to Wilton, after decades of debate over whether painting could capture the essence of the sublime, Turner finally "grasped the sublime bull by the horns" and ended that discussion.

=== Elevating landscape painting ===
In the long-established hierarchy of genres, history painting and portraits occupied the first and second places, respectively. The academic consensus was that landscape paintings had little to say about the human experience and therefore, provided no philosophical or intellectual content; (Note: Henry Fuseli despectively described topographical landscape as: "...a kind of map-work [and the] tame delineation of a given spot... [the uninteresting] enumeration of hill and dale, clumps of trees, shrubs, water, meadows, cottages and houses.") the genre was relegated to an artisanal rank. To counter this view, Turner worked 12 years in a print series of landscapes which he called the Liber Studiorum.

As the prints were categorised, along with "History" he differentiated the "Pastoral" from the "Epic or Elevated Pastoral", to support his conviction that landscape could carry the gravitas and philosophical depth of history painting.

His groundbreaking Hannibal was the first demonstration that the visual medium could articulate the Burkean sublime. The painting depicted a well-known historical event, while at the same time, it synthesised poetry, moral philosophy, and complex allegory in a canvas in which natural scenery – the terrifying Alpine blizzard – was the predominant motif.

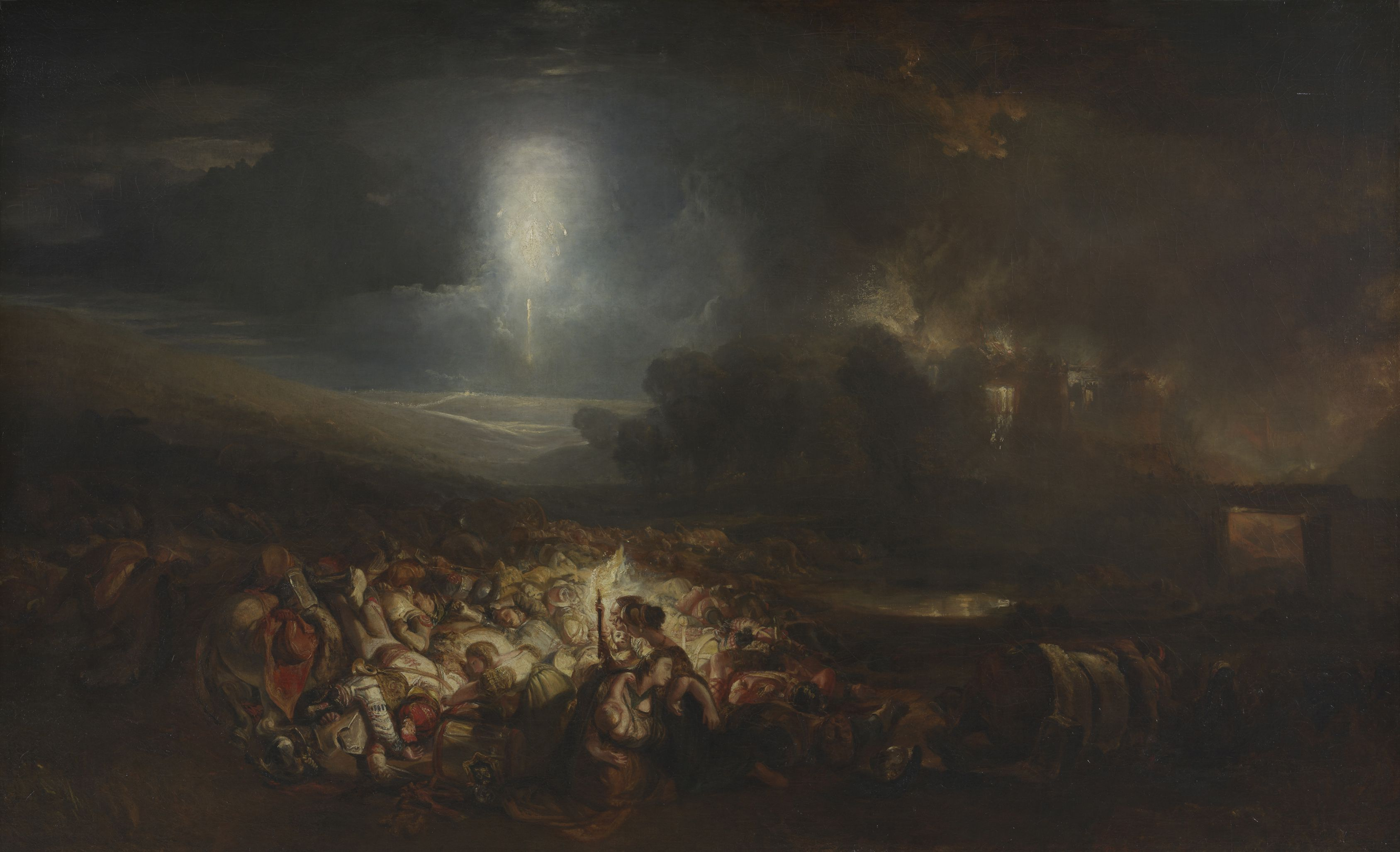
J.M.W. Turner, The Field of Waterloo (1818). Tate Britain, London.

Another example is The Field of Waterloo (1818), in which rather than depicting a scene of valiant victory as other British painters had done to celebrate Napoleon's defeat, Turner presents us with a battlefield landscape littered with corpses – an indictment of the horrors of war. (Note: Other painters at the time had produced the age-old scenes of military glory in celebration of the British victory. In The Field of Waterloo Turner conveys a powerful anti-war message. Turner painted the horrors of war, anticipating the use of painting as a vehicle for social criticism by a century.) That same year, an art critic recognised his mastery in combining painting and poetry: "If there is one man in existence whose works possess the quality [of poetry] in a higher degree than another, it is Turner." (Note: Literary Chronicle, 22 June 1818, cited in:)

== Themes ==
=== Architectural watercolours ===
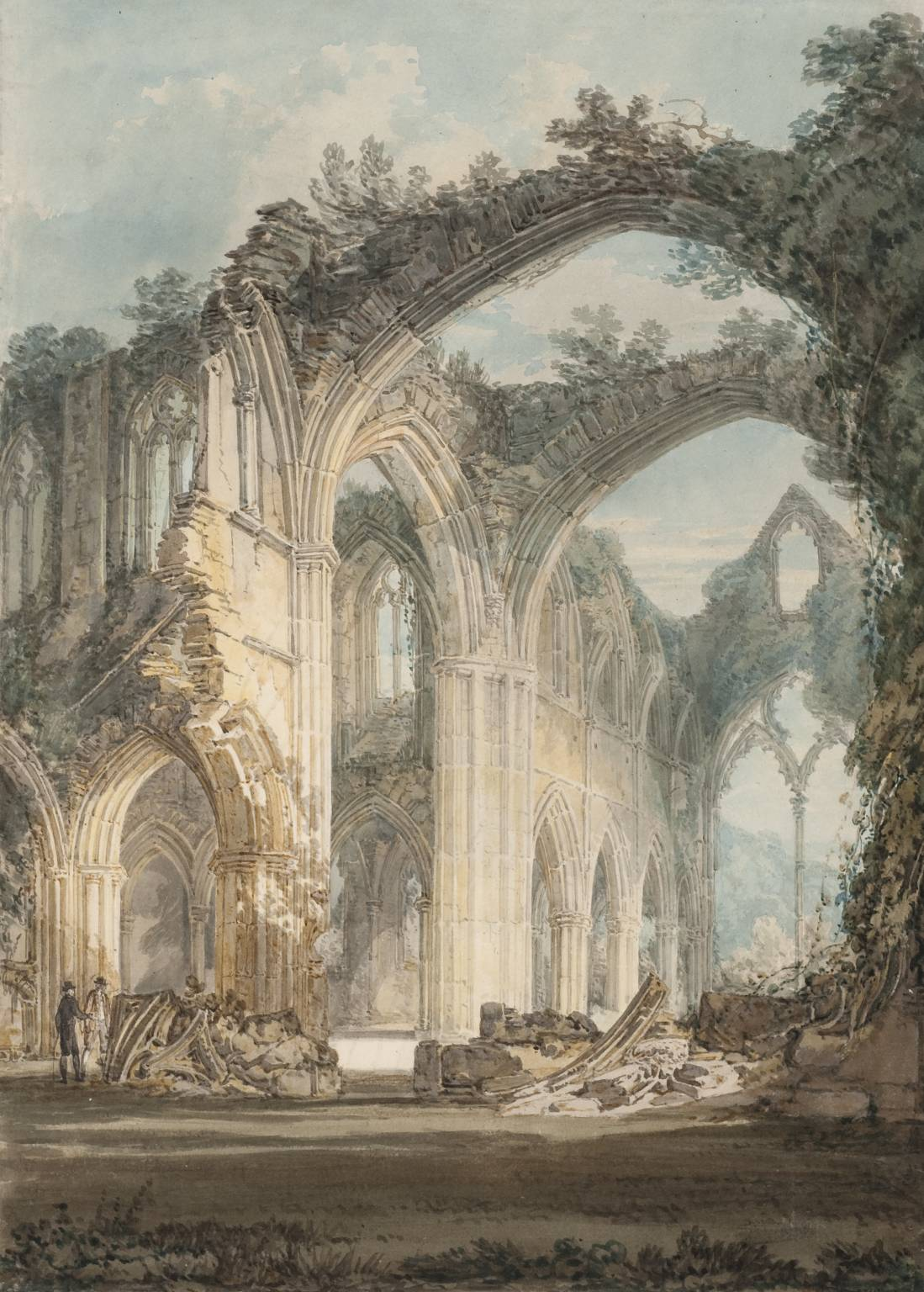
J.M.W. Turner, Tintern Abbey: The Chancel and Crossing Looking towards the East Window (1794). Tate Britain, London

Turner's early works, such as Tintern Abbey (1795), were mainly focused on architectural watercolours, which made use of his superior drawing skills. Turner's paintings and sketches are bold and fresh, as he was always seeking novel ways to capture what he was seeing.

=== Classical scenes ===
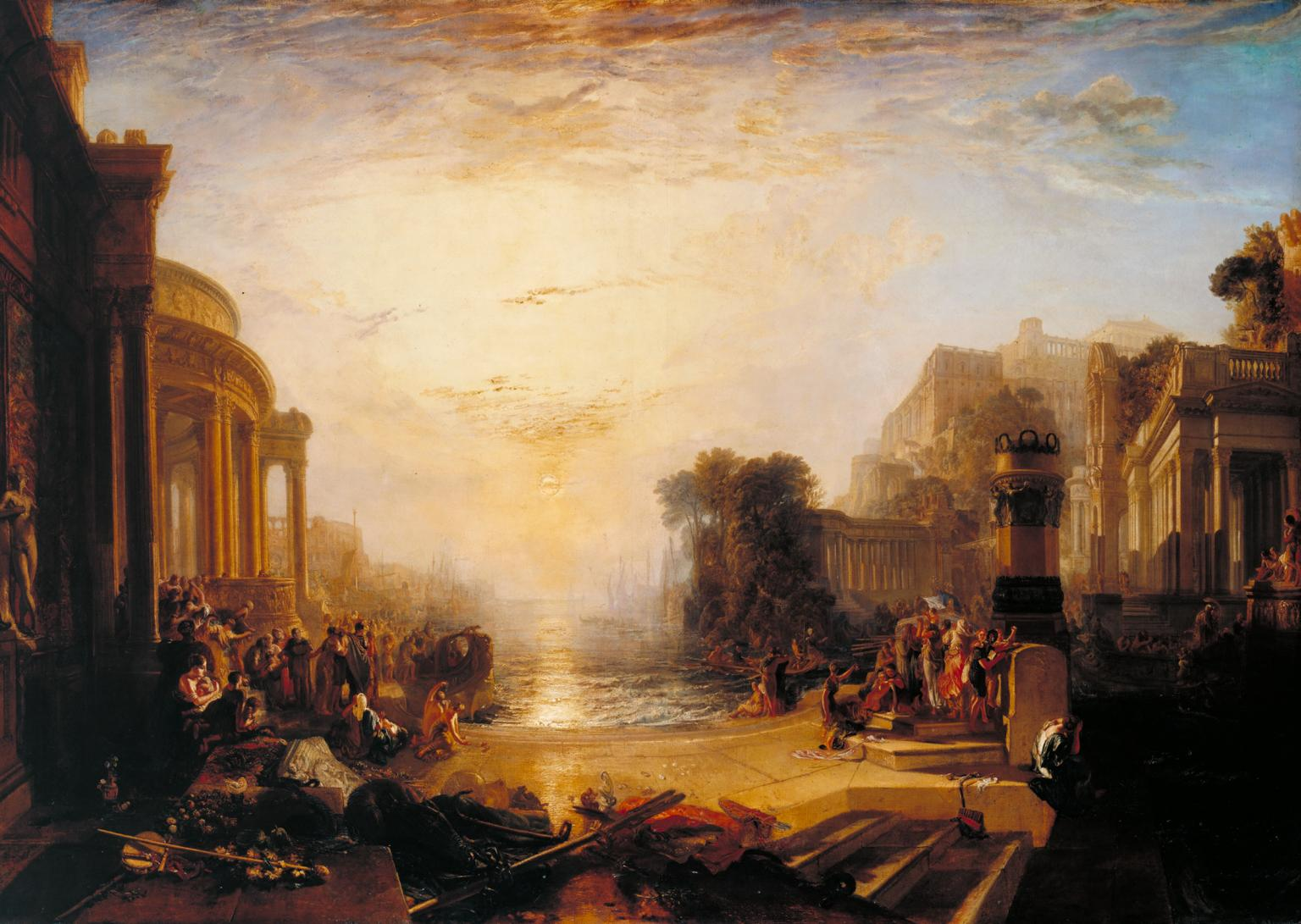
J.M.W. Turner, The Decline of the Carthaginian Empire (1817). Tate Britain, London

Several of Turner's most significant classical paintings were conceived as a critique of imperial ambition, drawing on antiquity to warn contemporary Britain against commercial greed and complacency as its empire expanded. Turner inverted traditional history painting by subordinating the human actors; rather than placing large figures in the foreground, he reduced the historical characters, surrounding them with landscape, classical architecture, and vast skies.

Carthage was a recurring subject that he depicted at least seven times, viewing it as the paradigm of a great empire doomed to decay due to hubris and unchecked ambition. To chart its civilisational arc over an extended span of time, Turner painted pendant pairs; he followed Dido with The Decline of the Carthaginian Empire (1817). In these works he used pictorial elements to convey hidden meaning, for example contrasting the sunrise of imperial ascendance with the sunset of its decline, contrasting busy docks with solitary tombs, as in Dido; or by scattering luxury goods to symbolise the decadence that precedes imperial ruin, as in The Decline.

His classical paintings also include allegories and moral teachings, for example the relationship between beauty and mortality in The Bay of Baiae, with Apollo and the Sibyl (1823), the preference for luxury and hedonism over eternal life in The Golden Bough (1834), and the death of empires in Ancient Rome – Agrippina Landing with the Ashes of Germanicus (1839).

=== The picturesque landscape ===
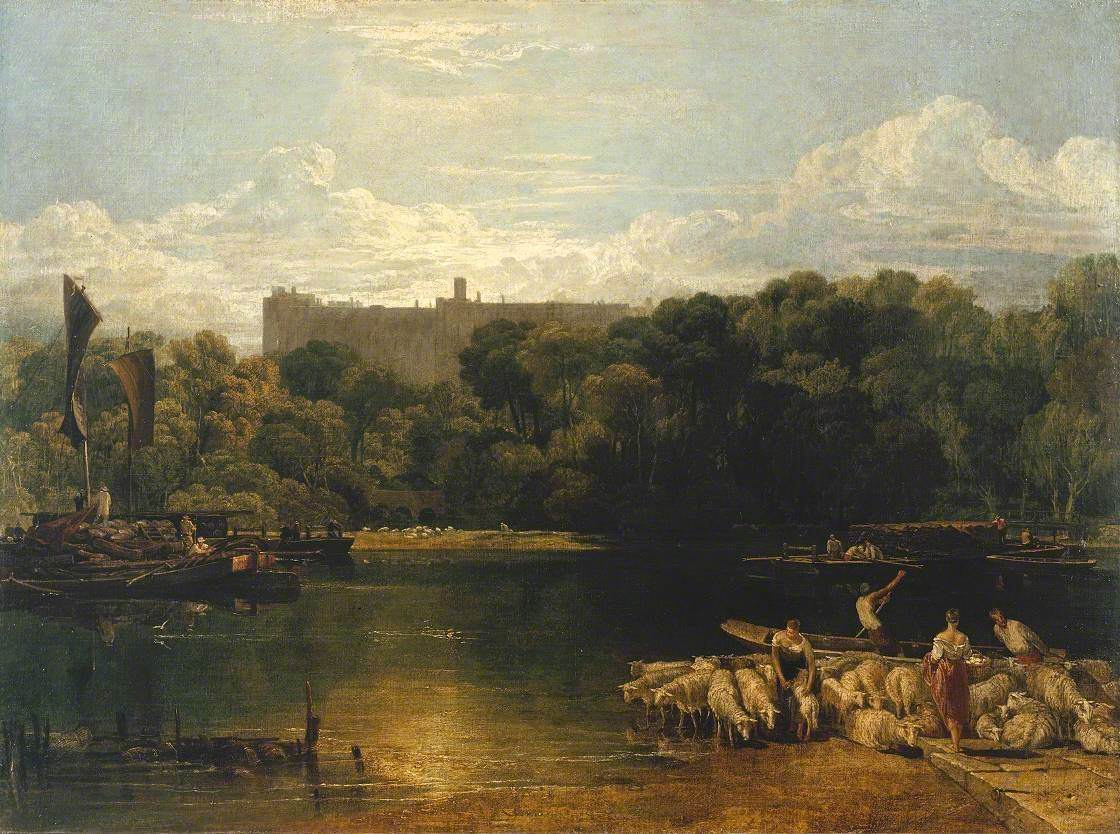
J.M.W. Turner, Windsor Castle from the Thames (1805). Petworth House, Sussex.

Often overshadowed by his more dramatic landscape works, the pastoral and picturesque side of Turner is as notable. A testament to his flexibility as an artist, he continued exploring expressionist techniques while producing traditional picturesque landscapes, such as Windsor Castle from the Thames (1805), Scene in Derbyshire (1827) and The Fountain of Indolence (1834). The majority of his pastoral landscapes were made in watercolour, based on his sketches, and at times en plein air – a practice that had been in use in Britain since the 17th century. Although finished works were painted in his studio, his picturesque skies and weather conditions showed a naturalism that took advantage of decades of field observation, as captured in his hundreds of sketchbooks.

Beyond Britain, his picturesque practice spanned Western Europe, including surveys along the Loire and Seine, German rivers, and luminous Alpine vistas across Switzerland. He was influenced by David Teniers the Younger (1610–1690).

Landscapes in different styles
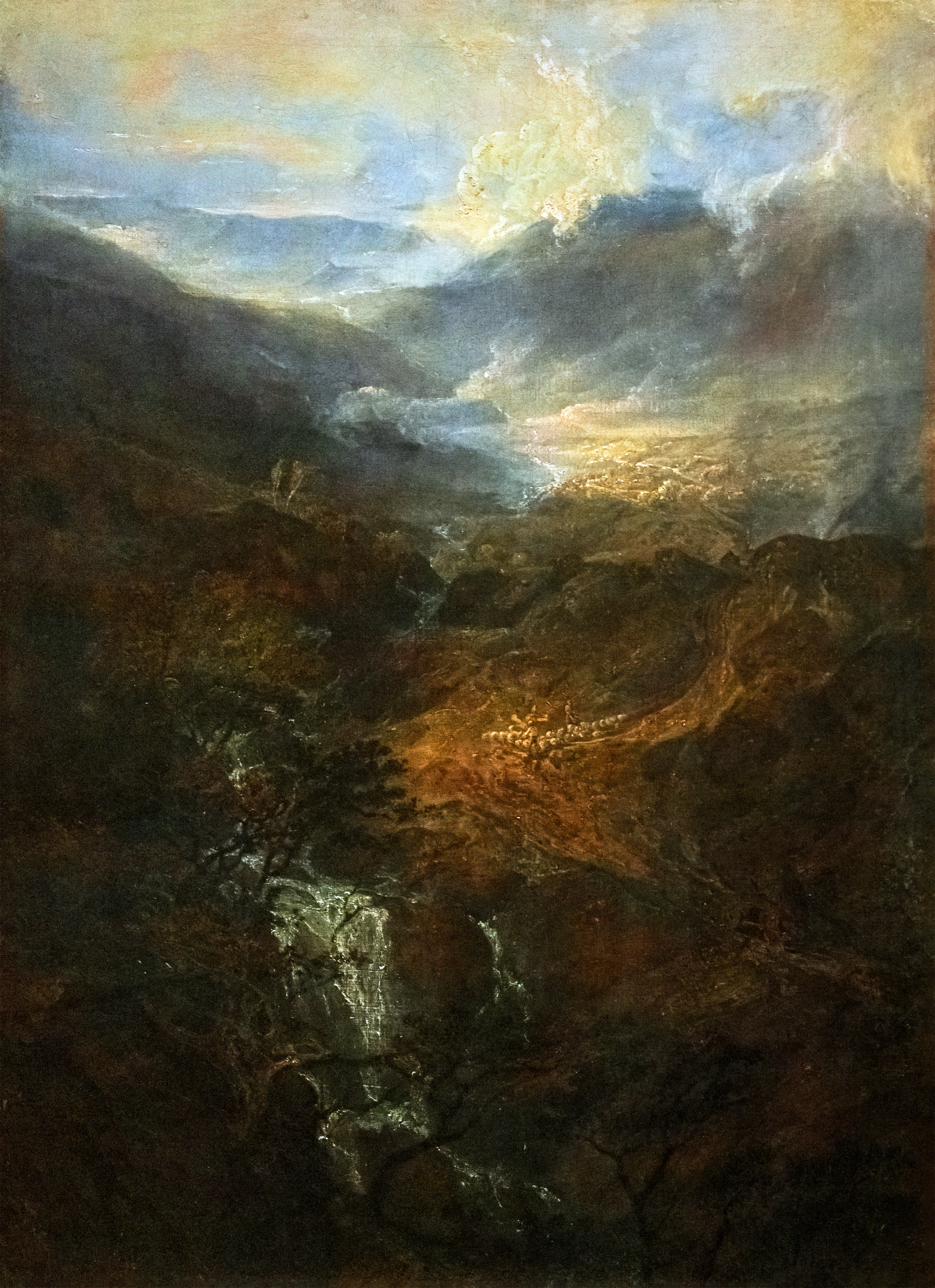
Morning Among the Coniston Fells (1798). Tate Britain, London.

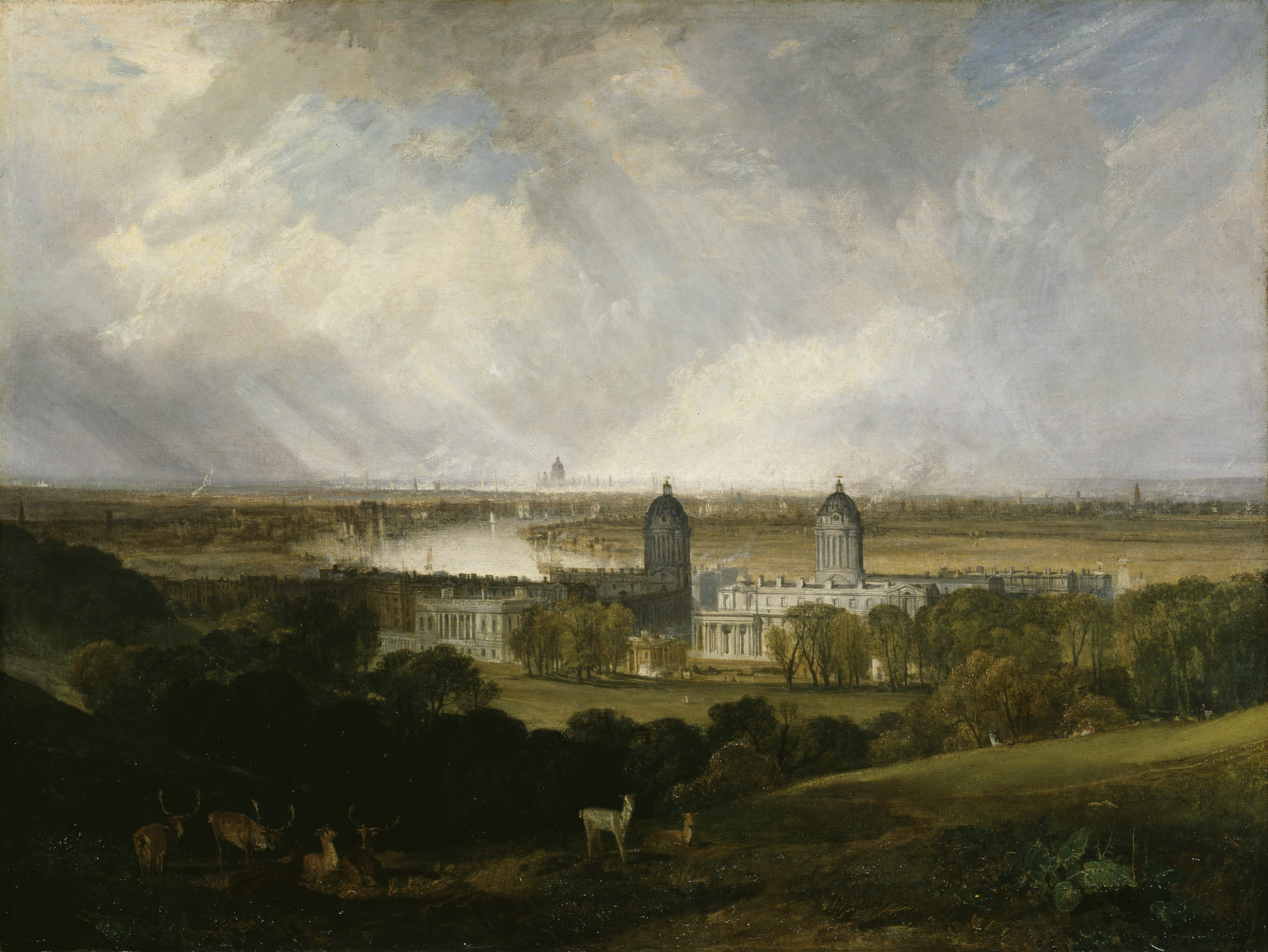
London from Greenwich Park (1809). Tate Britain, London.

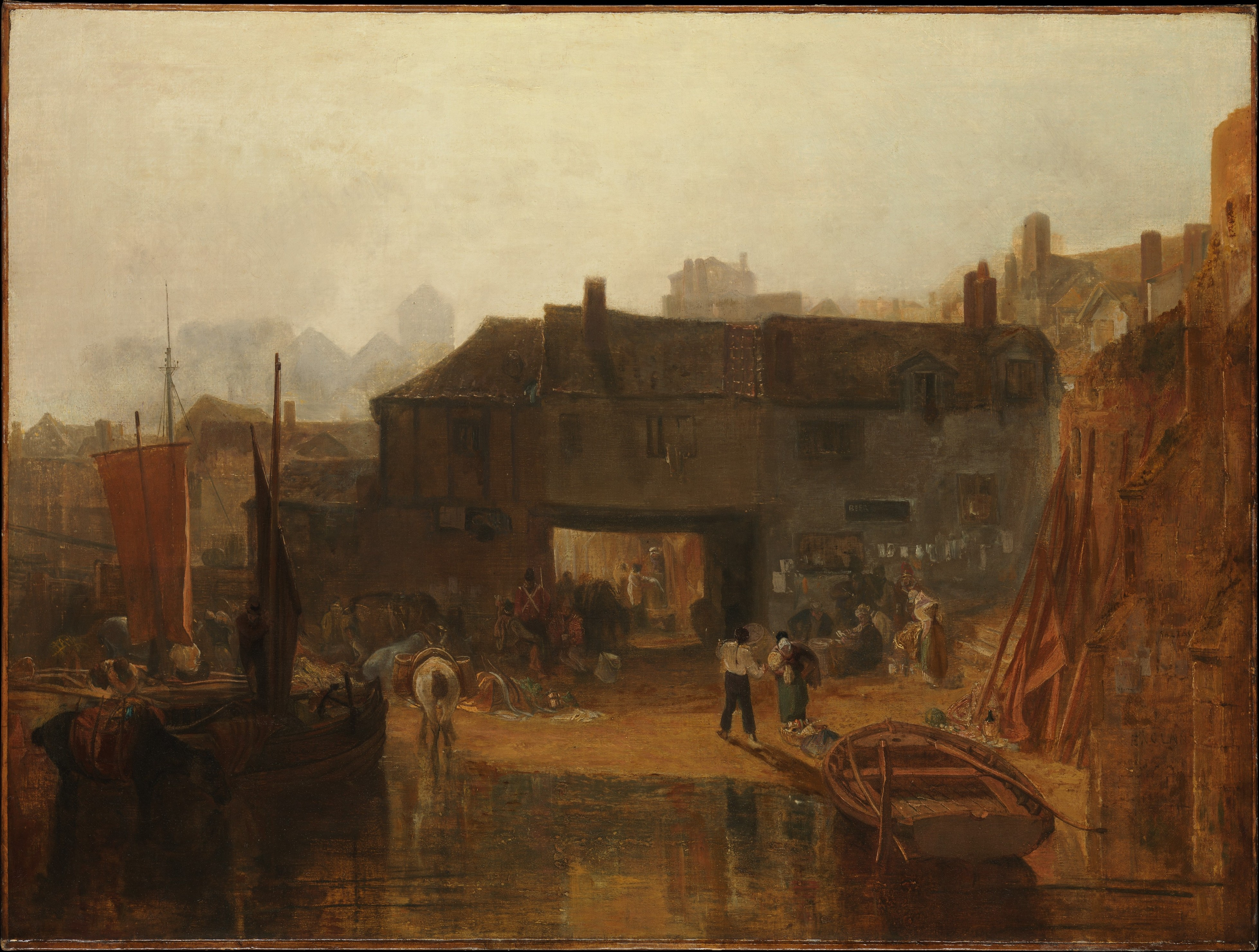
Saltash with the Water Ferry (1811). Metropolitan Museum of Art, New York.

=== The human landscape ===
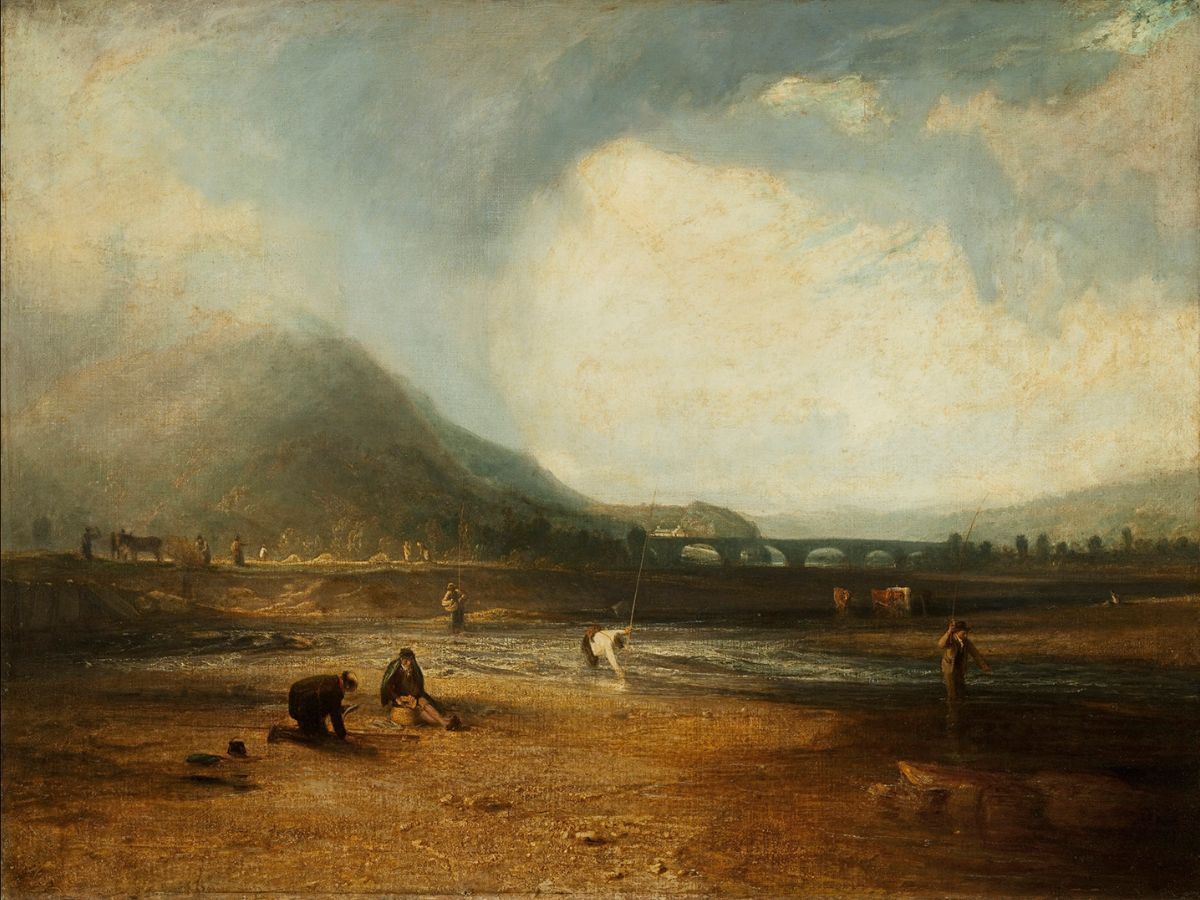
J.M.W. Turner, The Trout Stream (1809). Taft Museum of Art, Cincinnati

Rather than serving as mere pictorial records of nature, many of Turner's landscapes and seascapes present human narratives by depicting figures directly engaged with their surroundings and he generally populated his picturesque scenes with ordinary, working-class figures.

This is most striking in paintings showing nature at its most violent, such as in The Shipwreck (1805), where struggling sailors and passengers are helpless before the raging sea.

According to Shanes:

Turner was most decidedly not just a landscape and marine artist, [...] equally he was a painter of mankind. As such he afforded us profound insights into the nature of the human condition, [depicting] all the doings of man, [including] trading, carting, sailing, whaling, imprisoning, electing, gawping, scurrying, celebrating, bickering, squabbling, building, destroying, fighting, suffering, drowning, dying and mourning.

=== Seascapes ===
Turner was particularly fascinated by the violent power of the sea during his whole career; he exhibited Fishermen at Sea (1796) at the Royal Academy in his early twenties while Seascape: Folkestone was painted in 1850, the year before his death. His motifs included Dutch-inspired seascapes, shipwrecks, and naval battles. According to Riding and Johns, marine painting "was being reinvented, and Turner played the leading role in that process."

==== Early Dutch influence ====
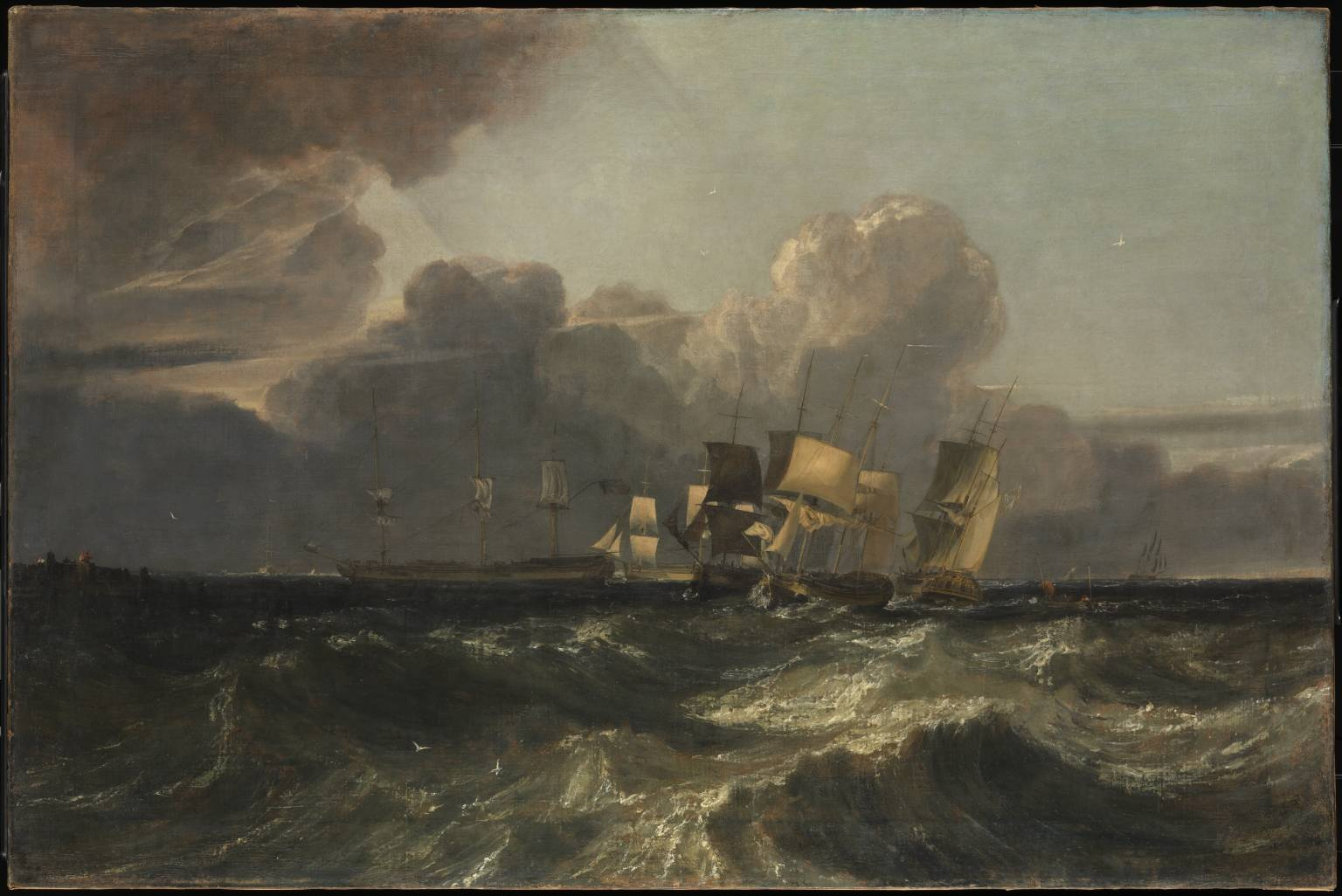
Ships Bearing up for Anchorage (1802). Petworth House, Sussex.

Turner’s early marine paintings were inspired by his study of 17th-century Dutch masters, notably Willem van de Velde the Younger, Ludolf Bakhuizen, and Rembrandt. In contrast to the static compositions and flat horizon lines in these works, his desire to capture "the qualities and causes of things" made him observe the dynamics of waves and the effect of wind on the ocean surface in order to depict them more realistically. His ability to represent a dynamic ocean can already be seen in his early oil painting Dutch Boats in a Gale (1801); compared to Van de Velde's crisp waves, Turner's foam-capped waves seem to be driven by real physical forces.

Throughout his career, Turner returned repeatedly to Dutch marine models. In 1802, for his debut as a full Royal Academician, he prepared two major Dutch-style seascapes: Fishermen Upon a Lee-Shore in Squally Weather and Ships Bearing Up for Anchorage. Decades later, during the 1830s, he produced a group of historical homages revisiting Jan van Goyen and 17th-century Dutch naval history, including Helvoetsluys (1832), Van Tromp’s Shallop (1832), and The Prince of Orange Landing at Torbay (1832).

Seascapes
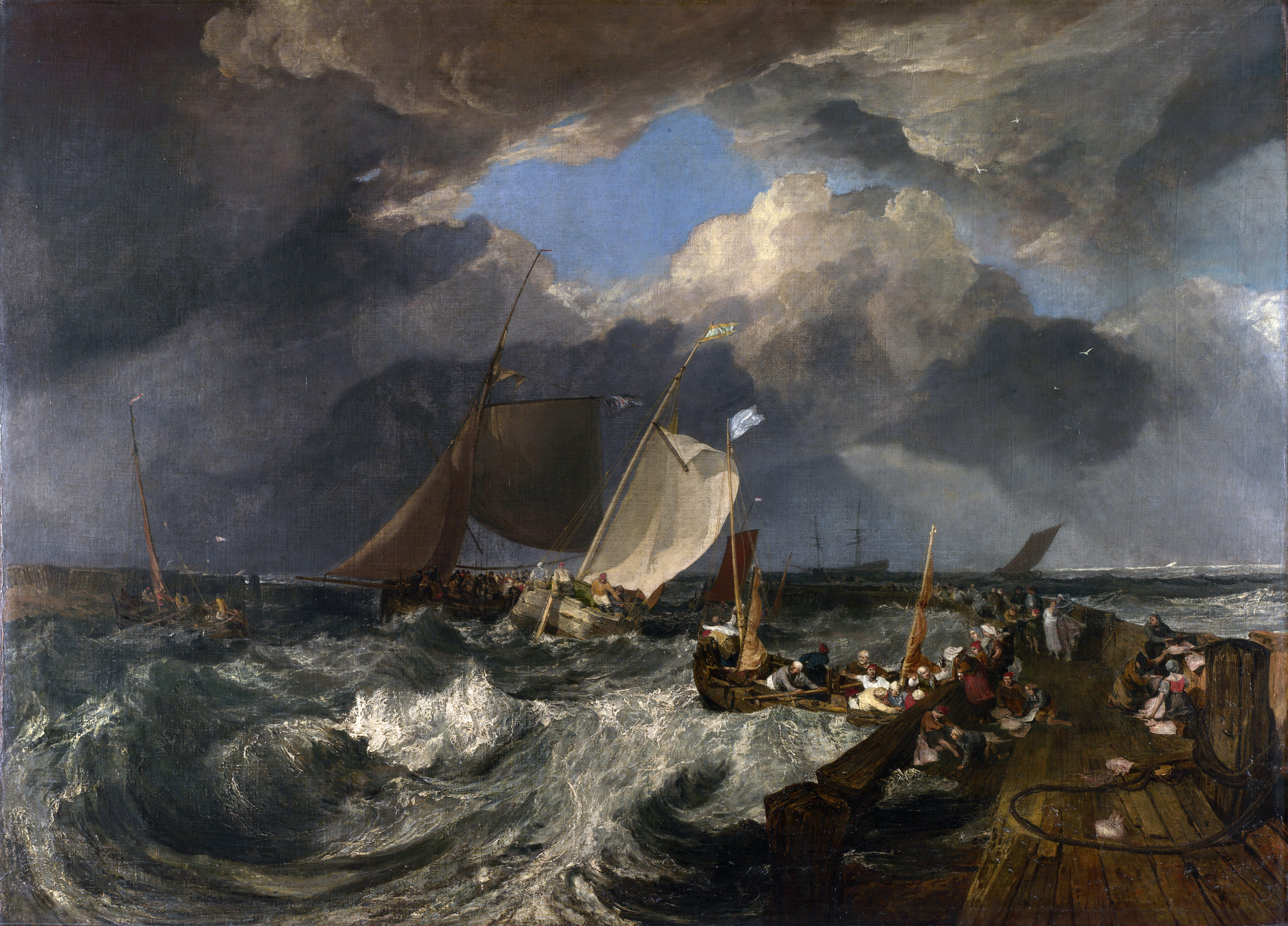
Calais Pier (1803). National Gallery, London.

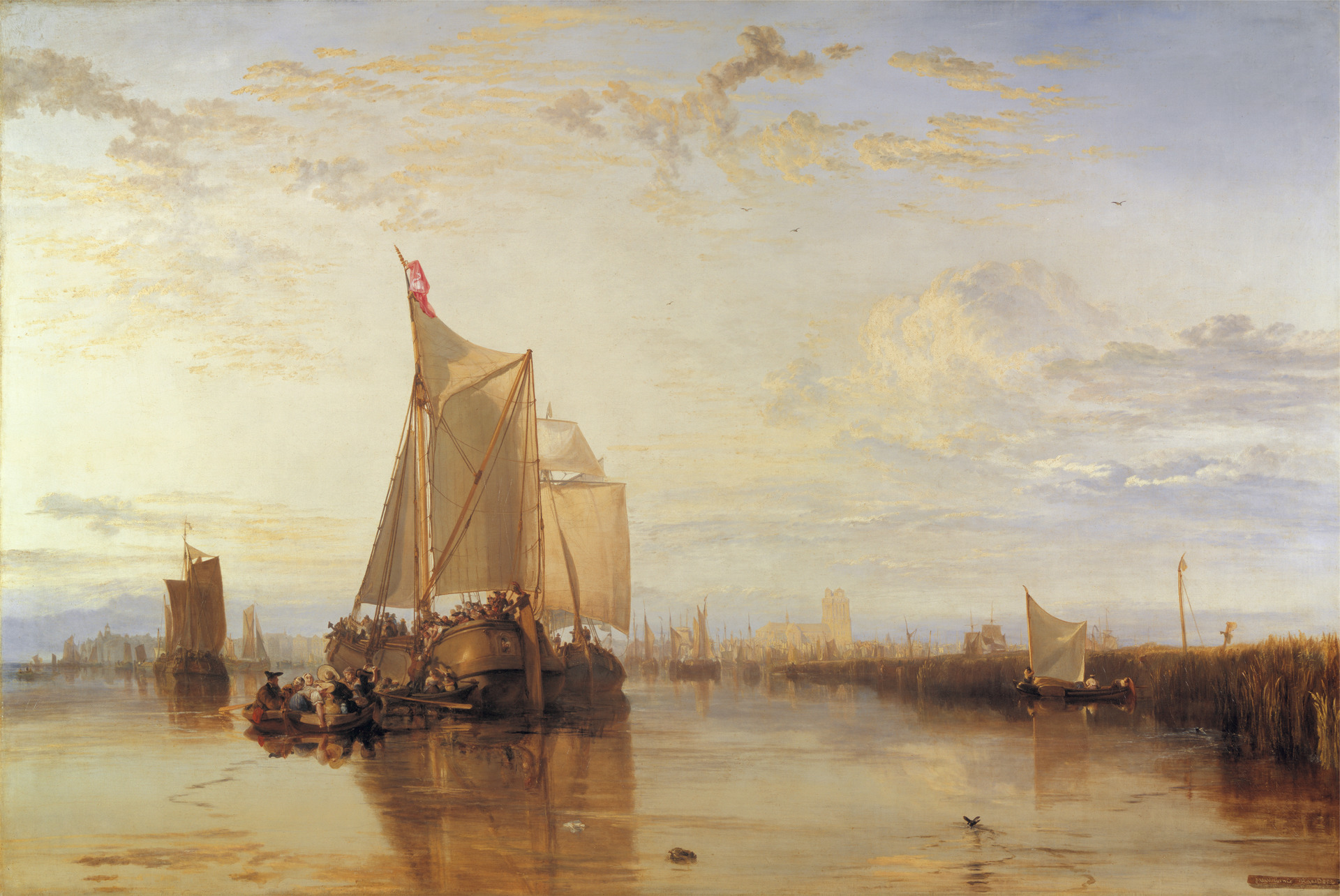
Dort or Dordrecht: The Dort packet-boat from Rotterdam becalmed (1818). Yale Center for British Art, New Haven.

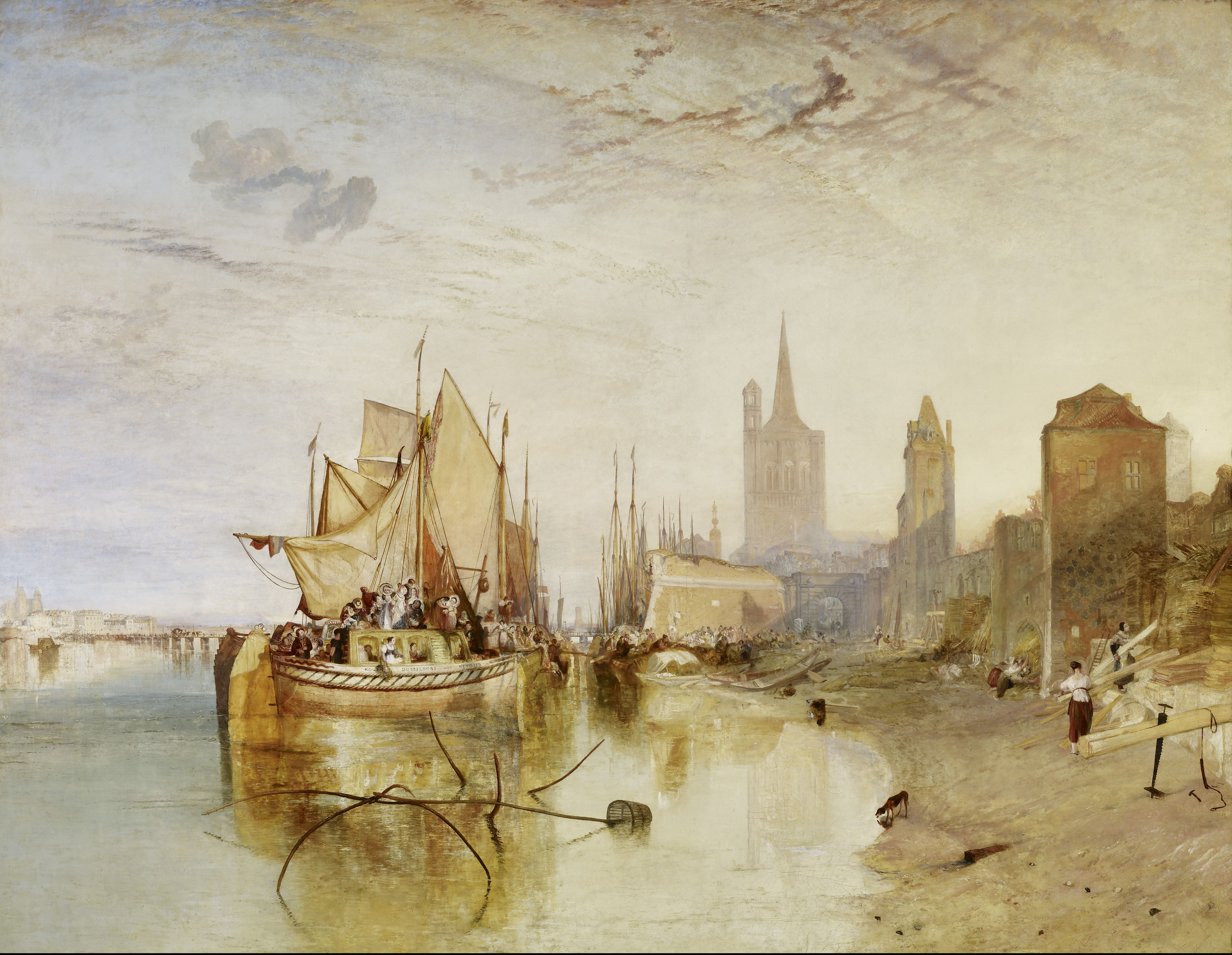
Cologne, the Arrival of a Packet Boat in the Evening (1826). Frick Collection, New York.

==== Shipwrecks ====
Between 1803 and 1810, Turner painted a series of three maritime disasters on large canvases that established his treatment of the sublime in seascapes: Calais Pier (1803), The Shipwreck (1805), and The Wreck of a Transport Ship (c. 1810). Later in his career, Turner shifted his objective from achieving a sublime representation of a shipwreck into moral critique. In The Female Convict Ship: Women and Children Abandoned in a Gale (c. 1835), he condemns the decision to let female convicts and children drown by refusing them rescue, and in Slavers Throwing Overboard the Dead and Dying – Typhoon Coming On (1840), the practice of throwing into the waves captives destined to be sold as slaves so as to be able to obtain insurance payouts.

==== Naval battles ====
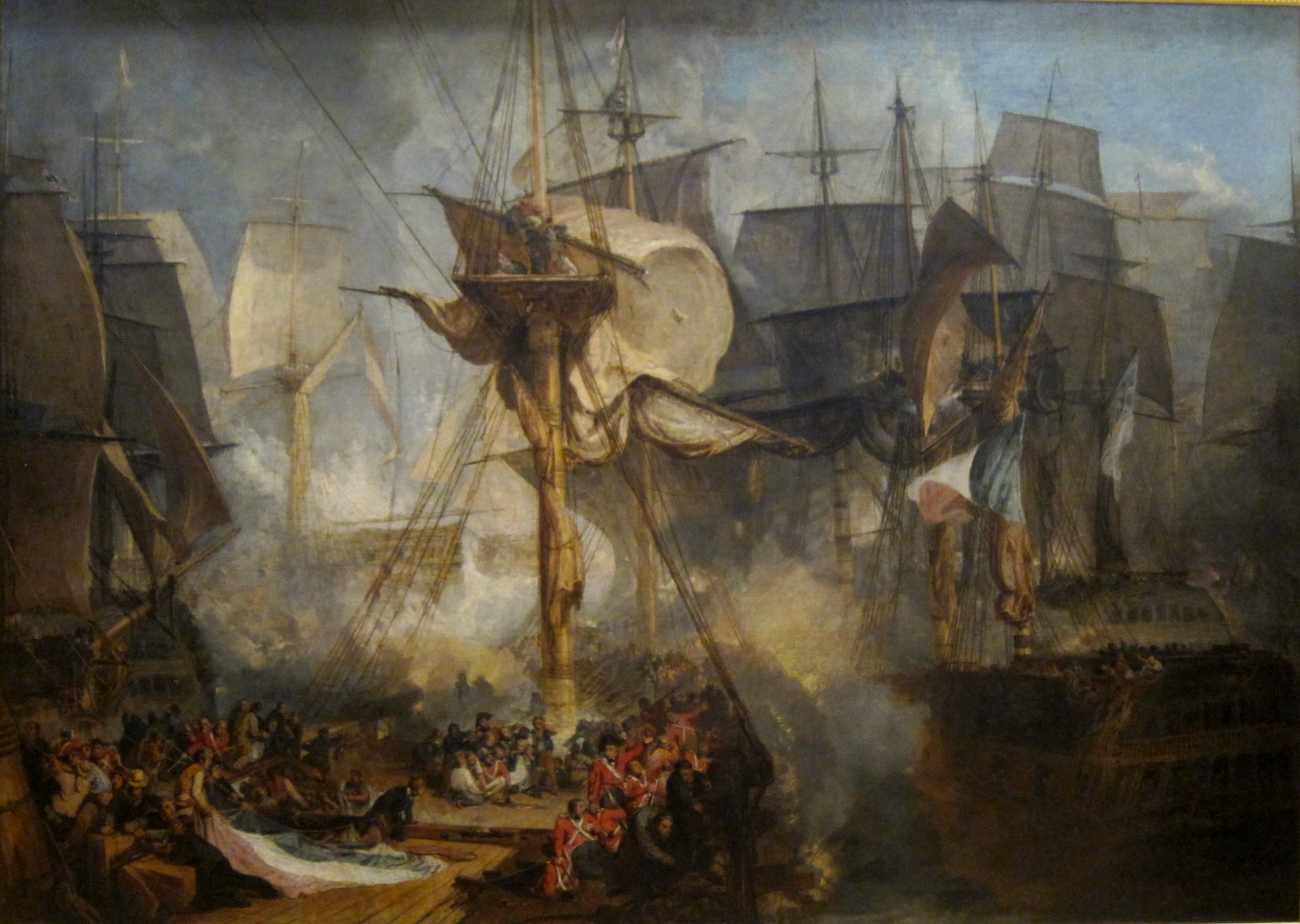
J.M.W. Turner, The Battle of Trafalgar, as Seen from the Mizen Starboard Shrouds of the Victory (1808). Tate Britain, London.

Turner’s naval combat works present themes of imperial ambition, human suffering, and moral allegory. He wanted to raise awareness of the human costs of war, using marine painting as a vehicle for political and moral commentary.

He made several large paintings showing the naval victories of the British Royal Navy during the Napoleonic Wars. Two of them depict the Battle of Trafalgar (1805) in which the British navy – led by Vice-Admiral Nelson, who died during the battle – defeated a combined fleet of the French and Spanish navies. In his first version, Battle of Trafalgar, as Seen from the Mizen Starboard Shrouds of the Victory (1808), Turner depicted the confusion and chaos of a realistic battle, which broke the norms of marine compositions and was not well received by contemporary viewers.

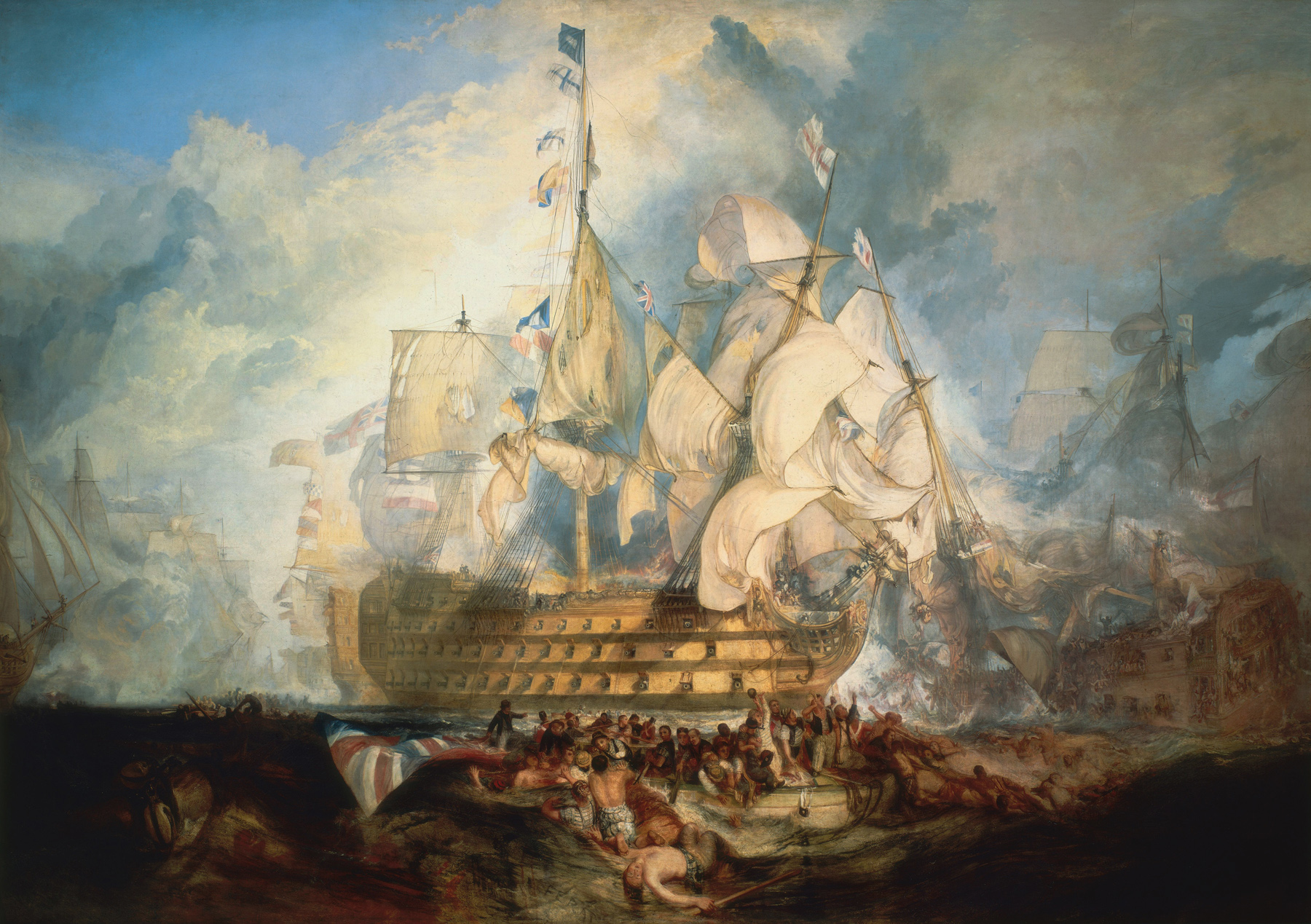
J.M.W. Turner, The Battle of Trafalgar (1822), National Maritime Museum, Greenwich.

Commissioned by King George IV for St. James palace, in The Battle of Trafalgar (1822–1824) Turner decided to convey the tragic price of military victory; the foreground of the painting shows blood and floating corpses, which departed from the heroic depictions of a naval battle that were customary at the time. In addition, he combined four events that occurred at different times, which was unorthodox at the time for this genre. Not surprisingly, the painting was not to the king's liking and was not hung in the palace as intended. (Note: It was sent to the Royal Naval Hospital at Greenwich.)

=== The industrial revolution ===
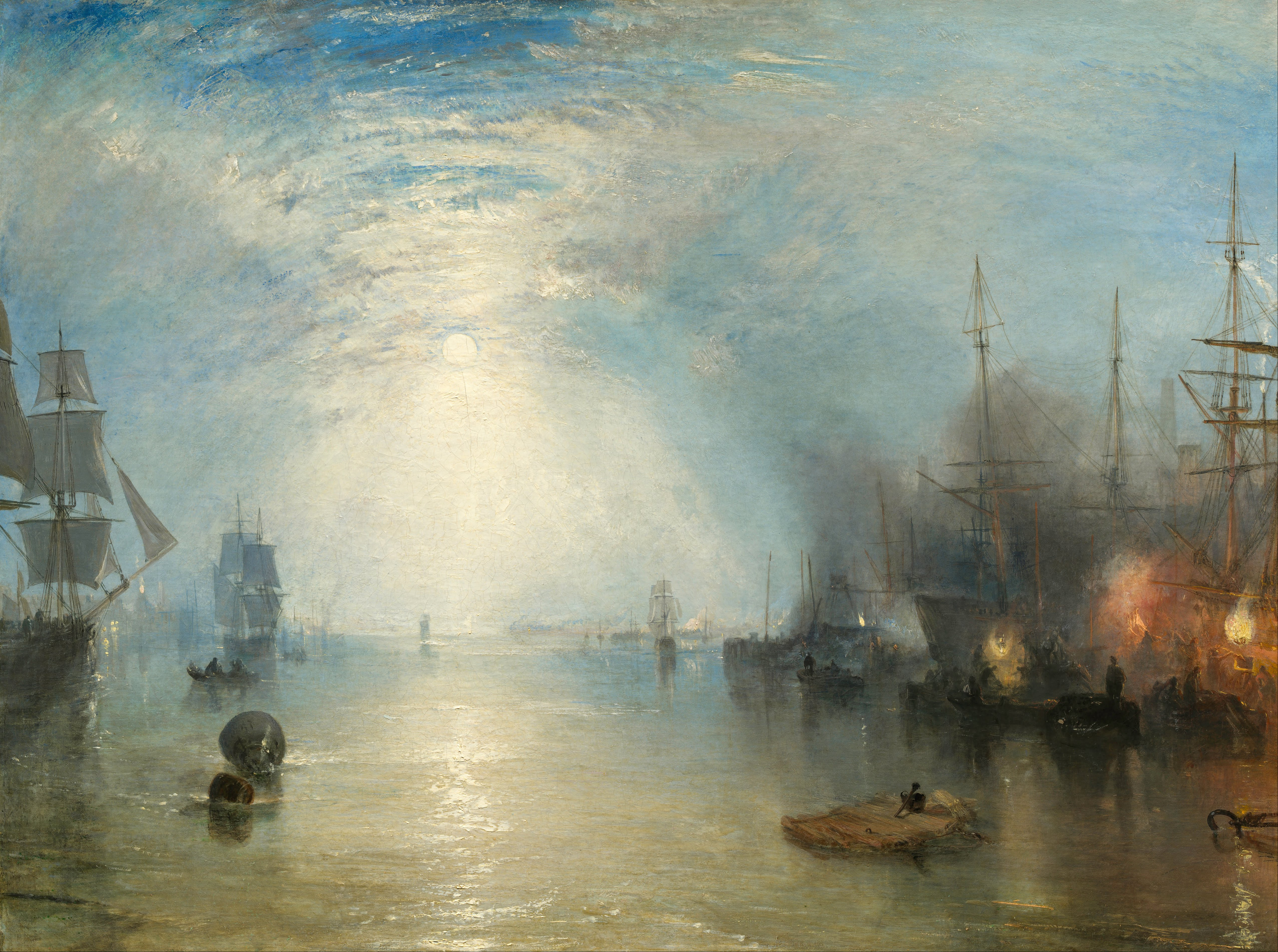
J.M.W. Turner, Keelmen Heaving in Coals by Moonlight (1835). National Gallery of Art, Washington.

Turner was born in the age of sailing ships and horse wagons and witnessed their replacement by steam ships and locomotives. While painters of his generation like Constable kept painting the English countryside, Turner's curiosity drove him to discover the beauty in the iron, fire and smoke (Note: Turner was fascinated with fiery light, as can be seen in Slave Ship (1840) and The Burning of the Houses of Lords and Commons (c. 1834–35)) of this new industrial "landscape".

In Keelmen Heaving in Coals by Moonlight (1835) Turner depicts the port of Newcastle in the Tyne River at night. He has reinterpreted the composition of lines converging towards the source of light of a classic Claude painting, replacing the ancient buildings and historical figures with the furnaces and industrial workers of modern Britain.

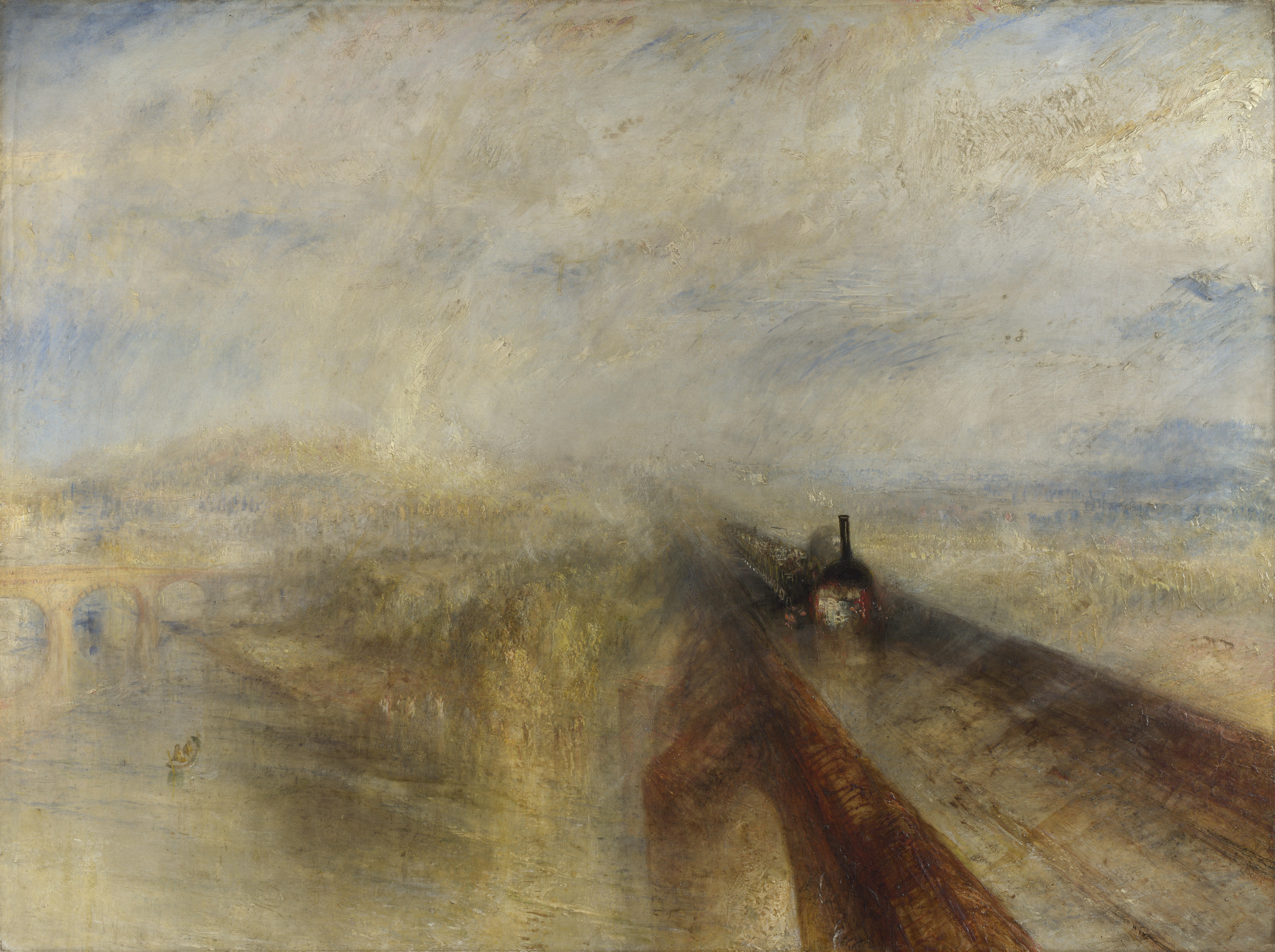
J.M.W. Turner, Rain, Steam and Speed – The Great Western Railway (1844). National Gallery, London.

In 1844, when he was 69 years old, he painted one of his canonical masterworks, Rain, Steam and Speed – The Great Western Railway, which features a train hurtling across the canvas over a railway bridge. The objects are barely recognisable, as his objective was to convey the – as yet very novel – sensation of speed.

Turner did not view industrial progress as the enemy of art, which allowed him to discover a new kind of beauty: the sublime of the machine age. As Shanes explains:

Here was a painter who stood firmly within the modern industrial epoch in which we now all live and still perceived the last vestiges of the pre-industrial world that lingered all around him. [...] Among many other things he made it his business to capture both the old world order and the brave new world, and to do so with enormous invention and finesse.

=== Unfinished canvases ===
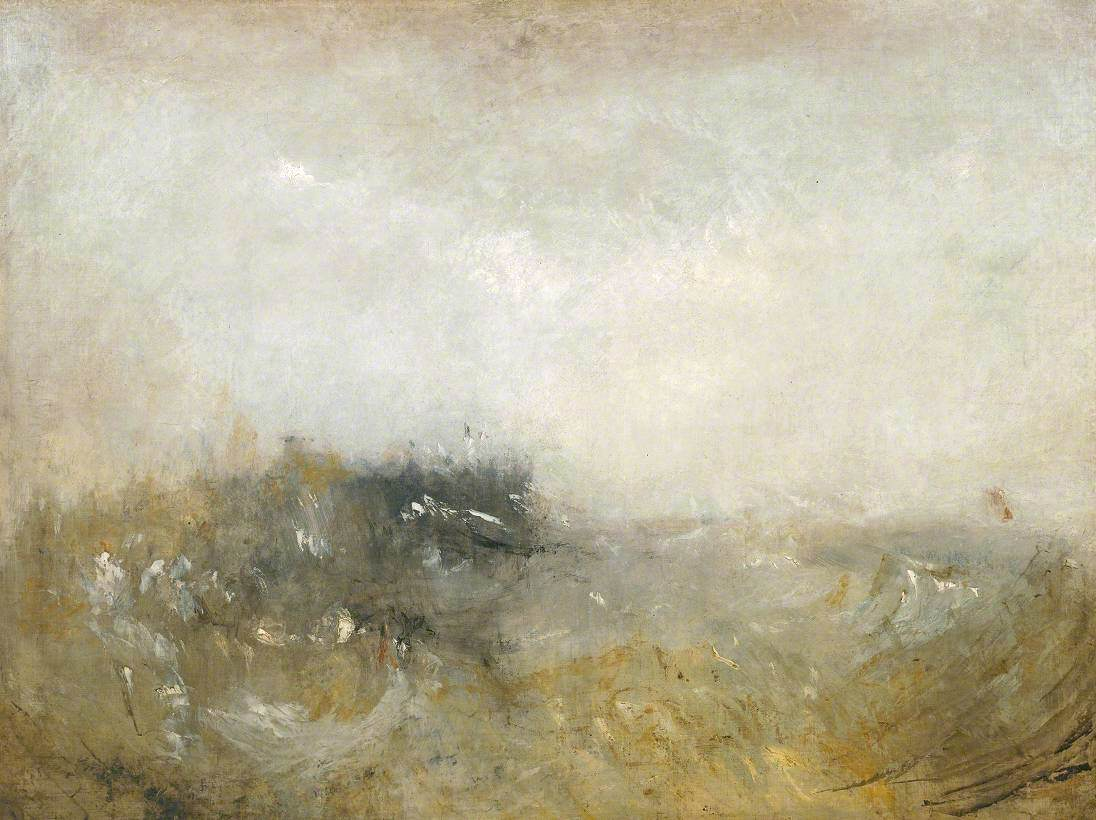
J.M.Turner, Rough Sea (unfinished). (c. 1840–45). Tate Britain, London.

Several of his later works have been erroneously considered early attempts at abstract art, as is the case with Rough Sea (c. 1840–45). According to Shanes, "scholars now largely agree that many were either preparatory canvases to serve as a basis for paintings or just studies for subsequent pictorial paintings." However, in his later works he did simplify shapes and amplified the role of lighting and colour to capture what he considered a more truthful representation of the experience of nature, such as in The Hero of a Hundred Fights, which he presented at the 1847 exhibition of the Academy. (Note: Kenneth Clark, director of the National Gallery from 1934 to 1945, reports that in the late 1940s, he found "rolls of these [abstract Turner paintings] stacked in the cellars of the National Gallery where they were thought to be old tarpaulins, and glimpsing a [Turner] watercolour sheet patching a broken window.")

== Techniques and materials ==
=== Watercolour ===
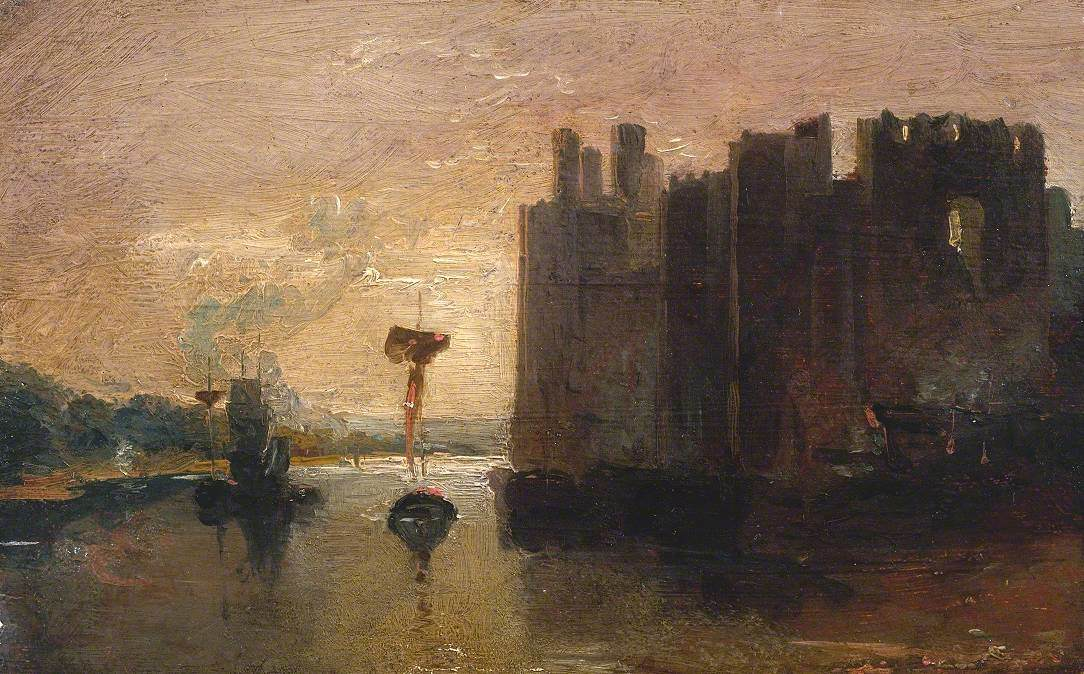
J.M.W. Turner, Caernarvon Castle, watercolour (1799). National Gallery, London

Turner's most important innovations were in watercolour and by the age of 25, he had developed it into a new medium capable of much the same expressive power as oils. According to Wilton, the large watercolour views he made in North Wales such as his depiction of Caernarvon Castle in 1799 "are among the great landscapes of European art".

=== Oil painting ===
Early on, Turner started experimenting with using watercolour techniques for oil painting. Rediscovered in 2025, his first exhibited oil, The Rising Squall, Hot Wells (1792), already shows a 17-year-old Turner applying a diluted oil paint as if it were a watercolour. (Note: The painting was lost until 2024 and discovered in an estate sale.) Experimenting with washes, he discovered that a white base conveys a greater luminosity to oil paintings, which allowed him to produce much brighter colours than had ever been achieved by other landscape painters. Rather than using heavy or complex oils, Turner relied exclusively on a light linseed oil that did not clog, allowing the colours to flow smoothly and thinly, so he could work up the image repeatedly to achieve deep luminosity. To finish his oil paintings, he applied three or four coats of mastic varnish to bear out and enliven the colours, lift the overall tonality, produce a healthy glow, and achieve an airy atmosphere.

=== Pigments ===
Study of his workshop notes, raw materials, studio inventories and laboratory analysis of his paintings reveal that he used newly synthesised pigments, of which he received free samples from the manufacturers. For example, before chrome yellow was distributed to art supply stores, Turner was already experimenting with prototype variants to create his pale suns and bright skies during his "yellow period", yet he also used the commercially available yellow ochre and Naples yellow. For blues, he avoided the expensive natural ultramarine, preferring instead the traditional smalt (ground cobalt glass) and later the newly developed cobalt blue.

His use of traditional pigments included bone black as well as lead white, which he applied using a heavy impasto technique, for example, to give his ocean waves their dynamism. He was selective in his use of reds, using vermilion and Venetian red pigments sparingly. Rather than mixing all pigments directly on the palette, Turner frequently created tones optically by superimposing thin, semi-transparent layers, such as applying blue over brown or ochre to produce an optical green.

Against the advice of contemporary experts to use more durable pigments, Turner used formulations like carmine. Only a few decades after they were painted, Ruskin complained at how quickly his works decayed. Turner was indifferent to posterity and chose materials that looked good when freshly applied. By 1930, there was concern that both his oils as well as his watercolours were fading beyond repair.

=== Colour ===
During the blocking step (Note: The initial step where the artist maps out the basic shapes, layout, and structure of the painting before adding detail.) in oil painting, Turner laid down broad masses of thin paint diluted with non-oily solvents like turpentine. Rather than using traditional 17th-century monochromatic "dead colouring", which used dark, desaturated shades like gray, greenish-gray or brown – thus making the base appear dark – he chose colours directly related to the final lighting of the area to be blocked.

Based on his study of Michael Angelo Rooker's technique during his youth, Turner mixed a single tone at a time and distributed it gradually across the canvas. He progressed from light to dark down a tonal "scale" to establish spatial recession and capture minute gradations.

=== Gallery: Late paintings (1834 – 1850) ===
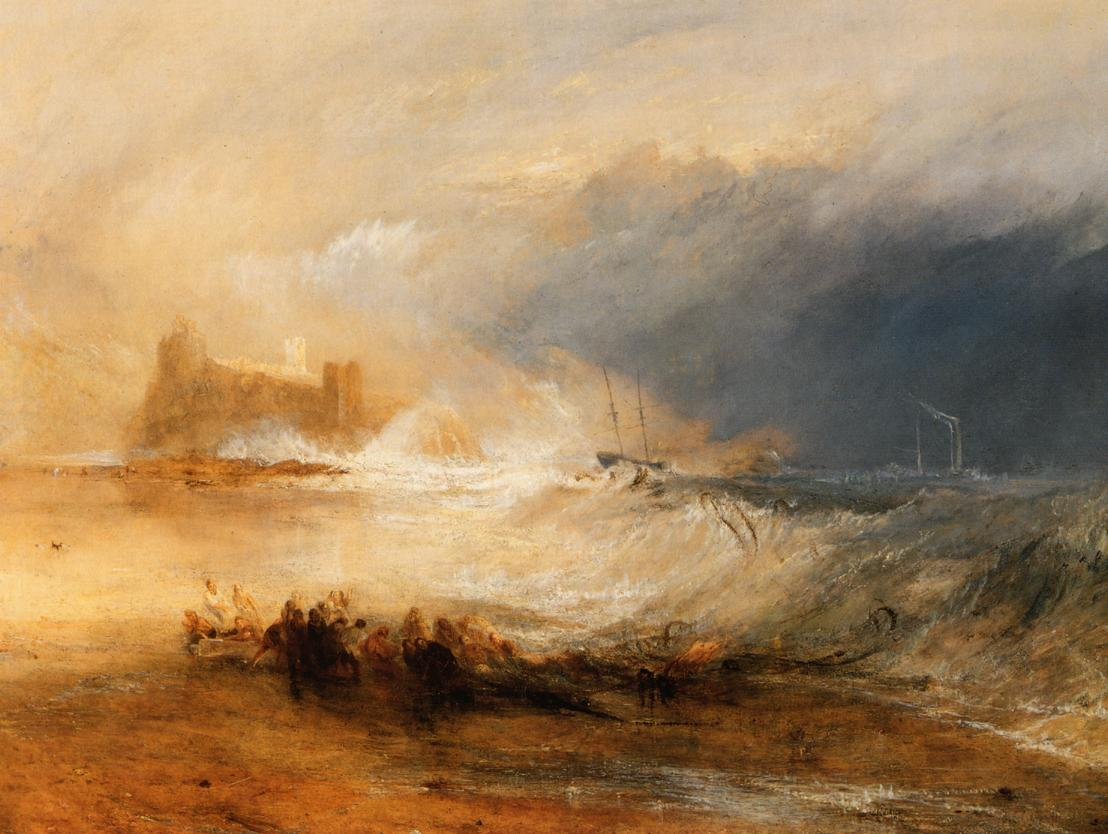
Wreckers, Coast of Northumberland (1834). Yale Center for British Art, New Haven.

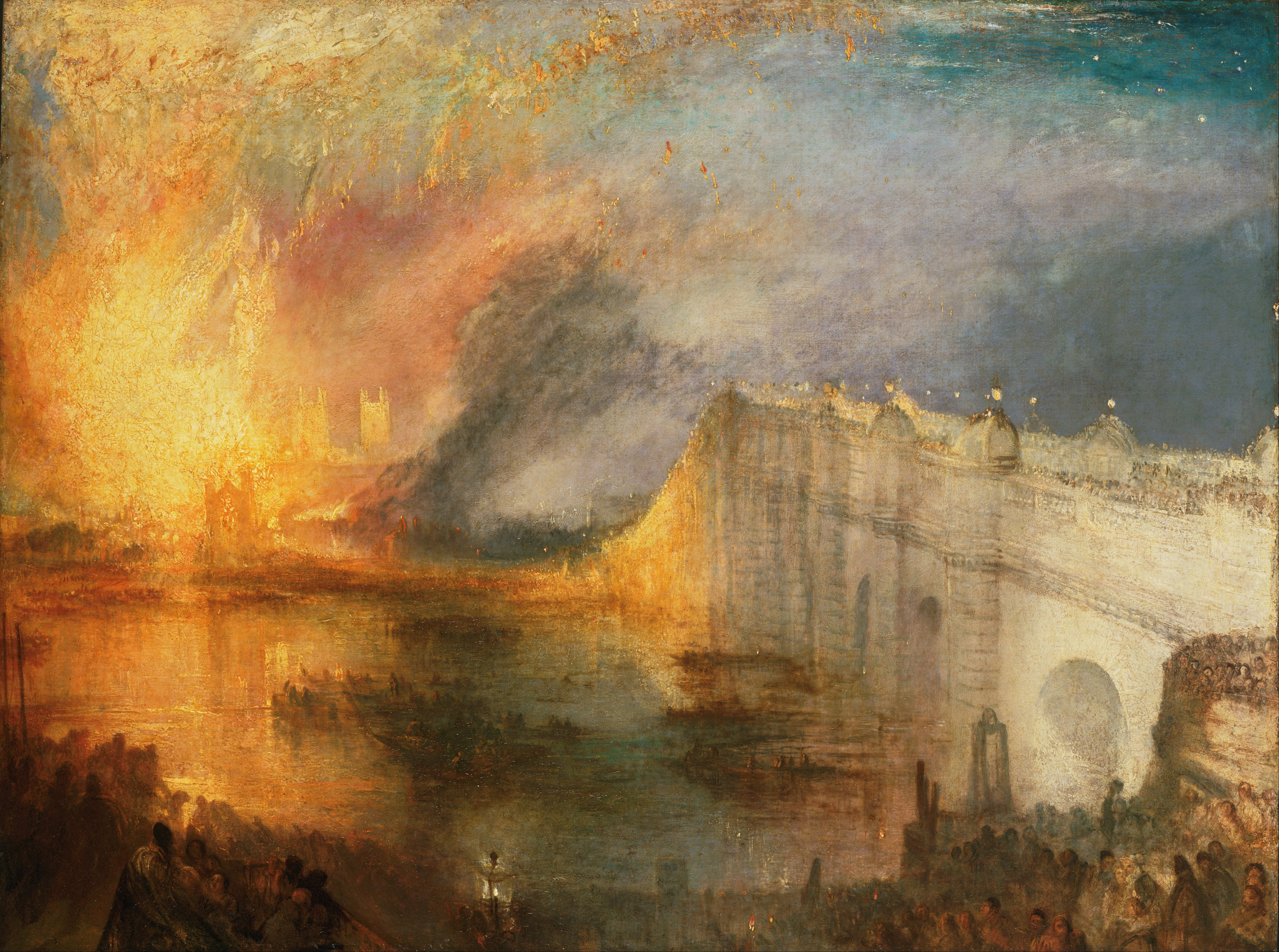
The Burning of the Houses of Lords and Commons, 16 October 1834 (c. 1835). Philadelphia Museum of Art, Philadelphia.

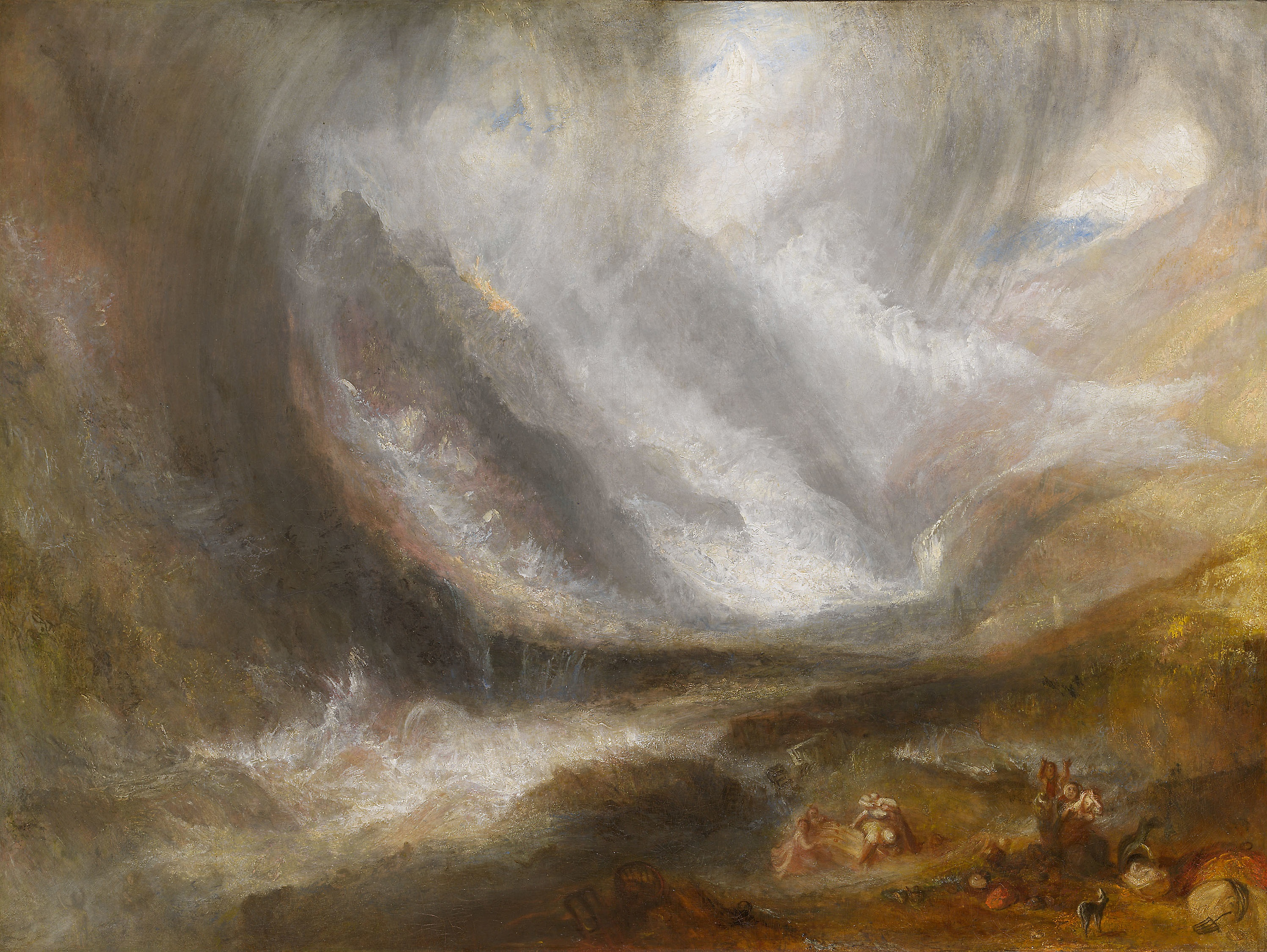
Valley of Aosta: Snowstorm, Avalanche and Thunderstorm (1836–37). Art Institute of Chicago, Chicago.

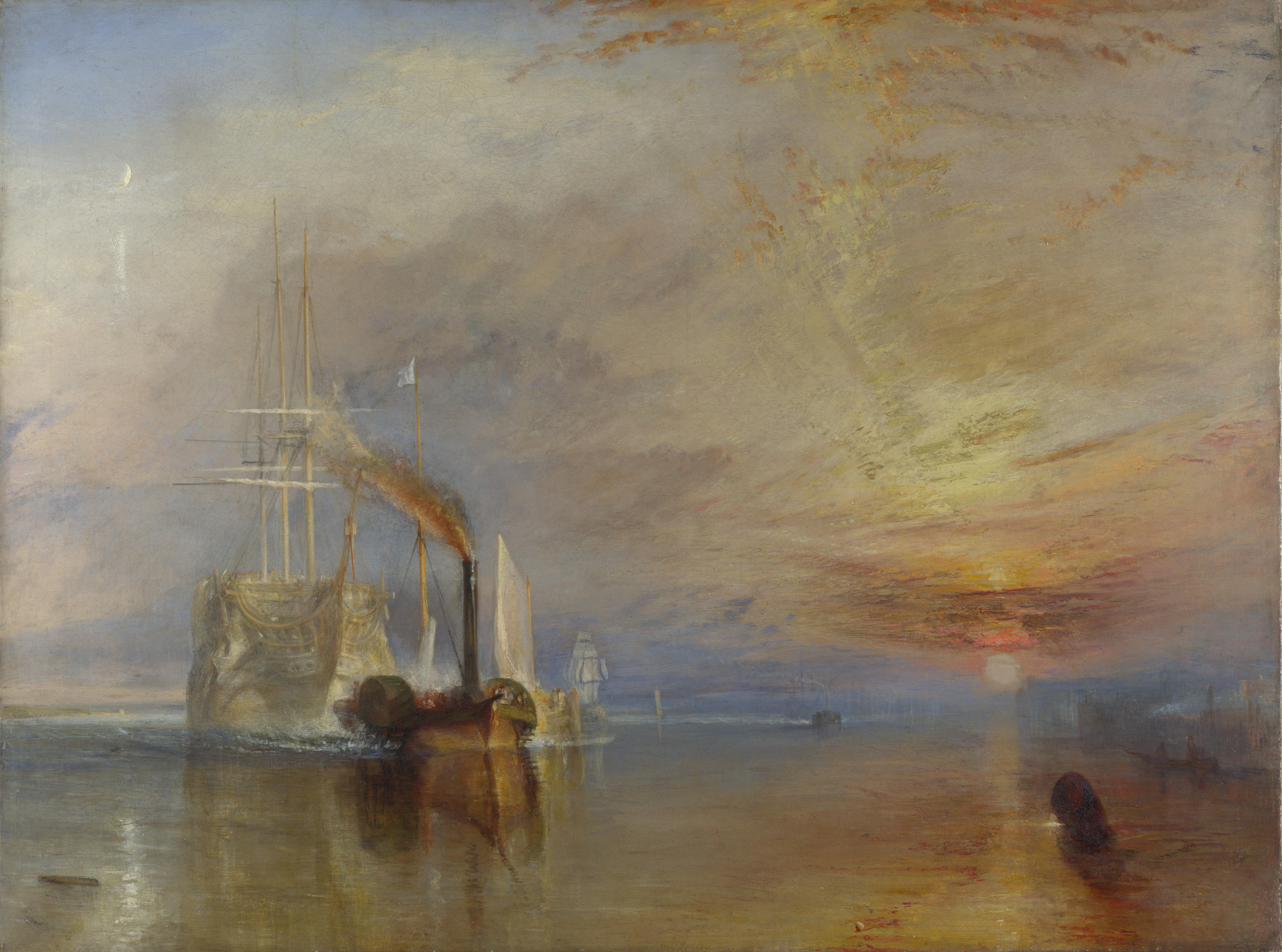
The Fighting Temeraire tugged to her last berth to be broken up (1838). National Gallery, London.

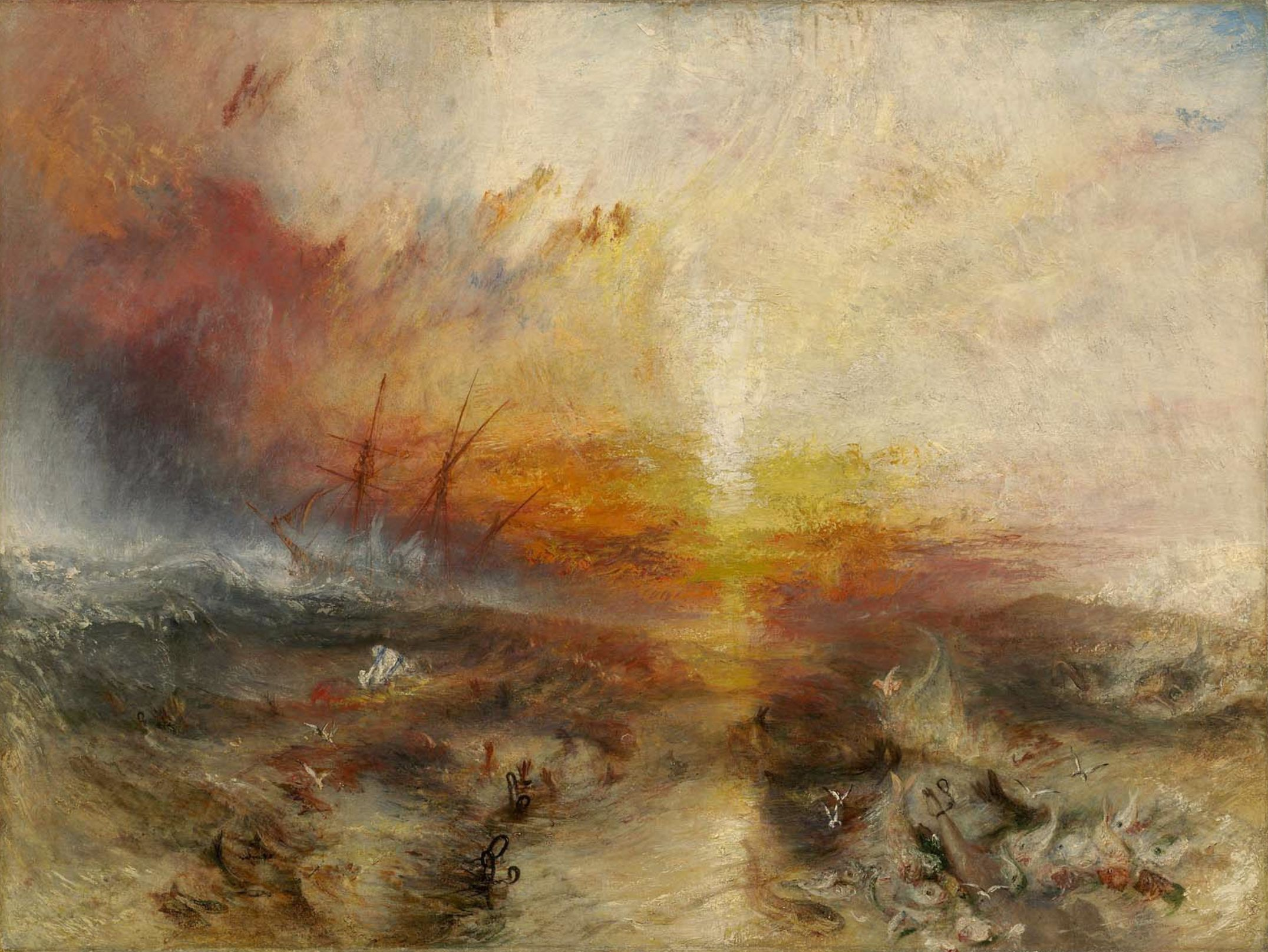
The Slave Ship (1840). Museum of Fine Arts, Boston, Boston.

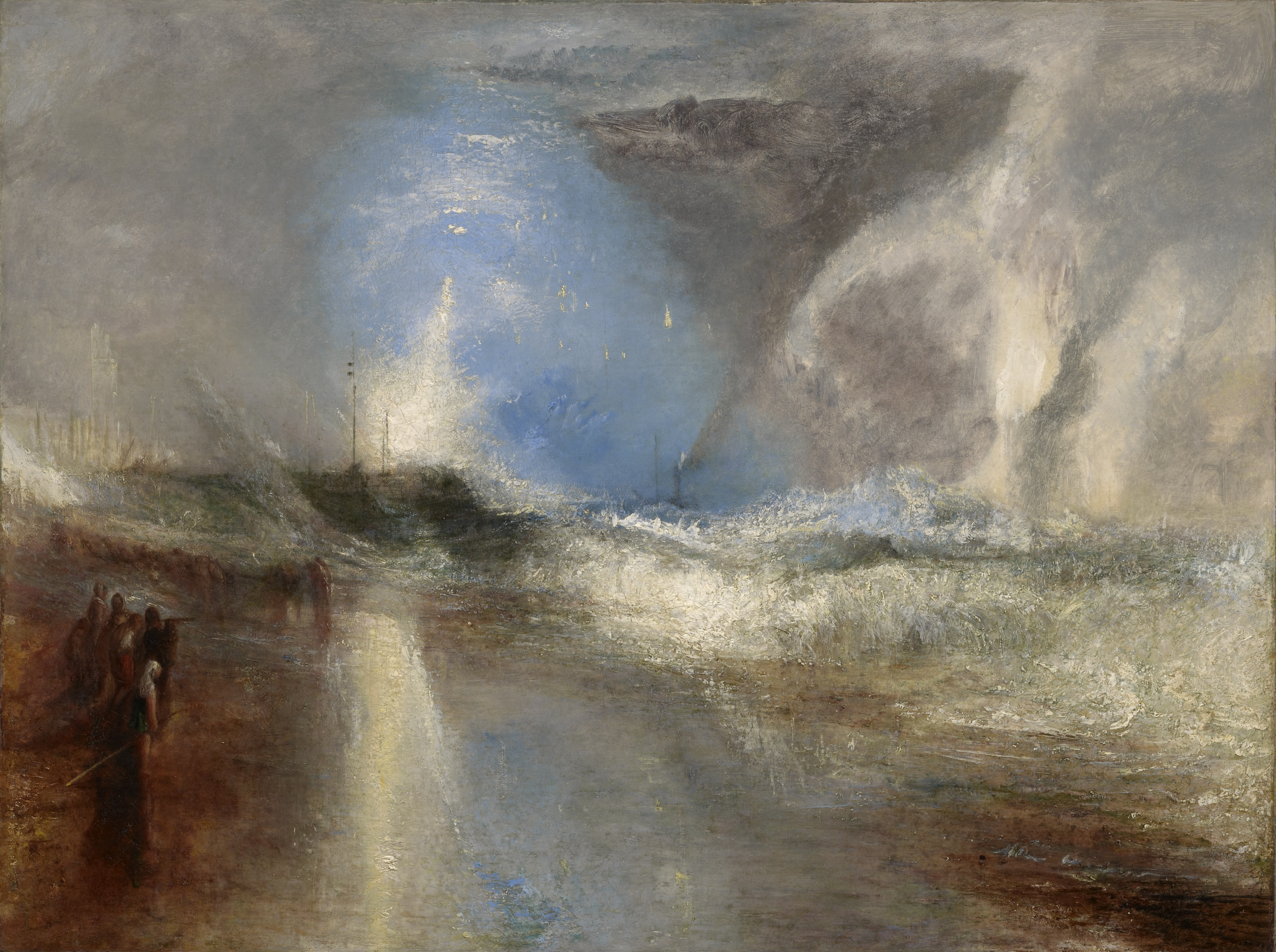
Rockets and Blue Lights (Close at Hand) to Warn Steamboats of Shoal Water (1840). Clark Art Institute, Williamstown, Massachusetts.

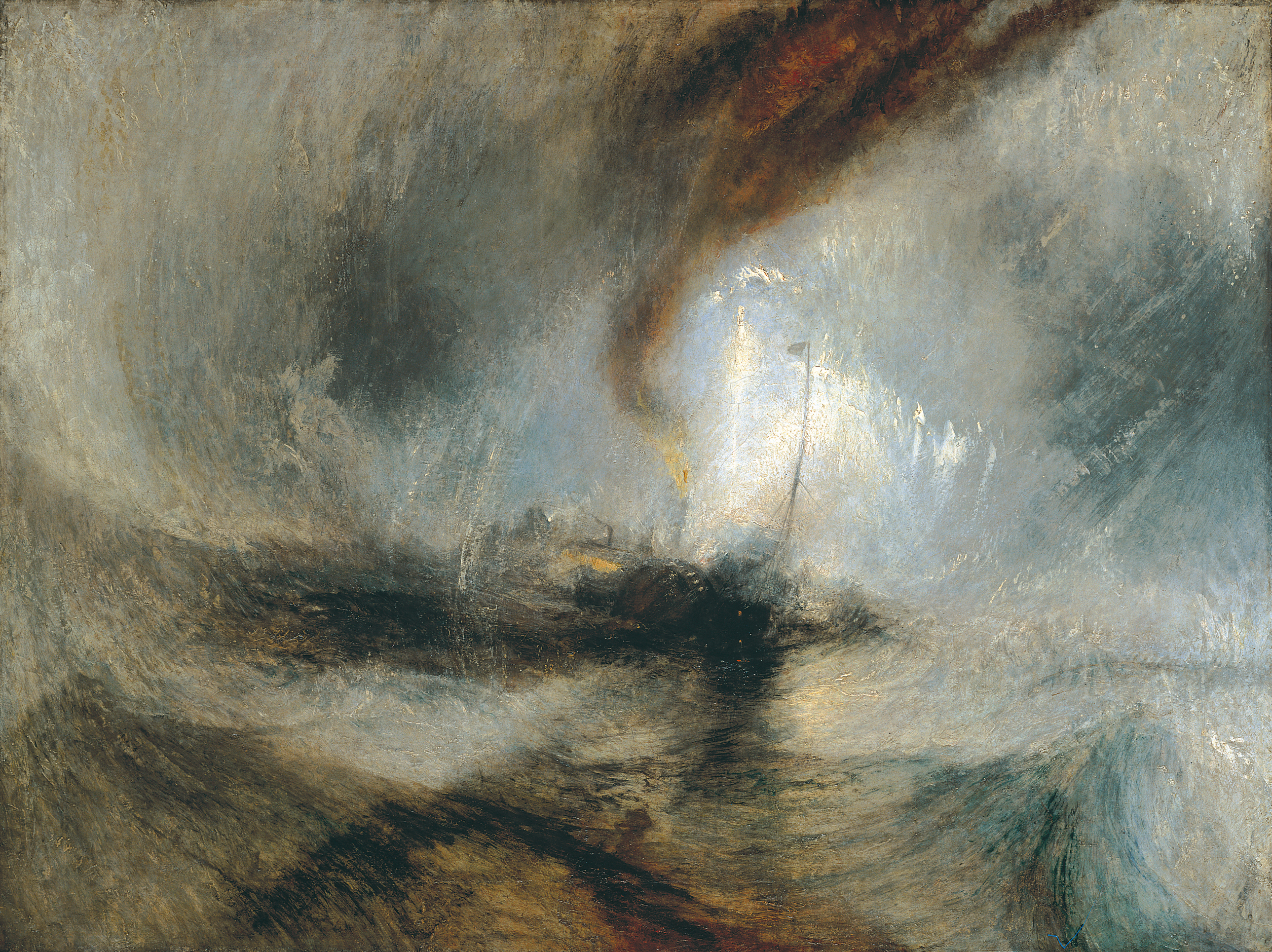
Snow Storm: Steam-Boat off a Harbour's Mouth (c. 1842). Tate Britain, London.

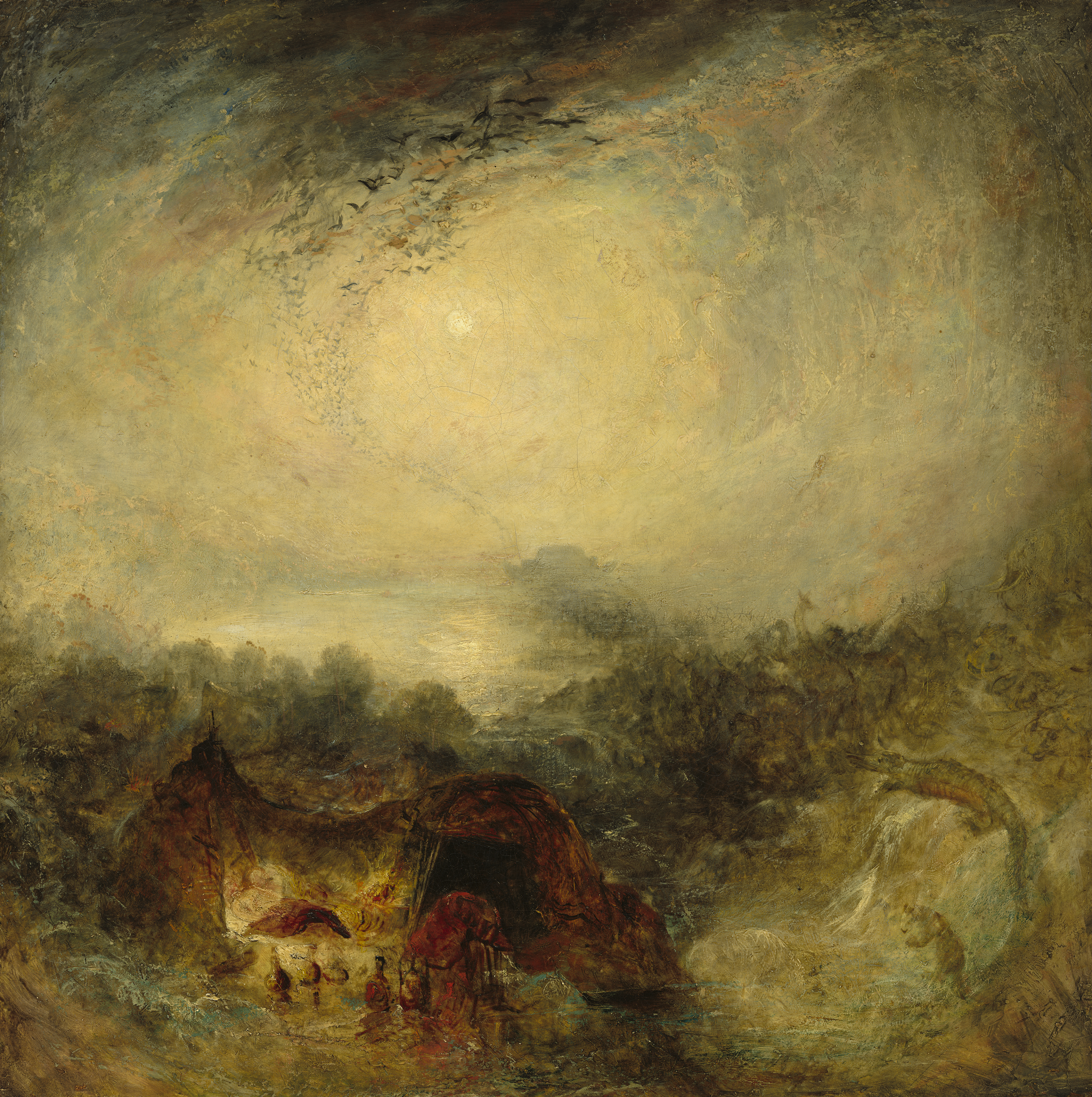
The Evening of the Deluge (c. 1843). National Gallery of Art, Washington D.C.

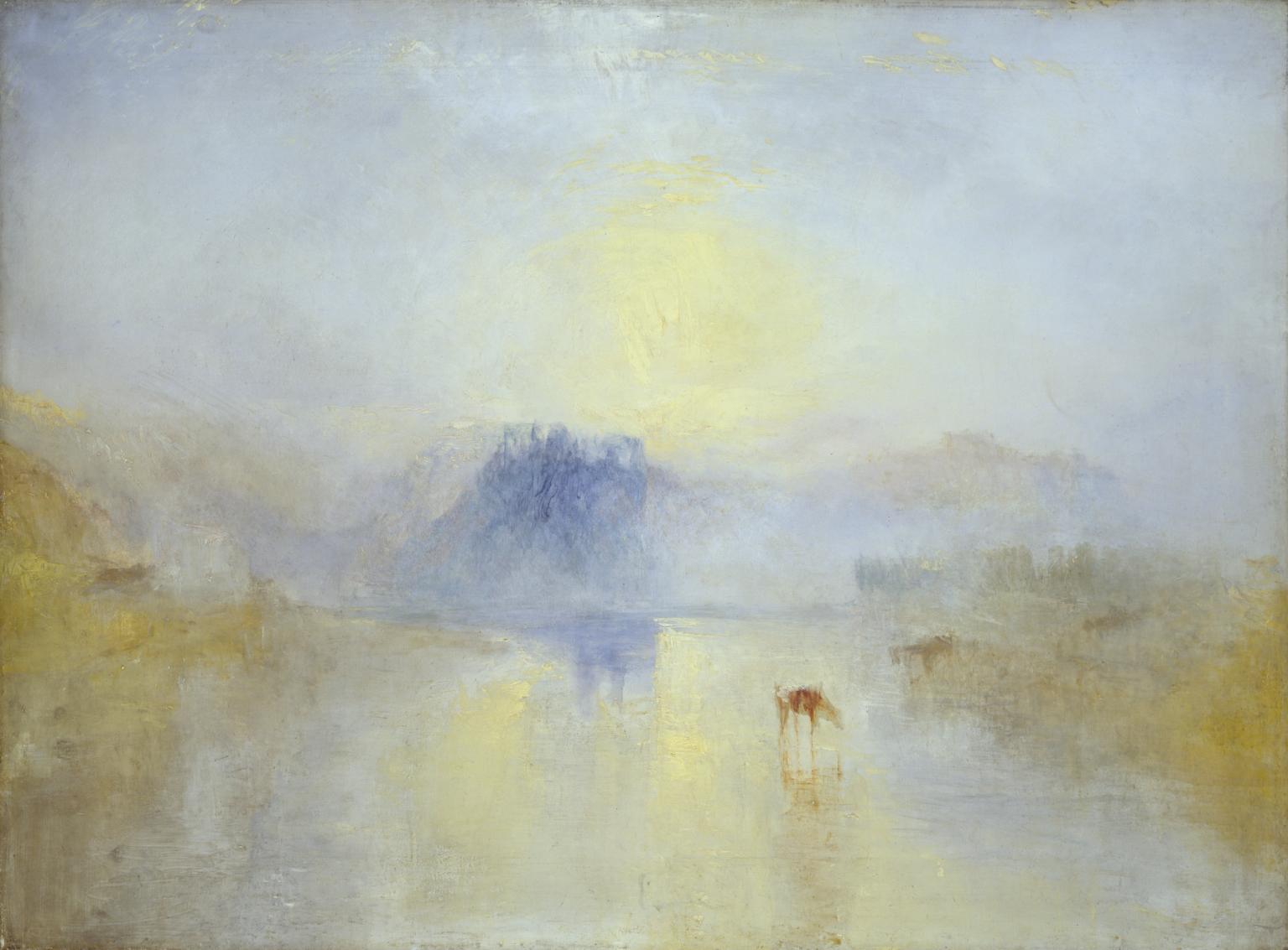
Norham Castle, Sunrise (c. 1845). Tate Britain, London.

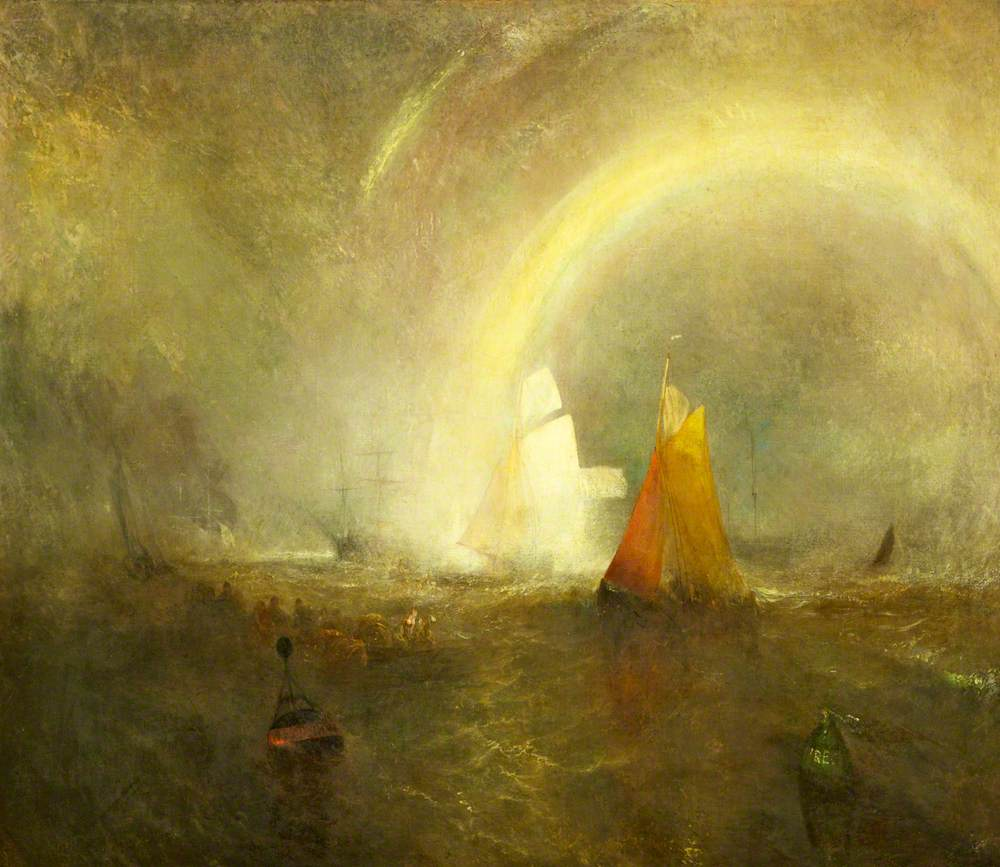
The Wreck Buoy (c. 1849). Sudley House, Liverpool.

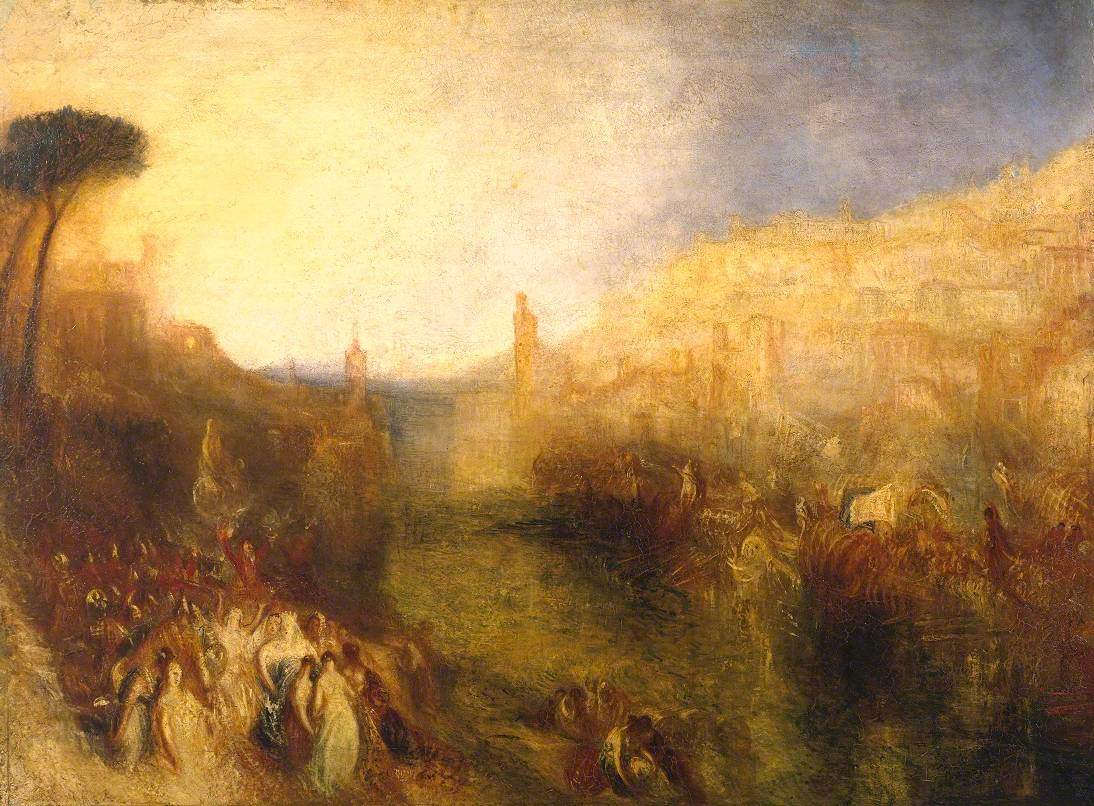
The Departure of the Fleet (1850). National Gallery, London.

== Legacy ==
=== Artistic legacy ===
Turner's use of colour and his experiments with the depiction of light exerted a powerful influence on the early Impressionists Monet and Pissarro, who saw his paintings during a visit to London in 1870, twenty years after Turner's death.

Early 1950s painting by Mark Rothko displayed next to Turner's works in Tate Britain.

In the 20th century, Mark Rothko (1903–1970) recognised a direct aesthetic inspiration from Turner’s open pictorial spaces and floating colour masses. He donated several pictures to Tate Britain in the hope that they would be displayed next to Turner’s and the museum attended to his wish. Modern painters Victor Pasmore, Sean Scully, and Olafur Eliasson, who worked with light, scale, and environment, have also been inspired by Turner's kinetic mark-making and immersive atmospheric space.

=== Commemoration and tributes ===
The Royal Academy of Arts, St Paul's Cathedral, and the Victoria & Albert Museum all hold statues of Turner. The City of Westminster unveiled a memorial plaque at the site of his birthplace at 21 Maiden Lane, Covent Garden, on 2 June 1999.

The Turner Prize was created in 1984. It is presented every year to a British visual artist, and includes a cash award of £40,000. In keeping with Turner's resolve to challenge established artistic traditions, it is awarded to artists who aspire to change the norms, so it usually generates considerable controversy and media coverage.

In 2005, Turner's The Fighting Temeraire was voted Britain's "greatest painting", in a public poll organised by the BBC.

From February 2020 to present (2026), the Bank of England £20 note has featured a portrait of Turner against a backdrop of The Fighting Temeraire, on the reverse.

== In popular culture ==
Leo McKern played Turner in The Sun Is God, a 1974 Thames Television production directed by Michael Darlow. The programme aired on 17 December 1974, during the Turner Bicentenary Exhibition in London.

Filmmaker Mike Leigh wrote and directed Mr. Turner, a biopic of Turner's later years, released in 2014. The film stars Timothy Spall as Turner, Dorothy Atkinson, Marion Bailey and Paul Jesson, and premiered in competition for the Palme d'Or at the 2014 Cannes Film Festival, with Spall taking the award for Best Actor.

== See also ==
- List of paintings by J. M. W. Turner

== Bibliography ==
=== Biographies ===
- Bailey, Anthony (2013) [1998]. Standing in the Sun: A Life of J. M. W. Turner. London: Tate Publishing. ISBN 978-1849761925.
- Finberg, A. J. (1961) [1939]. The Life of J. M. W. Turner, R.A. (2nd ed.). Oxford: Clarendon Press. OCLC 1150207012.
- Hamilton, James (2007). Turner. New York: Random House Trade Paperbacks. ISBN 978-0812967913.
- Thornbury, Walter (1877) [1862]. The Life and Correspondence of J.M.W. Turner, R.A. (New ed.). London: Chatto & Windus. OCLC 2893874.
- Shanes, Eric (2008). The Life and Masterworks of J.M.W. Turner: Life, Masterpieces, and the Light of English Romanticism. Temporis Series (4th ed.). Parkstone International. ISBN 978-1-78042-959-5.
- Walker, John (1983). Joseph Mallord William Turner (Concise ed.). New York: Harry N. Abrams. ISBN 978-0810916791.

=== References ===
- Andrews, Malcolm (2014). "Turner and the Mystery of the Sea". Caliban: French Journal of English Studies (52): 75–94. doi:10.4000/caliban.676.
- Beavan, Clare (26 April 2013). The Genius of Turner: Painting the Industrial Revolution (Television production). London: Fresh One Productions, BBC Two – via YouTube.
- Brown, David Blayney (December 2012). "J.M.W. Turner: Sketchbooks, Drawings and Watercolours – Project Overview". J.M.W. Turner: Sketchbooks, Drawings and Watercolours. Tate Research Publications. Archived from the original on 19 June 2021.
- Burke, Edmund (1990) [1757]. Phillips, Adam (ed.). A Philosophical Enquiry into the Origin of Our Ideas of the Sublime and Beautiful. Oxford World's Classics. Oxford: Oxford University Press. ISBN 978-0-19-281807-2.
- Finlay, Victoria (2004) [2002]. Color: A Natural History of the Palette. New York: Random House Trade Paperbacks. ISBN 978-0-8129-7142-2.
- Landow, George P. (1971). The Aesthetic and Critical Theories of John Ruskin. Princeton, NJ: Princeton University Press. ISBN 978-0-691-06198-6.
- Ibata, Hélène (2018). The Challenge of the Sublime: From Burke's Philosophical Enquiry to British Romantic Art. Manchester: Manchester University Press. ISBN 978-1526114822.
- Moorby, Nicola; Warrell, Ian; Chaplin, Mike (2010). How to Paint Like Turner. London: Tate Publishing. ISBN 978-1854378835.
- Moorby, Nicola (2025). Turner and Constable: Art, Life, and Landscape. London and New Haven: Yale University Press. ISBN 978-0300275810.
- Morales, Patricia (October 2003). Mere Good Taste is Nothing Else but Genius Without the Power of Execution: Artists as Arbiters of Taste, 1792–1836 (PhD thesis). University of Warwick. OCLC 500473917.
- Piper, David (2004). The Illustrated History of Art. London: Bounty Books. ISBN 978-0-7537-0969-6.
- Reynolds, Joshua (1992) [1778]. Rogers, Pat (ed.). Discourses. London: Penguin Books. ISBN 978-0-14-043278-7.
- Riding, Christine; Johns, Richard (2013). Turner and the Sea. London: Tate Publishing. ISBN 978-1-84976-100-0.
- Ruskin, John (1843–1860). Modern Painters. Vol. 1–5. London: Smith, Elder & Co. OCLC 220677567.
- Shackelford, George (16 October 2021). Inaugural Lecture: Turner's Modern World (Video lecture). Kimbell Art Museum – via YouTube.
- Townsend, Joyce H. (1993). Turner's Painting Techniques. London: Tate Publishing. ISBN 978-1854371256.
- Wilton, Andrew (1987). Turner in His Time. London: Thames & Hudson. ISBN 978-0500190456.
- Wilton, Andrew (28 July 2022). "The eighteenth-century technological awakening of artist adventurers". Engelsberg Ideas.
- Wilton, Andrew (29 January 2025). "Turner's genius for technology". Engelsberg Ideas.
- Ziff, Jerrold (1963). "'Backgrounds, Introduction of Architecture and Landscape': A Lecture by J. M. W. Turner". Journal of the Warburg and Courtauld Institutes. 26 (1/2): 124–147. doi:10.2307/750572. JSTOR 750572.
