= Landscape with Windmill and Rainbow =

Painting attributed to J. M. W. Turner

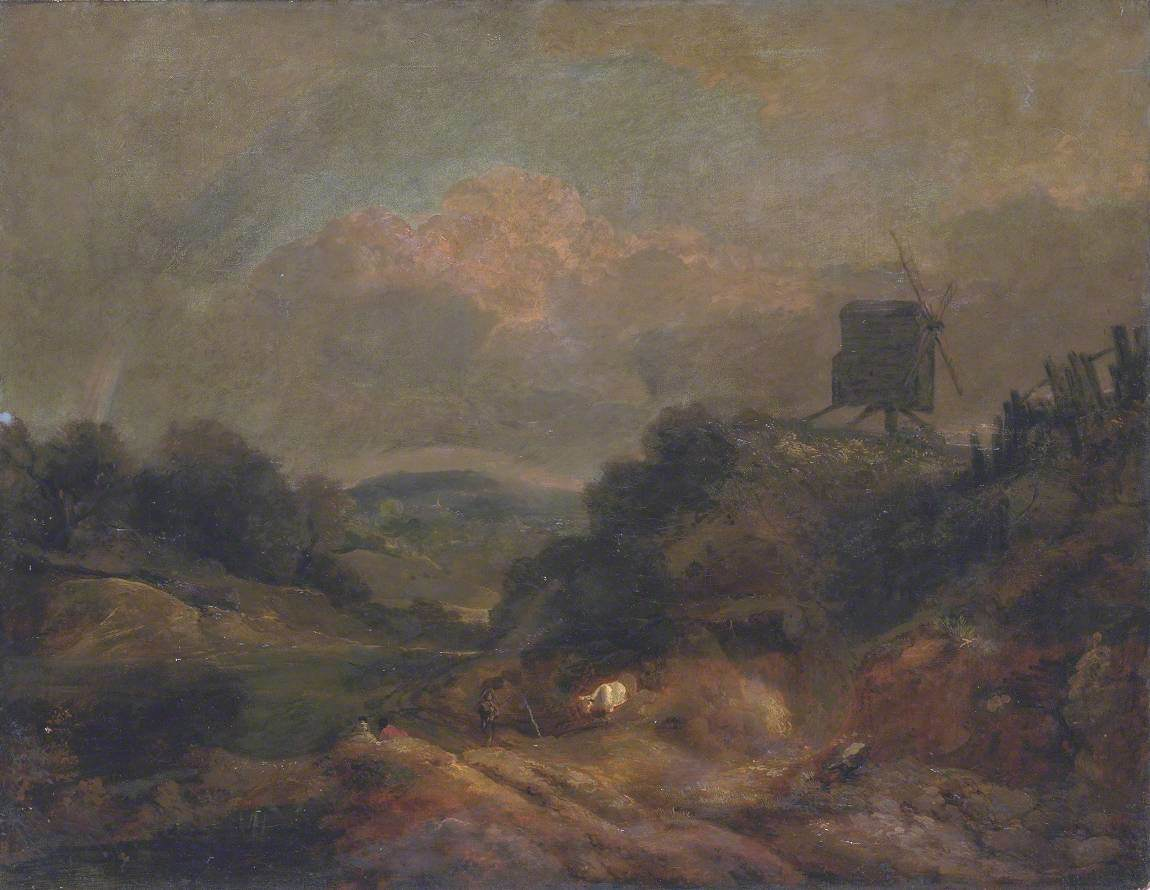
Landscape with Windmill and Rainbow (c. 1795–1800) by J. M. W. Turner

Landscape with Windmill and Rainbow is a painting attributed to J. M. W. Turner, painted c. 1795–1800. It has the dimensions of 70.5 by 90.2 cm. It is believed to have been created at least partially in a painting by Thomas Gainsborough. It is held at the Tate Gallery, in London.

== See also ==
- List of paintings by J. M. W. Turner
