= Interior of a Gothic Church (J. M. W. Turner) =

Painting by J. M. W. Turner

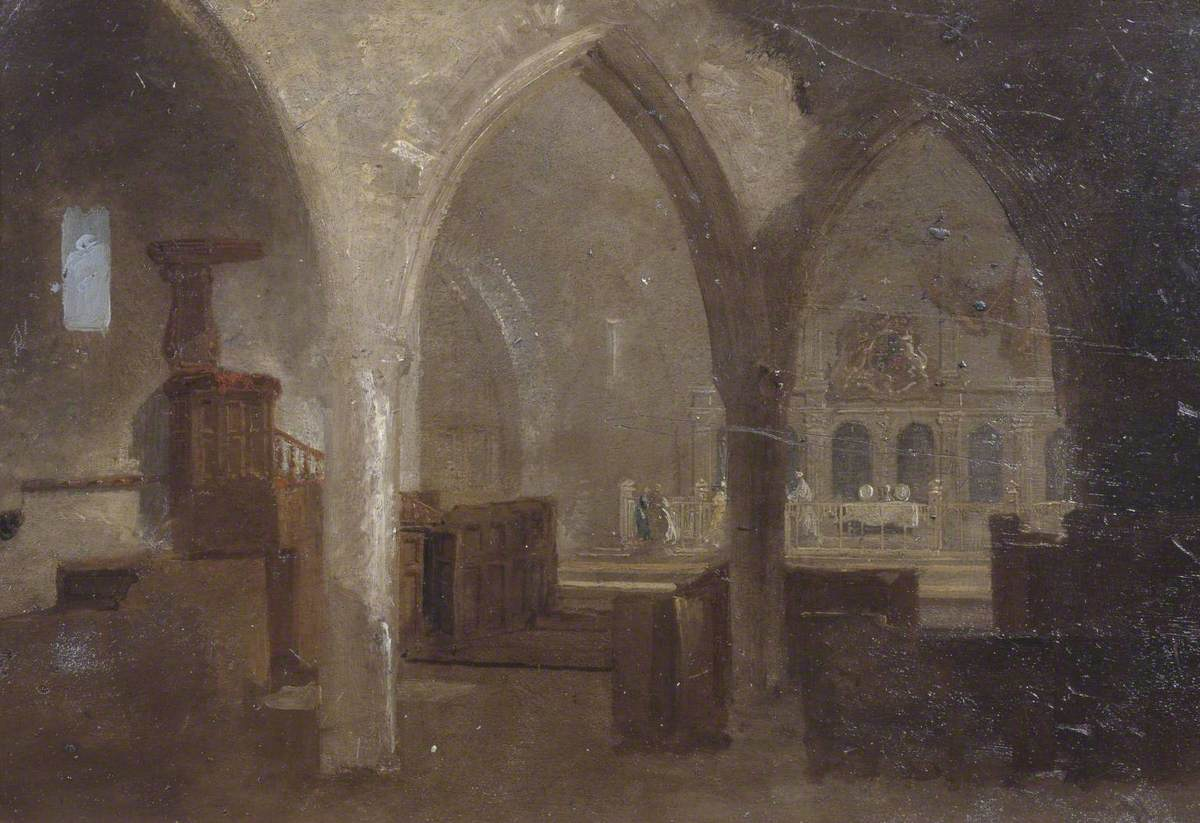
- Artist: J. M. W. Turner
- Year: c. 1797
- Medium: oil on boad
- Dimensions: 40.6 cm × 27.9 cm (16.0 in × 11.0 in)
- Location: Tate Gallery, London
- Website: www.tate.org.uk/...n05536

Interior of a Gothic Church is an early oil on board painting by English artist Joseph Mallord William Turner, made c. 1797.

Painted on a mahogany board, it depicts the interior of an unidentified church, probably in or near London, with pointed Gothic masonry arches, and wooden furniture including a tall pulpit, pews, and a depiction of the royal coat of arms. Around the same date, Turner made several watercolour sketches of church interiors, and at least none other oil on board painting showing the Interior of a Romanesque Church. It was left to the nation as part of the Turner Bequest and is now held by the Tate Gallery, in London.

== See also ==
- List of paintings by J. M. W. Turner
