= Aeneas and the Sibyl, Lake Avernus =

Painting by J. M. W. Turner

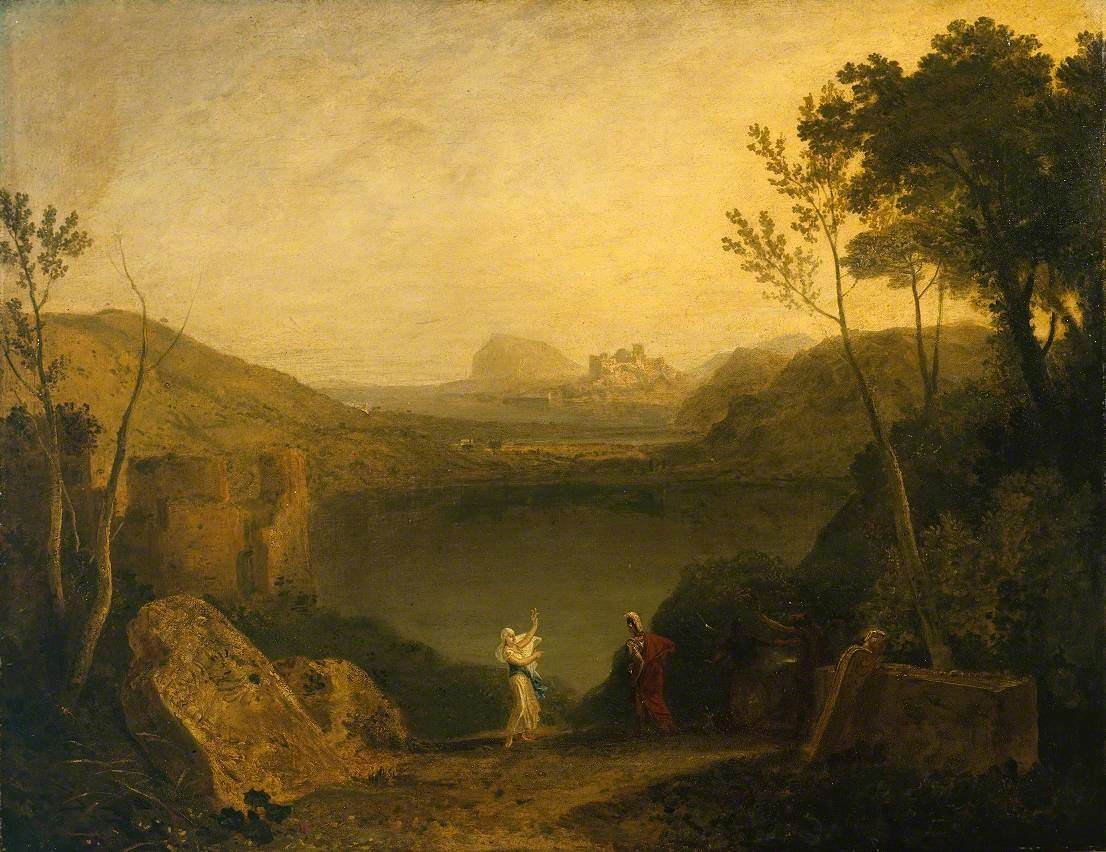
- Artist: J. M. W. Turner
- Year: c. 1798
- Medium: oil on canvas
- Dimensions: 145 cm × 145 cm (57 in × 57 in)
- Location: Tate Gallery, London
- Website: www.tate.org.uk/...n00463

Aeneas and the Sibyl, Lake Avernus is a painting by J. M. W. Turner (23 April 1775 – 19 December 1851), painted c. 1798.

== See also ==
- List of paintings by J. M. W. Turner
- Catalogue Entry
