= Caernarvon Castle (J. M. W. Turner) =

Painting by J. M. W. Turner

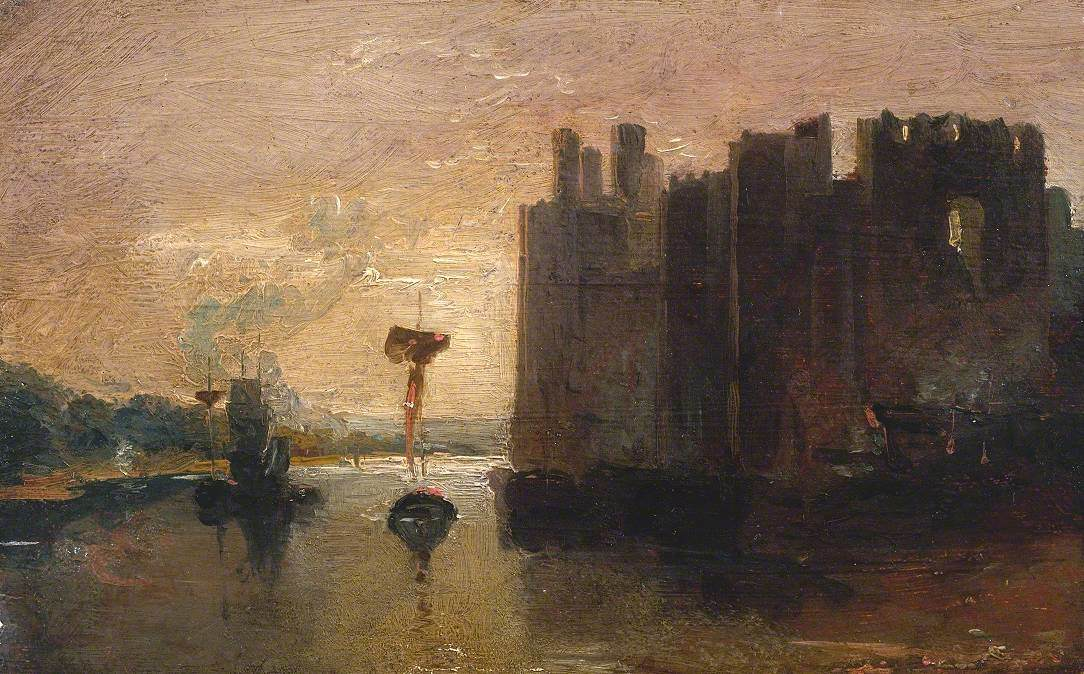
- Artist: J. M. W. Turner
- Year: c. 1798
- Medium: oil on canvas
- Dimensions: 23.2 cm × 15.2 cm (9.1 in × 6.0 in)
- Location: Tate Gallery, London
- Website: www.tate.org.uk/...n01867

Caernarvon Castle is a painting by J. M. W. Turner (23 April 1775 – 19 December 1851), painted c. 1798. The painting is currently in the collection of the Tate Gallery.

== See also ==
- List of paintings by J. M. W. Turner
- Catalogue Entry
