= View in Wales: Mountain Scene with Village and Castle - Evening (J. M. W. Turner) =

Painting by J. M. W. Turner

View in Wales
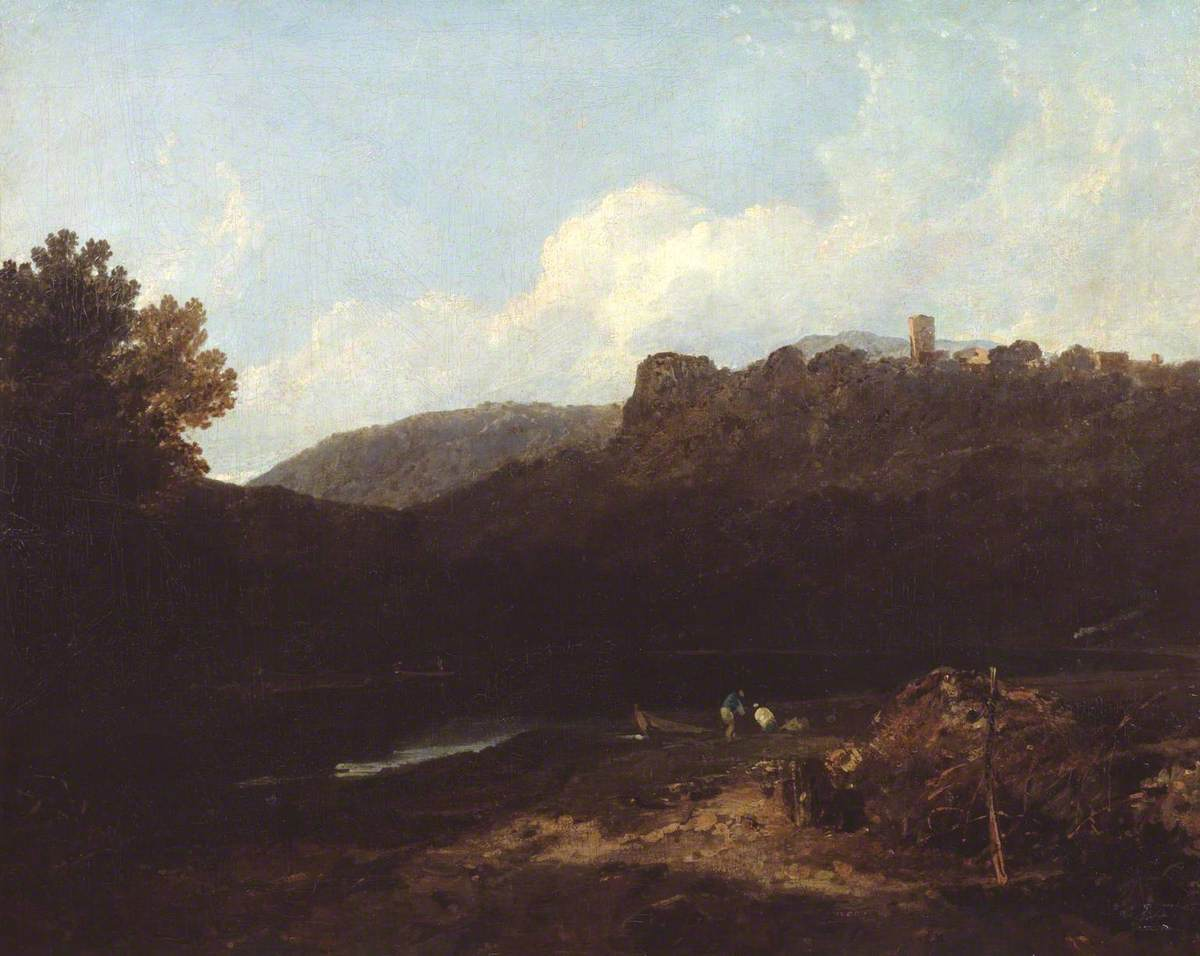
- Artist: J. M. W. Turner
- Year: 1799-1800
- Medium: oil on canvas
- Dimensions: 72.7 cm × 58.1 cm (28.6 in × 22.9 in)
- Location: Tate Britain, London
- Website: www.tate.org.uk/...n00466

View in Wales: Mountain Scene with Village and Castle - Evening is a painting by J. M. W. Turner, painted c. 1799–1800.

== See also ==
- List of paintings by J. M. W. Turner
- Catalogue Entry
