= Landscape with Lake and Fallen Tree (J. M. W. Turner) =

Painting by J. M. W. Turner

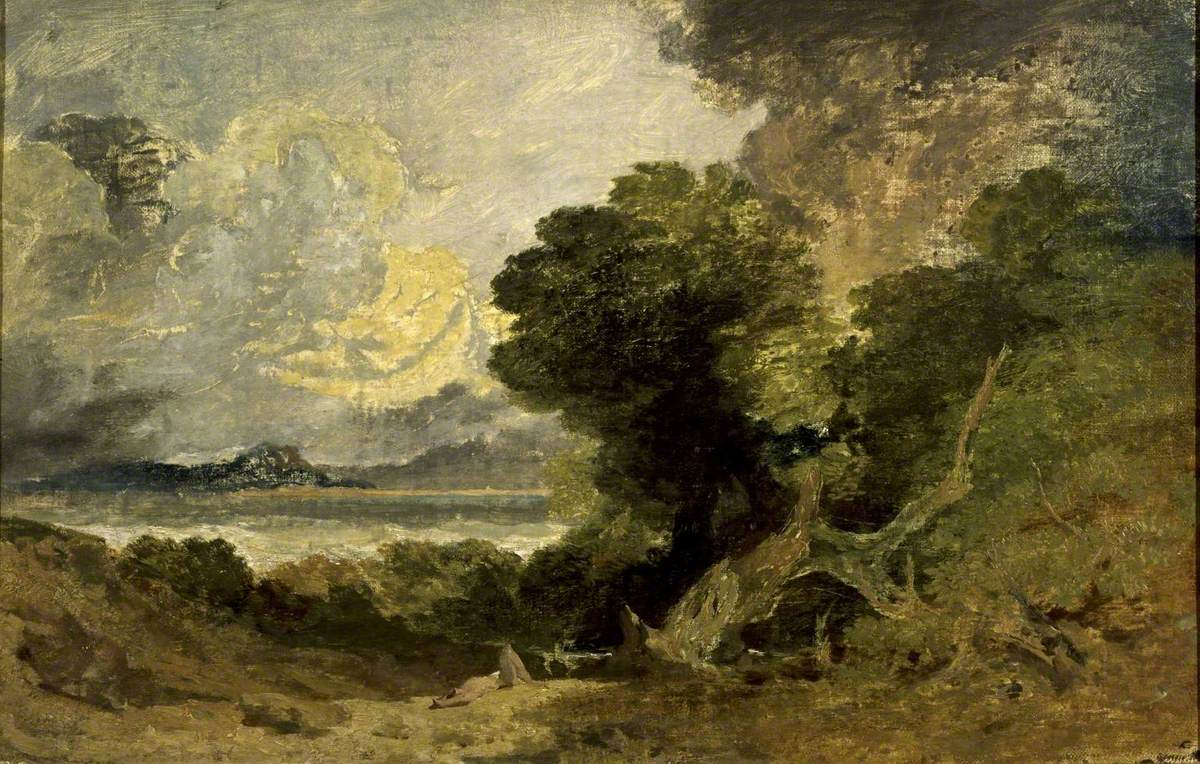
- Artist: J. M. W. Turner
- Year: c. 1800
- Medium: oil on canvas
- Dimensions: 60.6 cm × 39.1 cm (23.9 in × 15.4 in)
- Location: Tate Britain, London
- Website: www.tate.org.uk/...n03557

Landscape with Lake and Fallen Tree is a painting by J.M.W. Turner (23 April 1775 – 19 December 1851), painted c. 1800.

== See also ==
- List of paintings by J. M. W. Turner
- Edit this at Wikidata Catalogue Entry
