= A First Rate Taking in Stores =

Painting by J. M. W. Turner

- Artist: J. M. W. Turner
- Year: 1818
- Type: Watercolour, genre painting
- Dimensions: 28.6 cm × 39.7 cm (11.3 in × 15.6 in)
- Location: Higgins Art Gallery; Bedford

A First Rate Taking in Stores is an 1818 genre painting by the British artist J.M.W. Turner. A watercolour it depicts a Royal Navy ship-of-the-line loading abroad naval stores.

The work was produced by Tuner for his patron Walter Fawkes. It is noted for the contrast in light between the ship, bathed in sunlight, and the darker shadows around it. The painting is in the collection of the Higgins Art Gallery in Bedford, having been acquired in 1953.

== See also ==
- List of paintings by J. M. W. Turner

== Bibliography ==
- O'Neill, Mary, Partridge, Victoria & Payne, Christiana. Colour & Light:The Cecil Higgins Art Gallery Collection. The Higgins, 2015.
- Shanes, Eric. The Life and Masterworks of J.M.W. Turner. Parkstone International, 2012.
