= A Beech Wood with Gypsies round a Campfire (J. M. W. Turner) =

Painting by J. M. W. Turner

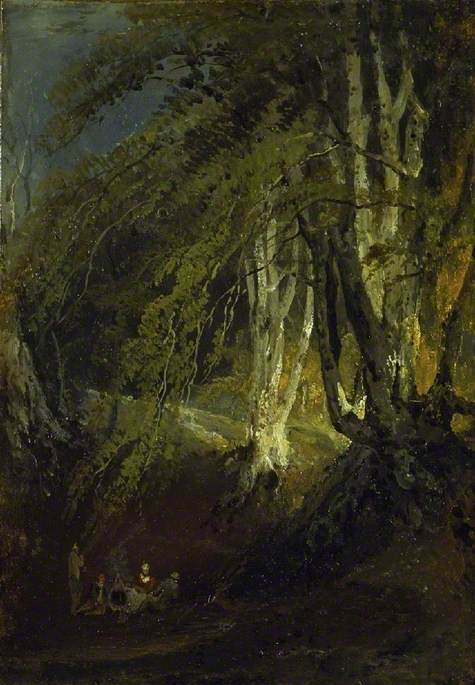

A Beech Wood with Gypsies round a Campfire is a painting by J. M. W. Turner (23 April 1775 - 19 December 1851), painted c. 1799–1801.

== See also ==
- List of paintings by J. M. W. Turner
