= Tivoli and the Roman Campagna (J. M. W. Turner) =

Painting by J. M. W. Turner

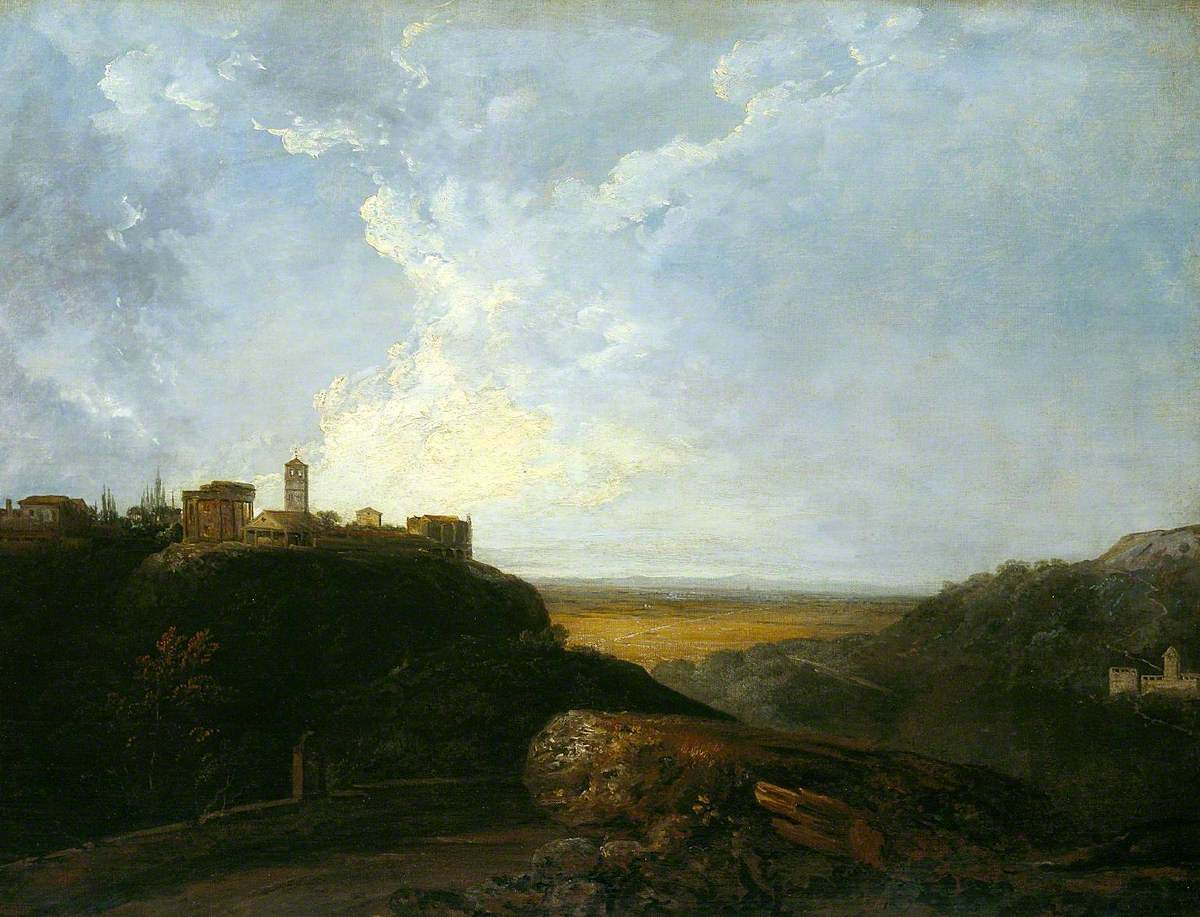
- Artist: J. M. W. Turner
- Year: c. 1798
- Medium: oil on canvas
- Dimensions: 96.5 cm × 72.4 cm (38.0 in × 28.5 in)
- Location: Tate, London
- Website: www.tate.org.uk/...n05512

Tivoli and the Roman Campagna is a painting by J. M. W. Turner (23 April 1775 - 19 December 1851), painted c. 1798. The painting is currently in the collection of the Tate.

== See also ==
- List of paintings by J. M. W. Turner
- Catalogue Entry
