= Morning amongst the Coniston Fells, Cumberland =

Painting by J. M. W. Turner

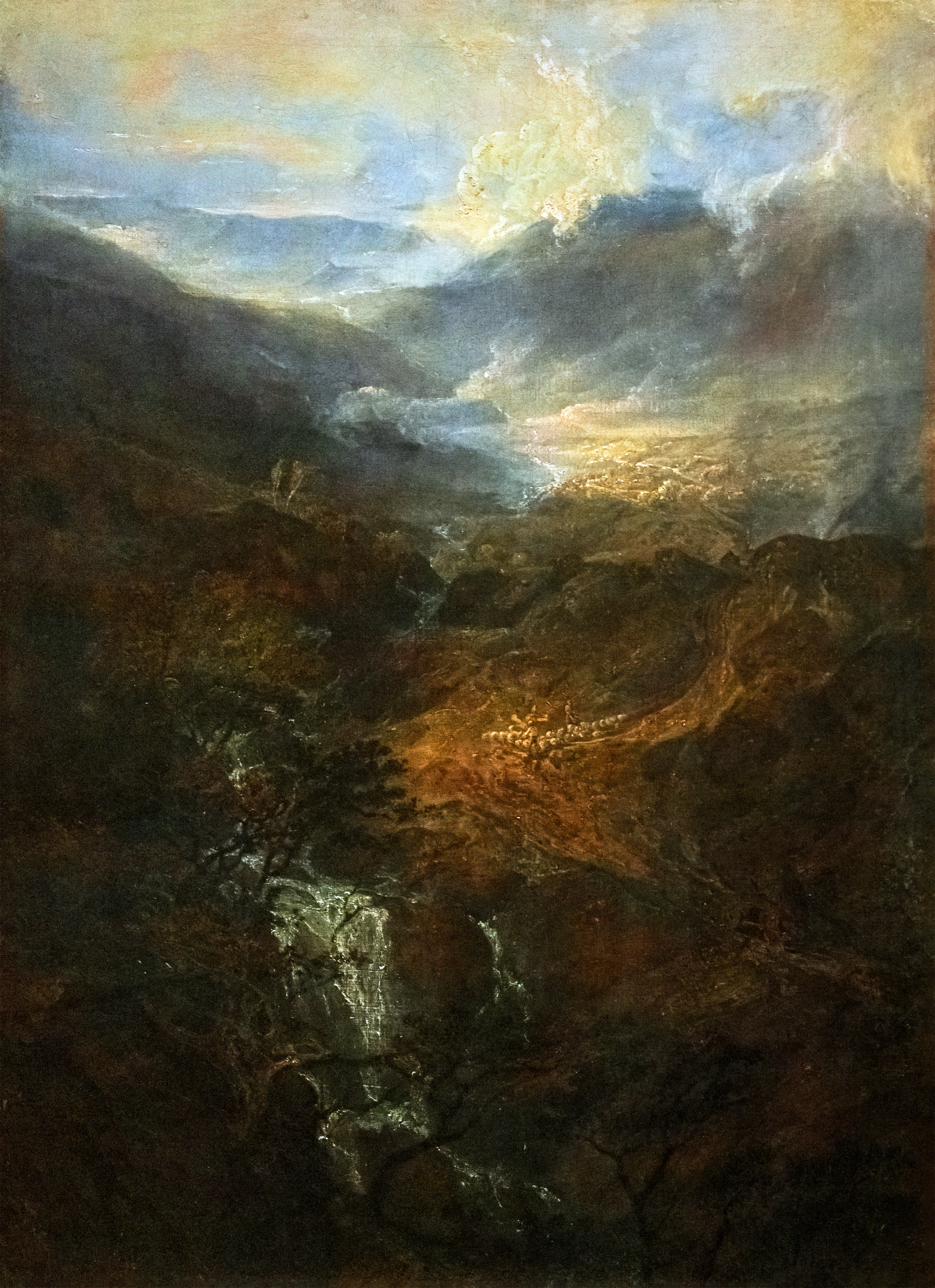
- Artist: J. M. W. Turner
- Year: exhibited 1798
- Medium: Oil on canvas
- Dimensions: 122.9 cm × 89.9 cm (48.4 in × 35.4 in)
- Accession: N00461
- Website: www.tate.org.uk/...n00461

Morning amongst the Coniston Fells, Cumberland, is a painting by J. M. W. Turner (23 April 1775 - 19 December 1851), painted c. 1798. It depicts the Old Man of Coniston, Cumbria, England.

The work was displayed at the Royal Academy Exhibition of 1798 at Somerset House. In the catalogue of the Royal Academy from 1798, when verses were allowed for the first time, Turner included four lines from Paradise Lost, Book V:

—"Ye mists and exhalations that now rise

"From hill or streaming[sic] lake, dusky or gray,

"Till the sun paints your fleecy skirts with gold,

"In honour to the world's great Author, rise."

The Whitehall Evening Post of May 10-12, 1798 reviewed the painting as "a beautiful and well-executed landscape. The distance is so admirably preserved, as to induce a momentary deception, and appears as if the Spectator might actually walk into the picture."

== See also ==
- List of paintings by J. M. W. Turner
