= Ploughing Up Turnips, near Slough ('Windsor') =

Painting by J. M. W. Turner

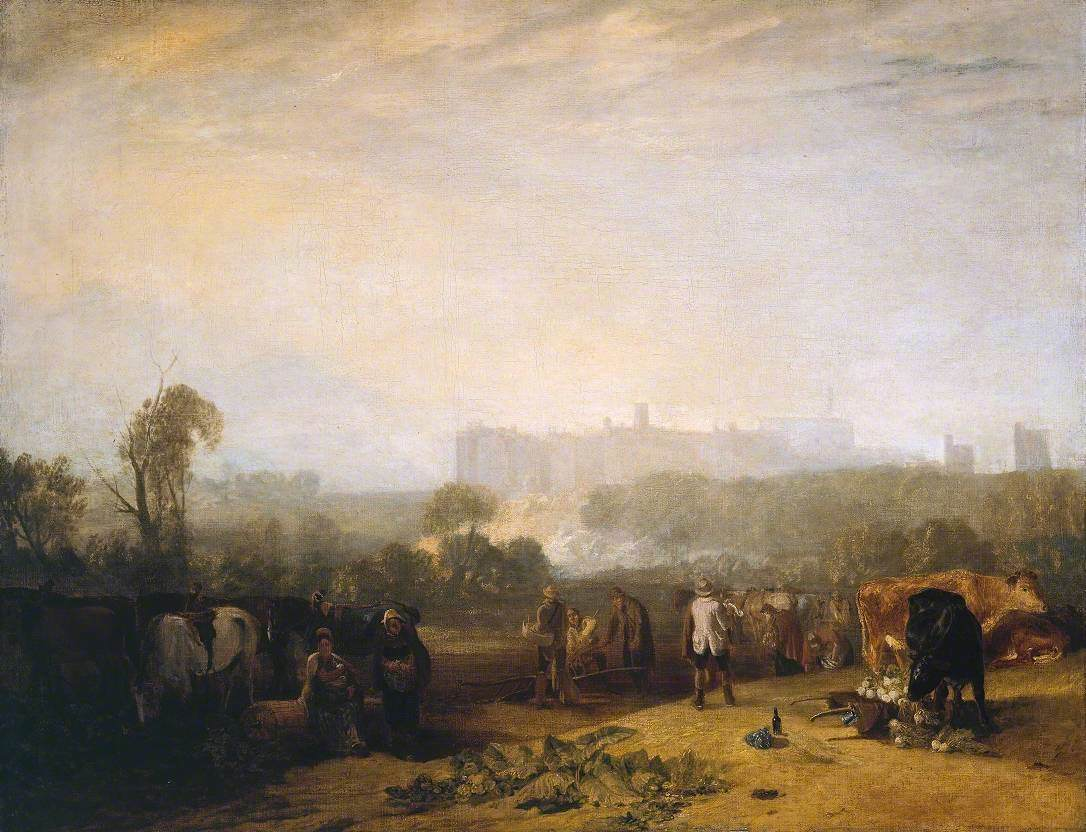
- Artist: J. M. W. Turner
- Year: 1809
- Medium: Oil on canvas
- Dimensions: 101.9 cm × 130.2 cm (40.1 in × 51.3 in)
- Location: Tate Britain, London
- Accession: N00486
- Website: tate.org.uk/...n00486

Ploughing Up Turnips, near Slough ('Windsor') is an 1809 oil-on-canvas painting by the British artist J.M.W. Turner combining elements of landscape art and genre painting. It depicts a view of Windsor in Berkshire, some miles west of London. Despite the presence of Windsor Castle and Eton College on the skyline, the focus is on the farm labourers harvesting turnips during the winter. The turnips were then used to fatten cattle.

The style echoes the work of Claude Lorrain, who Turner admired. It was exhibited at the Royal Academy's Summer Exhibition of 1809 at Somerset House in London. Today it is in the collection of the Tate Britain in Pimlico, having been part of the Turner Bequest to the nation.

== See also ==
- List of paintings by J. M. W. Turner

== Bibliography ==
- Bailey, Anthony. J.M.W. Turner: Standing in the Sun. Tate Enterprises Ltd, 2013.
- Broglio, Ron. Technologies of the Picturesque: British Art, Poetry, and Instruments, 1750-1830. Associated University Press, 2008.
- Cosgrove, Denis & Daniels, Stephen. The Iconography of Landscape: Essays on the Symbolic Representation, Design and Use of Past Environments. Cambridge University Press, 1988.
- Hamilton, James. Turner - A Life. Sceptre, 1998.
- Reynolds, Graham. Turner. Thames & Hudson, 2022.
