= View on Clapham Common (J. M. W. Turner) =

Painting by Joseph Mallord William Turner

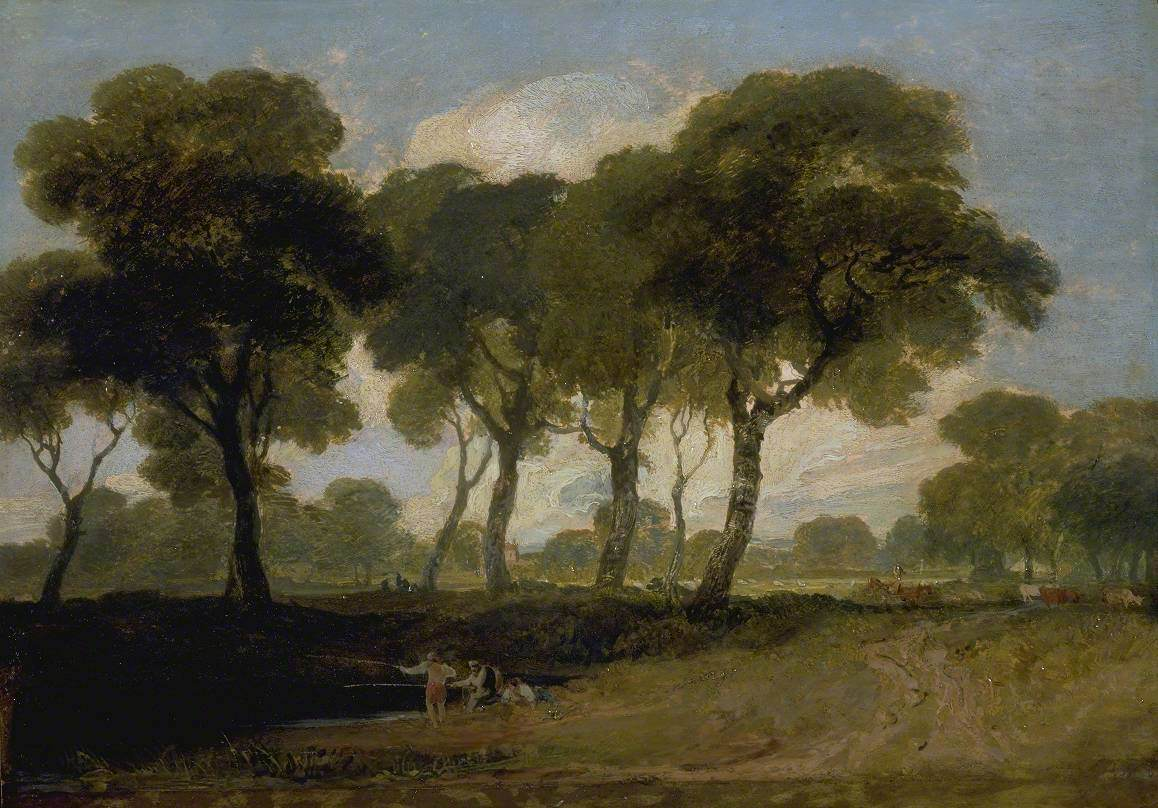
- Artist: J. M. W. Turner
- Year: 1800-1805
- Medium: oil on canvas
- Dimensions: 44.5 cm × 32.1 cm (17.5 in × 12.6 in)
- Location: Tate Britain, London
- Website: www.tate.org.uk/...n00468

View on Clapham Common is a painting by J. M. W. Turner, painted c. 1800–1805. The painting is currently in the collection of the Tate Britain.

== See also ==
- List of paintings by J. M. W. Turner
- Catalogue Entry
