= The Junction of the Thames and the Medway =

Painting by J. M. W. Turner

The Junction of the Thames and Medway
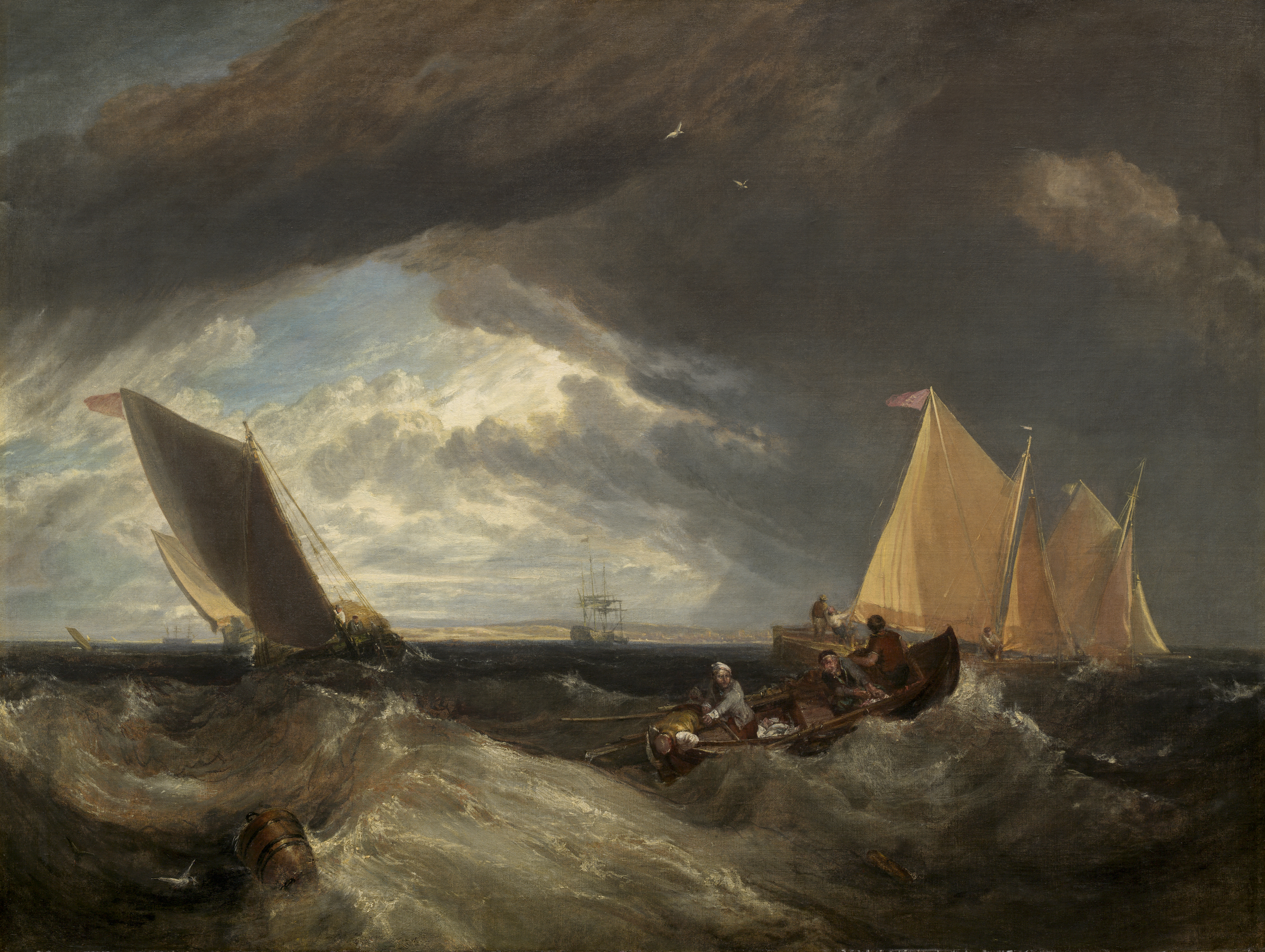
- Artist: J. M. W. Turner
- Year: 1807
- Type: Oil on canvas, landscape painting
- Dimensions: 108 cm × 143.7 cm (43 in × 56.6 in)
- Location: National Gallery of Art; Washington, D.C.

The Junction of the Thames and the Medway is an 1807 landscape painting by the British artist J.M.W. Turner that depicts a meeting of the River Thames and the tributary the River Medway. Like many of Turner's nautical works of his early career it shows the influence of seventeenth century Dutch seascapes.

The work was one of a number of paintings that Turner displayed in his own studio gallery at Queen Anne Street in Marylebone rather than the Royal Academy's Summer Exhibition. Today the painting is in the National Gallery of Art in Washington D.C., having been acquired in 1942.

== See also ==
- List of paintings by J. M. W. Turner

== Bibliography ==
- Bailey, Anthony. J.M.W. Turner: Standing in the Sun. Tate Enterprises, 2013.
- Solkin, David. Turner and the Masters. Tate Britain, 2009.
- Spencer-Longhurst, Paul. The Sun Rising Through Vapour: Turner's Early Seascapes. Third Millennium Information, 2003.
- Tracy, Nicholas. Britannia’s Palette: The Arts of Naval Victory. McGill-Queen's Press, 2007.
