= Shipping by a Breakwater (J. M. W. Turner) =

Painting by J. M. W. Turner

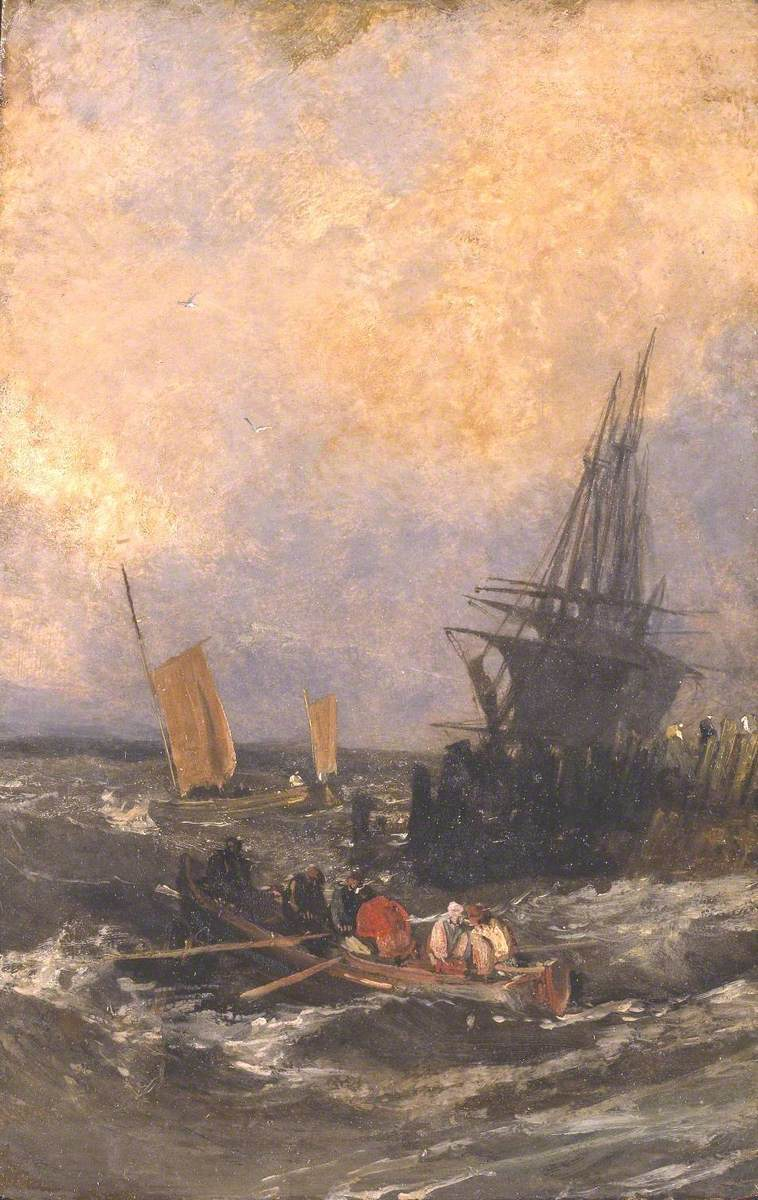
- Artist: J. M. W. Turner
- Year: c. 1798
- Medium: oil on canvas
- Dimensions: 19.4 cm × 30.2 cm (7.6 in × 11.9 in)
- Location: Tate Britain, London
- Website: www.tate.org.uk...n00469

Shipping by a Breakwater is a painting by J. M. W. Turner (23 April 1775 - 19 December 1851), painted c. 1798.

== See also ==
- List of paintings by J. M. W. Turner
- Catalogue Entry
