= The Fish Market at Hastings Beach =

Painting by J. M. W. Turner

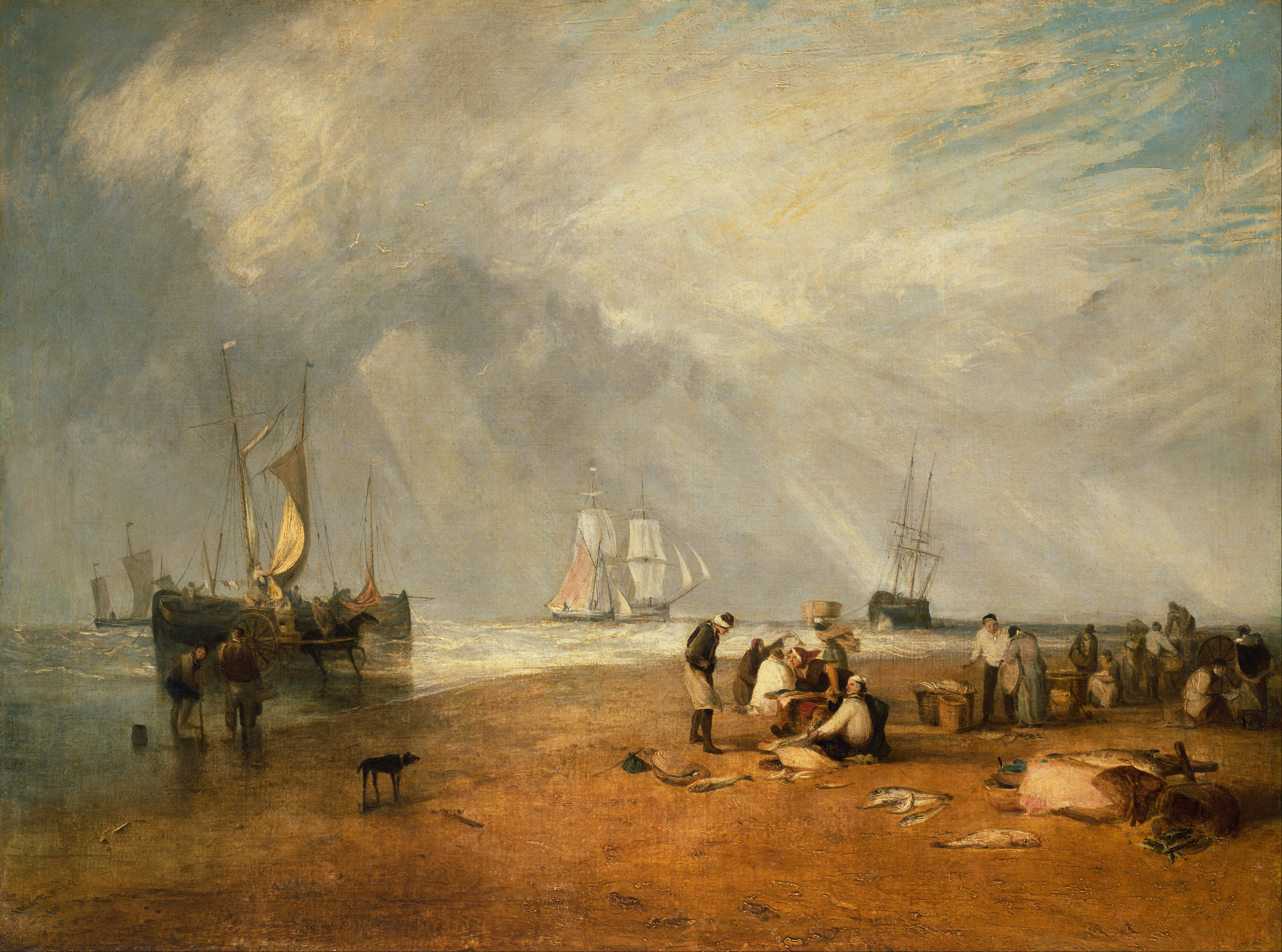
- Artist: J. M. W. Turner
- Year: 1810
- Type: Oil on canvas, landscape painting
- Dimensions: 90.8 cm × 120.6 cm (35.7 in × 47.5 in)
- Location: Nelson-Atkins Museum of Art; Kansas City

The Fish Market at Hastings Beach is an 1810 landscape painting by the British artist J.M.W. Turner. It features a view of the beach at Hastings in Sussex with fisherman selling their catch. Rather than display the work at the Royal Academy at Somerset House, Turner exhibited it in his own studio gallery in Queen Anne Street in Marylebone. It has similarities with Turner's The Sun Setting through Vapour. Originally commissioned by the politician Mad Jack Fuller, it is in the collection of the Nelson-Atkins Museum of Art in Kansas City, Missouri.

== See also ==
- List of paintings by J. M. W. Turner

== Bibliography ==
- Bailey, Anthony. J.M.W. Turner: Standing in the Sun. Tate Enterprises, 2013.
- Solkin, David. Turner and the Masters. Tate Britain, 2009.
- Spencer-Longhurst, Paul. The Sun Rising Through Vapour: Turner's Early Seascapes. Third Millennium Information, 2003.
- Tracy, Nicholas. Britannia’s Palette: The Arts of Naval Victory. McGill-Queen's Press, 2007.
