= Limekiln at Coalbrookdale (J. M. W. Turner) =

Painting by J. M. W. Turner

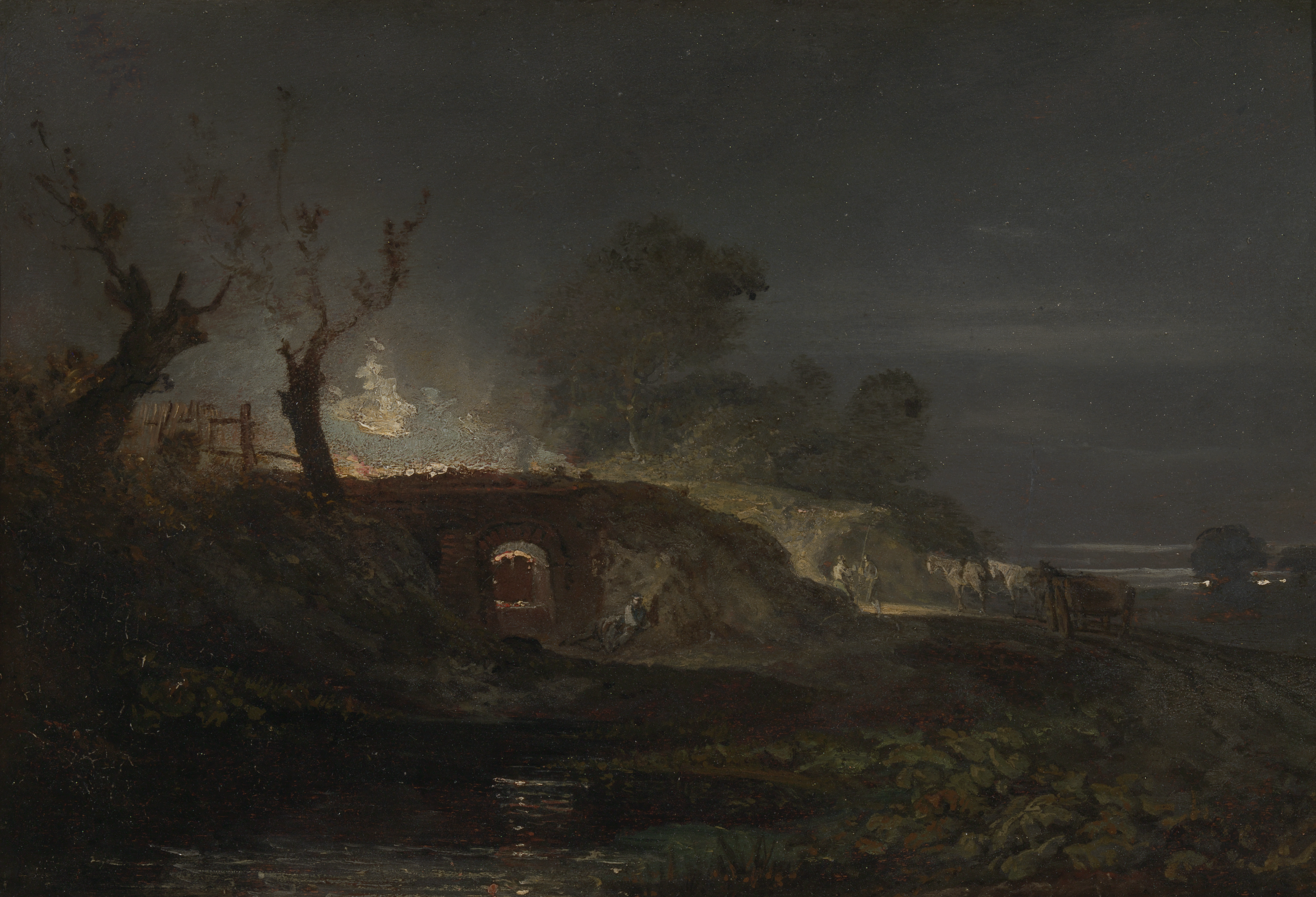
Limekiln at Coalbrookdale (c. 1797) by J. M. W. Turner

Limekiln at Coalbrookdale is an oil on panel painting by J. M. W. Turner, painted c. 1797. It is held at the Yale Center for British Art, in New Haven.

== See also ==
- List of paintings by J. M. W. Turner
