= Port Ruysdael =

Painting by J. M. W. Turner

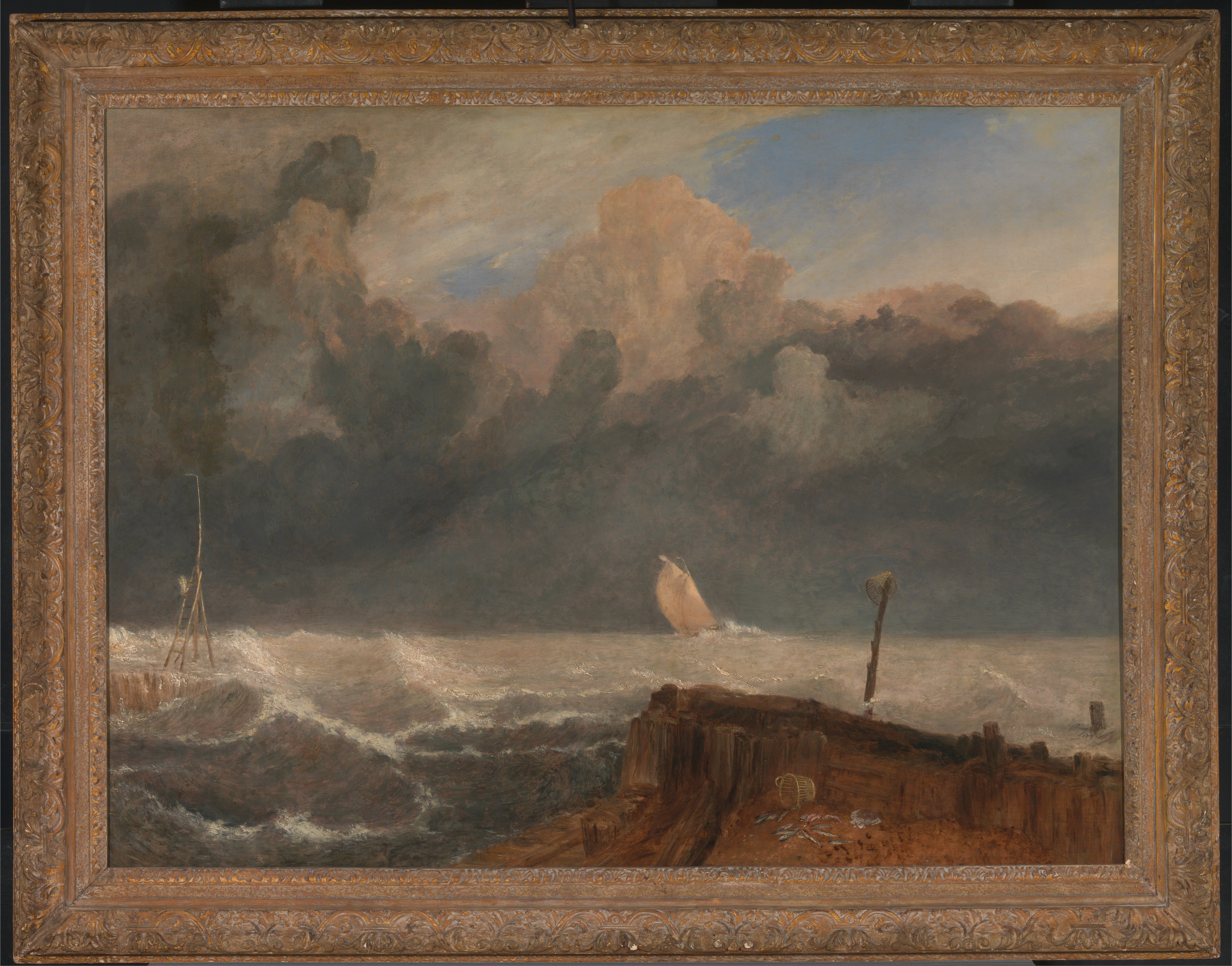
Port Ruysdael

Port Ruysdael is an 1826 oil on canvas painting by the English painter J. M. W. Turner. It is in the collection of the Yale Center for British Art in New Haven.

Turner painted this as a tribute to Dutch Golden Age painter Jacob van Ruisdael. There is no port by the name of Port Ruysdael. In 1844 he painted another tribute to Ruisdael, named Fishing Boats bringing a Disabled Ship into Port Ruysdael which is at the Tate Gallery in London.

The dimensions of the painting are 92 x 122 cm.

== See also ==
- List of paintings by J. M. W. Turner
