= Linlithgow Palace (painting) =

Painting by J. M. W. Turner

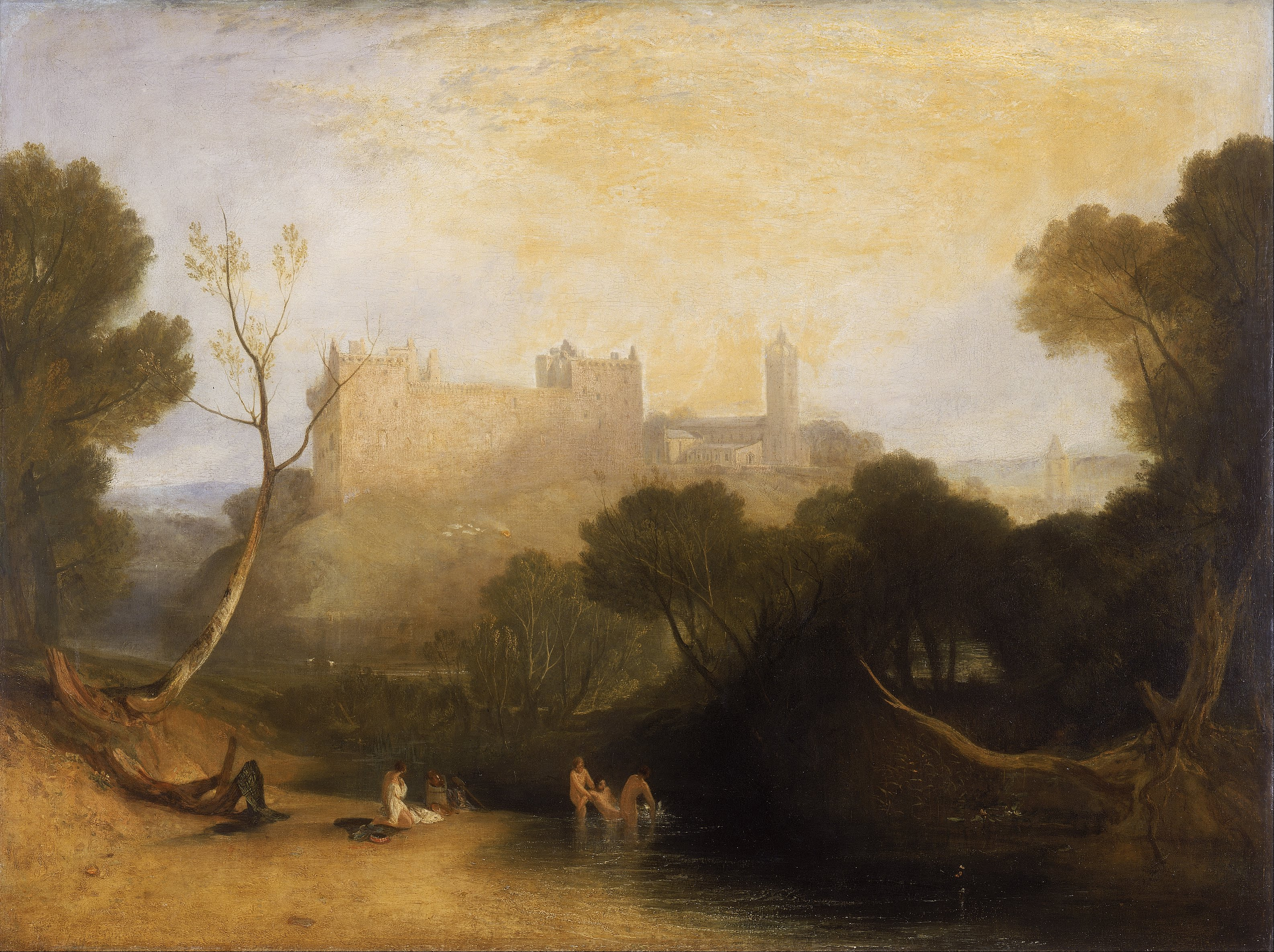
- Artist: J.M.W. Turner
- Year: c.1807
- Type: Oil on canvas, landscape painting
- Dimensions: 91.4 cm × 122 cm (36.0 in × 48 in)
- Location: Walker Art Gallery, Liverpool
- Website: www.liverpoolmuseums.org.uk/...palace

Linlithgow Palace is an 1807 landscape painting by the British artist J.M.W. Turner. It depicts Linlithgow Palace west of Edinburgh. Turner transforms the view of the Scottish landscape it into a classical scene rather than a topographical depiction, by including woman bathing nude in the river and exaggerating the perspective.

Turner had visited and sketched the area in 1801. He displayed the painting in his own studio gallery in Queen Anne Street in Marylebone rather than at the Royal Academy. The work is today in the Walker Art Gallery in Liverpool, having been in the collection since 1948. A sketch on which the picture is based is in the Fogg Art Museum.

== See also ==
- List of paintings by J. M. W. Turner

== Bibliography ==
- Bailey, Anthony. J.M.W. Turner: Standing in the Sun. Tate Enterprises Ltd, 2013.
- Bury, Stephen (ed.) Benezit Dictionary of British Graphic Artists and Illustrators, Volume 1. OUP, 2012.
- Hamilton, James. Turner's Britain. Merrell, 2003
- Reynolds, Graham. Turner. Thames & Hudson, 2022.
