= List of paintings by J. M. W. Turner =

Paintings by English artist William Turner

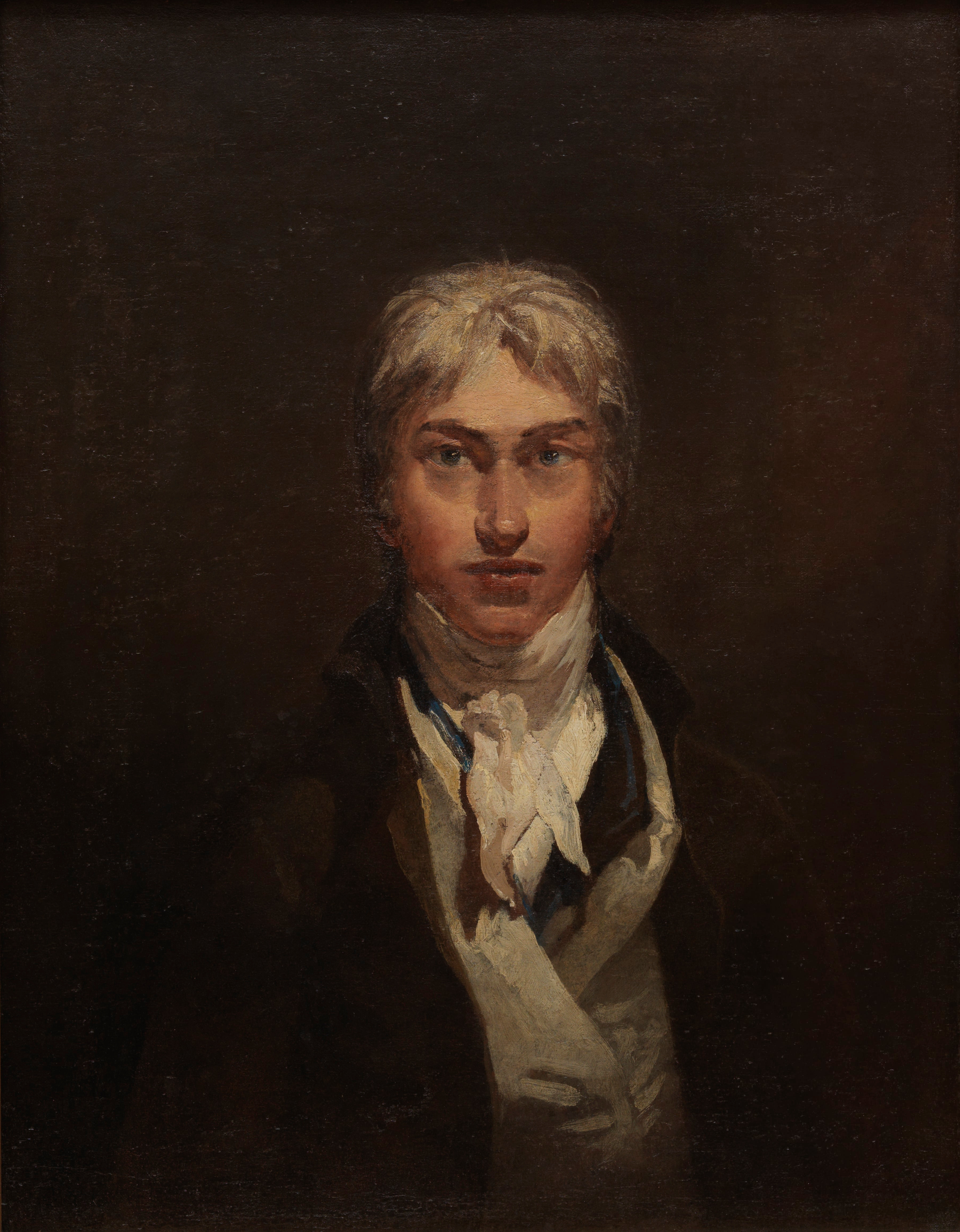
Self-Portrait, J. M. W. Turner (c. 1799)

This is an incomplete list of the oil paintings of J. M. W. Turner (23 April 1775 – 19 December 1851), a master noted for his skill in the portrayal of light, and in the painting of maritime scenes.

See M. W. Turner Catalogue Raisonné, 1982, Joll and Butlin for a complete catalogue of his works.

== Paintings ==
=== 1787–1801 Student ===
Table featuring paintings by J. M. W. Turner
| Image | Title | Year | Medium | Dimensions | Collection | Ref. |
|---|---|---|---|---|---|---|
| | Lambeth Palace | 1790 | Watercolor on white paper | 26.7 cm × 38.1 cm (10.5 in × 15.0 in) | Indianapolis Museum of Art, Indianapolis | |
| | Self-Portrait | 1791–1793 | Oil on canvas | 52.0 cm × 42.0 cm (20.5 in × 16.5 in) | Indianapolis Museum of Art, Indianapolis | |
| | The Rising Squall, Hot Wells | 1792 | Oil on canvas | 59.8 cm × 74 cm (23.5 in × 29.1 in) | Private collection | |
| | Landscape with Windmill and Rainbow (partly after Gainsborough) | c. 1795–1800 | Oil on canvas | 70.5 cm × 90.2 cm (27.8 in × 35.5 in) | Tate Britain, London | |
| | Interior of a Romanesque Church | c. 1795–1800 | Oil on mahogany | 61.0 cm × 50.2 cm (24.0 in × 19.8 in) | Tate Britain, London | |
| | Diana and Callisto (after Wilson) | c. 1796 | Oil on canvas | 56.5 cm × 91.4 cm (22.2 in × 36.0 in) | Tate Britain, London | |
| | Limekiln at Coalbrookdale | c. 1796–1797 | Oil on panel | 28.9 cm × 40.3 cm (11.4 in × 15.9 in) | Yale Center for British Art, New Haven | |
| | Interior of a Gothic Church | c. 1797 | Oil on mahogany | 27.9 cm × 40.6 cm (11.0 in × 16.0 in) | Tate Britain, London | |
| | Beech Trees at Norbury Park, Leatherhead, Surrey | c. 1797 | Graphite and watercolor on sheet lined with laid paper | 44.0 cm × 43.1 cm (17.3 in × 17.0 in) | National Gallery of Ireland, Dublin | |
| | Aeneas and the Sibyl, Lake Avernus | c. 1798 | Oil on canvas | 76.5 cm × 98.4 cm (30.1 in × 38.7 in) | Tate Britain, London | |
| | Caernarvon Castle | c. 1798 | Oil on pine | 15.2 cm × 23.2 cm (6.0 in × 9.1 in) | Tate Britain, London | |
| | Shipping by a Breakwater | c. 1798 | Oil on mahogany | 30.2 cm × 19.4 cm (11.9 in × 7.6 in) | Tate Britain, London | |
| | View of a Town | c. 1798 | Oil on canvas | 24.1 cm × 32.4 cm (9.5 in × 12.8 in) | Tate Britain, London | |
| | Dunstanburgh Castle | 1798 | Oil on canvas | 92.2 cm × 123.2 cm (36.3 in × 48.5 in) | National Gallery of Victoria, Melbourne | |
| | Tivoli and the Roman Campagna (after Wilson) | c. 1798 | Oil on canvas | 72.4 cm × 96.5 cm (28.5 in × 38.0 in) | Tate Britain, London | |
| | Plompton Rocks | c. 1798 | | | Harewood House, Yorkshire | |
| | Plompton Rocks | c. 1798 | | | Harewood House, Yorkshire | |
| | Kilgarren Castle, Pembrokeshire | 1798–1799 | Oil on canvas | 89.0 cm × 119.7 cm (35.0 in × 47.1 in) | Cragside, Rothbury | |
| | Self-Portrait | c. 1799 | Oil on canvas | 74.3 cm × 58.4 cm (29.3 in × 23.0 in) | Tate Britain, London | |
| | Harlech Castle, from Tygwyn Ferry, Summer's Evening Twilight | 1799 | Oil on canvas | 87.0 cm × 119.4 cm (34.3 in × 47.0 in) | Yale Center for British Art, Connecticut | |
| | View in Wales: Mountain Scene with Village and Castle - Evening | c. 1799–1800 | Oil on canvas | 58.1 cm × 72.7 cm (22.9 in × 28.6 in) | Tate Britain, London | |
| | A Beech Wood with Gypsies Seated in the Distance | c. 1799–1801 | Oil on canvas | 27.6 cm × 19.9 cm (10.9 in × 7.8 in) | Fitzwilliam Museum, Cambridge | |
| | A Beech Wood with Gypsies round a Campfire | c. 1799–1801 | Oil on paper | 38.6 cm × 30.9 cm (15.2 in × 12.2 in) | Fitzwilliam Museum, Cambridge | |
| | View on Clapham Common | c. 1800–1805 | Oil on wood | 32.1 cm × 44.5 cm (12.6 in × 17.5 in) | Tate Britain, London | |
| | Landscape with Lake and Fallen Tree | c. 1800 | Oil on canvas | 39.1 cm × 60.6 cm (15.4 in × 23.9 in) | Tate Britain, London | |
| | Dolbadern Castle | 1800 | Oil on canvas | 119.4 cm × 90.2 cm (47.0 in × 35.5 in) | The Royal Academy, London | |
| | The Fifth Plague of Egypt | 1800 | Oil on canvas | 122 cm × 183 cm (48.0 in × 72.0 in) | Indianapolis Museum of Art, Indianapolis | |
| | Dutch Boats in a Gale | 1801 | Oil on canvas | 162.5 cm × 221 cm (64.0 in × 87.0 in) | National Gallery, London | |

=== 1802–1818 Academician ===
Table featuring paintings by J. M. W. Turner
| Image | Title | Year | Medium | Dimensions | Collection | Ref. |
|---|---|---|---|---|---|---|
| | Jason | 1802 | | 90.2 cm × 119.7 cm (35.5 in × 47.1 in) | Tate Britain, London | |
| | Ben Lomond Mountains, Scotland | 1802 | | 64.1 cm × 98.8 cm (25.2 in × 38.9 in) | Fitzwilliam Museum, Cambridge | |
| | Fishermen Upon a Lee-Shore in Squally Weather | 1802 | | 91.5 cm × 122 cm (36.0 in × 48.0 in) | Southampton City Art Gallery | |
| | The Tenth Plague of Egypt | 1802 | | 143.5 cm × 236.2 cm (56.5 in × 93.0 in) | Tate Britain, London | |
| | Grenoble Seen from the River Drac with Mont Blanc in the Distance | 1802 | | 36.2 cm × 64.1 cm (14.3 in × 25.2 in) | Tate Britain, London | |
| | Ships Bearing Up for Anchorage | 1802 | | 112 cm × 18 cm (44.1 in × 7.1 in) | Petworth House, Petworth | |
| | Salisbury Cathedral from the Cloisters | 1802 | Watercolor on paper | 89.8 cm × 72.5 cm (35.4 in × 28.5 in) | Victoria and Albert Museum, London | |
| | Mountain Scene with Castle, Probably Martigny | 1802-1803 | | 43.8 cm × 54 cm (17.2 in × 21.3 in) | Tate Britain, London | |
| | Tummel Bridge, Perthshire | 1802-1803 | | 28.9 cm × 46.7 cm (11.4 in × 18.4 in) | Yale Center for British Art, Connecticut | |
| | Chateaux de St Michael, Bonneville, Savoy | 1802-1803 | | 91.4 cm × 121.9 cm (36.0 in × 48.0 in) | Yale Center for British Art, Connecticut | |
| | Bonneville, Savoy | 1803 | | 92.71 cm × 122.56 cm (36.50 in × 48.25 in) | Dallas Museum of Art, Dallas | |
| | St Huges Denouncing Vengeance on the Shepherd of Cormayer in the Valley of d'Aoust | 1803 | Watercolor on paper | 67.3 cm × 100.9 cm (26.5 in × 39.7 in) | Sir John Soane's Museum, London | |
| | A Coast Scene with Fishermen Hauling a Boat Ashore | 1803-1804 | | 91.8 cm × 122.5 cm (36.1 in × 48.2 in) | Kenwood House, London | |
| | The Festival of the Opening of the Vintage at Mâcon | 1803 | | 182.5 cm × 274.4 cm (71.9 in × 108.0 in) | Museums Sheffield | |
| | Holy Family | 1803 | | 102.2 cm × 141.6 cm (40.2 in × 55.7 in) | Tate Britain, London | |
| | Calais Pier, with French Poissards preparing for Sea: an English Packet arriving | 1803 | | 172 cm × 240 cm (68 in × 94 in) | National Gallery, London | |
| | Fishing Boats Entering Calais Harbour | 1803 | | 73.7 cm × 98.4 cm (29.0 in × 38.7 in) | Frick Collection, New York City | |
| | The Pass of Saint Gotthard, Switzerland | 1803–1804 | | 80.6 cm × 64.2 cm (31.7 in × 25.3 in) | Birmingham Museums Trust | |
| | Narcissus and Echo | 1804 | | 86.5 cm × 117 cm (34.1 in × 46.1 in) | Petworth House, Petworth | |
| | Old Margate Pier | 1804 | | | Private collection | |
| | The Devil's Bridge, St Gotthard Pass | 1804 | | | Private collection | |
| | Seascape with a Squall Coming Up | 1804 | | 45.7 cm × 60.9 cm (18.0 in × 24.0 in) | Fuji Art Museum, Tokyo | |
| | Boats Carrying Out Anchors to the Dutch Men of War | c. 1804 | | 101.6 cm × 130.81 cm (40.00 in × 51.50 in) | National Gallery of Art, Washington, D.C. | |
| | The Shipwreck | 1805 | | 170.5 cm × 241.6 cm (67.1 in × 95.1 in) | Tate Britain, London | |
| | Venus and Adonis | c. 1805 | | 149 cm × 119.4 cm (58.7 in × 47.0 in) | Private collection | |
| | Cattle in a Stream under a Bridge | 1805-1807 | | 31.4 cm × 39.4 cm (12.4 in × 15.5 in) | Tate Britain, London | |
| | Guildford from the Banks of the Wey | 1805 | | 25.4 cm × 19.7 cm (10.0 in × 7.8 in) | Tate Britain, London | |
| | Cows in a Landscape with a Footbridge | 1805-1807 | | 47.9 cm × 71.1 cm (18.9 in × 28.0 in) | Tate Britain, London | |
| | The Thames at Weybridge | 1805-1806 | | 90.5 cm × 121.7 cm (35.6 in × 47.9 in) | Petworth House, Petworth | |
| | Windsor Castle from the Thames | 1805 | | 91 cm × 122 cm (36 in × 48 in) | Petworth House, Petworth | |
| | Venus and the Dead Adonis | 1805? | | 31.8 cm × 45.1 cm (12.5 in × 17.8 in) | Tate Britain, London | |
| | The Deluge | 1805 | | 142.9 cm × 235.6 cm (56.3 in × 92.8 in) | Tate Britain, London | |
| | Windsor Castle from the Meadows | 1805 | | 22.2 cm × 55.6 cm (8.7 in × 21.9 in) | Tate Britain, London | |
| | Sunset on the River | 1805 | | 15.6 cm × 18.7 cm (6.1 in × 7.4 in) | Tate Britain, London | |
| | The Destruction of Sodom | 1805 | | 146 cm × 237.5 cm (57.5 in × 93.5 in) | Tate Britain, London | |
| | Walton Reach | 1805 | | 36.8 cm × 73.7 cm (14.5 in × 29.0 in) | Tate Britain, London | |
| | Windsor from Lower Hope | 1805 | | 32.1 cm × 73.7 cm (12.6 in × 29.0 in) | Tate Britain, London | |
| | Godalming from the South | 1805 | | 20.3 cm × 34.9 cm (8.0 in × 13.7 in) | Tate Britain, London | |
| | A Thames Backwater with Windsor Castle in the Distance | 1805 | | 86.7 cm × 121 cm (34.1 in × 47.6 in) | Tate Britain, London | |
| | Willows beside a Stream | 1805 | | 86 cm × 116.2 cm (33.9 in × 45.7 in) | Tate Britain, London | |
| | Fall of the Rhine at Schaffhausen | c. 1805-06 | | 148.6 cm × 239.7 cm (58.5 in × 94.4 in) | Museum of Fine Arts, Boston | |
| | The ‘Victory’ Returning from Trafalgar, in Three Positions | 1806 | | 67 cm × 100.3 cm (26.4 in × 39.5 in) | Yale Center for British Art, Connecticut | |
| | The Goddess of Discord Choosing the Apple of Contention in the Garden of the Hesperides | 1806 | | 155.3 cm × 218.4 cm (61.1 in × 86.0 in) | Tate Britain, London | |
| | Abingdon | 1806? | | 01.6 cm × 130.2 cm (0.63 in × 51.26 in) | Tate Britain, London | |
| | Walton Bridges | c. 1806 | | 91.2 cm × 122 cm (35.9 in × 48.0 in) | National Gallery of Victoria, Melbourne | |
| | Sun Rising through Vapour | pre 1807 | | 134 cm × 179.5 cm (52.8 in × 70.7 in) | National Gallery, London | |
| | Barge on the River, Sunset | 1806-1807 | | 85.1 cm × 116.2 cm (33.5 in × 45.7 in) | Tate Britain, London | |
| | Margate | 1806-1807 | | 85.7 cm × 116.2 cm (33.7 in × 45.7 in) | Tate Britain, London | |
| | Men with Horses Crossing a River | 1806-1807 | | 87.9 cm × 118.4 cm (34.6 in × 46.6 in) | Tate Britain, London | |
| | The Thames Glimpsed between Trees, possibly at Kew Bridge | 1806-1807 | | 91.1 cm × 121.6 cm (35.9 in × 47.9 in) | Tate Britain, London | |
| | Weir and Cattle | 1806-1807 | | 88.3 cm × 120 cm (34.8 in × 47.2 in) | Tate Britain, London | |
| | Washing Sheep | 1806-1807 | | 84.5 cm × 116.5 cm (33.3 in × 45.9 in) | Tate Britain, London | |
| | Sketch for 'Harvest Dinner, Kingston Bank' | 1806-1807 | | 61 cm × 91.4 cm (24.0 in × 36.0 in) | Tate Britain, London | |
| | Shipping at the Mouth of the Thames | 1806-1807 | | 85.7 cm × 116.8 cm (33.7 in × 46.0 in) | Tate Britain, London | |
| | Coast Scene with Fishermen and Boats | 1806-1807 | | 85.7 cm × 116.2 cm (33.7 in × 45.7 in) | Tate Britain, London | |
| | Caversham Bridge with Cattle in the Water | 1806-1807 | | 85.4 cm × 115.8 cm (33.6 in × 45.6 in) | Tate Britain, London | |
| | Goring Mill and Church | 1806-1807 | | 85.7 cm × 116.2 cm (33.7 in × 45.7 in) | Tate Britain, London | |
| | River Scene with Weir in Middle Distance | 1806-1807 | | 85.4 cm × 115.6 cm (33.6 in × 45.5 in) | Tate Britain, London | |
| | Hampton Court from the Thames | 1806-1807 | | 85.7 cm × 120 cm (33.7 in × 47.2 in) | Tate Britain, London | |
| | Trees beside the River, with Bridge in the Middle Distance | 1806-1807 | | 87.9 cm × 120.6 cm (34.6 in × 47.5 in) | Tate Britain, London | |
| | House beside the River, with Trees and Sheep | 1806-1807 | | 90.5 cm × 116.5 cm (35.6 in × 45.9 in) | Tate Britain, London | |
| | Newark Abbey | 1806-1807 | | 91.4 cm × 123.2 cm (36.0 in × 48.5 in) | Yale Center for British Art, Connecticut | |
| | Gipsy Camp | 1807 | | 121.9 cm × 91.4 cm (48.0 in × 36.0 in) | Tate Britain, London | |
| | Cassiobury Park: Reaping | 1807 | | 90.2 cm × 121.9 cm (35.5 in × 48.0 in) | Tate Britain, London | |
| | Newark Abbey | 1807 | | 29.5 cm × 35.2 cm (11.6 in × 13.9 in) | Tate Britain, London | |
| | Newark Abbey on the River Wey | 1807 | | 27.9 cm × 45.7 cm (11.0 in × 18.0 in) | Private collection | |
| | An Artists' Colourman's Workshop | 1807 | | 62.2 cm × 91.4 cm (24.5 in × 36.0 in) | Tate Britain, London | |
| | St Catherine's Hill, Guildford | 1807 | | 36.5 cm × 73.7 cm (14.4 in × 29.0 in) | Tate Britain, London | |
| | Linlithgow Palace | 1807 | | 92 cm × 122.5 cm (36.2 in × 48.2 in) | Walker Art Gallery, Liverpool | |
| | The Thames near Windsor | 1807 | | 18.7 cm × 26 cm (7.4 in × 10.2 in) | Petworth House, Petworth | |
| | The Junction of the Thames and the Medway | 1807 | | 108.8 cm × 143.7 cm (42.8 in × 56.6 in) | National Gallery of Art, Washington, D.C. | |
| | A Narrow Valley | 1807 | | 20.6 cm × 16.5 cm (8.1 in × 6.5 in) | Tate Britain, London | |
| | Newark Abbey on the Wey | 1807 | | 36.8 cm × 73.7 cm (14.5 in × 29.0 in) | Tate Britain, London | |
| | Windsor Castle from Salt Hill | 1807 | | 27.6 cm × 73.7 cm (10.9 in × 29.0 in) | Tate Britain, London | |
| | On the Thames (?) | 1807 | | 29.8 cm × 34.9 cm (11.7 in × 13.7 in) | Tate Britain, London | |
| | Windsor Castle from the River | 1807 | | 20 cm × 36.8 cm (7.9 in × 14.5 in) | Tate Britain, London | |
| | The Battle of Trafalgar, as Seen from the Mizen Starboard Shrouds of the Victory | 1806-1808 | | 170.8 cm × 238.8 cm (67.2 in × 94.0 in) | Tate Britain, London | |
| | Spithead: Two Captured Danish Ships Entering Portsmouth Harbour | 1807-1809 | | 171.4 cm × 233.7 cm (67.5 in × 92.0 in) | Tate Britain, London | |
| | Eton, from the River | 1807? | | 35.6 cm × 66 cm (14.0 in × 26.0 in) | Tate Britain, London | |
| | Tree Tops and Sky, Guildford Castle(?), Evening | 1807? | | 27.6 cm × 73.7 cm (10.9 in × 29.0 in) | Tate Britain, London | |
| | Cliveden on Thames | 1807? | | 28.4 cm × 58.4 cm (11.2 in × 23.0 in) | Tate Britain, London | |
| | A Country Blacksmith | 1807? | | 54.9 cm × 77.8 cm (21.6 in × 30.6 in) | Tate Britain, London | |
| | The Thames near Windsor | 1807? | | 89 cm × 119.5 cm (35.0 in × 47.0 in) | Tate Britain, London | |
| | The Raft | 1807 | | 41 cm × 59 cm (16 in × 23 in) | Tate Britain, London | |
| | The Unpaid Bill | 1808 | | 59.4 cm × 80 cm (23.4 in × 31.5 in) | Private collection | |
| | The Thames at Eton | 1808 | | 60.5 cm × 90.5 cm (23.8 in × 35.6 in) | Petworth House, Petworth | |
| | Margate | 1808 | | 90 cm × 120.5 cm (35.4 in × 47.4 in) | Petworth House, Petworth | |
| | The Forest of Bere | 1808 | | 89 cm × 119.5 cm (35.0 in × 47.0 in) | Petworth House, Petworth | |
| | Purfleet and the Essex Shore as Seen from Long Reach | 1808 | | 89.5 cm × 120 cm (35.2 in × 47.2 in) | Private collection | |
| | Tabley, Cheshire, the Seat of Sir J. F. Leicester, Bt: Windy Day | 1808 | | 91.5 × W 120.6 | Tabley House, Knutsford | |
| | Pope's Villa at Twickenham | 1808 | | 92 cm × 122.5 cm (36.2 in × 48.2 in) | Private collection | |
| | View of Richmond Hill and Bridge | 1808 | | 91.4 cm × 121.9 cm (36.0 in × 48.0 in) | Tate Britain, London | |
| | A Subject from the Runic Superstitions ... | 1808 | | 92.1 cm × 121.9 cm (36.3 in × 48.0 in) | Tate Britain, London | |
| | Union of the Thames and Isis ('Dorchester Mead, Oxfordshire') | 1808 | | 90.8 cm × 121.3 cm (35.7 in × 47.8 in) | Tate Britain, London | |
| | Sheerness as Seen from the Nore | 1808 | | 140.5 cm × 149.5 cm (55.3 in × 58.9 in) | Museum of Fine Arts, Houston | |
| | The Confluence of the Thames and the Medway | 1808 | | 91 cm × 12 cm (35.8 in × 4.7 in) | Petworth House, Petworth | |
| | Near the Thames' Lock, Windsor | 1809 | | 89 cm × 118 cm (35 in × 46 in) | Petworth House, Petworth | |
| | Harvest Home | 1809 | | 90.5 cm × 120.3 cm (35.6 in × 47.4 in) | Tate Britain, London | |
| | The Sun Setting through Vapour | 1809 | | 69.2 cm × 101.6 cm (27.2 in × 40.0 in) | Barber Institute of Fine Arts, Birmingham | |
| | Shoeburyness Fishermen Hailing a Whitstable Hoy | 1809 | | 91.5 cm × 122 cm (36.0 in × 48.0 in) | National Gallery of Canada, Ottawa | |
| | The Trout Stream | 1809 | | | Taft Museum of Art, Cincinnati | |
| | Tabley, Cheshire, the Seat of Sir J. F. Leicester, Bart.: Calm Morning | 1809 | | 91 cm × 121.5 cm (35.8 in × 47.8 in) | Petworth House, Petworth | |
| | Ploughing Up Turnips, near Slough ('Windsor') | 1809 | | 101.9 cm × 130.2 cm (40.1 in × 51.3 in) | Tate Britain, London | |
| | Sketch of a Bank, with Gipsies | 1809 | | 61.3 cm × 83.8 cm (24.1 in × 33.0 in) | Tate Britain, London | |
| | London from Greenwich Park | 1809 | | 90.2 cm × 120 cm (35.5 in × 47.2 in) | Tate Britain, London | |
| | Thomson's Aeolian Harp | 1809 | | 166.7 cm × 306 cm (65.6 in × 120.5 in) | Manchester Art Gallery | |
| | Fishing upon the Blythe-Sand, Tide Setting In | 1809 | | 88.9 cm × 119.4 cm (35.0 in × 47.0 in) | Tate Britain, London | |
| | View of the High Street, Oxford | 1809-1810 | | 68.6 cm × 99.7 cm (27.0 in × 39.3 in) | Ashmolean Museum, Oxford | |
| | Harvest Dinner, Kingston Bank | 1809 | | 90.2 cm × 121 cm (35.5 in × 47.6 in) | Tate Britain, London | |
| | The Quiet Ruin, Cattle in Water; A Sketch, Evening | 1809 | | 61.2 cm × 76.5 cm (24.1 in × 30.1 in) | Tate Britain, London | |
| | The Garreteer's Petition | 1809 | | 55.2 cm × 79.1 cm (21.7 in × 31.1 in) | Tate Britain, London | |
| | River Scene with Cattle | 1810 | | 128.3 cm × 174 cm (50.5 in × 68.5 in) | Tate Britain, London | |
| | Lowther Castle, Midday | 1810 | | | Private collection | |
| | Lowther Castle, Evening | 1810 | | | Bowes Museum, County Durham | |
| | The Fall of an Avalanche in the Grisons | 1810 | | H 90.2 cm × 120 cm (35.5 in × 47.2 in) | Tate Britain, London | |
| | The Wreck of a Transport Ship | 1810 | | 173 cm × 245 cm (68 in × 96 in) | Calouste Gulbenkian Museum, Lisbon | |
| | Petworth, Sussex, the Seat of the Earl of Egremont: Dewy Morning | 1810 | | 91.5 cm × 120.5 cm (36.0 in × 47.4 in) | Petworth House, Petworth | |
| | Cockermouth Castle | 1810 | | 60.5 cm × 90 cm (23.8 in × 35.4 in) | Petworth House, Petworth | |
| | Lake of Geneva from Montreux | 1810 | | 102.8 cm × 162.5 cm (40.5 in × 64.0 in) | Los Angeles County Museum of Art | |
| | The Fish Market at Hastings Beach | 1810 | | 90.8 cm × 120.7 cm (35.7 in × 47.5 in) | Nelson-Atkins Museum of Art | |
| | Mercury and Herse | 1811 | | | Private collection | |
| | Saltash with the Water Ferry | 1811 | | 89.9 cm × 120.7 cm (35.4 in × 47.5 in) | Metropolitan Museum of Art, New York City | |
| | Apollo and Python | 1811 | | 145.4 cm × 237.5 cm (57.2 in × 93.5 in) | Tate Britain, London | |
| | Somer Hill, Tonbridge | 1811 | | 92 cm × 122 cm (36 in × 48 in)` | National Galleries of Scotland | |
| | Whalley Bridge and Abbey | 1811 | | 61.2 cm × 92 cm (24.1 in × 36.2 in) | Private collection | |
| | St Mawes at the Pilchard Season | 1812 | | 91.1 cm × 120.6 cm (35.9 in × 47.5 in) | Tate Britain, London | |
| | Snow Storm: Hannibal and his Army Crossing the Alps | 1812 | | 146 cm × 237.5 cm (57.5 in × 93.5 in) | Tate Britain, London | |
| | Hulks on the Tamar | 1812 | | 89.2 cm × 120.2 cm (35.1 in × 47.3 in) | Petworth House, Petworth | |
| | Teignmouth | 1812 | | 90 cm × 120.5 cm (35.4 in × 47.4 in) | Petworth House, Petworth | |
| | Frosty Morning | 1813 | | 113.7 cm × 174.6 cm (44.8 in × 68.7 in) | Tate Britain, London | |
| | Apullia in Search of Appullus | 1814 | | 148.5 cm × 241 cm (58.5 in × 94.9 in) | Tate Britain, London | |
| | Dido and Aeneas | 1814 | | 146 cm × 237 cm (57 in × 93 in) | Tate Britain, London | |
| | Lake Avernus: Aeneas and the Cumaean Sibyl | 1814- 15 | | 71.8 cm × 97.2 cm (28.3 in × 38.3 in) | Yale Center for British Art, Connecticut | |
| | Crossing the Brook | 1815 | | 193 cm × 165.1 cm (76.0 in × 65.0 in) | Tate Britain, London | |
| | Dido building Carthage or The Rise of the Carthaginian Empire | 1815 | | 155.5 cm × 230 cm (61.2 in × 90.6 in) | National Gallery, London | |
| | The Eruption of the Soufrière Mountains in the Island of St Vincent, 30 April 1812 | 1815 | | 79 cm × 105 cm (31 in × 41 in) | Victoria Gallery, Liverpool | |
| | The Temple of Jupiter Restored | 1816 | | 116.8 cm × 177.8 cm (46.0 in × 70.0 in) | Private collection | |
| | The Decline of the Carthaginian Empire | 1817 | | 170.2 cm × 238.8 cm (67.0 in × 94.0 in) | Tate Britain, London | |
| | Raby Castle | 1817 | | 119 cm × 180.6 cm (46.9 in × 71.1 in) | Walters Art Museum, Baltimore | |
| | A First Rate Taking in Stores | 1818 | Pencil and watercolor on paper | 28.6 cm × 39.7 cm (11.3 in × 15.6 in) | Higgins Art Gallery, Bedford | |
| | The Field of Waterloo | 1818 | | 147.3 cm × 238.8 cm (58.0 in × 94.0 in) | Tate Britain, London | |
| | Dort or Dordrecht | 1818 | | 157.5 cm × 233.7 cm (62.0 in × 92.0 in) | Yale Center for British Art, Connecticut | |

=== 1819–1835 Extensive wanderer ===
Table featuring paintings by J. M. W. Turner
| Image | Title | Year | Medium | Dimensions | Collection | Ref. |
|---|---|---|---|---|---|---|
| | Richmond Hill with Girls Carrying Corn | 1819 | | 48 cm × 239.3 cm (18.9 in × 94.2 in) | Tate Britain, London | |
| | Entrance of the Meuse | 1819 | | 175.3 cm × 246.4 cm (69.0 in × 97.0 in) | Tate Britain, London | |
| | England: Richmond Hill, on the Prince Regent's Birthday | 1819 | | 180 cm × 334.6 cm (70.9 in × 131.7 in) | Tate Britain, London | |
| | The Rialto, Venice | 1820 | | 177.5 cm × 335.3 cm (69.9 in × 132.0 in) | Tate Britain, London | |
| | Tynemouth Priory | 1820-1825 | | 31.8 cm × 61 cm (12.5 in × 24.0 in) | Tate Britain, London | |
| | Rome from the Vatican | 1820 | | 177.2 cm × 335.3 cm (69.8 in × 132.0 in) | Tate Britain, London | |
| | George IV at St Giles's, Edinburgh | 1822 | | 74.6 cm × 91.8 cm (29.4 in × 36.1 in) | Tate Britain, London | |
| | George IV at the Provost's Banquet in the Parliament House, Edinburgh | 1822 | | 68.6 cm × 91.8 cm (27.0 in × 36.1 in) | Tate Britain, London | |
| | George IV's Departure from the 'Royal George', 1822 | 1822 | | 75.2 cm × 92.1 cm (29.6 in × 36.3 in) | Tate Britain, London | |
| | An Avenue of Trees | 1822 | | 49.5 cm × 53.7 cm (19.5 in × 21.1 in) | Tate Britain, London | |
| | What You Will! | 1822 | | 49.8 cm × 54.3 cm (19.6 in × 21.4 in) | Clark Art Institute, Massachusetts | |
| | The Battle of Trafalgar, 21 October 1805 | 1822-1824 | | 261.5 cm × 368.5 cm (103.0 in × 145.1 in) | National Maritime Museum, London | |
| | The Bay of Baiae, with Apollo and the Sibyl | 1823 | | 145.4 cm × 237.5 cm (57.2 in × 93.5 in) | Tate Britain, London | |
| | First Sketch for 'The Battle of Trafalgar' | 1823 | | 90.2 cm × 121.3 cm (35.5 in × 47.8 in) | Tate Britain, London | |
| | Second Sketch for 'The Battle of Trafalgar' | 1823 | | 90.2 cm × 121.3 cm (35.5 in × 47.8 in) | Tate Britain, London | |
| | Landscape: Christ and the Woman of Samaria | 1825 | | 147.3 cm × 238.8 cm (58.0 in × 94.0 in) | Tate Britain, London | |
| | The Cobbler's Home | 1825 | | 59.7 cm × 80 cm (23.5 in × 31.5 in) | Tate Britain, London | |
| | Valley with a Distant Bridge and Tower | 1825 | | 91.1 cm × 122.2 cm (35.9 in × 48.1 in) | Tate Britain, London | |
| | Lake or River with Trees on the Right | 1825-1830 | | 41.3 cm × 59.7 cm (16.3 in × 23.5 in) | Tate Britain, London | |
| | Death on a Pale Horse (?) | 1825-1830 | | 59.7 cm × 75.6 cm (23.5 in × 29.8 in) | Tate Britain, London | |
| | Shipping | 1825-1830 | | 67.9 cm × 91.8 cm (26.7 in × 36.1 in) | Tate Britain, London | |
| | Rocky Coast | 1825-1830 | | 50.2 cm × 65.7 cm (19.8 in × 25.9 in) | Tate Britain, London | |
| | Seascape with a Sailing Boat and a Ship | 1825-1830 | | 46.7 cm × 61 cm (18.4 in × 24.0 in) | Tate Britain, London | |
| | A Sandy Beach | 1825-1830 | | 60 cm × 91.4 cm (23.6 in × 36.0 in) | Tate Britain, London | |
| | Italian Landscape with a Tower | 1825-1830 | | 58.4 cm × 76.2 cm (23.0 in × 30.0 in) | Tate Britain, London | |
| | Seascape with a Yacht (?) | 1825-1830 | | 50.2 cm × 66 cm (19.8 in × 26.0 in) | Tate Britain, London | |
| | Two Compositions: A Claudian Seaport and an Open Landscape | 1825-1830 | | 33.7 cm × 60.3 cm (13.3 in × 23.7 in) | Tate Britain, London | |
| | Forum Romanum | 1826 | | 145.7 cm × 236.3 cm (57.4 in × 93.0 in) | Tate Britain, London | |
| | The Harbour of Dieppe | 1826 | | 173.7 cm × 225.4 cm (68.4 in × 88.7 in) | Frick Collection, New York City | |
| | Cologne, the Arrival of a Packet Boat in the Evening | 1826 | | 168.6 cm × 224.2 cm (66.4 in × 88.3 in) | Frick Collection, New York City | |
| | Mortlake Terrace: Early Summer Morning | 1826 | | 93 cm × 123.2 cm (36.6 in × 48.5 in) | Frick Collection, New York City | |
| | View from the Terrace of a Villa at Niton, Isle of Wight, from Sketches by a Lady | 1826 | | 45.7 cm × 61 cm (18.0 in × 24.0 in) | Museum of Fine Arts, Boston | |
| | Port Ruysdael | 1826-27 | | 92.1 cm × 122.6 cm (36.3 in × 48.3 in) | Yale Center for British Art, Connecticut | |
| | The Harbour of Brest: The Quayside and Château | 1826-1828 | | 172.7 cm × 223.5 cm (68.0 in × 88.0 in) | Tate Britain, London | |
| | Dieppe: The Port from the Quai Henri IV | 1827-28 | | 60.3 cm × 89.2 cm (23.7 in × 35.1 in) | Tate Britain, London | |
| | Between Decks | 1827 | | 30.5 cm × 48.6 cm (12.0 in × 19.1 in) | Tate Britain, London | |
| | Sketch for 'East Cowes Castle, the Regatta Beating to Windward' No. 1 | 1827 | | 29.8 cm × 48.9 cm (11.7 in × 19.3 in) | Tate Britain, London | |
| | Sketch for 'East Cowes Castle, the Regatta Beating to Windward' No. 2 | 1827 | | 45.7 cm × 61 cm (18.0 in × 24.0 in) | Tate Britain, London | |
| | Sketch for 'East Cowes Castle, the Regatta Beating to Windward' No 3 | 1827 | | 46.4 cm × 72.4 cm (18.3 in × 28.5 in) | Tate Britain, London | |
| | A Sail Boat at Rouen | 1827-28 | | 60.3 cm × 90.8 cm (23.7 in × 35.7 in) | Tate Britain, London | |
| | Brighton Beach, with the Chain Pier in the Distance, from the West | 1827 | | 90.2 cm × 121.9 cm (35.5 in × 48.0 in) | Tate Britain, London | |
| | 'Now for the Painter' (Rope) – Passengers Going on Board | 1827 | | 174.3 cm × 223.5 cm (68.6 in × 88.0 in) | Manchester Art Gallery, Manchester | |
| | Scene in Derbyshire | 1827 | | 45 cm × 61 cm (18 in × 24 in) | Musée national des beaux-arts du Québec | |
| | Sketch for 'East Cowes Castle, the Regatta Starting for Their Moorings' No. 1 | 1827 | | 46.4 cm × 61.6 cm (18.3 in × 24.3 in) | Tate Britain, London | |
| | Sketch for 'East Cowes Castle, the Regatta Starting for Their Moorings' No. 2 | 1827 | | 44.5 cm × 73.7 cm (17.5 in × 29.0 in) | Tate Britain, London | |
| | Sketch for 'East Cowes Castle, the Regatta Starting for Their Moorings' No. 3 | 1827 | | 45.1 cm × 61 cm (17.8 in × 24.0 in) | Tate Britain, London | |
| | Shipping off East Cowes Headland | 1827 | | 46 cm × 60.3 cm (18.1 in × 23.7 in) | Tate Britain, London | |
| | Study of Sea and Sky, Isle of Wight | 1827 | | 32.1 cm × 50.2 cm (12.6 in × 19.8 in) | Tate Britain, London | |
| | Rouen: A View from the Left Bank in the Faubourg St-Sever | 1827-28 | | 60.3 cm × 98.7 cm (23.7 in × 38.9 in) | Tate Britain, London | |
| | Three Seascapes | 1827 | | 90.8 cm × 60.3 cm (35.7 in × 23.7 in) | Tate Britain, London | |
| | Mortlake Terrace | 1827 | | 92.1 cm × 122.2 cm (36.3 in × 48.1 in) | National Gallery of Art, Washington, D.C. | |
| | Rembrandt's Daughter | 1827 | | 159.4 cm × 127 cm (62.8 in × 50.0 in) | Fogg Museum | |
| | Rocky Bay | 1827-28 | | 60.3 cm × 92.1 cm (23.7 in × 36.3 in) | Tate Britain, London | |
| | Rouen: The Left Bank, with Shipping Beyond | 1827-28 | | 60 cm × 84.8 cm (23.6 in × 33.4 in) | Tate Britain, London | |
| | Italian Bay | 1827-28 | | 60.3 cm × 102.2 cm (23.7 in × 40.2 in) | Tate Britain, London | |
| | Landscape with Tower, Trees and Figures; possibly Arcueil near Paris | 1827-28 | | 60 cm × 88.6 cm (23.6 in × 34.9 in) | Tate Britain, London | |
| | Classical Harbour Scene; possibly based on Le Havre | 1827-28 | | 60.3 cm × 101.9 cm (23.7 in × 40.1 in) | Tate Britain, London | |
| | Tivoli, the Cascatelle | 1827-28 | | 60.7 cm × 77.7 cm (23.9 in × 30.6 in) | Tate Britain, London | |
| | The Lake, Petworth, Sunset; Sample Study | 1827-28 | | 63.5 cm × 139.7 cm (25.0 in × 55.0 in) | Tate Britain, London | |
| | Italian Landscape with Bridge and Tower | 1827-28 | | 60.3 cm × 98.1 cm (23.7 in × 38.6 in) | Tate Britain, London | |
| | The Lake, Petworth, Sunrise | 1827-28 | | 64.8 cm × 125.7 cm (25.5 in × 49.5 in) | Tate Britain, London | |
| | Rocky Bay with Figures | 1827-28 | | 90.2 cm × 123.2 cm (35.5 in × 48.5 in) | Tate Britain, London | |
| | Archway with Trees by the Sea; Sketch for 'The Parting of Hero and Leander' | 1827-28 | | 59.4 cm × 87 cm (23.4 in × 34.3 in) | Tate Britain, London | |
| | Lake Nemi | 1827-28 | | 60.3 cm × 99.7 cm (23.7 in × 39.3 in) | Tate Britain, London | |
| | Overlooking the Coast, with Classical Building | 1827-28 | | 60.3 cm × 84.5 cm (23.7 in × 33.3 in) | Tate Britain, London | |
| | A Ship Aground, Yarmouth; Sample Study | 1827-28 | | 69.8 cm × 135.9 cm (27.5 in × 53.5 in) | Tate Britain, London | |
| | Claudian Composition, possibly Arcueil at Dawn (formerly titled 'Ariccia (?): Sunset') | 1827-28 | | 60.6 cm × 79.4 cm (23.9 in × 31.3 in) | Tate Britain, London | |
| | Sketch for 'Ulysses Deriding Polyphemus' | 1827-28 | | 60 cm × 89.2 cm (23.6 in × 35.1 in) | Tate Britain, London | |
| | East Cowes Castle | 1827-28 | | 91.4 cm × 123.2 cm (36.0 in × 48.5 in) | Victoria and Albert Museum, London | |
| | East Cowes Castle, the Regatta Beating to Windward | 1828 | | 90.2 cm × 120.7 cm (35.5 in × 47.5 in) | Indianapolis Museum of Art, Indiana | |
| | The Chain Pier, Brighton | 1828 | | 71.1 cm × 136.5 cm (28.0 in × 53.7 in) | Tate Britain, London | |
| | Petworth Park: Tillington Church in the Distance | 1828 | | 60 cm × 145.7 cm (23.6 in × 57.4 in) | Tate Britain, London | |
| | Chichester Canal | 1828 | | 65.4 cm × 134.6 cm (25.7 in × 53.0 in) | Tate Britain, London | |
| | The Rest on the Flight into Egypt | 1828 | | 150.5 cm × 111.8 cm (59.3 in × 44.0 in) | Tate Britain, London | |
| | The Procuress; (?) Judith with the Head of Holofernes | 1828 | | 124.1 cm × 91.4 cm (48.9 in × 36.0 in) | Tate Britain, London | |
| | Coast Scene near Naples | 1828 | | 41 cm × 59.7 cm (16.1 in × 23.5 in) | Tate Britain, London | |
| | Hilly Landscape with Tower | 1828 | | 42.2 cm × 52.4 cm (16.6 in × 20.6 in) | Tate Britain, London | |
| | Reclining Venus | 1828 | | 75.3 cm × 248.9 cm (29.6 in × 98.0 in) | Tate Britain, London | |
| | Seacoast with Ruin, probably the Bay of Baiae | 1828 | | 41.3 cm × 60.3 cm (16.3 in × 23.7 in) | Tate Britain, London | |
| | Regulus | 1828 | | 89.5 cm × 123.8 cm (35.2 in × 48.7 in) | Tate Britain, London | |
| | Palestrina - Composition | 1828 | | 140.3 cm × 248.9 cm (55.2 in × 98.0 in) | Tate Britain, London | |
| | Boccaccio Relating the Tale of the Bird-Cage | 1828 | | 121.9 cm × 89.9 cm (48.0 in × 35.4 in) | Tate Britain, London | |
| | Hill Town on the Edge of the Campagna | 1828 | | 41 cm × 59.4 cm (16.1 in × 23.4 in) | Tate Britain, London | |
| | A Seashore | 1828 | | 41.6 cm × 52.1 cm (16.4 in × 20.5 in) | Tate Britain, London | |
| | Seascape with Burning Hulk | 1828 | | 24.1 cm × 41.6 cm (9.5 in × 16.4 in) | Tate Britain, London | |
| | Vision of Medea | 1828 | | 173.7 cm × 248.9 cm (68.4 in × 98.0 in) | Tate Britain, London | |
| | Seascape | 1828 | | 41.9 cm × 52.1 cm (16.5 in × 20.5 in) | Tate Britain, London | |
| | Landscape with a Tree on the Right | 1828 | | 27.9 cm × 41.6 cm (11.0 in × 16.4 in) | Tate Britain, London | |
| | Outline of a Venus Pudica | 1828 | | 135.6 cm × 98.1 cm (53.4 in × 38.6 in) | Tate Britain, London | |
| | Italian Landscape, probably Civita di Bagnoregio | 1828 | | 149.9 cm × 249.6 cm (59.0 in × 98.3 in) | Tate Britain, London | |
| | Landscape with Trees and a Castle | 1828 | | 41.6 cm × 60 cm (16.4 in × 23.6 in) | Tate Britain, London | |
| | Southern Landscape with an Aqueduct and Waterfall | 1828 | | 50.2 cm × 249.2 cm (19.8 in × 98.1 in) | Tate Britain, London | |
| | Southern Landscape | 1828 | | 176.5 cm × 251.8 cm (69.5 in × 99.1 in) | Tate Britain, London | |
| | View of Orvieto | 1828 | | 91.4 cm × 123.2 cm (36.0 in × 48.5 in) | Tate Britain, London | |
| | Mountainous Landscape | 1828 | | 41.3 cm × 59.7 cm (16.3 in × 23.5 in) | Tate Britain, London | |
| | Two Recumbent Nude Figures | 1828 | | 174.6 cm × 249.2 cm (68.7 in × 98.1 in) | Tate Britain, London | |
| | The Banks of the Loire | 1829 | | 71.3 cm × 53.3 cm (28.1 in × 21.0 in) | Worcester Art Museum, Massachusetts | |
| | Chichester Canal | 1829 | | 63.5 cm × 132 cm (25.0 in × 52.0 in) | Petworth House, Petworth | |
| | The Lake, Petworth: Sunset, a Stag Drinking | 1829 | | 63.5 cm × 132 cm (25.0 in × 52.0 in) | Petworth House, Petworth | |
| | The Lake, Petworth: Sunset, Fighting Bucks | 1829 | | 62 cm × 146 cm (24 in × 57 in) | Petworth House, Petworth | |
| | Brighton from the Sea | 1829 | | 63.5 cm × 132 cm (25.0 in × 52.0 in) | Petworth House, Petworth | |
| | The Loretto Necklace | 1829 | | 130.8 cm × 174.9 cm (51.5 in × 68.9 in) | Tate Britain, London | |
| | Ulysses Deriding Polyphemus- Homer's Odyssey | 1829 | | 132.5 cm × 203 cm (52.2 in × 79.9 in) | National Gallery, London | |
| | Pilate Washing his Hands | 1830 | | 91.4 cm × 121.9 cm (36.0 in × 48.0 in) | Tate Britain, London | |
| | A Lady in a Van Dyck Costume | 1830-1835 | | 121.3 cm × 91.1 cm (47.8 in × 35.9 in) | Tate Britain, London | |
| | Dinner in a Great Room with Figures in Costume | 1830-1835 | | 90.8 cm × 121.9 cm (35.7 in × 48.0 in) | Tate Britain, London | |
| | The Evening Star | 1830 | | 91.1 cm × 122.6 cm (35.9 in × 48.3 in) | National Gallery, London | |
| | Funeral of Sir Thomas Lawrence | 1830 | | | Tate Britain, London | |
| | Scene in a Church or Vaulted Hall | 1830 | | 74.9 cm × 99.1 cm (29.5 in × 39.0 in) | Tate Britain, London | |
| | Sunset | 1830-1835 | | 66.7 cm × 81.9 cm (26.3 in × 32.2 in) | Tate Britain, London | |
| | The Thames above Waterloo Bridge | 1830-1835 | | 90.5 cm × 121 cm (35.6 in × 47.6 in) | Tate Britain, London | |
| | Figures in a Building | 1830-1835 | | 91.4 cm × 121.9 cm (36.0 in × 48.0 in) | Tate Britain, London | |
| | Interior of a Great House: The Drawing Room, East Cowes Castle | 1830 | | 90.8 cm × 121.9 cm (35.7 in × 48.0 in) | Tate Britain, London | |
| | The Vision of Jacob's Ladder (?) | 1830 | | 123.2 cm × 188 cm (48.5 in × 74.0 in) | Tate Britain, London | |
| | Two Women with a Letter | 1830 | | 121.9 cm × 91.4 cm (48.0 in × 36.0 in) | Tate Britain, London | |
| | Jessica | 1830 | | 122 cm × 91.5 cm (48.0 in × 36.0 in) | Petworth House, Petworth | |
| | Calais Sands at Low Water: Poissards Collecting Bait | 1830 | | 68.5 cm × 105.5 cm (27.0 in × 41.5 in) | Bury Art Museum | |
| | Lifeboat and Manby Apparatus Going off to a Stranded Vessel Making the Signal (Blue Lights) of Distress | 1831 | | 91.4 cm × 122 cm (36.0 in × 48.0 in) | Victoria & Albert Museum, London | |
| | Extensive Landscape with River or Estuary and a Distant Mountain | 1830-1840 | | 141 cm × 251.5 cm (55.5 in × 99.0 in) | Tate Britain, London | |
| | Staffa, Fingal's Cave | 1831-32 | | 90.8 cm × 121.3 cm (35.7 in × 47.8 in) | Yale Center for British Art, Connecticut | |
| | Lucy, Countess of Carlisle, and Dorothy Percy's Visit to their Father Lord Percy, when under Attainder ... | 1831 | | 40 cm × 69.2 cm (15.7 in × 27.2 in) | Tate Britain, London | |
| | Watteau Study by Fresnoy's Rules | 1831 | | 40 cm × 69.2 cm (15.7 in × 27.2 in) | Tate Britain, London | |
| | Caligula's Palace and Bridge | 1831 | | 137.2 cm × 246.4 cm (54.0 in × 97.0 in) | Tate Britain, London | |
| | Van Tromp's Barge Entering the Texel, 1645 | 1831 | | 90.2 cm × 121.9 cm (35.5 in × 48.0 in) | Sir John Soane's Museum, London | |
| | Christ Driving the Traders from the Temple | 1832 | | 92.1 cm × 70.5 cm (36.3 in × 27.8 in) | Tate Britain, London | |
| | Shrimpers: Lyme Regis | 1832 | | 21.5 cm × 29 cm (8.5 in × 11.4 in) | Nunnington Hall | |
| | The Prince of Orange, William III, Embarked from Holland, and Landed at Torbay, November 4th, 1688, after a Stormy Passage | 1832 | | 90.2 cm × 120 cm (35.5 in × 47.2 in) | Tate Britain, London | |
| | Shadrach, Meshach and Abednego in the Burning Fiery Furnace | 1832 | | 91.8 cm × 70.8 cm (36.1 in × 27.9 in) | Tate Britain, London | |
| | Childe Harold's Pilgrimage - Italy | 1832 | | 142.2 cm × 248.3 cm (56.0 in × 97.8 in) | Tate Britain, London | |
| | Van Tromp Returning after the Battle off the Dogger Bank | 1833 | | 90.5 cm × 120.6 cm (35.6 in × 47.5 in) | Tate Britain, London | |
| | Rotterdam Ferry-Boat | 1833 | | 92.3 cm × 122.5 cm (36.3 in × 48.2 in) | National Gallery of Art, Washington, D.C. | |
| | Antwerp: Van Goyen Looking Out for a Subject | 1833 | | 91.8 cm × 122.9 cm (36.1 in × 48.4 in) | Frick Collection, New York City | |
| | Quillebeuf, Mouth of the Seine | 1833 | | 88 cm × 120 cm (35 in × 47 in) | Calouste Gulbenkian Museum, Lisbon | |
| | Wreckers – Coast of Northumberland, with a Steamboat Assisting a Ship off Shore | 1833-34 | | 90.5 cm × 120.8 cm (35.6 in × 47.6 in) | Yale Center for British Art, Connecticut | |
| | Bridge of Sighs, Ducal Palace and Custom-House, Venice: Canaletti Painting | 1833 | | 51.1 cm × 81.6 cm (20.1 in × 32.1 in) | Tate Britain, London | |
| | Venice: The Dogana and San Giorgio Maggiore, 1834 | 1834 | | 91.5 cm × 122 cm (36.0 in × 48.0 in) | National Gallery of Art, Washington, D.C. | |
| | The Fountain of Indolence | 1834 | | 106.5 cm × 166.4 cm (41.9 in × 65.5 in) | Beaverbrook Art Gallery, Fredericton | |
| | The Golden Bough | 1834 | | 104.1 cm × 163.8 cm (41.0 in × 64.5 in) | Tate Britain, London | |
| | St Michael's Mount, Cornwall | 1834 | | 61 cm × 77.4 cm (24.0 in × 30.5 in) | Victoria and Albert Museum, London | |
| | The Burning of the Houses of Lords and Commons, 16th October, 1834 | 1834-1835 | | 92 cm × 123.1 cm (36.2 in × 48.5 in) | Philadelphia Museum of Art, Philadelphia | |
| | The Burning of the Houses of Lords and Commons, 16th October, 1834 | 1834-1835 | | 92 cm × 123 cm (36 in × 48 in) | Cleveland Museum of Art, Cleveland | |
| | The Long Cellar at Petworth | 1835 | | 74.9 cm × 91.4 cm (29.5 in × 36.0 in) | Tate Britain, London | |
| | The Arch of Constantine, Rome | 1835 | | 91.4 cm × 121.9 cm (36.0 in × 48.0 in) | Tate Britain, London | |
| | Rome, From Mount Aventine | 1835 | | 92 cm × 125 cm (36 in × 49 in) | Private Collection | |
| | Keelmen Heaving in Coals by Moonlight | 1835 | | 92.3 cm × 122.8 cm (36.3 in × 48.3 in) | National Gallery of Art, Washington, D.C. | |
| | Ehrenbreitstein | 1835 | | 93x123 | Private collection | |
| | A Sailing Boat off Deal | 1835 | | 22.6 cm × 30.3 cm (8.9 in × 11.9 in) | National Museum Cardiff | |
| | Line Fishing, Off Hastings | 1835 | | 58.4 cm × 76.2 cm (23.0 in × 30.0 in) | Victoria and Albert Museum, London | |
| | The Cave of Despair | 1835 | | 50.8 cm × 81.3 cm (20.0 in × 32.0 in) | Tate Britain, London | |
| | Music Party, East Cowes Castle | 1835 | | 121.3 cm × 90.5 cm (47.8 in × 35.6 in) | Tate Britain, London | |
| | Tivoli: Tobias and the Angel | 1835 | | 90.5 cm × 121 cm (35.6 in × 47.6 in) | Tate Britain, London | |
| | A Disaster at Sea | 1835 | | 171.4 cm × 220.3 cm (67.5 in × 86.7 in) | Tate Britain, London | |
| | Venice, from the Porch of Madonna della Salute | c. 1835 | | 91.4 cm × 122.2 cm (36.0 in × 48.1 in) | Metropolitan Museum of Art, New York City | |
| | Venice, the Piazzetta with the Ceremony of the Doge Marrying the Sea | 1835 | | 91.4 cm × 121.9 cm (36.0 in × 48.0 in) | Tate Britain, London | |
| | Stormy Sea with Blazing Wreck | 1835-1840 | | 99.4 cm × 141.6 cm (39.1 in × 55.7 in) | Tate Britain, London | |
| | Stormy Sea with Dolphins | 1835-1840 | | 90.2 cm × 121.3 cm (35.5 in × 47.8 in) | Tate Britain, London | |
| | Margate Harbour | 1835-1845 | | 45.9 cm × 61.1 cm (18.1 in × 24.1 in) | Sudley House, Liverpool | |
| | The Morning after the Wreck | 1835-1845 | | 38.7 cm × 61.8 cm (15.2 in × 24.3 in) | National Museum Cardiff | |
| | Breakers on a Flat Beach | 1835–1840 | | 90.2 cm × 121 cm (35.5 in × 47.6 in) | Tate Britain, London | |
| | Seascape | 1835–1840 | | 90.2 cm × 121 cm (35.5 in × 47.6 in) | Tate Britain, London | |
| | The Beacon Light | 1835-1845 | | 61.5 cm × 96 cm (24.2 in × 37.8 in) | National Museum Cardiff | |
| | Head of a Person Asleep | 1835 | | 24.4 cm × 30.2 cm (9.6 in × 11.9 in) | Tate Britain, London | |

=== 1836–1851 Modernism ===
Table featuring paintings by J. M. W. Turner
| Image | Title | Year | Medium | Dimensions | Collection | Ref. |
|---|---|---|---|---|---|---|
| | Margate (?), from the Sea | 1835-1840 | | 91.2 cm × 122.2 cm (35.9 in × 48.1 in) | National Gallery, London | |
| | Juliet and Her Nurse | 1836 | | 88 cm × 121 cm (35 in × 48 in) | AMALITA Collection, Buenos Aires | |
| | Mercury and Argus | 1836 | | 151.8 cm × 111.8 cm (59.8 in × 44.0 in) | National Gallery of Canada, Ottawa | |
| | Valley of Aosta: Snowstorm, Avalanche, and Thunderstorm | 1836-37 | | 92.2 cm × 123 cm (36.3 in × 48.4 in) | Art Institute of Chicago, Chicago | |
| | The Parting of Hero and Leander | 1837 | | 146 cm × 236 cm (57 in × 93 in) | National Gallery, London | |
| | The Death of Actaeon, with a Distant View of Montjovet, Val d'Aosta | 1837 | | 149.2 cm × 111.1 cm (58.7 in × 43.7 in) | Tate Britain, London | |
| | Story of Apollo and Daphne | 1837 | | 109.9 cm × 198.8 cm (43.3 in × 78.3 in) | Tate Britain, London | |
| | The Grand Canal: Scene - a Street in Venice | c. 1837 | | 150.5 cm × 112.4 cm (59.3 in × 44.3 in) | Huntington Library, San Marino, California | |
| | Fishing Boats with Hucksters Bargaining for Fish | 1837-38 | | 174.5 cm × 224.9 cm (68.7 in × 88.5 in) | Art Institute of Chicago, Chicago | |
| | Ancient Italy – Ovid Banished from Rome | 1838 | | 94.6 cm × 125 | Private collection | |
| | Modern Italy: The Pifferari | 1838 | | 92.6 cm × 123.2 cm (36.5 in × 48.5 in) | Kelvingrove Art Gallery and Museum, Glasgow | |
| | Phryne Going to the Public Baths as Venus: Demosthenes Taunted by Aeschines | 1838 | | 193 cm × 165.1 cm (76.0 in × 65.0 in) | Tate Britain, London | |
| | The Fighting Temeraire | 1839 | | 90.7 cm × 121.6 cm (35.7 in × 47.9 in) | National Gallery, London | |
| | Ancient Rome – Agrippina Landing with the Ashes of Germanicus | 1839 | | 91.4 cm × 121.9 cm (36.0 in × 48.0 in) | Tate Britain, London | |
| | Modern Rome – Campo Vaccino | 1839 | | 90.2 cm × 122 cm (35.5 in × 48.0 in) | J. Paul Getty Museum, Los Angeles | |
| | Cicero at His Villa at Tusculum | 1839 | | 92.5 cm × 123.5 cm (36.4 in × 48.6 in) | Private collection | |
| | The Rape of Proserpine | 1839 | | 92.6 cm × 123.7 cm (36.5 in × 48.7 in) | National Gallery of Art, Washington | |
| | Oberwesel | 1840 | | 35 cm × 53.1 cm (13.8 in × 20.9 in) | National Gallery of Art, Washington | |
| | Margate Jetty | 1840 | | 47 cm × 37 cm (19 in × 15 in) | National Museum Cardiff | |
| | Waves Breaking against the Wind | 1840 | | 60.4 cm × 95 cm (23.8 in × 37.4 in) | Tate Britain, London | |
| | The Slave Ship | 1840 | | 91 cm × 123 cm (36 in × 48 in) | Museum of Fine Arts, Boston | |
| | Seascape with Distant Coast | 1840 | | 91.4 cm × 121.9 cm (36.0 in × 48.0 in) | Tate Britain, London | |
| | Seascape with Buoy | 1840 | | 91.4 cm × 121.9 cm (36.0 in × 48.0 in) | Tate Britain, London | |
| | Bacchus and Ariadne | 1840 | | 78.7 cm × 78.7 cm (31.0 in × 31.0 in) | Tate Britain, London | |
| | The New Moon; or, 'I've lost My Boat, You shan't have Your Hoop' | 1840 | | 5.4 cm × 81.3 cm (2.1 in × 32.0 in) | Tate Britain, London | |
| | Neapolitan Fisher Girls Surprised Bathing by Moonlight | c. 1840 | | 65.7 cm × 81 cm (25.9 in × 31.9 in) | Huntington Library, San Marino, California | |
| | Venice from the Canale della Giudecca with the Church of Santa Maria della Salute | c. 1840 | | 61 cm × 91.4 cm (24.0 in × 36.0 in) | Private Collection | |
| | Venice from the Giudecca | 1840 | | 61 cm × 91.4 cm (24.0 in × 36.0 in) | Victoria and Albert Museum, London | |
| | Venice, the Bridge of Sighs | 1840 | | | Tate Britain, London | |
| | Seascape with Storm Coming On | 1840 | | | Tate Britain, London | |
| | Sun Setting over a Lake | 1840 | | | Tate Britain, London | |
| | Glaucus and Scylla | 1841 | | 77 cm × 78 cm (30 in × 31 in) | Kimbell Art Museum | |
| | Giudecca, La Donna della Salute and San Giorgio | 1841 | | 61 cm × 91.5 cm (24.0 in × 36.0 in) | Private Collection | |
| | Schloss Rosenau | 1841 | | | Sudley House, Liverpool | |
| | Dawn of Christianity (Flight into Egypt) | 1841 | | 79 cm × 79 cm (31 in × 31 in) | Ulster Museum, Belfast | |
| | The Ducal Palace, Dogana and Part of San Giorgio | 1841 | | 63.5 cm × 93 cm (25.0 in × 36.6 in) | Allen Memorial Art Museum, Ohio | |
| | Peace - Burial at Sea | 1842 | | 87 cm × 86.7 cm (34.3 in × 34.1 in) | Tate Britain, London | |
| | The Dogano, San Giorgio, Citella, from the Steps of the Europa | 1842 | | 61.6 cm × 92.7 cm (24.3 in × 36.5 in) | Tate Britain, London | |
| | War. The Exile and the Rock Limpet | 1842 | | 79.4 cm × 79.4 cm (31.3 in × 31.3 in) | Tate Britain, London | |
| | Snow Storm: Steam-Boat off a Harbour's Mouth | 1842 | | 91.4 cm × 121.9 cm (36.0 in × 48.0 in) | Tate Britain, London | |
| | Campo Santo, Venice | 1842 | | 62.2 cm × 92.7 cm (24.5 in × 36.5 in) | Toledo Museum of Art, Ohio | |
| | The Opening of the Wallhalla | 1843 | | 112.7 cm × 200.7 cm (44.4 in × 79.0 in) | Tate Britain, London | |
| | Shade and Darkness - the Evening of the Deluge | 1843 | | 78.7 cm × 78.1 cm (31.0 in × 30.7 in) | Tate Britain, London | |
| | St Benedetto, Looking Towards Fusina | 1843 | | 62.2 cm × 92.7 cm (24.5 in × 36.5 in) | Tate Britain, London | |
| | The Sun of Venice Going to Sea | 1843 | | 61.6 cm × 92.1 cm (24.3 in × 36.3 in) | Tate Britain, London | |
| | Light and Colour (Goethe's Theory) – The Morning after the Deluge – Moses Writing the Book of Genesis | 1843 | | 78.7 × W 78.7 | Tate Britain, London | |
| | The Evening of the Deluge | c. 1843 | | 76 cm × 76 cm (30 in × 30 in) | National Gallery of Art, Washington, D.C. | |
| | Lake Lucerne: the Bay of Uri from above Brunnen | 1844 | | 72.7 cm × 98.3 cm (28.6 in × 38.7 in) | Tate Britain, London | |
| | Ostend | 1844 | | 91.6 cm × 122 cm (36.1 in × 48.0 in) | Neue Pinakothek, Munich | |
| | Van Tromp, Going About to Please His Masters | 1844 | | 91.4 cm × 121.9 cm (36.0 in × 48.0 in) | Getty Museum, Los Angeles | |
| | Heidelberg | 1844-5 | | 132.1 cm × 201.9 cm (52.0 in × 79.5 in) | Tate Britain, London | |
| | Sunset From the Top of the Rigi | 1844 | | 71.1 cm × 96.5 cm (28.0 in × 38.0 in) | Tate Britain, London | |
| | Off the Nore | 1840-1845 | | 30.5 cm × 45.7 cm (12.0 in × 18.0 in) | Yale Center for British Art, Connecticut | |
| | A River Seen from a Hill | 1840-1845 | | 78.7 cm × 79.4 cm (31.0 in × 31.3 in) | Tate Britain, London | |
| | Landscape with Water | 1840-1845 | | 121.9 cm × 182.2 cm (48.0 in × 71.7 in) | Tate Britain, London | |
| | The Arrival of Louis-Philippe at Portsmouth | 1844-45 | | 90.8 cm × 121.3 cm (35.7 in × 47.8 in) | Tate Britain, London | |
| | The Disembarkation of Louis-Philippe at Portsmouth, 8 October 1844 | 1844-45 | | 90.2 cm × 120.6 cm (35.5 in × 47.5 in) | Tate Britain, London | |
| | Rough Sea with Wreckage | 1840-1845 | | 92.1 cm × 122.6 cm (36.3 in × 48.3 in) | Tate Britain, London | |
| | Yacht Approaching the Coast | 1840-1845 | | 102.2 cm × 142.2 cm (40.2 in × 56.0 in) | Tate Britain, London | |
| | Venetian Scene | 1840-1845 | | 79.4 cm × 78.7 cm (31.3 in × 31.0 in) | Tate Britain, London | |
| | Sunrise, with a Boat between Headlands | 1840-1845 | | 91.4 cm × 121.9 cm (36.0 in × 48.0 in) | Tate Britain, London | |
| | Landscape | 1840-1845 | | 92 cm × 122 cm (36 in × 48 in) | Walker Art Gallery, Liverpool | |
| | The Ponte Delle Torri, Spoleto | 1840-1845 | | 91.4 cm × 121.9 cm (36.0 in × 48.0 in) | Tate Britain, London | |
| | Venice with the Salute | 1840-1845 | | 62.2 cm × 92.7 cm (24.5 in × 36.5 in) | Tate Britain, London | |
| | A Wreck, with Fishing Boats | 1840-1845 | | 91.4 cm × 122.2 cm (36.0 in × 48.1 in) | Tate Britain, London | |
| | Sunrise, a Castle on a Bay: 'Solitude' | 1840-1845 | | 90.8 cm × 121.9 cm (35.7 in × 48.0 in) | Tate Britain, London | |
| | The Storm | 1840-1845 | | 54.6 cm × 77 cm (21.5 in × 30.3 in) | National Museum Cardiff | |
| | The Morning after the Storm | 1840-1845 | | 32.6 cm × 54.4 cm (12.8 in × 21.4 in) | National Museum Cardiff | |
| | Scene in Venice | 1840-1845 | | 62.2 cm × 92.7 cm (24.5 in × 36.5 in) | Tate Britain, London | |
| | Rough Sea | 1840-1845 | | 91.4 cm × 121.9 cm (36.0 in × 48.0 in) | Tate Britain, London | |
| | Stormy Sea Breaking on a Shore | 1840-1845 | | 44.5 cm × 63.5 cm (17.5 in × 25.0 in) | Yale Center for British Art, Connecticut | |
| | Venice Quay, Ducal Palace | 1844 | | 62.2 cm × 92.7 cm (24.5 in × 36.5 in) | Tate Britain, London | |
| | Approach to Venice | 1844 | | 62 cm × 94 cm (24 in × 37 in) | National Gallery of Art, Washington, D.C. | |
| | Rain, Steam and Speed – The Great Western Railway | 1844 | | 91 cm × 121.8 cm (35.8 in × 48.0 in) | National Gallery, London | |
| | Venice, Maria della Salute | 1844 | | 61.3 cm × 92.1 cm (24.1 in × 36.3 in) | Tate Britain, London | |
| | Fishing Boats Bringing a Disabled Ship into Port Ruysdael | 1844 | | 91.4 cm × 123.2 cm (36.0 in × 48.5 in) | Tate Britain, London | |
| | Whalers | 1845 | | 91.1 cm × 121.9 cm (35.9 in × 48.0 in) | Tate Britain, London | |
| | Venice - Sunset, a Fisher | 1845 | | 61.3 cm × 92.1 cm (24.1 in × 36.3 in) | Tate Britain, London | |
| | Venice - Noon | 1845 | | 61.0 cm × 91.8 cm (24.0 in × 36.1 in) | Tate Britain, London | |
| | Venetian Festival | 1845 | | 72.4 cm × 113.3 cm (28.5 in × 44.6 in) | Tate Britain, London | |
| | Inverary Pier, Loch Fyne: Morning | 1845 | | 91.4 cm × 121.9 cm (36.0 in × 48.0 in) | Yale Center for British Art, Connecticut | |
| | The Falls of the Clyde | 1845 | | 89 cm × 119.5 cm (35.0 in × 47.0 in) | Lady Lever Art Gallery, Wirral | |
| | Falls of Schaffhausen (Val d’Aosta) | 1845 | | 91.5 cm × 122.0 cm (36.0 in × 48.0 in) | National Gallery of Victoria, Melbourne | |
| | Sunrise with Sea Monsters | 1845 | | 91.4 cm × 121.9 cm (36.0 in × 48.0 in) | Tate Britain, London | |
| | Riva degli Schiavone, Venice: Water Fête | 1845 | | 72.4 cm × 113 cm (28.5 in × 44.5 in) | Tate Britain, London | |
| | Norham Castle, Sunrise | 1845 | | 90.8 cm × 121.9 cm (35.7 in × 48.0 in) | Tate Britain, London | |
| | Whalers | c. 1845 | | 91.8 cm × 122.6 cm (36.1 in × 48.3 in) | Metropolitan Museum of Art, New York City | |
| | Seascape: Folkestone | c. 1845 | | 86 cm × 120 cm (34 in × 47 in) | Private collection | |
| | Hurrah! for the Whaler Erebus! Another Fish! | 1846 | | 90.2 cm × 120.6 cm (35.5 in × 47.5 in) | Tate Britain, London | |
| | Going to the Ball (San Martino) | 1846 | | 61.6 cm × 92.4 cm (24.3 in × 36.4 in) | Tate Britain, London | |
| | Queen Mab's Cave | 1846 | | 92.1 cm × 122.6 cm (36.3 in × 48.3 in) | Tate Britain, London | |
| | The Angel Standing in the Sun | 1846 | | 78.7 cm × 78.7 cm (31.0 in × 31.0 in) | Tate Britain, London | |
| | Undine Giving the Ring to Massaniello, Fisherman of Naples | 1846 | | 79.1 cm × 79.1 cm (31.1 in × 31.1 in) | Tate Britain, London | |
| | Returning from the Ball (St Martha) | 1846 | | 61.6 cm × 92.4 cm (24.3 in × 36.4 in) | Tate Britain, London | |
| | Whalers (Boiling Blubber) Entangled in Flaw Ice, Endeavouring to Extricate Themselves | 1846 | | 89.9 cm × 120 cm (35.4 in × 47.2 in) | Tate Britain, London | |
| | The Hero of a Hundred Fights | 1847 | | 90.8 cm × 121.3 cm (35.7 in × 47.8 in) | Tate Britain, London | |
| | The Wreck Buoy | 1849 | | 92.7 cm × 123.2 cm (36.5 in × 48.5 in) | Sudley House, Liverpool | |
| | Mercury Sent to Admonish Aeneas | 1850 | | 90.2 cm × 120.6 cm (35.5 in × 47.5 in) | Tate Britain, London | |
| | The Visit to the Tomb | 1850 | | 91.4 cm × 121.9 cm (36.0 in × 48.0 in) | Tate Britain, London | |
| | The Departure of the Fleet | 1850 | | 89.9 cm × 120.3 cm (35.4 in × 47.4 in) | Tate Britain, London | |

=== Undated ===
Table featuring paintings by J. M. W. Turner
| Image | Title | Year | Medium | Dimensions | Collection | Ref. |
|---|---|---|---|---|---|---|
| | Fishermen at Sea | Exhibited 1796 | Oil on canvas | 91.4 cm × 122.2 cm (36.0 in × 48.1 in) | Tate Britain, London | |
| | Moonlight, a Study at Millbank | Exhibited 1797 | Oil on mahogany | 31.4 cm × 40.3 cm (12.4 in × 15.9 in) | Tate Britain, London | |
| | Buttermere Lake, with Part of Cromackwater, Cumberland, a Shower | Exhibited 1798 | Oil on canvas | 88.9 cm × 119.4 cm (35.0 in × 47.0 in) | Tate Britain, London | |
| | Morning amongst the Coniston Fells, Cumberland | Exhibited 1798 | Oil on canvas | 122.9 cm × 89.9 cm (48.4 in × 35.4 in) | Tate Britain, London | |

== Studies ==
Table featuring paintings by J. M. W. Turner
| Image | Title | Year | Medium | Dimensions | Collection | Ref. |
|---|---|---|---|---|---|---|
| | Study for Dolbadarn Castle | 1799–1800 | Oil on panel | 45.5 cm × 30.0 cm (17.9 in × 11.8 in) | National Library of Wales, Aberystwyth | |
| | Study for Dido Directing the Equipment of the Fleet (Note: Also called Claudian Harbour Scene) | c. 1827–1828 | Oil on canvas | 60.0 cm × 93.7 cm (23.6 in × 36.9 in) | Tate Britain, London | |
| | Study for The Fighting Temeraire (Note: Also called Steamer and Lightship) | c. 1838–1839 | Oil on canvas | 91.4 cm × 119.7 cm (36.0 in × 47.1 in) | Tate Britain, London | |
| | Study for Rockets and Blue Lights (Note: Also called Waves Breaking on a Lee Shore at Margate) | c. 1840 | Oil on canvas | 59.7 cm × 95.2 cm (23.5 in × 37.5 in) | Tate Britain, London | |

== See also ==
List of paintings by John Constable
