= Interior of a Romanesque Church (J. M. W. Turner) =

Painting by J. M. W. Turner

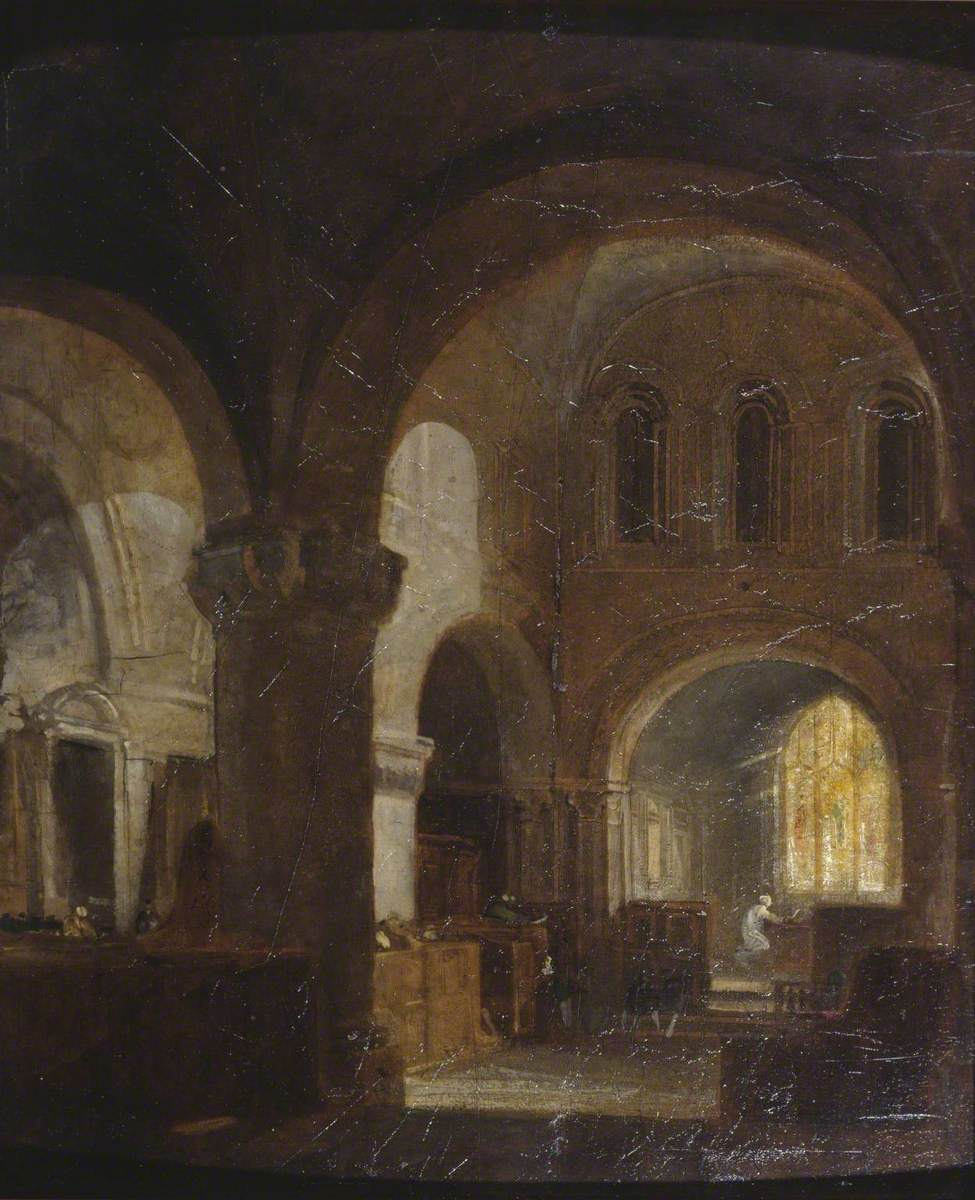
- Artist: J. M. W. Turner
- Year: c. 1795–1800
- Medium: oil on board
- Dimensions: 50.2 cm × 61 cm (19.8 in × 24 in)
- Location: Tate Gallery, London
- Website: www.tate.org.uk/...n05529

Interior of a Romanesque Church is an oil on mahogany painting by J. M. W. Turner, painted c. 1795–1800. It depicts the interior of a medieval church in the romanesque style. It is held at the Tate Gallery, in London.

== See also ==
- List of paintings by J. M. W. Turner
