= Royal Academy Exhibition of 1818 =

1818 art exhibition in London

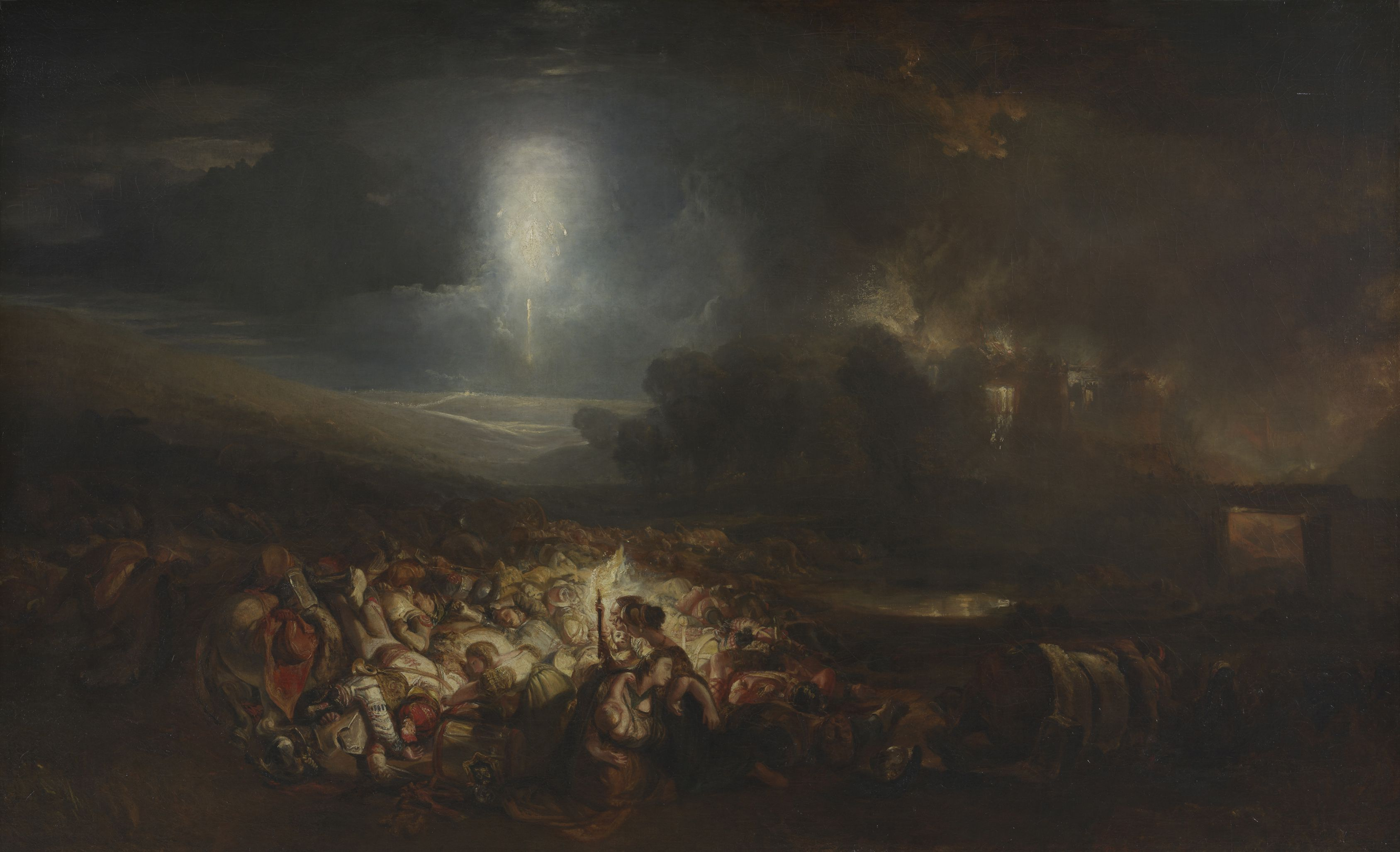
The Field of Waterloo by J.M.W. Turner

The Royal Academy Exhibition of 1818 was an art exhibition held at Somerset House in London between 4 May and 27 June 1818. It was the fiftieth annual Summer Exhibition staged by the Royal Academy of Arts and attracted nearly eighty thousand visitors. It featured submissions from most of the leading British-based painters, sculptors and architects of the Regency era.

J.M.W. Turner displayed The Field of Waterloo, a scene of the aftermath of the 1815 Battle of Waterloo. As night has fallen the battlefield is covered with corpses with the farmhouse of Hougoumont still blazing in the background. He exhibited it with lines from Lord Byron's poem Childe Harold's Pilgrimage. Another work by Turner receiving critical attention ws his seascape Dort or Dordrecht. This has been interpreted as a riposte to the success of his friend and rival Augustus Wall Callcott's The Entrance to the Pool of London at the Academy Exhibition of 1816. In 1818 Callcott exhibited Mouth of the Tyne, which also received praise.

The leading portraitist of the era Thomas Lawrence featured pictures of prominent figures including the Prince Regent and the Duke of Wellington with his horse Copenhagen. This was the largest of seven portraits of the Duke painted by Lawrence. George Dawe attracted notice for his Portrait of Princess Charlotte, who had died in childbirth the previous year leaving the country without a guaranteed heir. Dawe also displayed a painting of her husband Prince Leopold.

The American-born President of the Royal Academy Benjamin West submitted one of his last major works the history painting The Treaty of Allahabad. His fellow American Washington Allston showed Hermia and Helena based on a scene from William Shakespeare's A Midsummer Night's Dream. David Wilkie displayed the genre painting The Errand Boy and The Abbotsford Family, a group portrait of the writer Sir Walter Scott and his relations at Abbotsford.

== Gallery ==
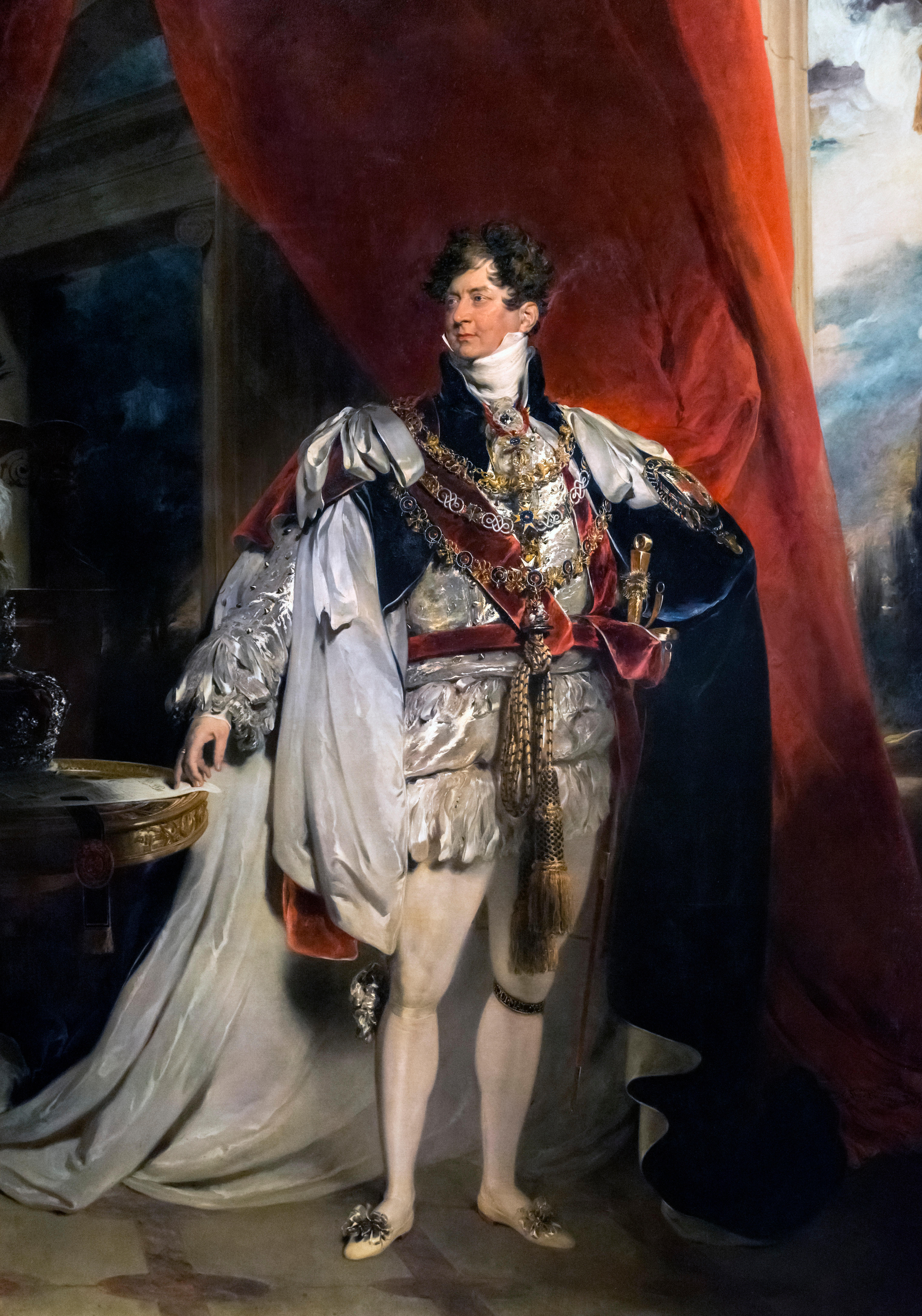
Portrait of the Prince Regent by Thomas Lawrence

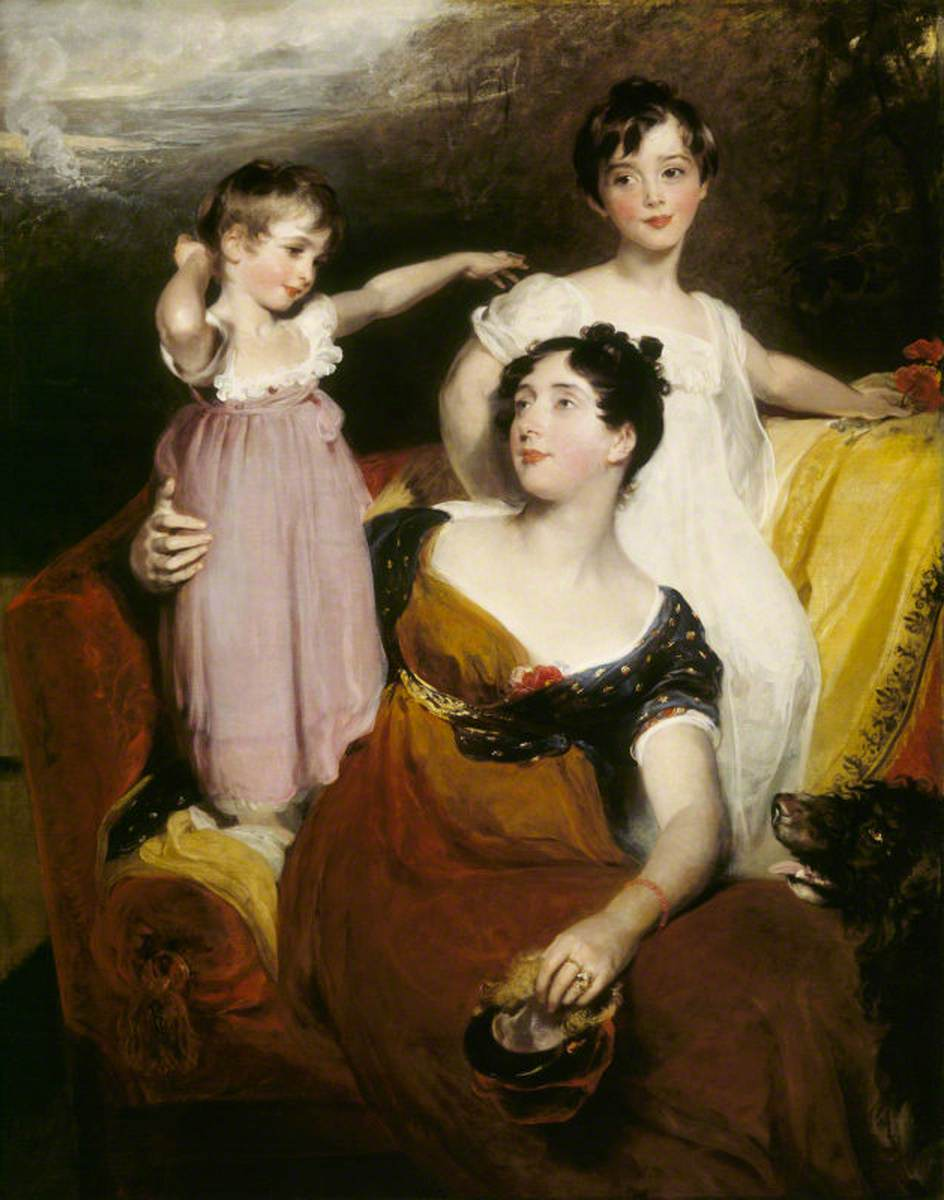
Lady Ackland and Her Sons by Thomas Lawrence

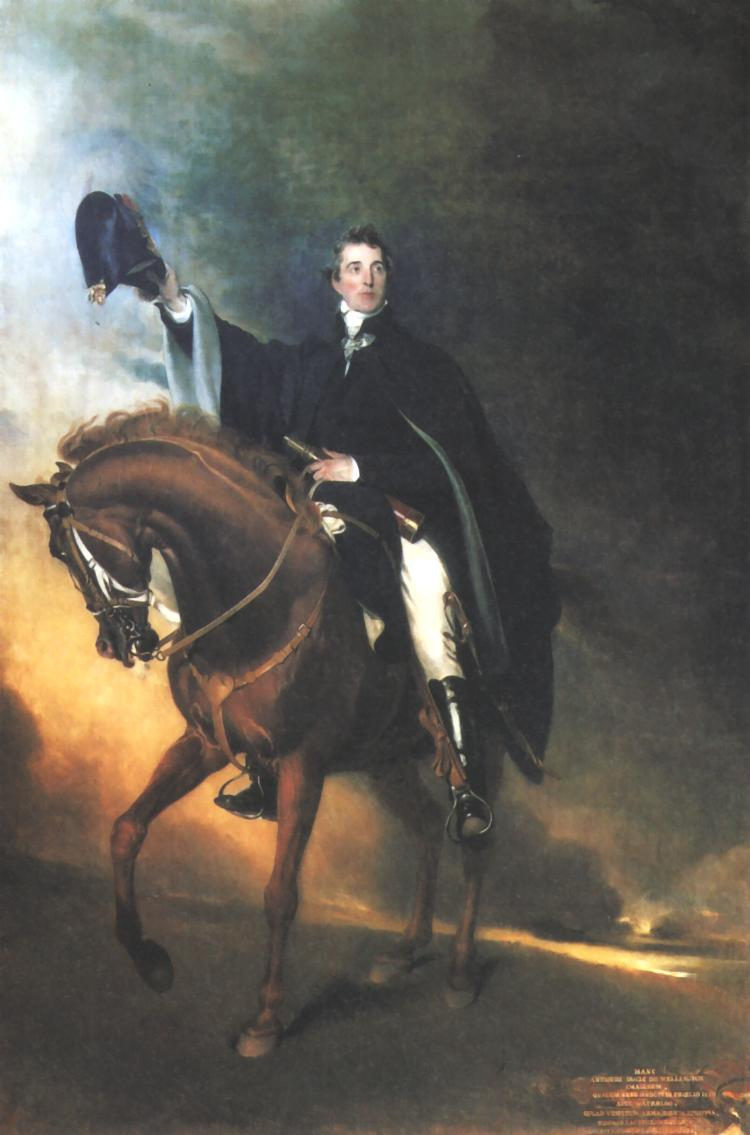
The Duke of Wellington on Copenhagen by Thomas Lawrence

Portrait of Frederick Stewart by Thomas Lawrence

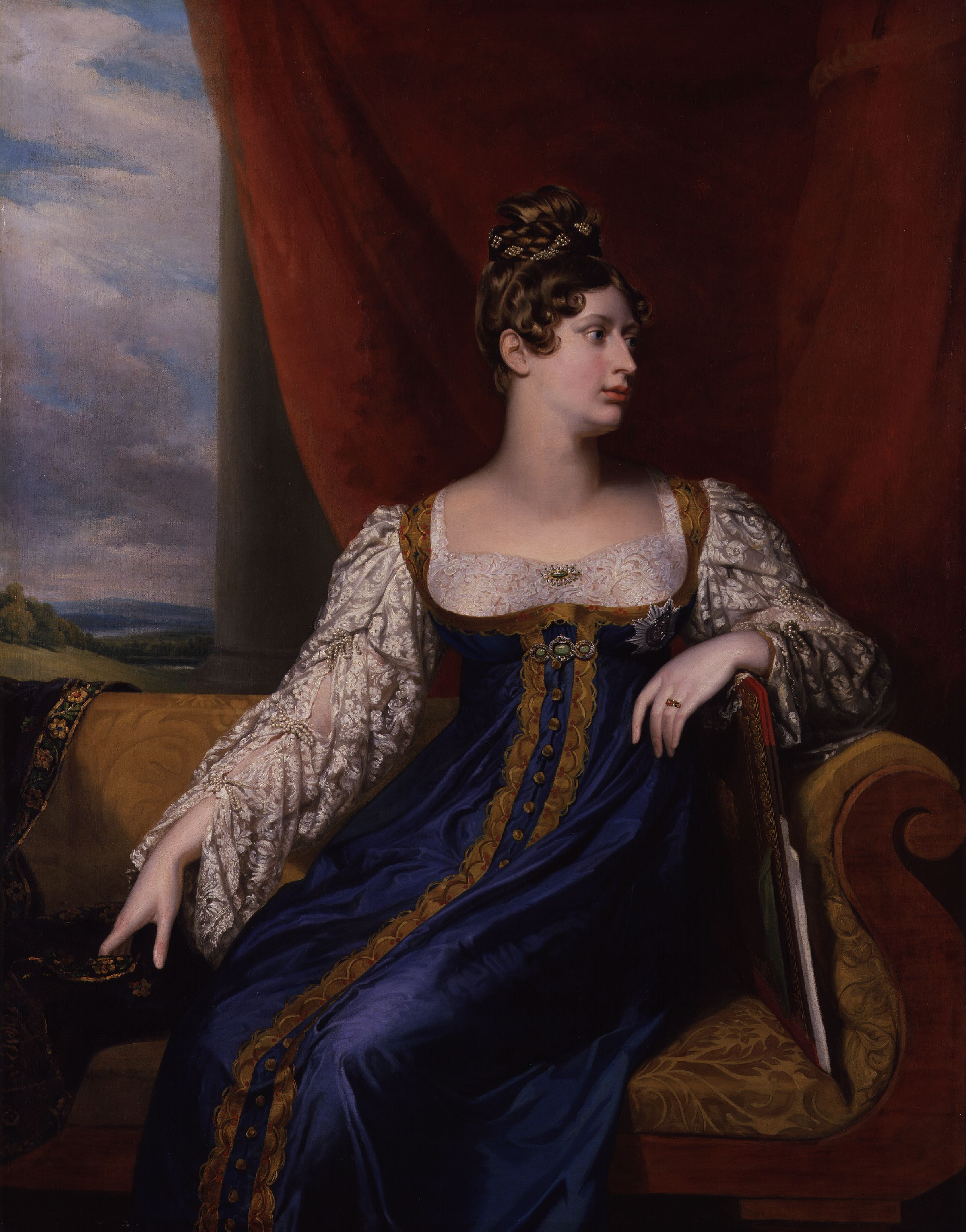
Portrait of Princess Charlotte Augusta of Wales by George Dawe

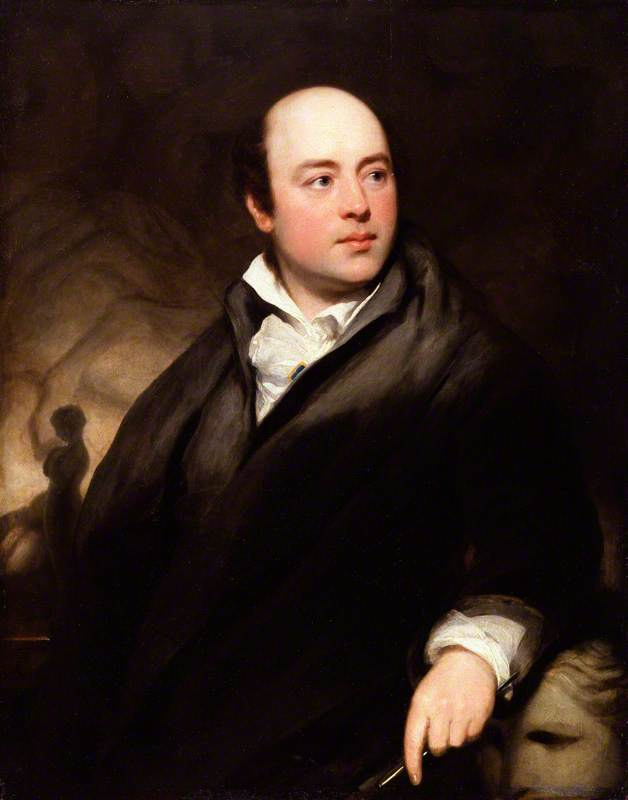
Portrait of Francis Leggatt Chantrey by Thomas Phillips

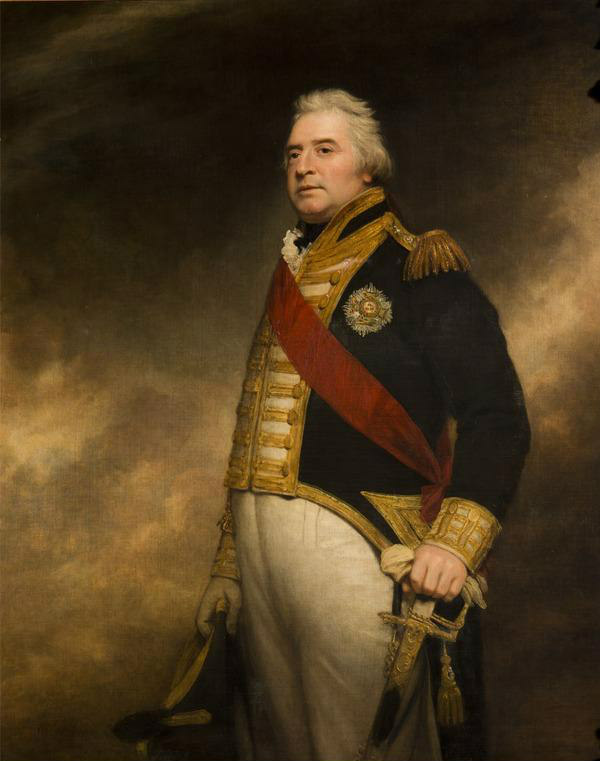
Portrait of George Campbell by William Beechey

Portrait of Earl Grosvenor by John Jackson

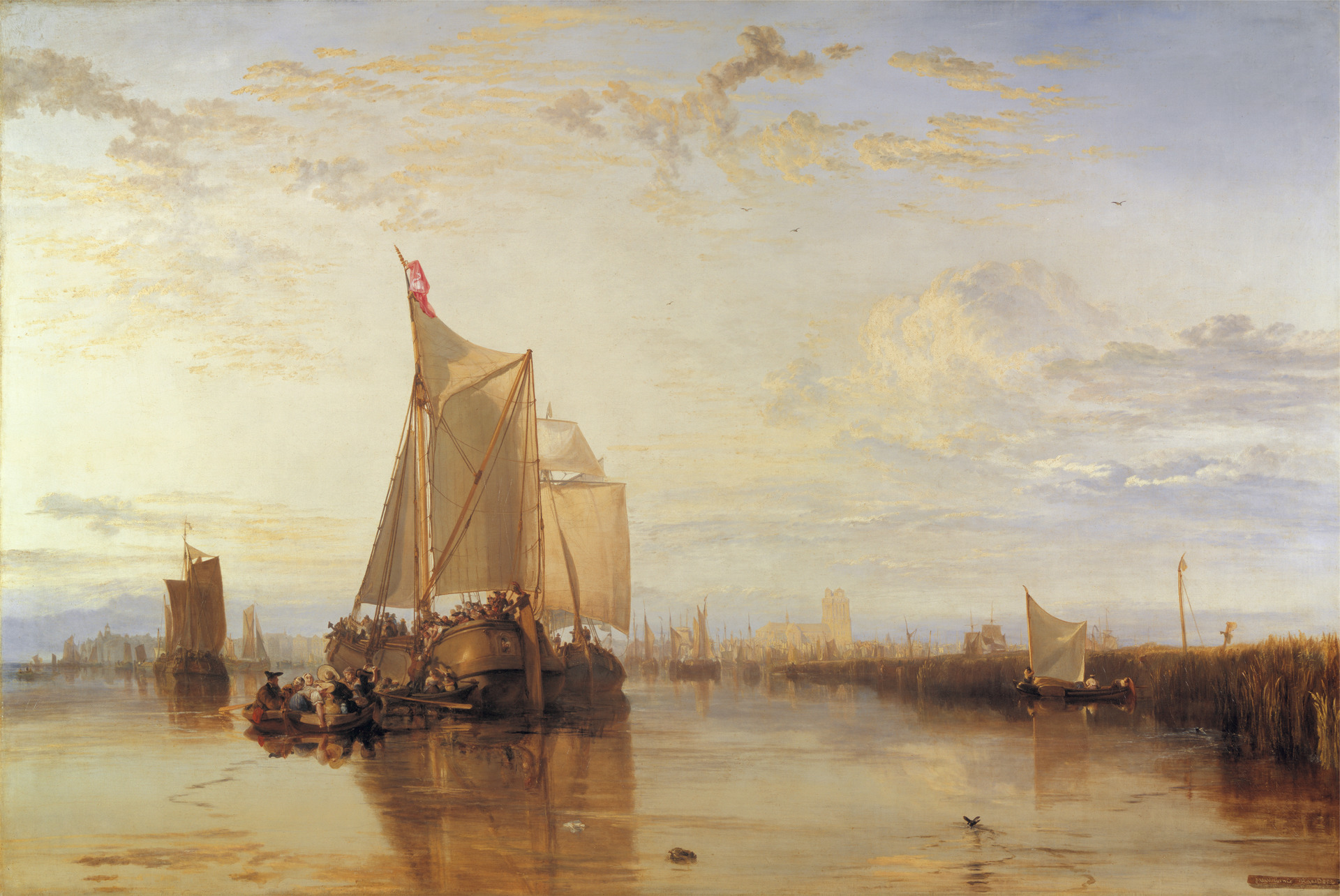
Dort or Dordrecht by J.M.W. Turner

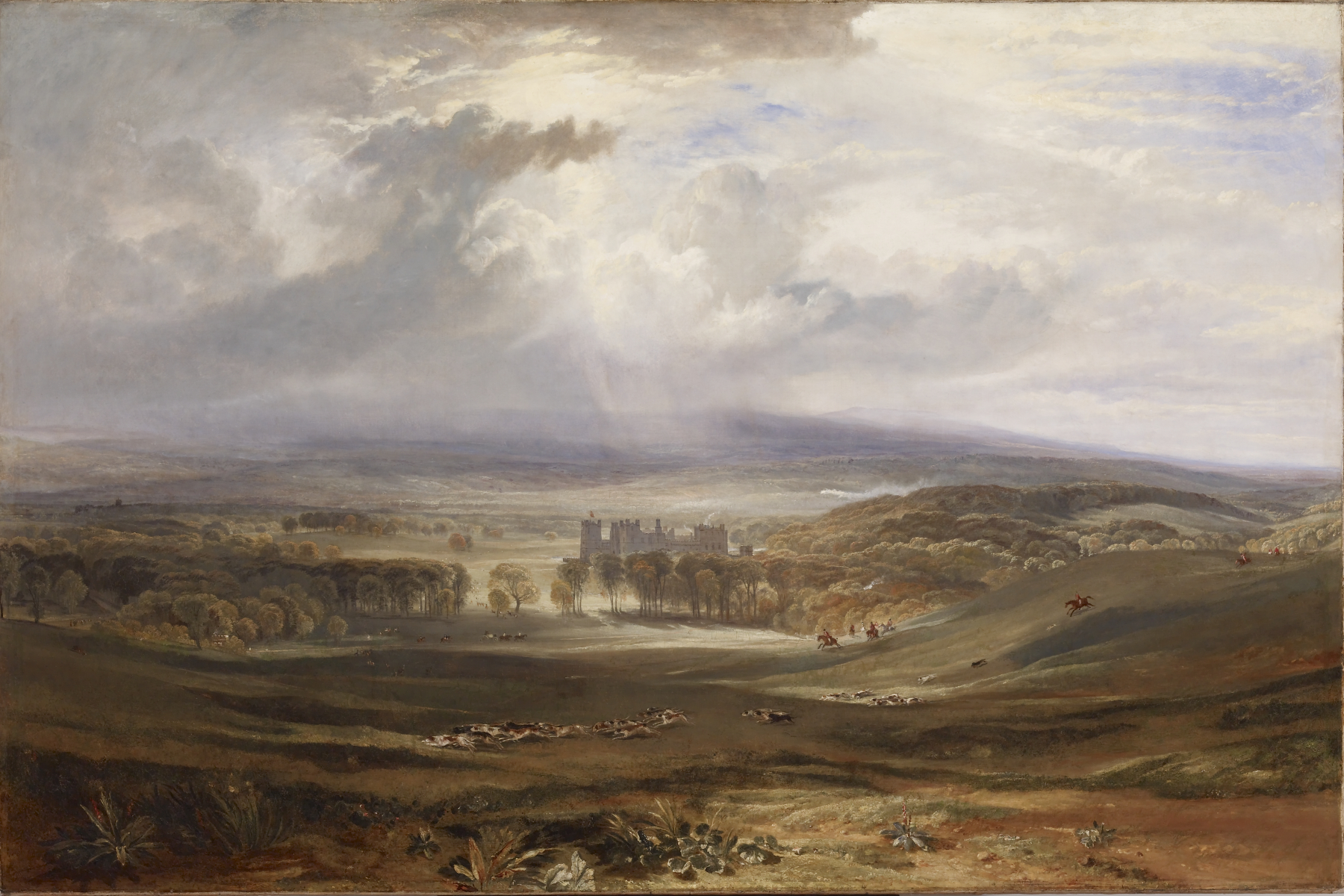
Raby Castle by J.M.W. Turner

The Errand Boy by David Wilkie

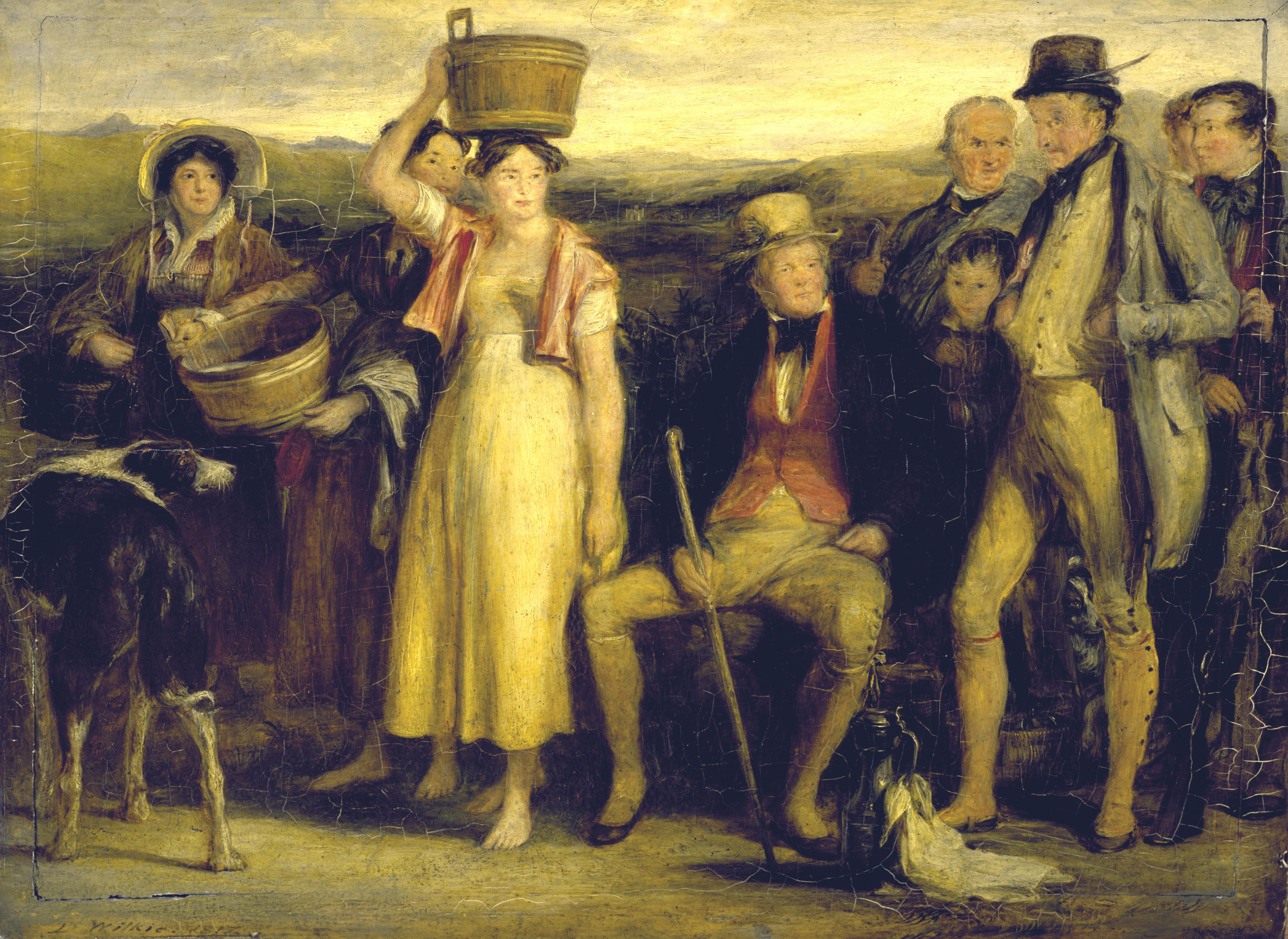
The Abbotsford Family by David Wilkie

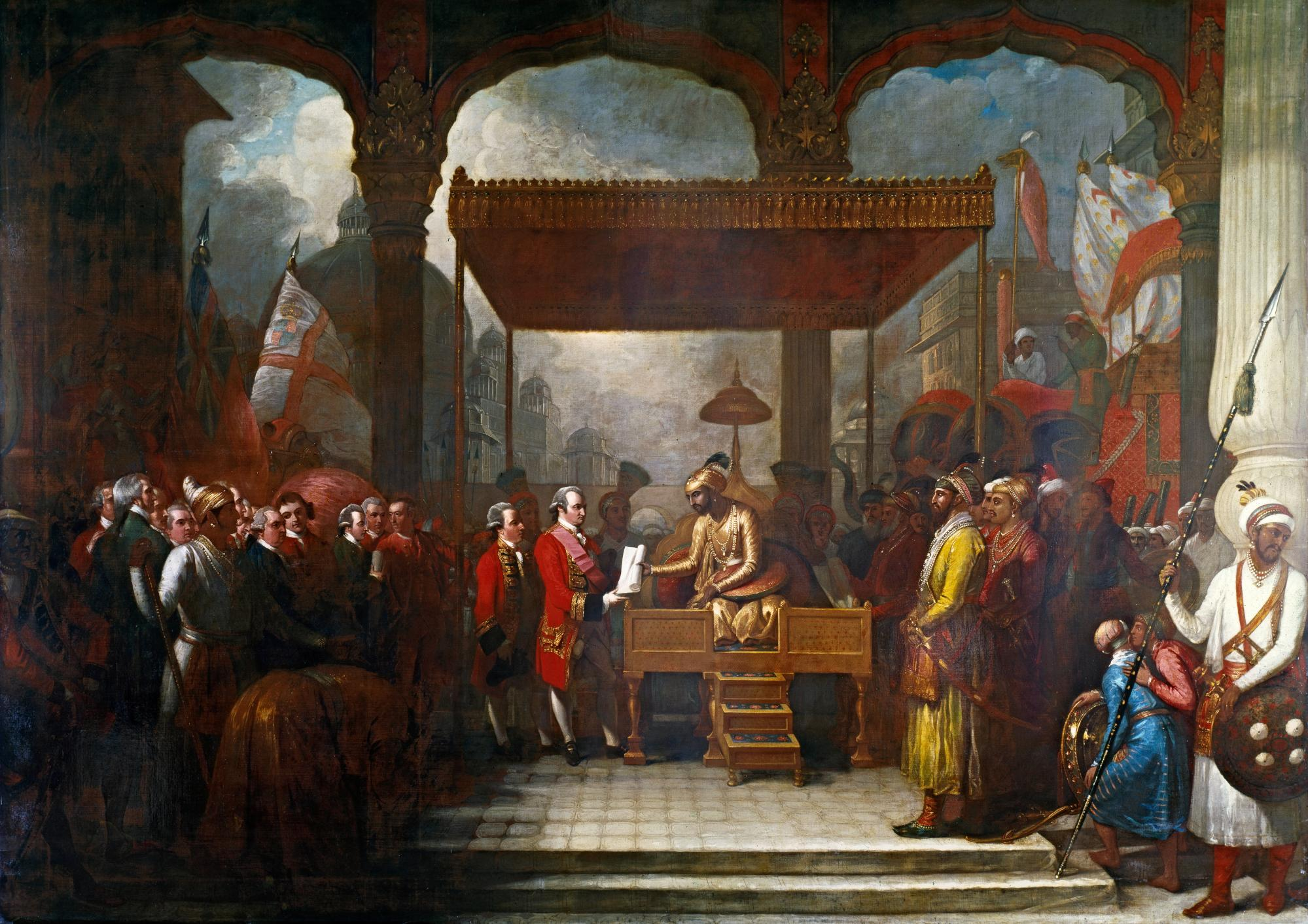
The Treaty of Allahabad by Benjamin West

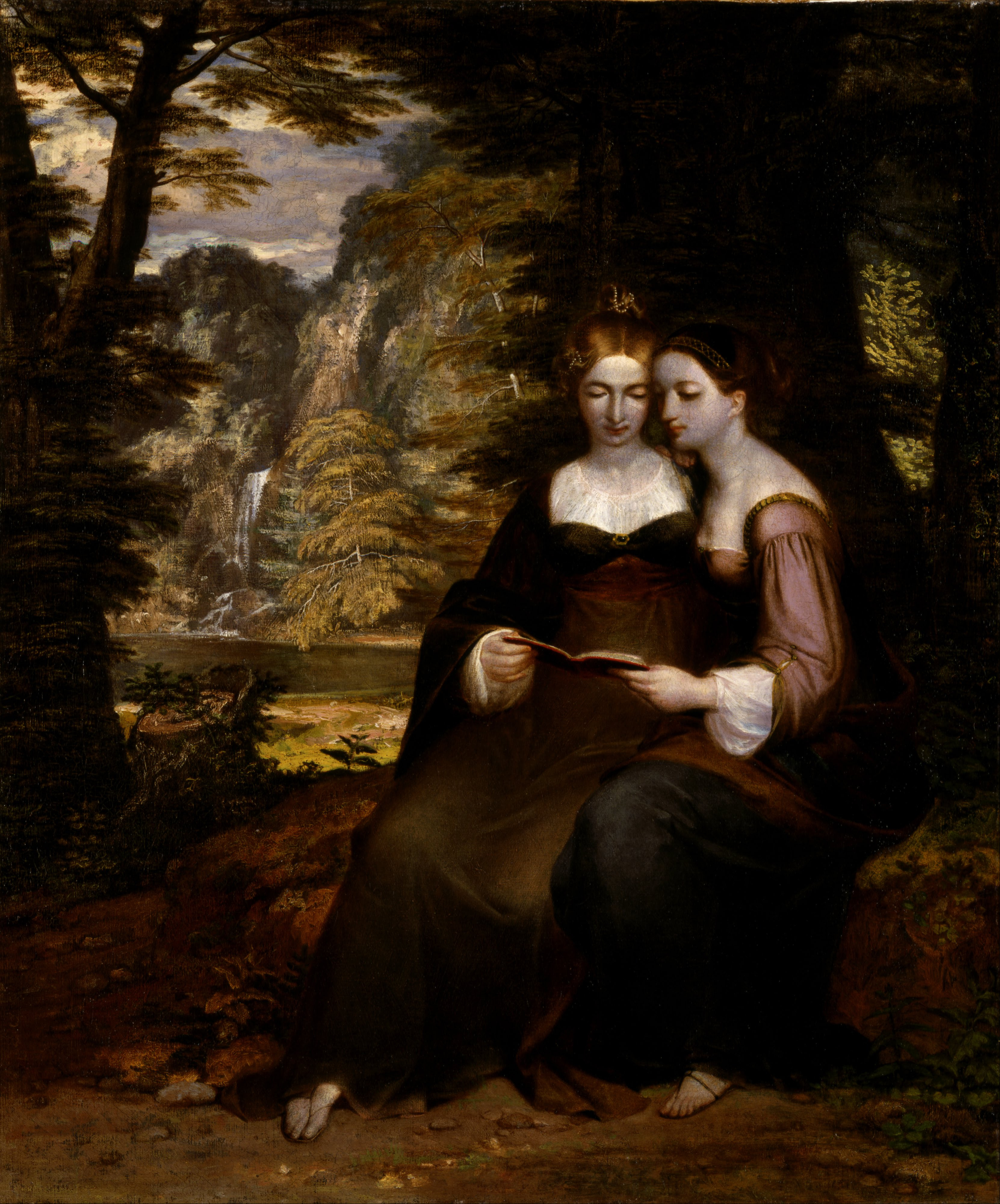
Hermia and Helena by Washington Allston

== Bibliography ==
- Bailey, Anthony. J.M.W. Turner: Standing in the Sun. Tate Enterprises Ltd, 2013.
- Hamilton, James. Turner - A Life. Sceptre, 1998.
- Levey, Michael. Sir Thomas Lawrence. Yale University Press, 2005.
- Reynolds, Luke. Who Owned Waterloo?: Battle, Memory, and Myth in British History, 1815–1852. Oxford University Press, 2022.
- Tromans, Nicholas. David Wilkie: The People's Painter. Edinburgh University Press, 2007.
- Ward, Meredith. Adventure and Inspiration: American Artists in Other Lands. Hirschl and Adler Galleries, 1988.
