= Dort or Dordrecht: The Dort Packet-boat from Rotterdam Becalmed =

Painting by J. M. W. Turner

Dort or Dordrecht: The Dort Packet-Boat from Rotterdam Becalmed
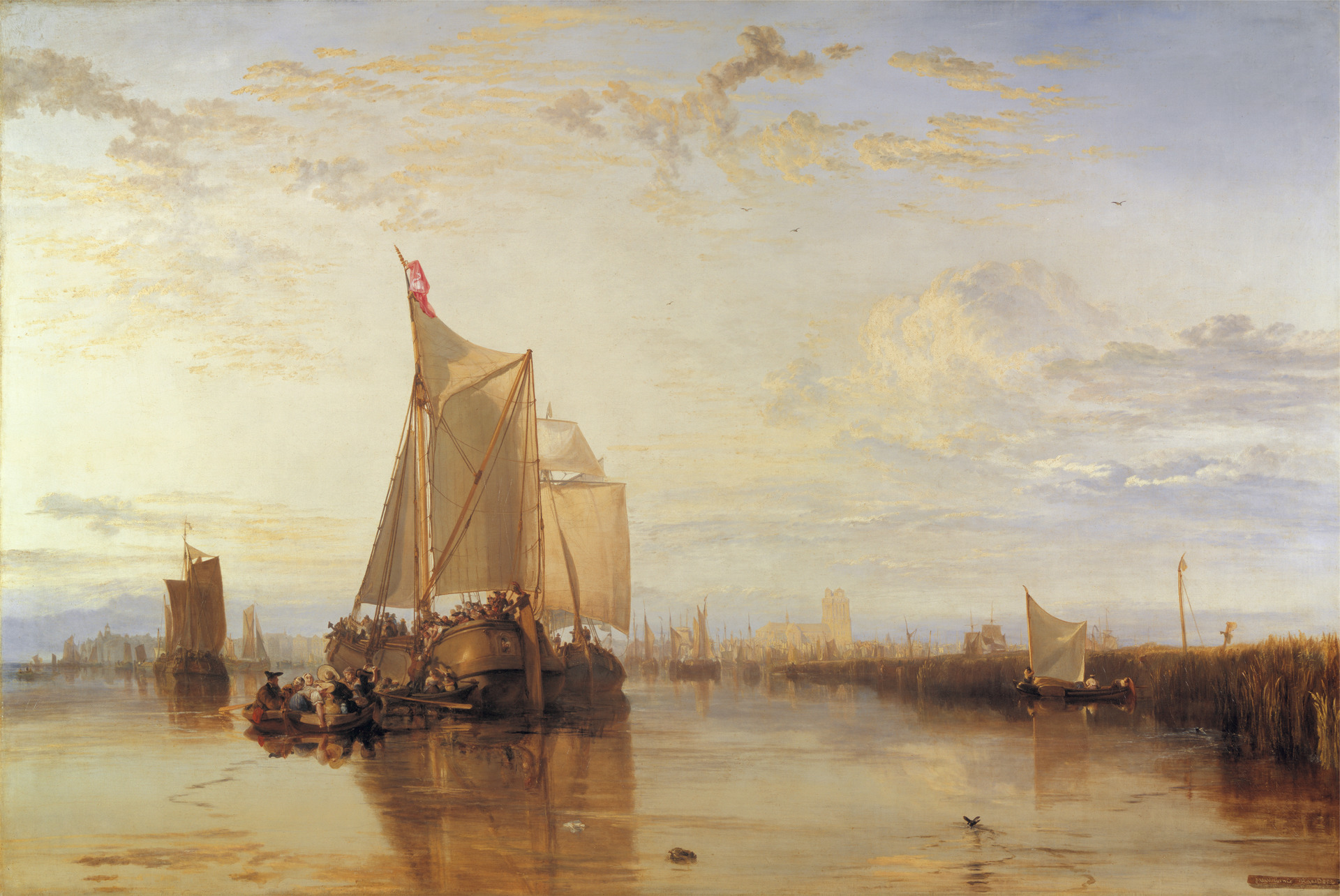
- Artist: J. M. W. Turner
- Year: 1818
- Medium: Oil on canvas
- Dimensions: 157.5 cm × 233.7 cm (62.0 in × 92.0 in)
- Location: Yale Center for British Art, New Haven
- Accession: B1977.14.77
- Website: collections.britishart.yale.edu/catalog/tms:34

The Dort, or Dort or Dordrecht: The Dort Packet-boat from Rotterdam Becalmed is an 1818 painting by J. M. W. Turner, based on drawings made by him in mid September 1817. It shows a view of the harbour of Dordrecht. It is the finest example of the influence of Dutch marine painting on Turner's work.

Turner may have been inspired to produce it as a riposte to the success of Augustus Wall Callcott's The Entrance to the Pool of London. It was exhibited at the Royal Academy Exhibition of 1818 at Somerset House, where it was described by The Morning Chronicle as "one of the most magnificent pictures ever exhibited, and does honour to the age". In 1832, John Constable wrote of the picture, "I remember most of Turner's early works; amongst them one of singular intricacy and beauty; it was a canal with numerous boats making thousands of beautiful shapes, and I think the most complete work of a genius I ever saw".

It was purchased by Walter Fawkes for 500 guineas at the request of his son, and hung in the drawing room at Farnley Hall until it was bought by Paul Mellon in 1966. It was then donated to the Yale Center for British Art upon the founding of the centre.

The painting was included in the J. M. W. Turner: Romance and Reality exhibition at the Yale Center for British Art in 2025, which is also the 250th anniversary of the birth of Joseph Mallord William Turner (1775–1851).

== See also ==
- List of paintings by J. M. W. Turner
