= Market Day =

Market Day may refer to

- Market Day (painting), an 1807 painting by Augustus Wall Callcott
- Market Day, an Ignatz Award-winning graphic novel by James Sturm
- Market Day Local, an American food cooperative
- Business day
- Trading day
- A day, often set days in the week, sometimes more occasional, when a marketplace is open
