= Windsor Castle from the Thames =

Painting by J. M. W. Turner

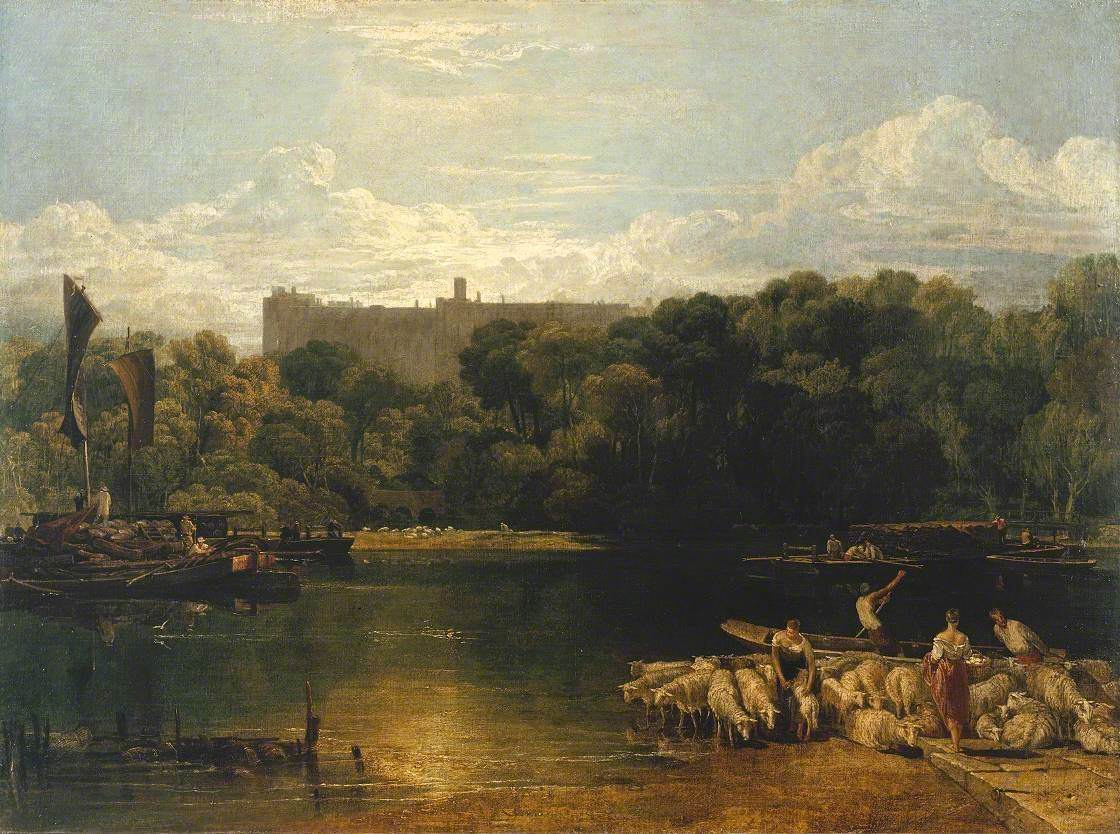
- Artist: J. M. W. Turner
- Year: 1805
- Medium: Oil on canvas
- Dimensions: 122 cm × 91 cm (48 in × 36 in)
- Location: Petworth House, Sussex
- Accession: T03870
- Website: tate.org.uk/...t03870

Windsor Castle from the Thames is an 1805 landscape painting by the British artist J.M.W. Turner. It features a view of Windsor Castle in Berkshire from the opposite side of the River Thames with barges and punts on the river and women herding sheep. At the time Windsor was a royal residence of George III and his family. It was produced while Turner was living at Sion Ferry House in Isleworth. It was acquired by the art collector George Wyndham, 3rd Earl of Egremont for his country estate of Petworth House in Sussex. It was exhibited at the Society of British Artists in 1834. It was later accepted by government in lieu, and is part of the collection of the Tate Britain but remains in situ at Petworth. Turner also produced The Thames at Windsor and The Thames at Eton featuring nearby Eton College which was acquired for Petworth.

== See also ==
- List of paintings by J. M. W. Turner
- Windsor from Eton, an 1809 painting by Augustus Wall Callcott

== Bibliography ==
- Bailey, Anthony. J.M.W. Turner: Standing in the Sun. Tate Enterprises, 2013.
- Hamilton, James. Turner's Britain. Merrell, 2003.
- Wilton, Andrew. Turner in His Time. H.N. Abrams, 1987.
