= The Entrance to the Pool of London =

Painting by Augustus Wall Callcott

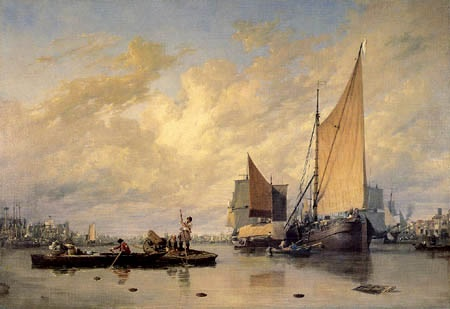
- Artist: Augustus Wall Callcott
- Year: 1816
- Type: Oil on canvas, landscape painting
- Dimensions: 153 cm × 221 cm (60 in × 87 in)
- Location: Bowood House; Wiltshire

The Entrance to the Pool of London is an 1816 landscape painting by the British artist Augustus Wall Callcott. It depicts a view of the Pool of London, a stretch of the River Thames, east of London Bridge.

Callcott drew heavily on the style of the seventeenth century Dutch artist Aelbert Cuyp, one of the Old Masters of the Dutch Golden Age painting. The painting was displayed at the Royal Academy Exhibition of 1816 at Somerset House in London. His rival J.M.W. Turner was greatly impressed with the work and his own Dort or Dordrecht, exhibited in 1818, was likely to have been a riposte.

The painting was commissioned by the Whig politician, the Marquess of Lansdowne, for his country estate, Bowood House, in Wiltshire.

== Bibliography ==
- Bryant, Julius. Kenwood, Paintings in the Iveagh Bequest. Yale University Press, 2003.
- Highfill, Philip H, Burnim, Kalman A. & Langhans, Edward A. A Biographical Dictionary of Actors, Actresses, Musicians, Dancers, Managers and Other Stage Personnel in London, 1660-1800: Cabanel to Cory. SIU Press, 1975.
- Tracy, Nicholas. Britannia’s Palette: The Arts of Naval Victory. McGill-Queen's Press, 2007.
