= Littlehampton Pier =

Painting by Augustus Wall Callcott

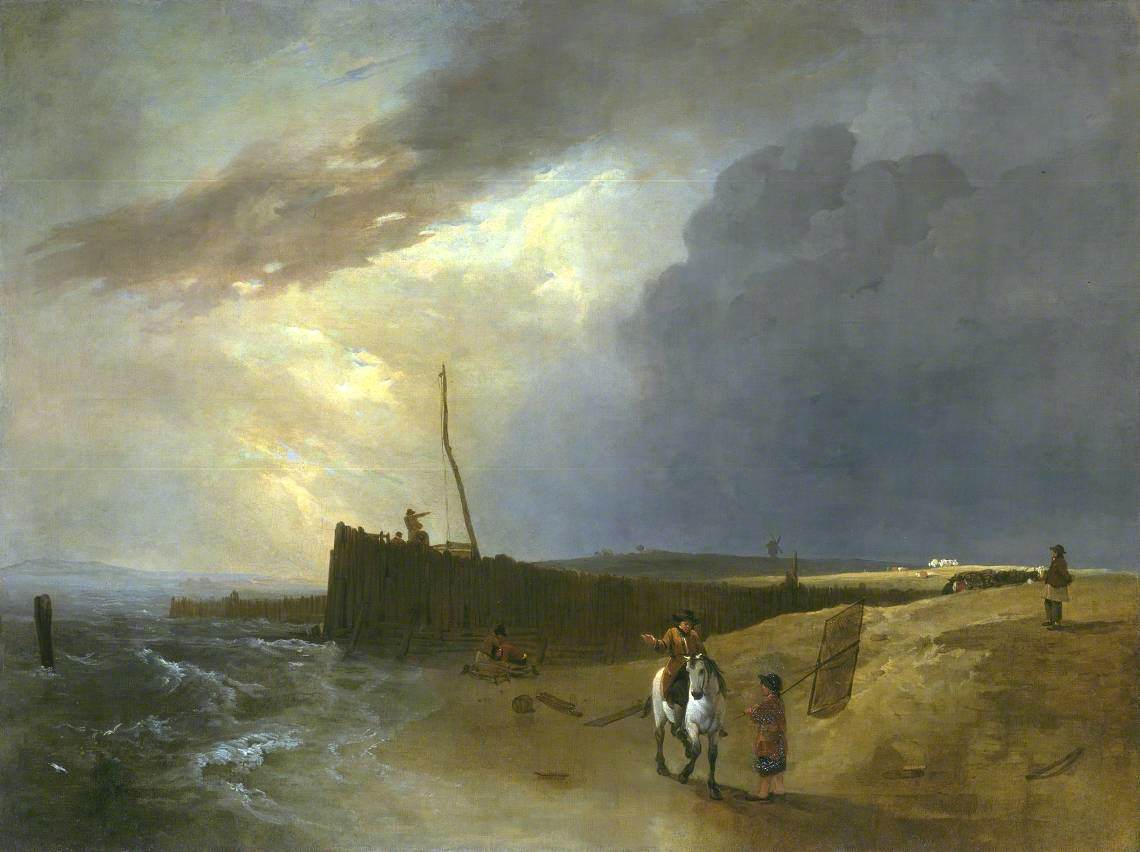
- Artist: Augustus Wall Callcott
- Year: 1811–12
- Type: Oil on canvas, landscape painting
- Dimensions: 141 cm × 106.7 cm (56 in × 42.0 in)
- Location: Tate Britain; London

Littlehampton Pier is an oil on canvas landscape painting by the British artist Augustus Wall Callcott, from 1811-1812. It depicts a view of the pier at the port of Littlehampton in Sussex on the southern coast of England. Callcott, a friend and rival of J.M.W. Turner, developed a reputation as one of Britain's leading landscape artists during the Regency era.

It was displayed at the Royal Academy's Summer Exhibition of 1812 at Somerset House. The painting was acquired by the prominent art collector Sir John Leicester. It was then acquired by Robert Vernon who donated it to the National Gallery in 1847 as part of the Vernon Gift. Today it is in the collection of Tate Britain in Pimlico.

== Bibliography ==
- Noon, Patrick & Bann, Stephen. Constable to Delacroix: British Art and the French Romantics. Tate, 2003.
- Wright, Christopher, Gordon, Catherine May & Smith, Mary Peskett. British and Irish Paintings in Public Collections: An Index of British and Irish Oil Paintings by Artists Born Before 1870 in Public and Institutional Collections in the United Kingdom and Ireland. Yale University Press, 2006.
