= Entrance to Pisa from Leghorn =

Painting by Augustus Wall Callcott

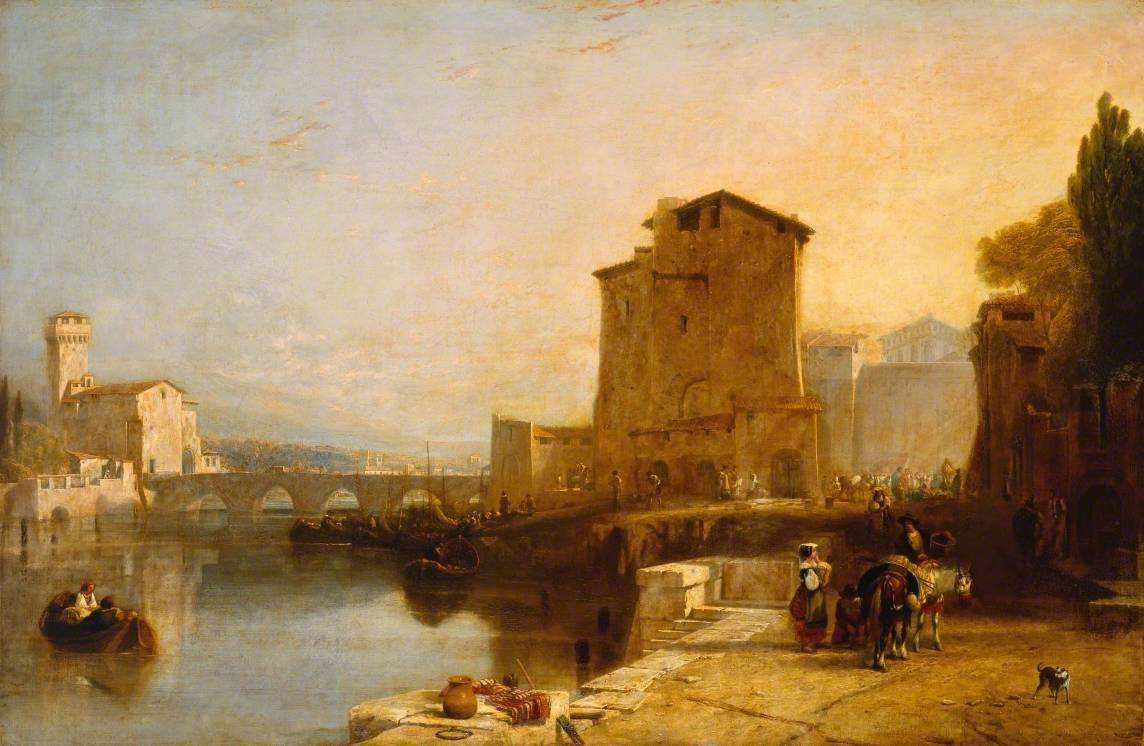
- Artist: Augustus Wall Callcott
- Year: 1833
- Type: Oil on canvas, landscape painting
- Dimensions: 106.7 cm × 162.6 cm (42.0 in × 64.0 in)
- Location: Tate Britain; London

Entrance to Pisa from Leghorn is an oil on canvas landscape painting by the British artist Augustus Wall Callcott, from 1833. Callcott was a leading British landscape painter of the Regency era and a friend and rival of J.M.W. Turner. It was one of several paintings that he produced inspired by his honeymoon in Italy in 1828. The painting was displayed at the Royal Academy's Exhibition of 1833 at Somerset House in London. Today it is in the collection of the Tate Britain, in Pimlico, having been donated to the nation by the art collector Robert Vernon, in 1847 as part of the Vernon Gift.

== Bibliography ==
- Herrmann, Luke. Nineteenth Century British Painting. Charles de la Mare, 2000.
- Wright, Christopher, Gordon, Catherine May & Smith, Mary Peskett. British and Irish Paintings in Public Collections: An Index of British and Irish Oil Paintings by Artists Born Before 1870 in Public and Institutional Collections in the United Kingdom and Ireland. Yale University Press, 2006.
