= Portrait of Princess Charlotte Augusta of Wales =

1817 painting by George Dawe

Princess Charlotte Augusta of Wales
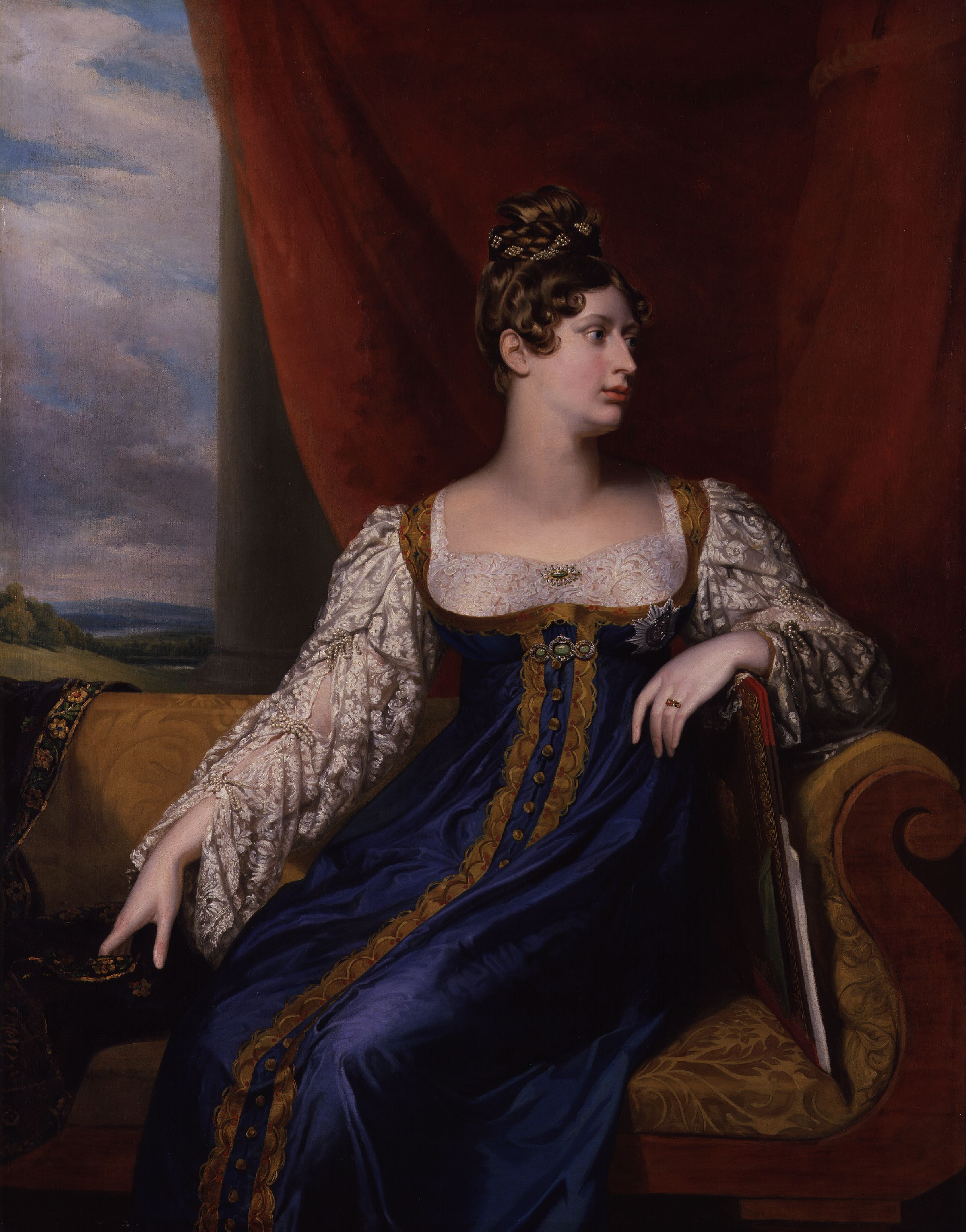
- Artist: George Dawe
- Year: 1817
- Type: Oil on canvas, portrait
- Dimensions: 139.7 cm × 108 cm (55.0 in × 43 in)
- Location: National Portrait Gallery, London

Princess Charlotte Augusta of Wales is an 1817 portrait painting by the British artist George Dawe depicting Princess Charlotte of Wales, the daughter of the Prince Regent.

== History and description ==
Charlotte was the only child of the Regent, the future George IV and his estranged wife Caroline of Brunswick, and was next-in-line to the British throne after her father and grandfather George III – who had in 1811 been declared insane beginning the Regency era. The painting was exhibited in the year of her death, in childbirth, following her marriage to Prince Leopold in 1816. Her unexpected death led to a succession crisis for the British monarchy until the birth of her cousin Queen Victoria in 1819.

Charlotte is depicted wearing the Russian Order of Saint Catherine. Britain and Russia had been allies during the recent Napoleonic Wars and Charlotte was presented the award by Empress Maria Feodorovna. The portfolio under her left arm is likely a reference to her artistic accomplishments. The painting was displayed at the Royal Academy Exhibition of 1818 at Somerset House. It is now part of the collection of the National Portrait Gallery in London with a copy in the Royal Collection. The same year Thomas Lawrence also produced a portrait of the princess.

== Bibliography ==
- Perry, Lara. History's Beauties: Women in the National Portrait Gallery, 1856–1900. Ashgate Publishing, 2006.
- Stott, Anne M. The Lost QueenThe Life and Tragedy of the Prince Regent's Daughter. Pen & Sword, 2020.
