= Windsor from Eton =

Painting by Augustus Wall Callcott

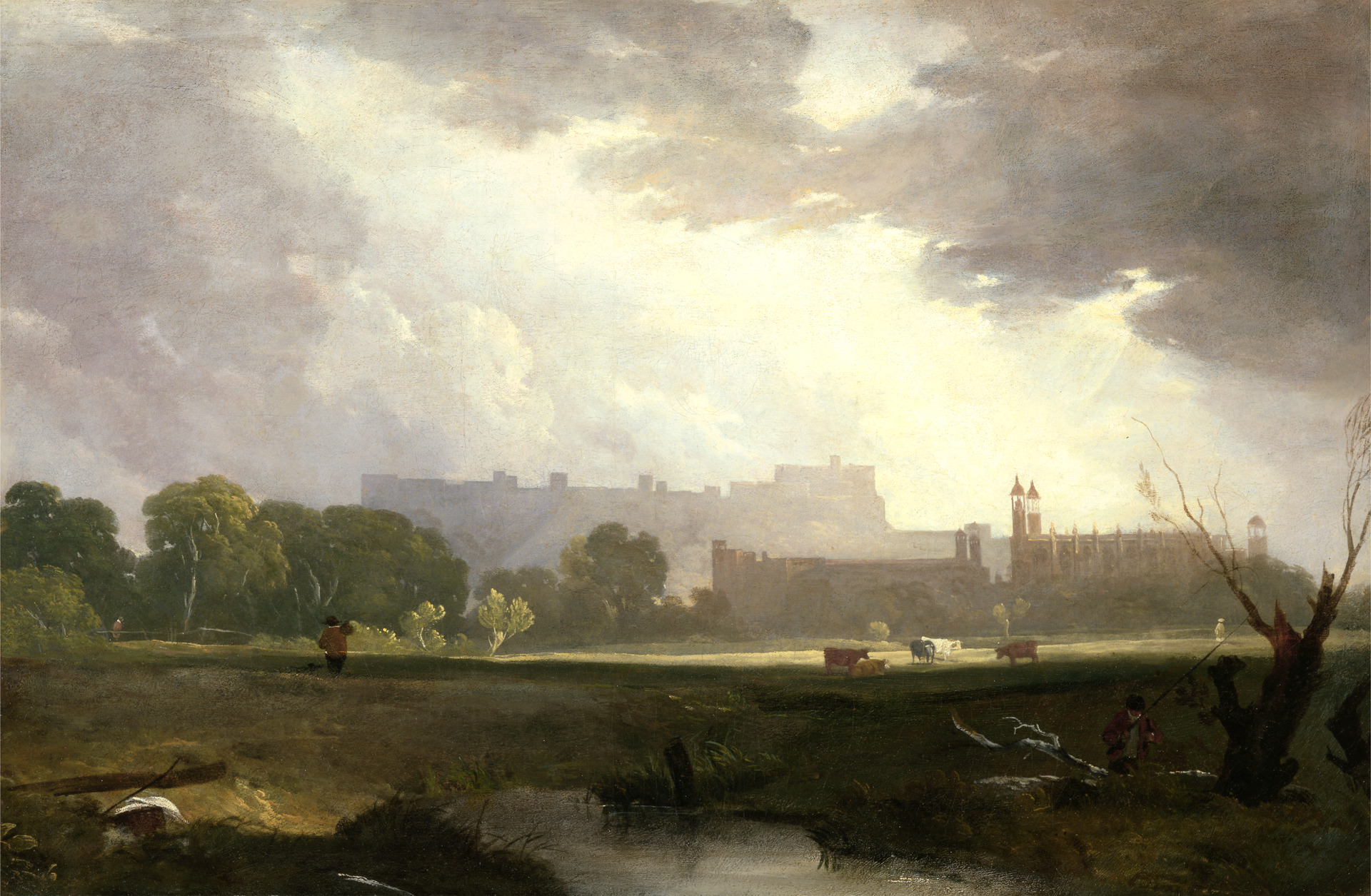
- Artist: Augustus Wall Callcott
- Year: 1809
- Type: Oil on canvas, landscape painting
- Dimensions: 74.9 cm × 112.4 cm (29.5 in × 44.3 in)
- Location: Yale Center for British Art; New Haven

Windsor from Eton is an oil on canvas landscape painting by the British artist Augustus Wall Callcott, from 1809.

== History and description ==
If features a view of Windsor Castle from across the River Thames at Eton. Eton College Chapel is visible on the right. At the time Windsor was the residence of George III and his family and Callcott uses the ancient tradition of the country's monarchy at a time when Britain was fighting the Napoleonic Wars. It was displayed at the Royal Academy's Summer Exhibition of 1809 at Somerset House in London. Today the painting is in the collection of the Yale Center for British Art in Connecticut. Callcott also produced a landscape entitled Windsor Castle from the Old Bridge now in the Laing Art Gallery in Newcastle upon Tyne.

== See also ==
- Windsor Castle from the Thames, an 1805 painting by J.M.W. Turner
