= Raby Castle (painting) =

Painting by J.M.W. Turner

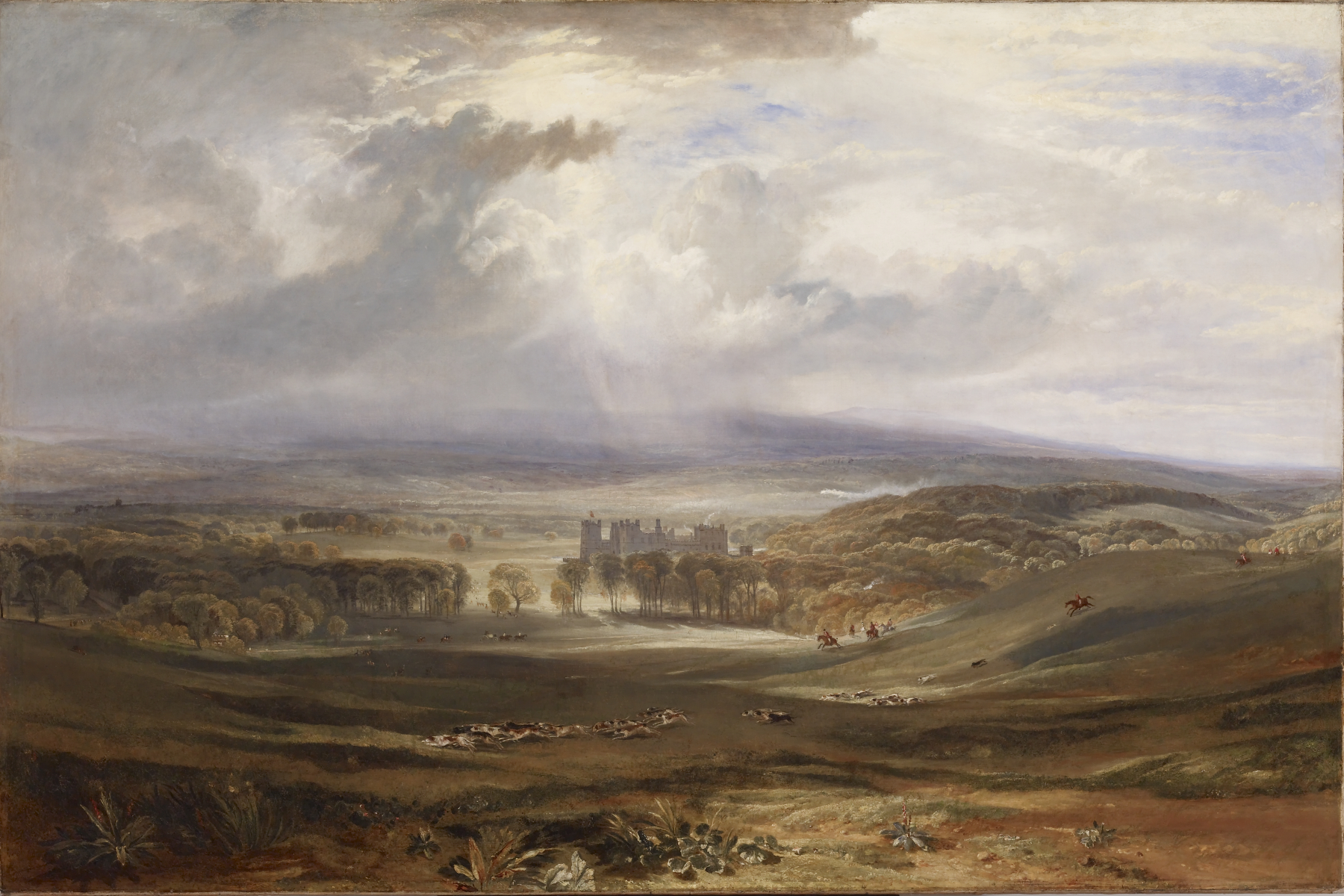
- Artist: Joseph Mallord William Turner
- Year: 1817
- Type: Oil on canvas, landscape painting
- Dimensions: 119 cm × 180.6 cm (47 in × 71.1 in)
- Location: Walters Art Museum, Baltimore

Raby Castle is an 1817 landscape painting by the British artist J.M.W. Turner. It depicts a view of Raby Castle, a country house in County Durham in Northern England. The work was commissioned by the property's owner the Earl of Darlington. A topographical study, it is less experimental than much of the artist's later work. Originally it featured also painted a mounted huntsman but Turner later painted it out after criticism that it was another "detestable fox-hunting scene". Turner wished to emphasise the landscape genre rather than the popular sporting genre, often featuring hunting and shooting scenes which had lower prestige. Its inclusion apparently upset many of Turner's supporters.

The painting was first displayed in its unchanged state at the Royal Academy's Summer Exhibition of 1818 at Somerset House in London. Today the painting is in the collection of the Walters Art Museum in Baltimore, Maryland, having been acquired in 1931.

== See also ==
- List of paintings by J. M. W. Turner

== Bibliography ==
- Hamilton, James. Turner - A Life. Sceptre, 1998.
- Wallen, Matin. Fox. Reaktion Books, 2006.
