= The Errand Boy (painting) =

Painting by David Wilkie

- Artist: David Wilkie
- Year: 1818
- Type: Oil on panel, genre painting
- Dimensions: 38 cm × 50.5 cm (15 in × 19.9 in)
- Location: Private collection

The Errand Boy is an 1818 oil painting by the British artist David Wilkie. A genre painting, it depicts a delivery boy bringing some goods to a family in rural England. He is watched warily by the older woman, suggesting she thinks he may be overcharging them.

The Scottish artist Wilkie developed a reputation for his scenes of ordinary life, paying homage to Dutch Golden Age painting, and enjoyed great popularity in the Regency Era. This work was originally acquired by the art collector Sir John Swinburne. It was displayed at the Royal Academy Exhibition of 1818 held at Somerset House in London and again at a retrospective staged by the British Institution in 1842. It was auctioned by Christie's in 2022. A print based on the painting was produced by the engraver Abraham Raimbach.

== Bibliography ==
- Chiego, William Joseph. Sir David Wilkie of Scotland, 1785-1841. North Carolina Museum of Art, 1987
- Tromans, Nicholas. David Wilkie: The People's Painter. Edinburgh University Press, 2007.
