= Portrait of Francis Leggatt Chantrey =

Painting by Thomas Phillips

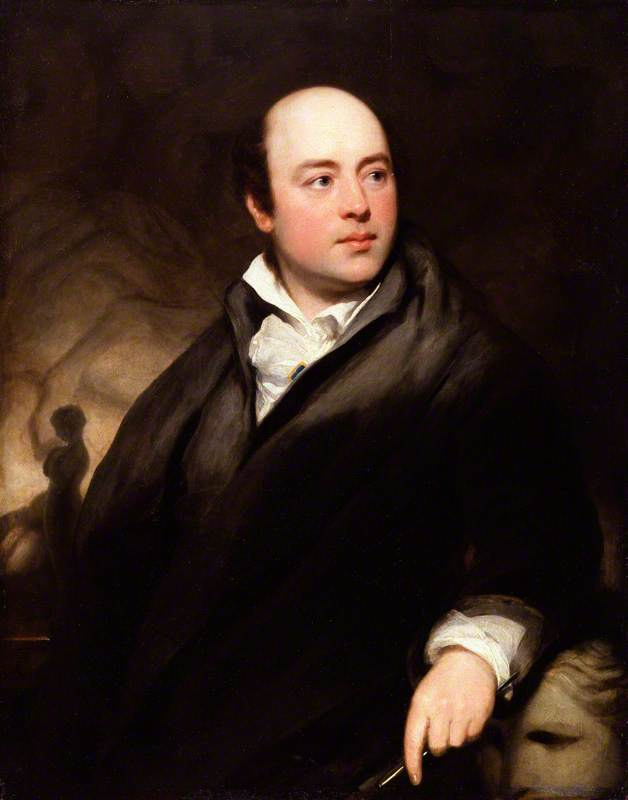
- Artist: Thomas Phillips
- Year: 1818
- Type: Oil on panel, portrait painting
- Dimensions: 91.4 cm × 77.2 cm (36.0 in × 30.4 in)
- Location: National Portrait Gallery, London

Portrait of Francis Leggatt Chantrey is an oil on canvas portrait painting by the English artist Thomas Phillips, from 1818. It is a depiction of the sculptor Francis Leggatt Chantrey.

== History and description ==
The son of a farmer Chantrey established himself as a leading sculptor, producing busts of society figures as well as larger public monuments. He established the Chantrey Bequest which supports the acquisition of British art for national collections.

Phillips was a noted portraitist of the Regency era and fellow member of the Royal Academy. He depicts Chantrey holding a modelling tool and resting his arm against one of his works, a marble head. In the background is a statuette of Lady Louisa Russell. The work was displayed at the Royal Academy's Summer Exhibition in 1818 and again at the British Institution in 1846. The painting is now in the collection of the National Portrait Gallery in London, having been acquired in 1859 as a gift from Chantrey's widow.

== Bibliography ==
- Dunkerley, S. Francis Chantrey, Sculptor: From Norton to Knighthood. Hallamshire Press, 1995.
- Potts, Alex. Sir Francis Chantrey, 1781-1841: Sculptor of the Great. National Portrait Gallery, 1980.
- Walker, Richard John Boileau. Regency Portraits, Volume 1. National Portrait Gallery, 1985.
