= Market Day (painting) =

Painting by Augustus Wall Callcott

- Artist: Augustus Wall Callcott
- Year: 1807
- Type: Oil on canvas, landscape painting
- Dimensions: 115 cm × 236 cm (45 in × 93 in)
- Location: Tabley House, Cheshire

Market Day is an 1807 landscape painting by the British artist Augustus Wall Callcott. It depicts a country road where various rural figures are bringing their goods to town for market day. It is part of the tradition of Romantic landscapes and scenes of everyday life that enjoyed popularity around the period. Callcott was a popular artist during the Regency era, often drawing comparisons to his contemporary J.M.W. Turner. It is also known as Landscape, Market Day. It was displayed at the Royal Academy Exhibition of 1807 held at Somerset House in London. It drew widespread attention and praise, although John Constable was critical of it.

The picture was acquired by the prominent art collector Sir John Leicester who two years earlier had bought his The Water Mill. Today the painting is part of the collection of Tabley House in Cheshire.

== Bibliography ==
- Brown, David Blayney, Hemingway, Andrew & Lyles, Anne. Romantic Landscapes: The Norwich School of Painters. Harry N. Abrams, 2000.
- Cannon-Brookes, Peter. Paintings from Tabley. Heim Gallery, 1989.
- Cove, Sarah. Constable: The Great Landscapes. Tate, 2006.
