= Augustus Wall Callcott =

English painter

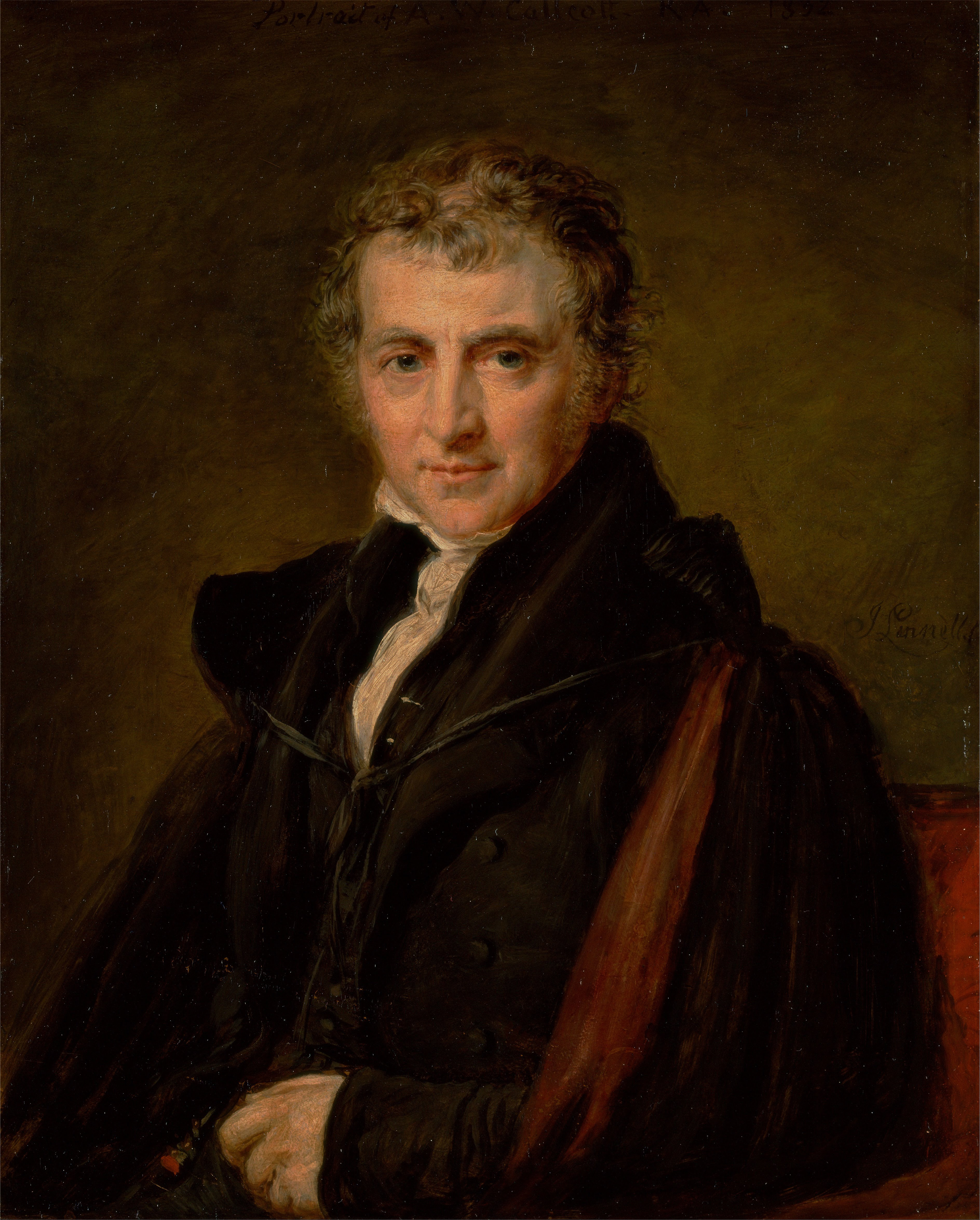
- Portrait by John Linnel, 1831
- Born: 20 February 1779
- Died: 25 November 1844 (aged 65)
- Education: Royal Academy Schools
- Style: landscape art
- Spouse: Maria Graham
- Elected: Royal Academy of Arts

Sir Augustus Wall Callcott RA (20 February 1779 – 25 November 1844) was an English landscape painter.

== Life and work ==
Callcott was born at Kensington Gravel Pits, a village on the western edge of London, in the area now known as Notting Hill Gate. His first study was music and he sang for several years in the choir of Westminster Abbey. But at the age of twenty he had determined to give up music, became a student of the Royal Academy, and began his artistic career as a painter of portraits under the tuition of John Hoppner. The first picture he exhibited was a portrait of Miss Roberts, and its success at the Royal Academy Exhibition of 1799 is said to have led to his final choice of painting as a profession.

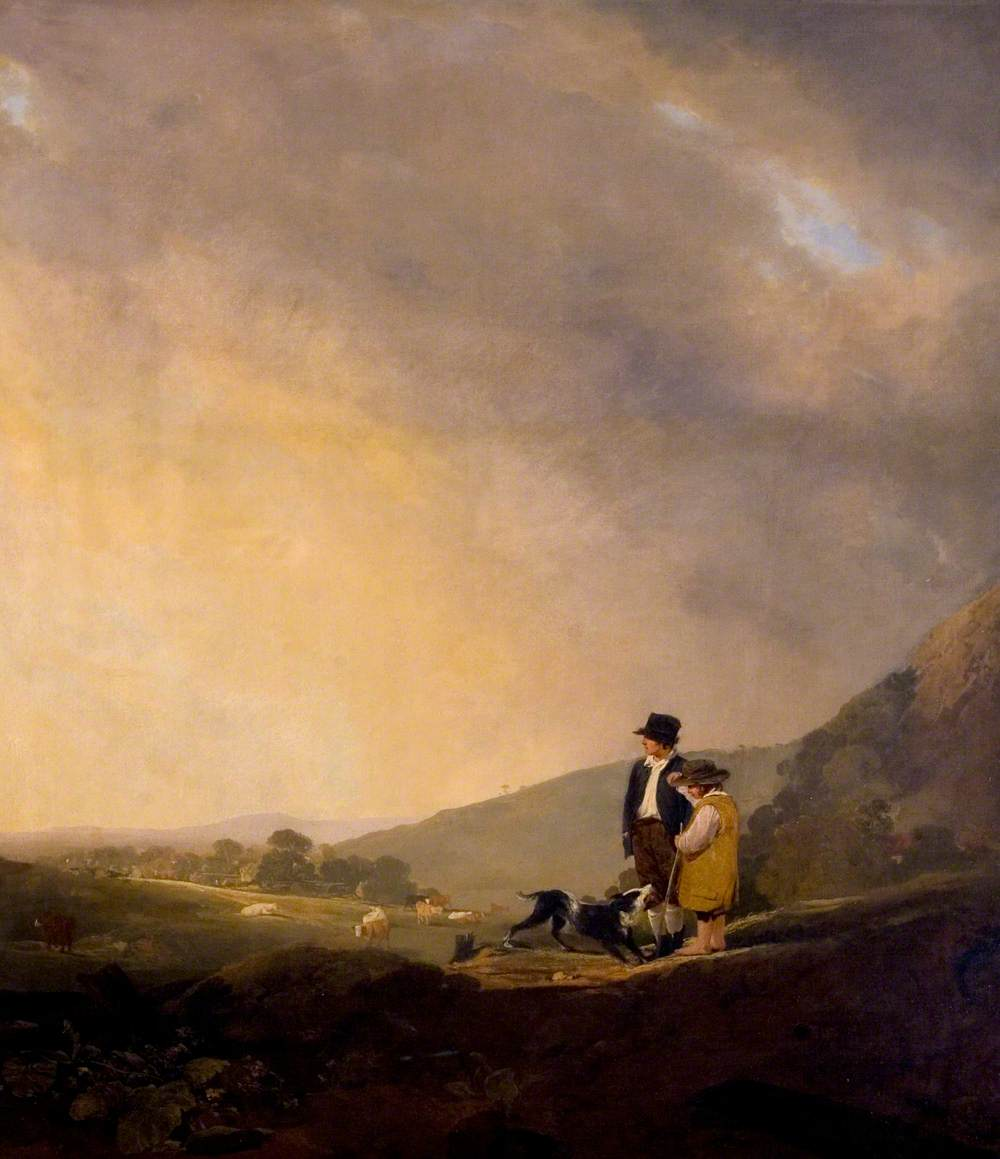
Cow Boys, 1807

His preference for landscape, including river and coast scenery, soon showed itself, and after 1804 he exhibited nothing but landscapes for many years. The skill of his execution, the elegance of his design, and the charming tone of his works caused his reputation to rise steadily. In 1806 he was elected an associate of the Royal Academy, and in 1810 a full Academician.

He enjoyed notable success with The Water Mill at the Royal Academy Exhibition of 1805 and then Market Day two years later, both bought by the art collector Sir John Leicester. The care which he bestowed upon his pictures restricted their number. From 1805 to 1810 he exhibited about four pictures a year, in 1811 ten pictures, and in 1812, six. From that year to 1822 he exhibited only seven works in all, but among these were some of his best and largest, such as The Entrance to the Pool of London (1816), The Mouth of the Tyne (1818), and A Dead Calm on the Medway (1820). Another important picture was Rochester (1824).

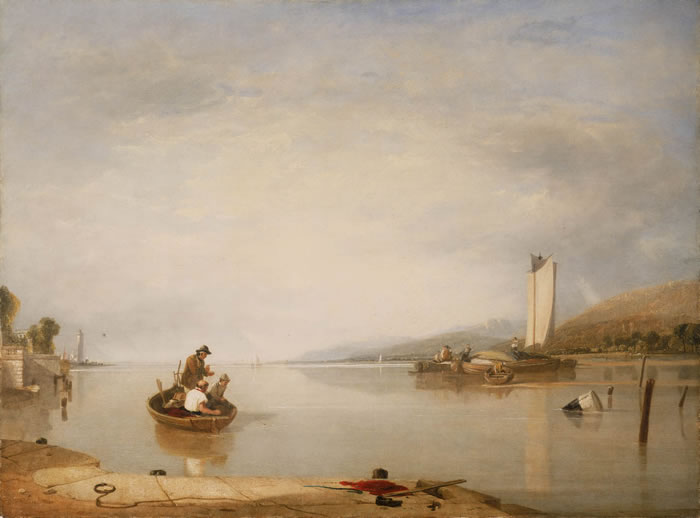
Dead Calm, 1827

Though his subjects down to this time were generally taken from the scenery of his own country, he had visited France and the Netherlands and had painted some Dutch and Flemish scenes before 1827, the year he married and went to Italy for the first time. His wife, Maria Graham, the widow of Captain Graham, R.N., had already attained considerable literary reputation. On their return from Italy they took up their residence at Kensington Gravel Pits, where he lived until his death, enjoying great popularity. In 1830 he began to exhibit Italian compositions, and after this year the subjects of his pictures were generally foreign. Though to the last his works were marked by charm of composition and sweetness of execution, those produced before 1827 are now held in most esteem.

On the accession of Queen Victoria in 1837, Callcott received the honour of knighthood. In that year he departed from his usual class of subjects, and exhibited a picture of Raffaelle and the Fornarina, with life-size figures, finished with great care, which was engraved by Lumb Stocks for the Art Union of London in 1843. This and Milton dictating to his Daughters, exhibited in 1840, were the most important of his figure paintings, of which rare class of his work the South Kensington Museum (Sheepshanks Collection) (now the Victoria and Albert Museum) contains two specimens, Anne Page and Slender and Falstaff and Simple. The museum also possesses several landscapes in oil and sketches in watercolour, etc.

The figures in his landscapes were often important parts of the composition, and were always gracefully designed and happily placed, as, for instance, in Dutch Peasants returning from Market.

In 1843 Callcott succeeded William Seguier as Surveyor of the Queen's Pictures. He died on 25 November 1844 and was buried in Kensal Green cemetery.

There are qualities in Callcott's work which gained the admiration of J. M. W. Turner and Thomas Stothard in his day. He was generous in his patronage of younger artists. But John Ruskin in the first volume of Modern Painters (1843), thought little of his work.

== Family ==
His wife, Maria, was a writer on art and travel. His brother, John Wall Callcott, was a noted composer.

Market Day, 1807

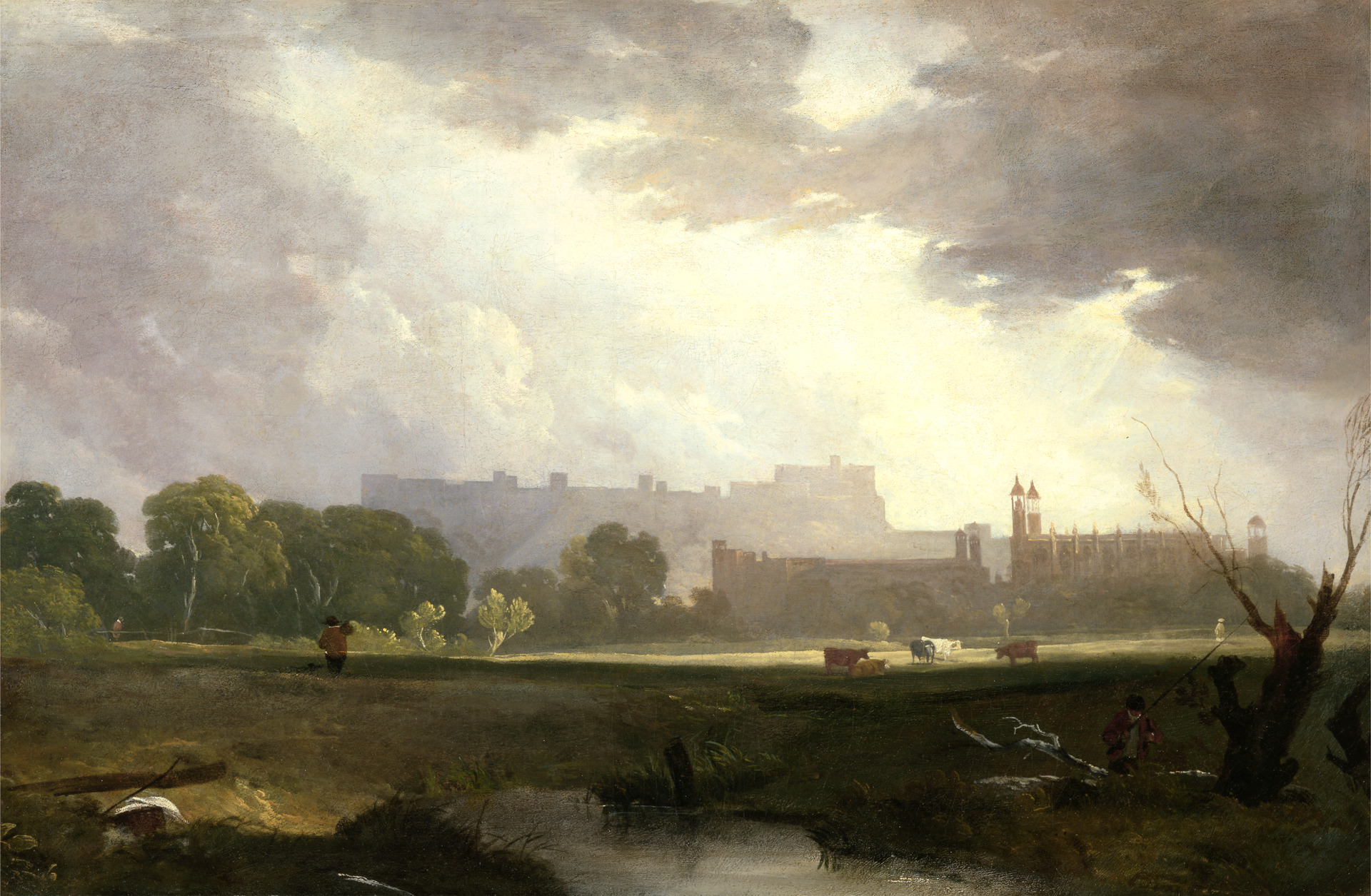
Windsor from Eton, 1809

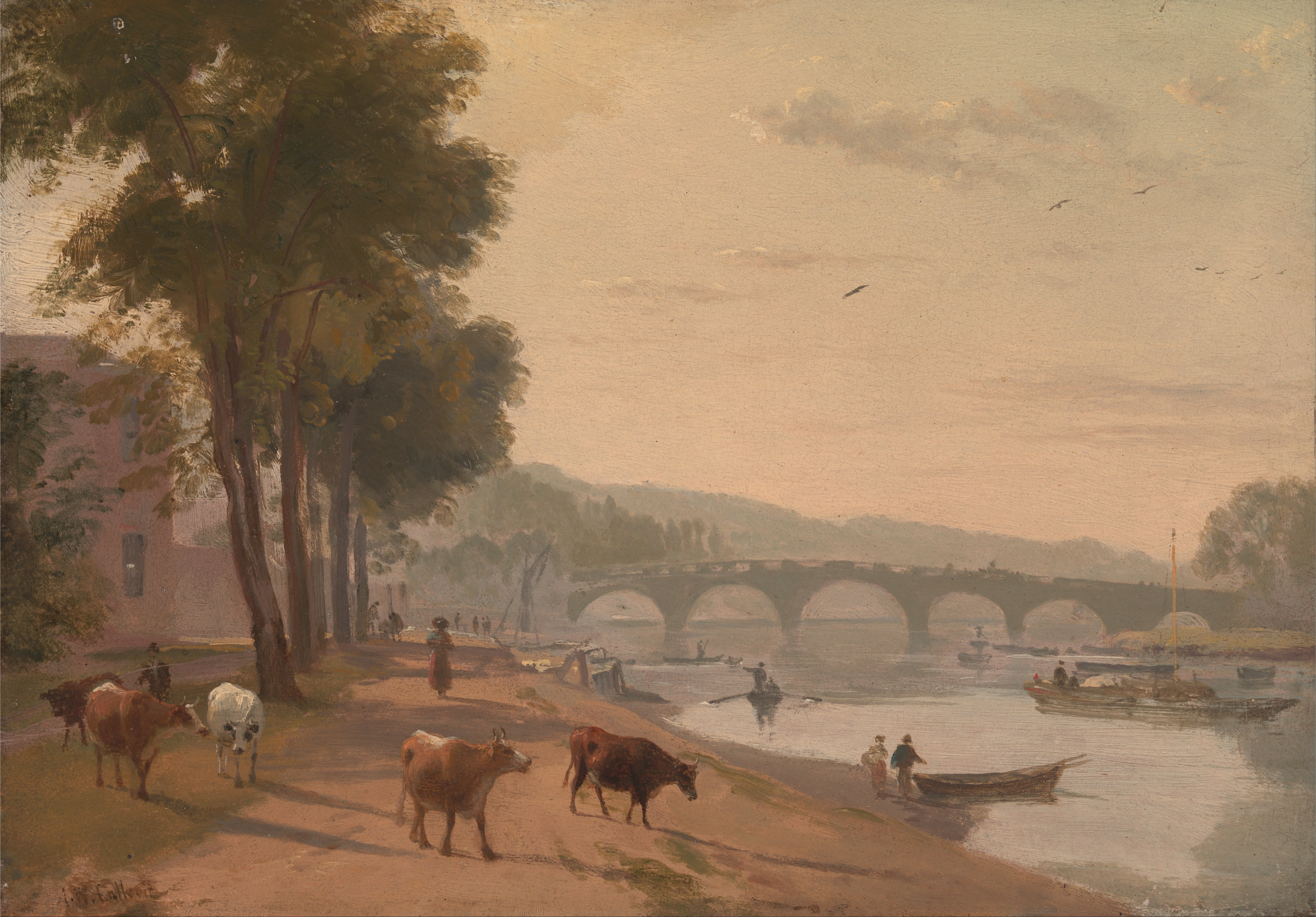
A View of Richmond Bridge, on the Thames, c.1810

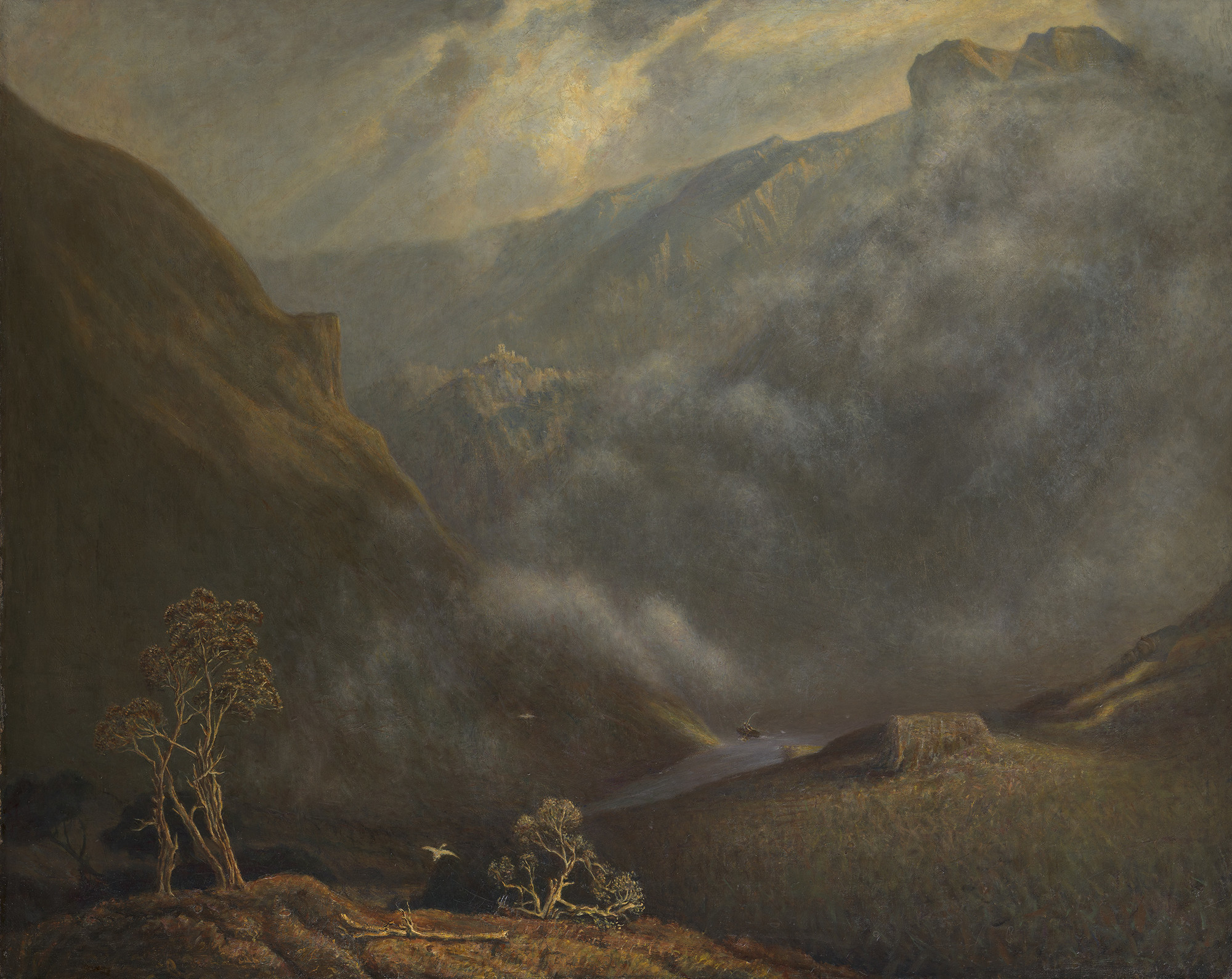
A Scene near Capel-Curig, North Wales, 1811

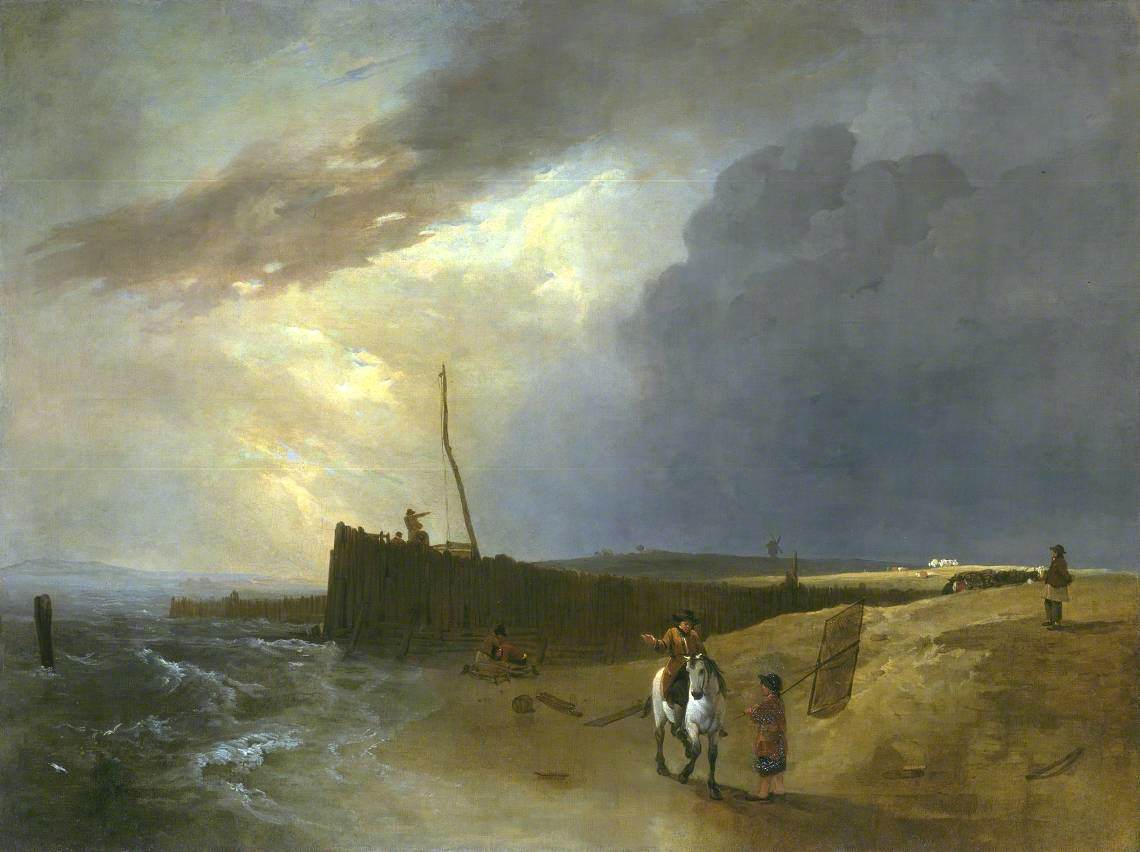
Littlehampton Pier, 1812

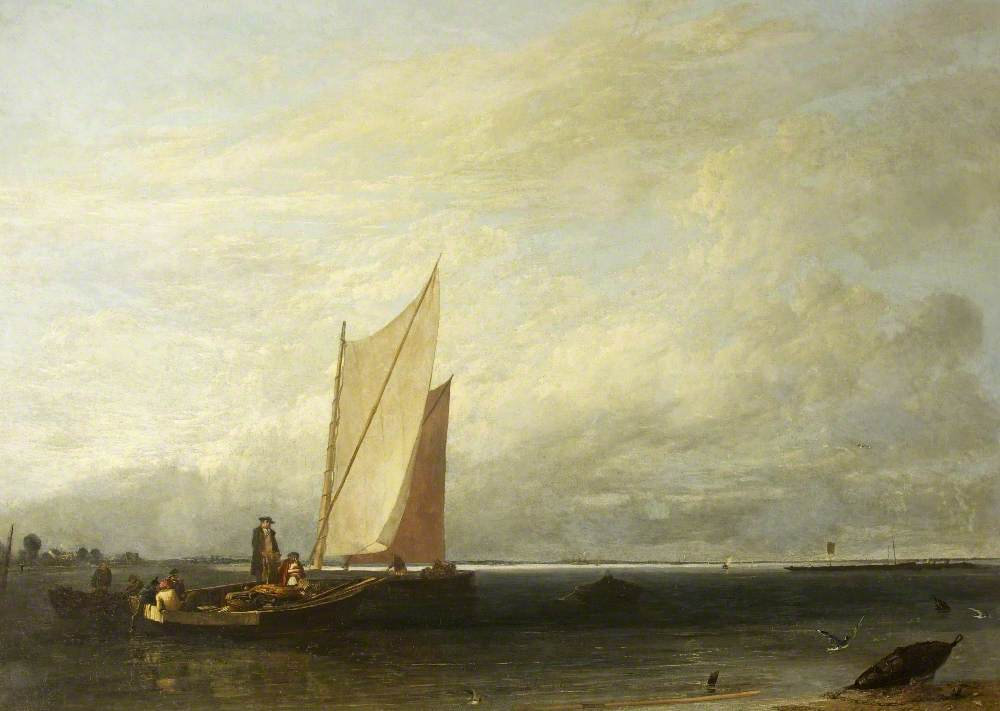
View of Southampton Water, 1815

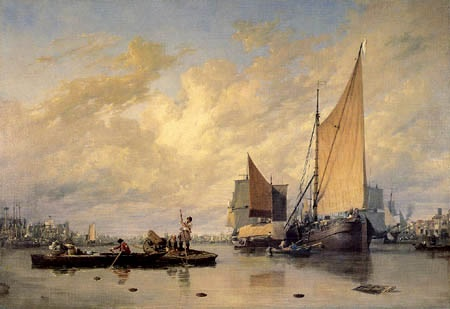
The Entrance to the Pool of London, 1816

Smugglers Alarmed, 1822

Rochester, 1824

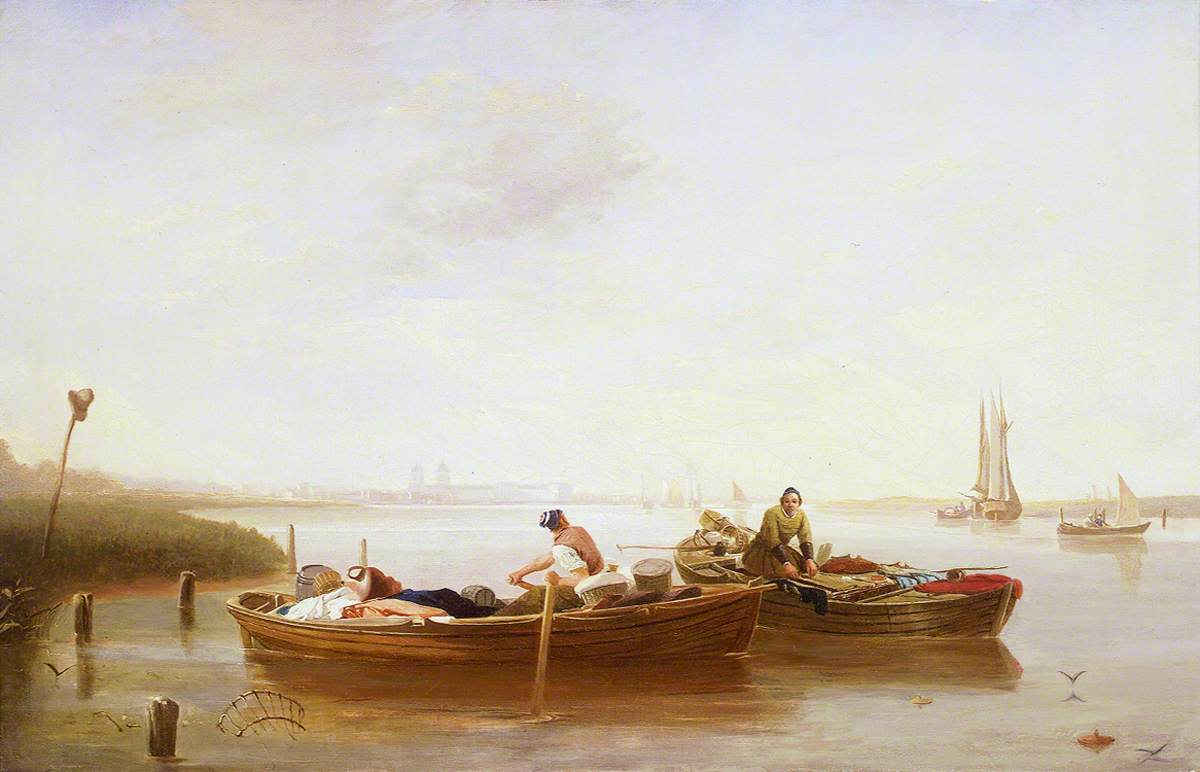
Greenwich from Blackwall Reach, 1830

The Passage Point, 1830

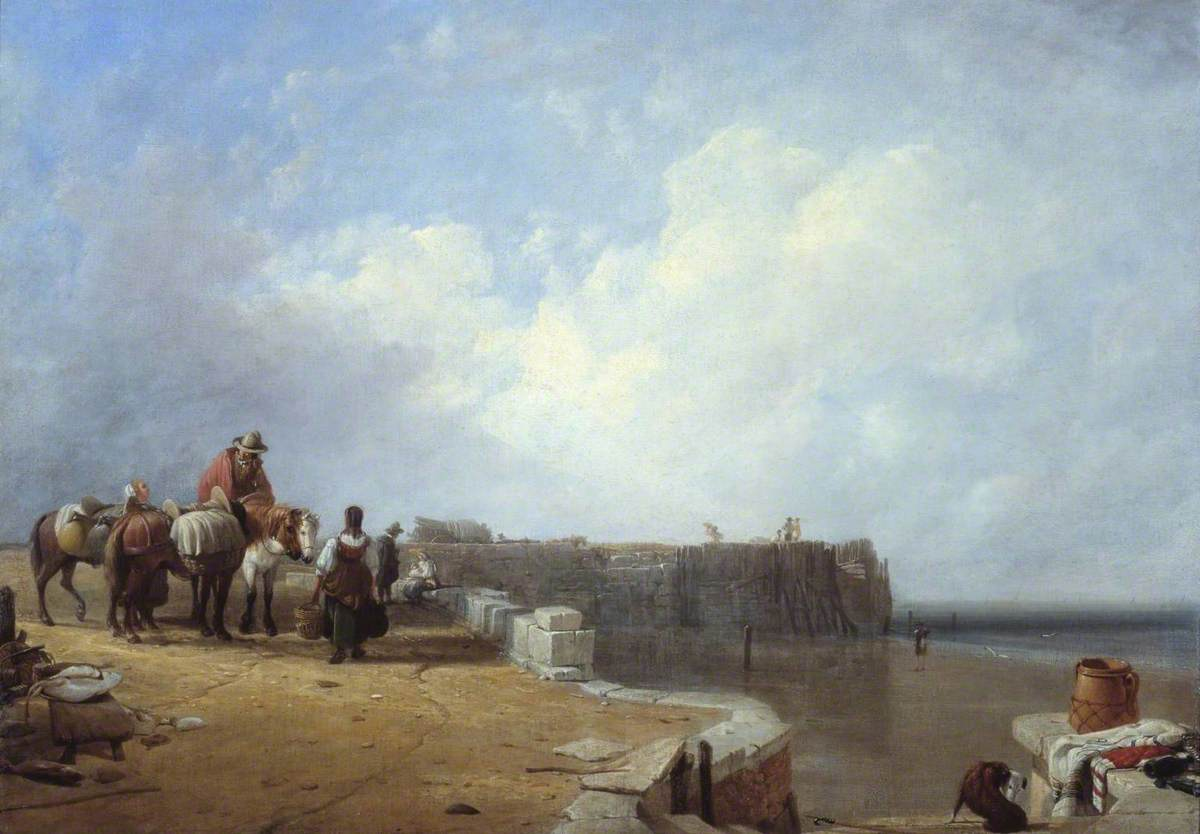
Dutch Coast Scene, 1832

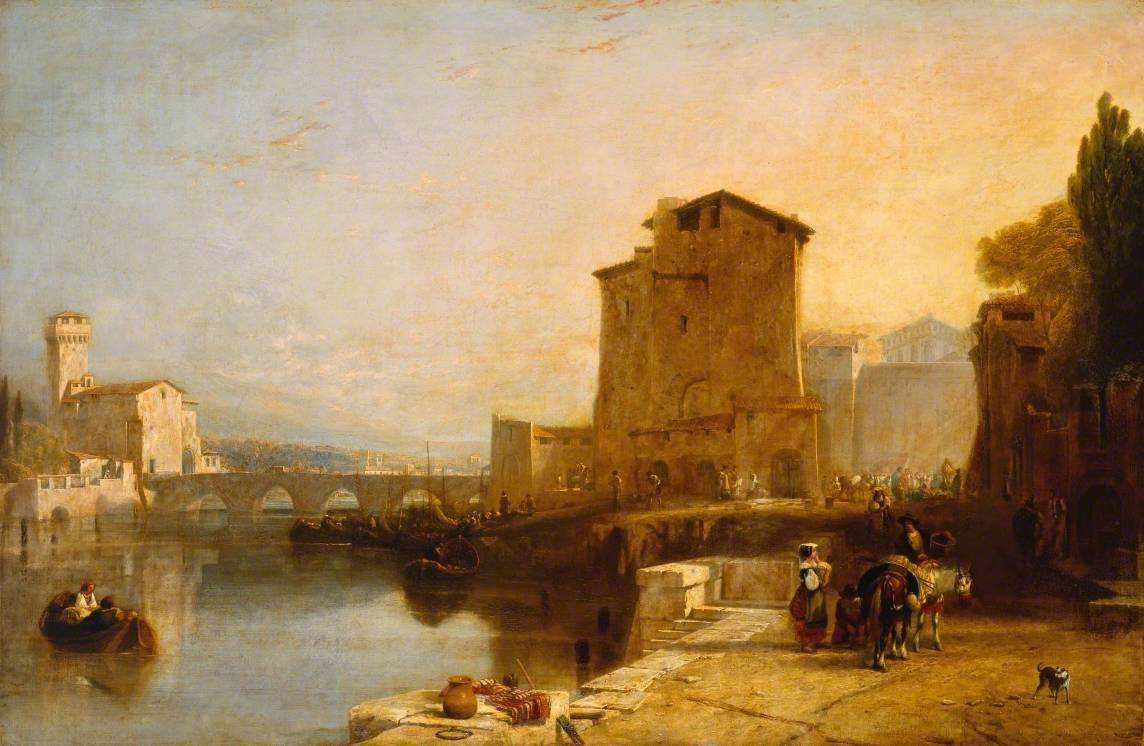
Entrance to Pisa from Leghorn, 1833

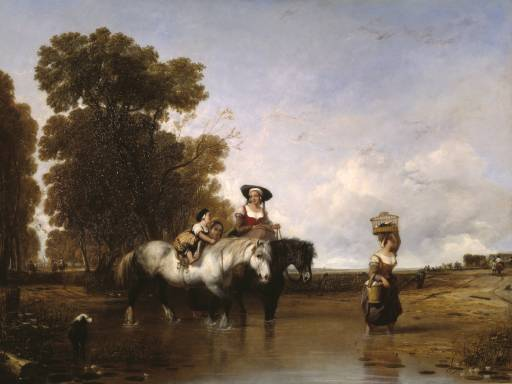
Returning from Market, 1834

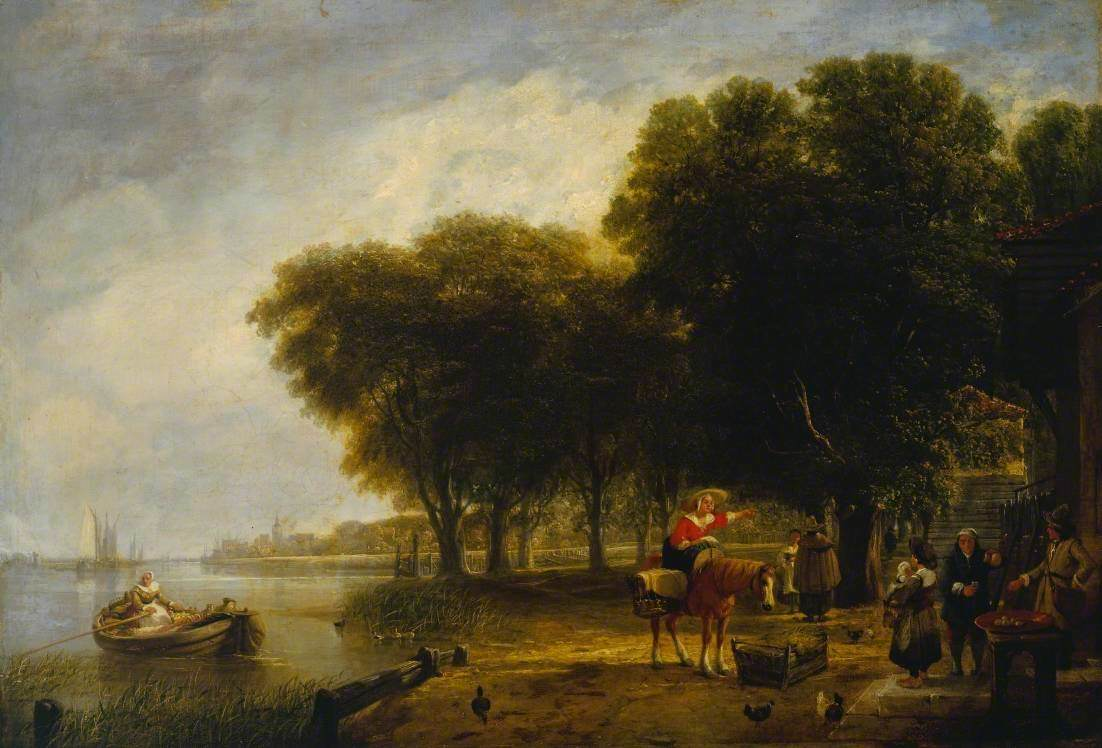
Dutch Peasants Waiting the Return of the Passage Boat, 1834

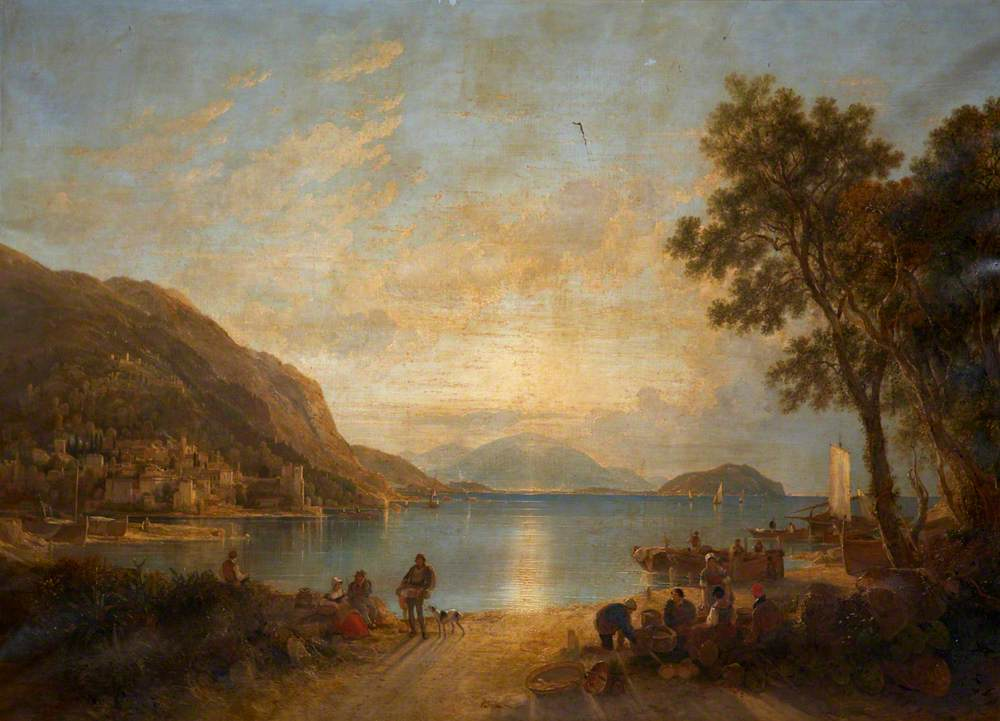
On an Italian Lake, 1835

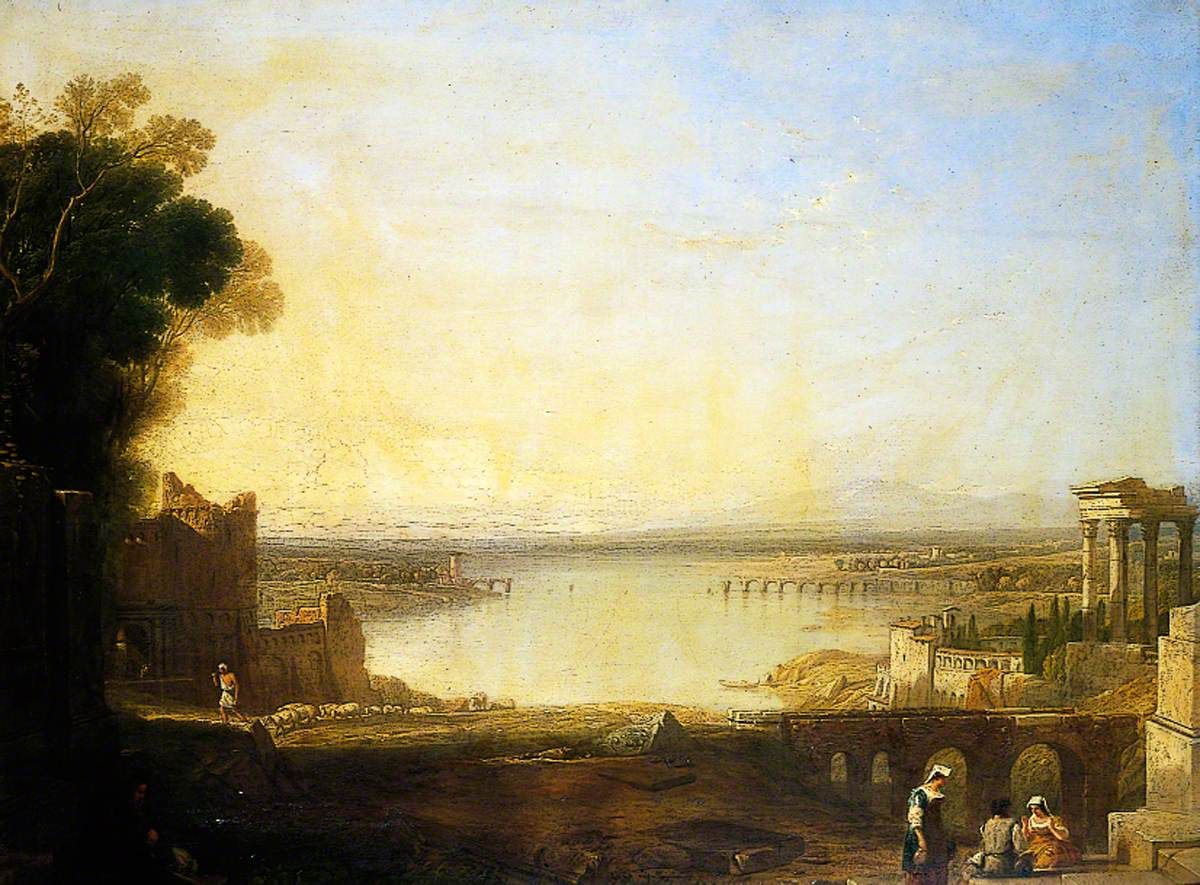
On the Tiber, 1840
