= Turner & Constable =

- Directed by: David Bickerstaff
- Production company: Seventh Art Productions
- Release date: 15 March 2026 (Germany)
- Running time: 91 minutes
- Country: United Kingdom
- Language: English

Turner & Constable is a 2026 documentary film which explores the relationship between rival painters J. M. W. Turner and John Constable. It was released as part of the 2025-2026 exhibition Turner and Constable: Rivals and Originals at Tate Britain.
