= John Howes (painter) =

English painter

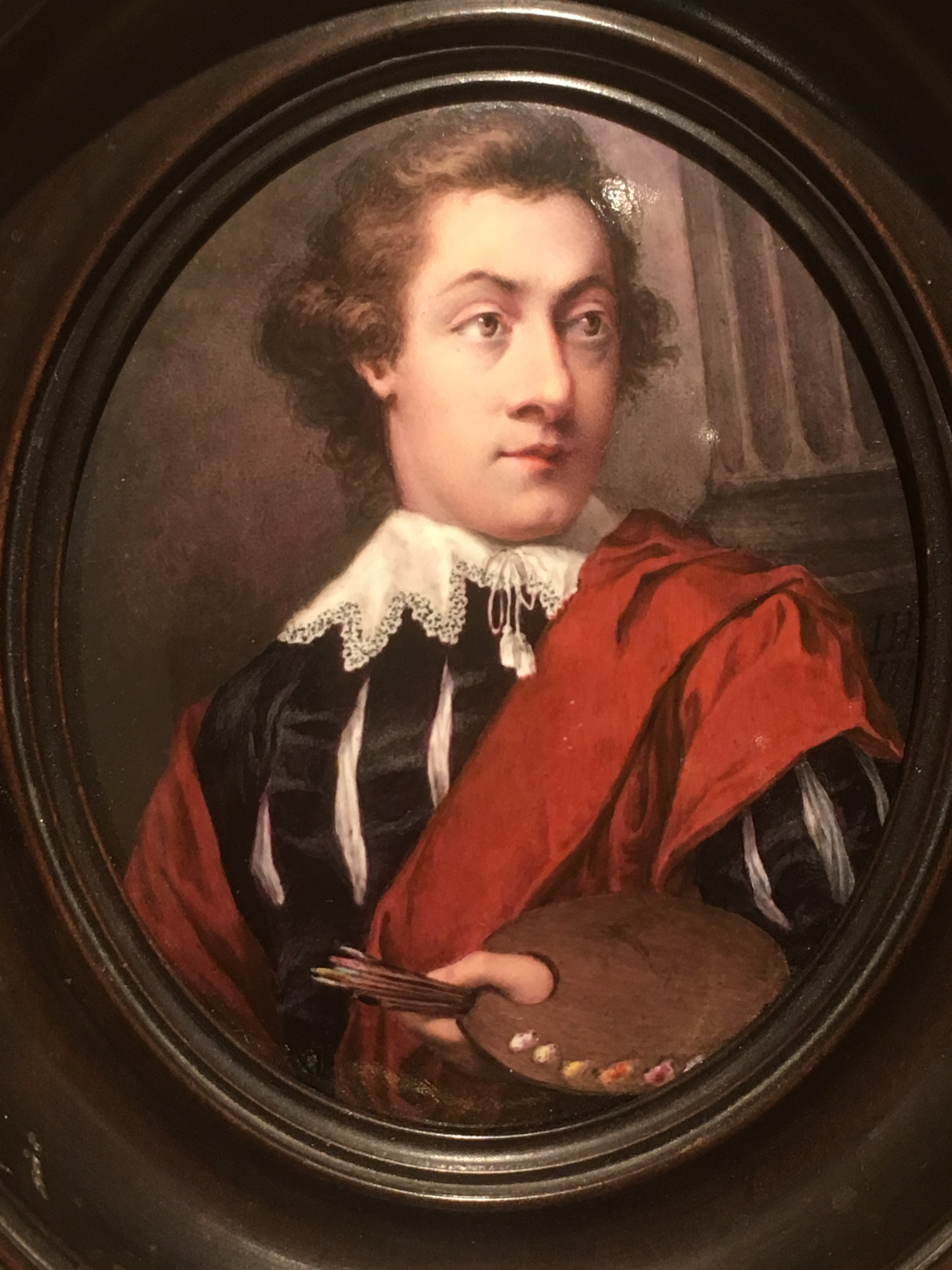
John Howes' self-portrait

John Howes (9 November 1750 – 17 December 1833) was an English painter and miniaturist notable for his work David Garrick unveiling a herm of Shakespeare and the Ephesian Diana and for two paintings inspired by Thomson's The Seasons Palemon and Lavinia in a Landscape and Celadon and Lavinia in a Landscape.

== Life and work ==
John Howes was born at 13 Fleet Street, near Temple Bar, London, the son of William Howes (clockmaker, goldsmith and master of the Company of Clockmakers in 1777) and Margaret, née Selby. He was baptised at St Dunstan-in-the-West on 14 November 1750. In 1764 Howes was apprenticed to Louis Benoimont as a goldsmith. He entered the recently founded Royal Academy of Arts School on 28 June 1770. His professor of painting was Edward Penny, who designed the silver medal which John Howes was awarded in 1772. John Howes exhibited regularly at the Royal Academy exhibitions from 1772 to 1793, showing 32 works in total there. The Honorary Medal presented to David Garrick Esq by the Incorporated Actors of Drury Lane Theatre painted in enamel, from a drawing by Mr Cipriani (David Garrick unveiling a herm of Shakespeare and the Ephesian Diana) was a notable work executed in 1777, marking the actor's retirement from the stage. Despite Horace Walpole's negative comments, 'very bad and unlike', the Morning Chronicle's of 28 April 1777 were much more positive about his work, 'which does Mr Howes as much credit as an enamel painter as the presenting it reflects the actors'.

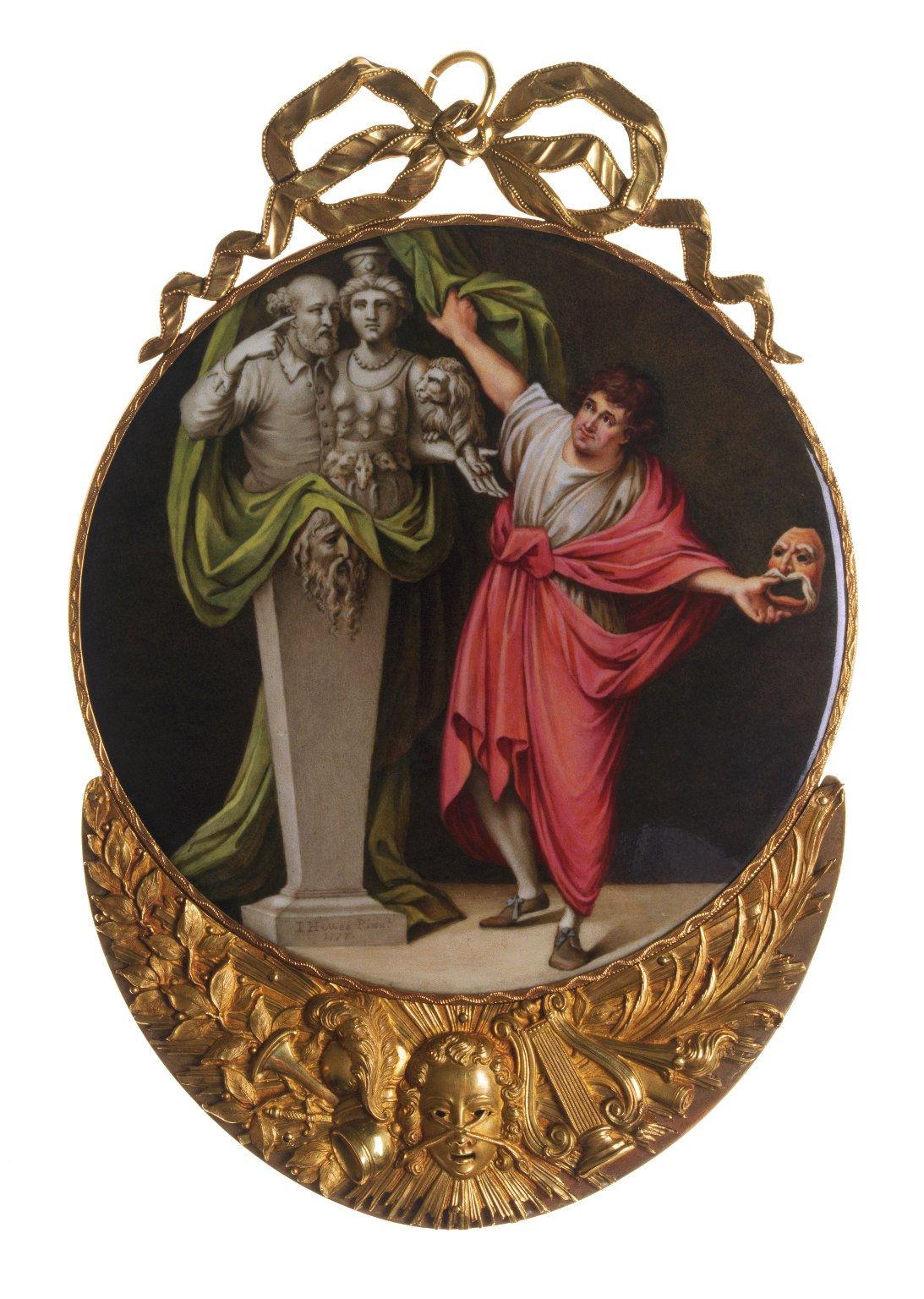
Honorary Medal presented to David Garrick Esq by the Incorporated Actors of Drury Lane Theatre painted in enamel, from a drawing by Mr Cipriani, 1777

Other enamel works still extant today are the Portrait of Lady Rushout, 1774 and Venus attended by the Graces, an oval enamel plaque, exhibited at the Royal Academy Exhibition of 1793. In 1784 John Howes won the prize of the Silver Pallett from the Royal Society of Arts for his work The Queen of Sheba visiting Solomon in the category of historical drawing. Howes painted two fine works celebrating scenes from Thomson's The Seasons. These are Palemon and Lavinia in a Landscape and Celadon and Amelia in a Landscape dating from 1795. Thomson's poem, dating from 1726-30 was hugely popular in the 18th century and editions of his work included engravings based on these subjects. Edward Penny had painted his version of Palemon and Lavinia in 1781 (Lavinia, Daughter of the Once Rich Acasto, Discovered Gleaning). Howes' works were also engraved by Bartolozzi and sold at print sales. Howes was married in 1776 to Elizabeth Mills. He continued to live at 13 Fleet Street until 1787, then in the Strand until about 1789 when he moved to Kentish Town where he lived and started a family with second wife Sarah. There is no further evidence of any art work after 1795. Later he moved to Hertfordshire, settling at Northchurch from about 1800 until his death in December 1833, his will being proved on 2 January 1834. John Howes had previously shared an inheritance with his brother-in-law of £7,000 from cousin John Mulford who died in 1814.

He was also a member of the Company of Clockmakers by patrimony and appears in its records at Fleet Street, London and Tring.
