= Queen Philippa at the Battle of Neville's Cross =

Painting by Benjamin West

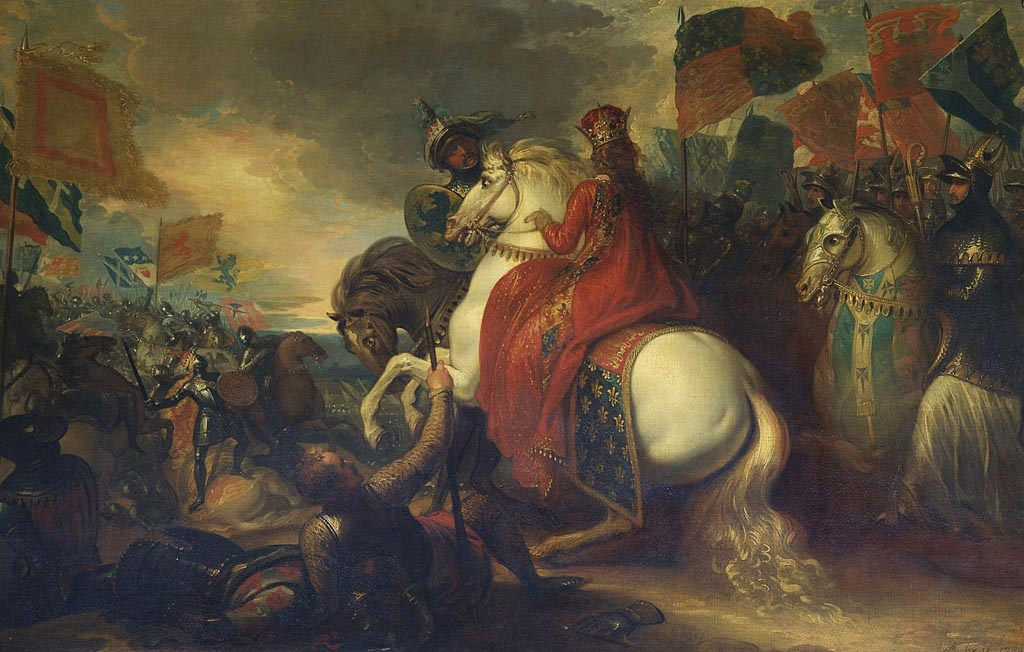
- Artist: Benjamin West
- Year: 1789
- Type: Oil on canvas, history painting
- Dimensions: 98.4 cm × 151.8 cm (38.7 in × 59.8 in)
- Location: Royal Collection, Windsor Castle

Queen Philippa at the Battle of Neville's Cross is a 1789 history painting by the Anglo-American artist Benjamin West. It depicts the 1346 Battle of Neville's Cross during the Hundred Years' War. It depicts Philippa of Hainault, queen consort of England, on horseback rallying her forces. On the left of the painting is the Scottish monarch David II fighting on foot and about to be captured.

It was one of eight paintings commissioned by George III depicting scenes from English history, seven of them relating to the reign of Edward III, to decorate the refurbished audience chamber at Windsor Castle. This painting was commissioned for 500 guineas and was exhibited at the Royal Academy's Summer Exhibition of 1793 at Somerset House.

== Bibliography ==
- Corbett, David Peters (ed.). A Companion to British Art: 1600 to the Present. John Wiley & Sons, 2016.
- Evans. Benjamin West and the Taste of His Times. Southern Illinois University Press, 1959.
- Harrington, Peter. British Artists and War: The Face of Battle in Paintings and Prints, 1700-1914. Greenhill Books, 1993.
