= Edward III with the Black Prince after the Battle of Crécy =

Painting by Benjamin West

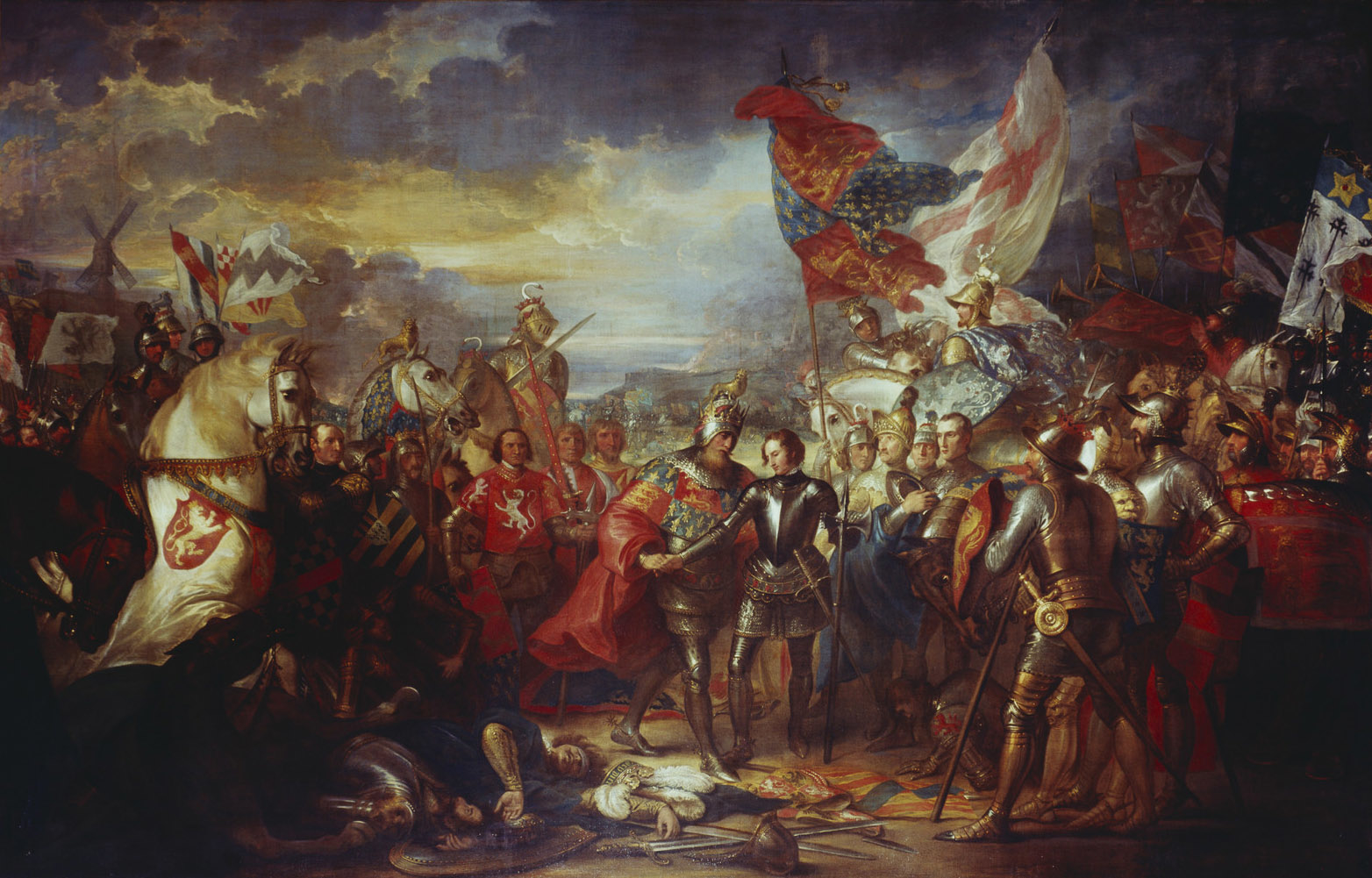
- Artist: Benjamin West
- Year: 1788
- Type: Oil on canvas, history painting
- Dimensions: 290 cm × 448 cm (110 in × 176 in)
- Location: Royal Collection

Edward III with the Black Prince after the Battle of Crécy is a 1788 history painting by the Anglo-American artist Benjamin West. Large in scale, it depicts Edward III greeting his son Edward the Black Prince in the aftermath of the English victory over France at the Battle of Crécy in 1346 during the Hundred Years War. West was a Pennsylvanian painter who settled in Britain and enjoyed the patronage of George III. In 1792 he became President of the Royal Academy in succession to Joshua Reynolds.

West received a large commission to produce a series of eight paintings for the King's Audience Chamber at Windsor Castle depicting scenes from the life of Edward III. The painting was displayed at the Royal Academy Exhibition of 1793 at Somerset House in London. It remains in the Royal Collection.

== Bibliography ==
- Abrams, Ann Uhry. The Valiant Hero: Benjamin West and Grand-style History Painting. Smithsonian Institution Press, 1985.
- Corbett, David Peters (ed.). A Companion to British Art: 1600 to the Present. John Wiley & Sons, 2016.
- Harrington, Peter. British Artists and War: The Face of Battle in Paintings and Prints, 1700-1914. Greenhill Books, 1993.
