= The Rising Squall, Hot Wells =

Painting by J. M. W. Turner

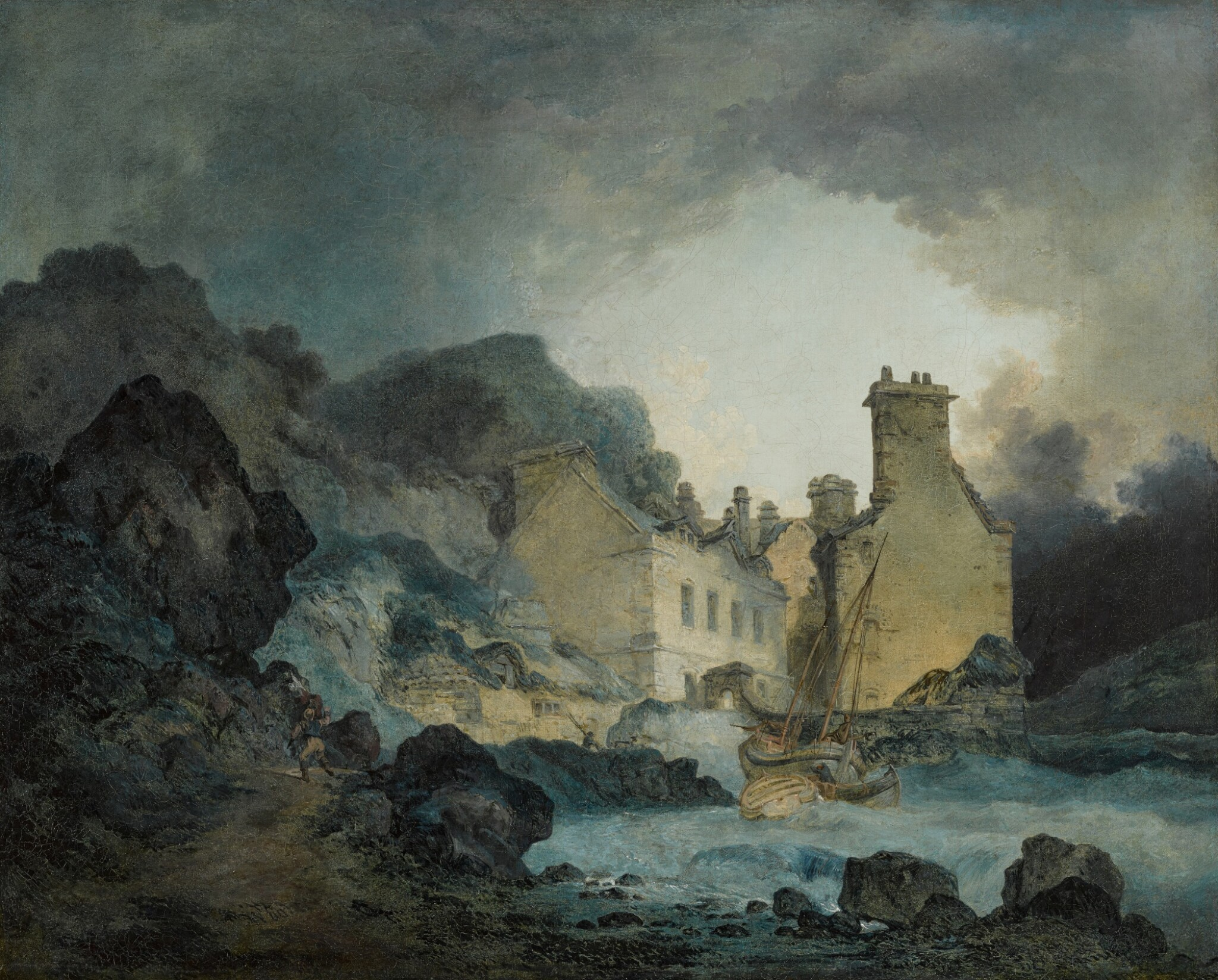
- Artist: J.M.W. Turner
- Year: 1792
- Type: Oil on canvas, landscape painting
- Dimensions: 59.8 cm × 74 cm (23.5 in × 29 in)
- Location: Private collection

The Rising Squall, Hot Wells, from St Vincent's Rock, Bristol is a 1792 landscape painting by the British artist J.M.W. Turner. It depicts a stormy day on the River Avon looking across towards Hotwells, a suburb of Bristol, several decades before the Clifton Suspension Bridge was built to the north. It was produced when the artist was seventeen years old. The painting was considered lost for many years and had also been miscategorised as a watercolour. In 2024, when it came up for sale, it was purchased for £500 by a buyer who suspected it might be by Philip James de Loutherbourg, a successful French-born painter whose style Turner imitated in his early years. Cleaning revealed the signature of Turner.

The work was displayed at the Royal Academy Exhibition of 1793 at Somerset House in London, making it the first known Turner oil painting to be exhibited. Previously his 1796 painting Fishermen at Sea had been considered his first exhibited oil painting. The painting was auctioned at Sotheby's in July 2025. An attempt by the Bristol Museum and Art Gallery to purchase it was unsuccessful and it was bought for £1.9 million by a British private collector, several times the expected price. It featured at the 2025 exhibition Turner and Constable: Rivals and Originals held at the Tate Britain.

== See also ==
- List of paintings by J. M. W. Turner

== Bibliography ==
- Bailey, Anthony. J.M.W. Turner: Standing in the Sun. Tate Enterprises Ltd, 2013.
- Concannon, Amy (ed.) Turner and Constable: Rivals and Originals. Tate Publishing, 2025
- Hamilton, James. Turner's Britain. Merrell, 2003.
- Moyle, Franny. Turner: The Extraordinary Life and Momentous Times of J. M. W. Turner. Penguin Books, 2016.
- Reynolds, Graham. Turner. Thames & Hudson, 2022.
