= Sir Francis Ford's Children Giving a Coin to a Beggar Boy =

Painting by William Beechey

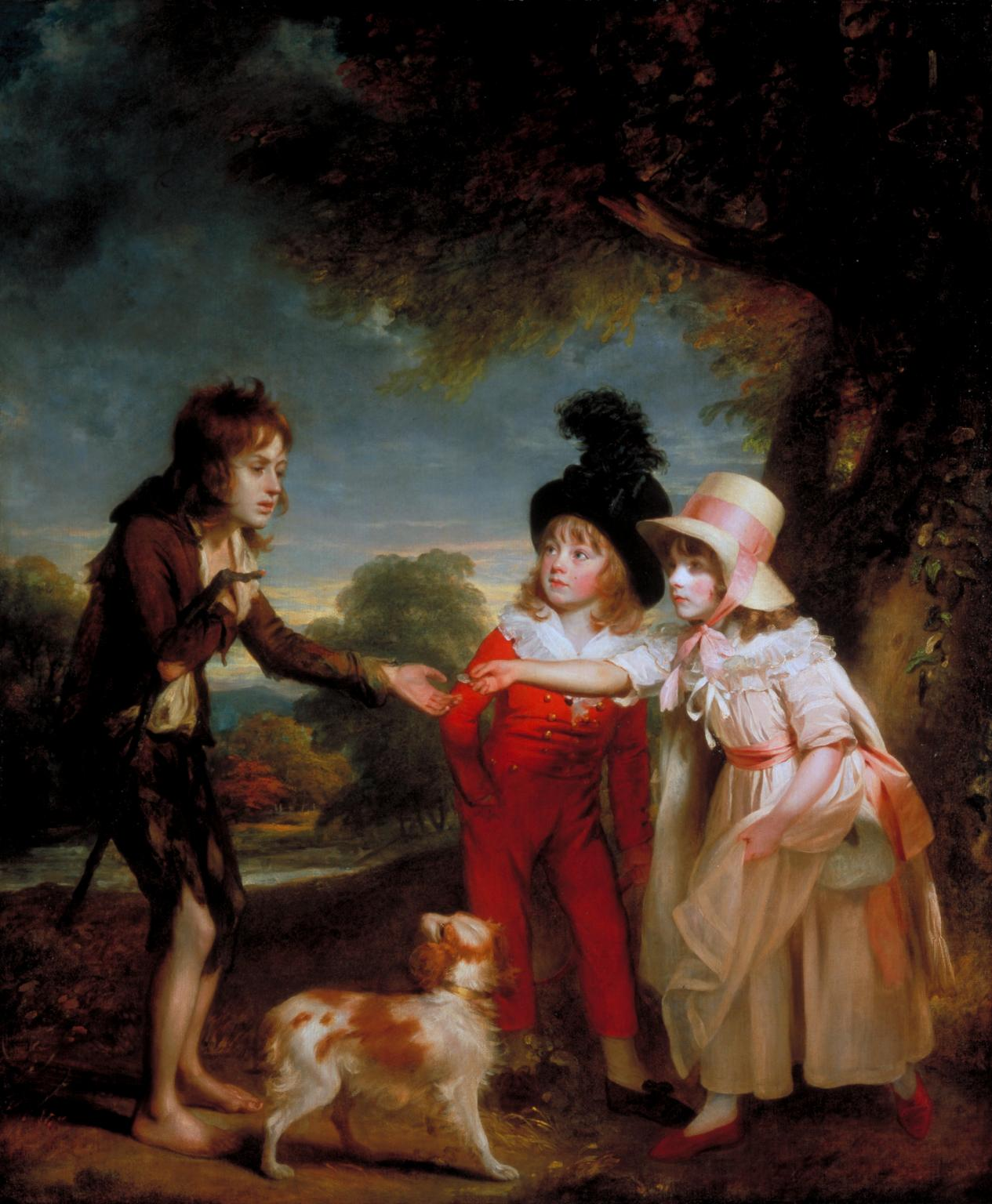
- Artist: William Beechey
- Year: 1793
- Type: Oil on canvas, portrait
- Dimensions: 180 cm × 150 cm (71 in × 59 in)
- Location: Tate Britain, London

Sir Francis Ford's Children Giving a Coin to a Beggar Boy is a 1793 portrait painting by the British artist William Beechey. It shows two well-dressed children of Sir Francis Ford passing a coin to a beggar. Ford was a wealthy owner of plantations in the West Indies and it has been suggested that the image may have reinforced an argument that the poor of Britain were less cared for-than the slaves in the Caribbean. This came at a time when abolitionist sentiment was growing amongst the British public.

Beechey was a noted portraitist and member of the Royal Academy of Arts. The painting was displayed at the Academy's Summer Exhibition of 1793 at Somerset House.It is in the collection of Tate Britain in London, having been acquired in 1993.

== Bibliography ==
- Grint, Keith. A Cartography of Resistance: Leadership, Management, and Command. Oxford University Press, 2024.
- Morrison, Tessa. Unbuilt Utopian Cities 1460 to 1900: Reconstructing their Architecture and Political Philosophy. Routledge,2016.
