= Buttermere Lake (painting) =

Painting by Joseph Mallord William Turner

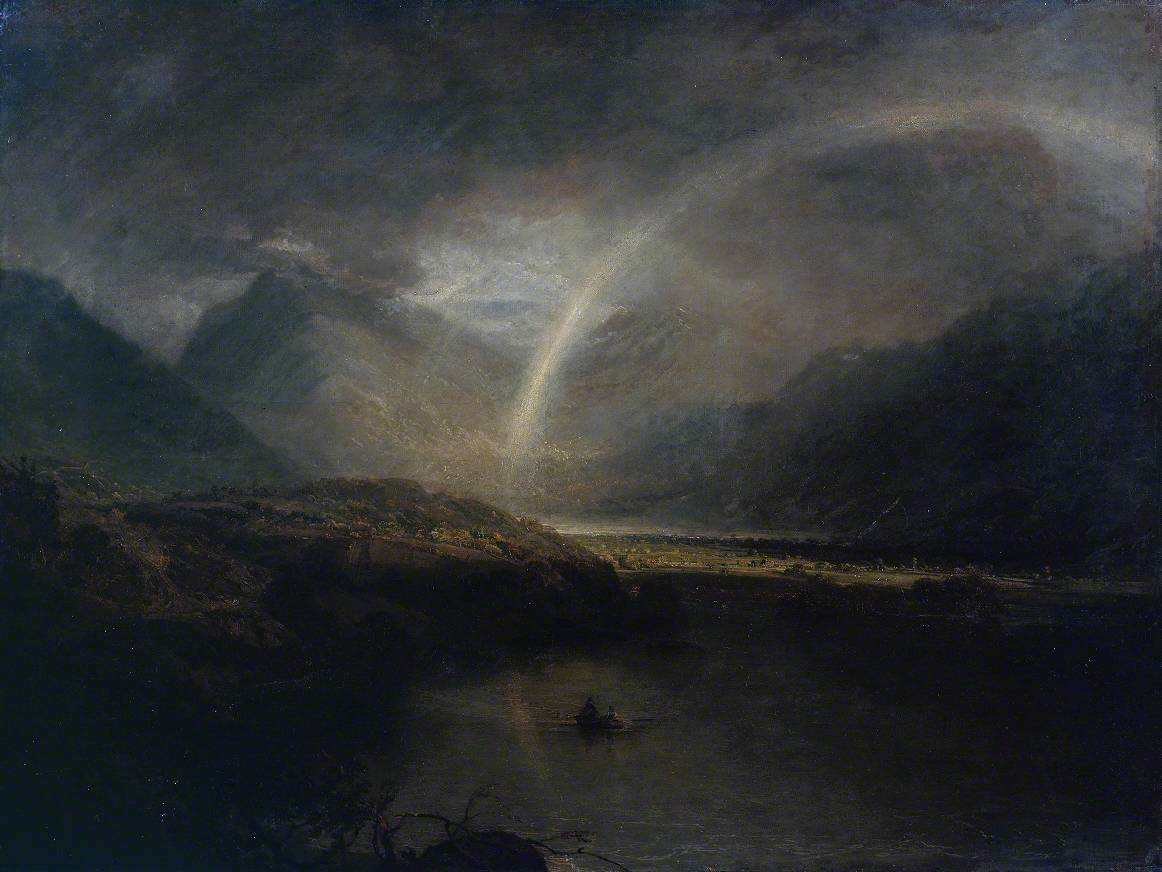
- Artist: J. M. W. Turner
- Dimensions: 88.9 cm × 119.4 cm (35.0 in × 47.0 in)
- Location: Tate
- Accession: N00460
- Website: tate.org.uk/...n00460

Buttermere Lake is a 1798 landscape painting by J. M. W. Turner. It features a view of Buttermere in Cumberland. Turner had visited the Lake District the previous year and this painting was based on his studies of the area.

The painting was displayed at the Royal Academy Exhibition of 1798 at Somerset House. It is also known by the longer title Buttermere Lake, with Part of Cromackwater, Cumberland, a Shower. Today the painting is in the collection of the Tate Britain, having been part of the Turner Bequest of 1851. It featured at the Turner and Constable: Rivals and Originals exhibition at the Tate in 2025-26.

== See also ==
- List of paintings by J. M. W. Turner

== Bibliography ==
- Concannon, Amy (ed.) Turner and Constable: Rivals and Originals. Tate Publishing, 2025.
