= Turner and Constable: Rivals and Originals =

Art exhibition in London

Exhibition poster

Turner and Constable: Rivals and Originals was an art exhibition which took place at the Tate Britain in London from 27 November 2025 to 12 April 2026.

It commemorated the 250th anniversary of the birth of the two artists (J. M. W. Turner was born in London in 1775 and John Constable in Suffolk in 1776) known as the foremost British landscape artists of the Romantic era. It charts the two artists throughout their lives and careers, including the noted rivalry during the 1830s which notably flared up at the Royal Academy Exhibition of 1832 at Somerset House. It also features the recently rediscovered Turner painting The Rising Squall, Hot Wells, produced when he was aged seventeen.

It featured a number of loans from private collections and galleries in the United States including Constable's The White Horse from the Frick Collection and Turner's The Burning of the Houses of Lords and Commons from the Cleveland Museum of Art.

The exhibition received positive reviews in The Guardian, The Evening Standard and The Financial Times .

== Gallery ==
=== Constable ===
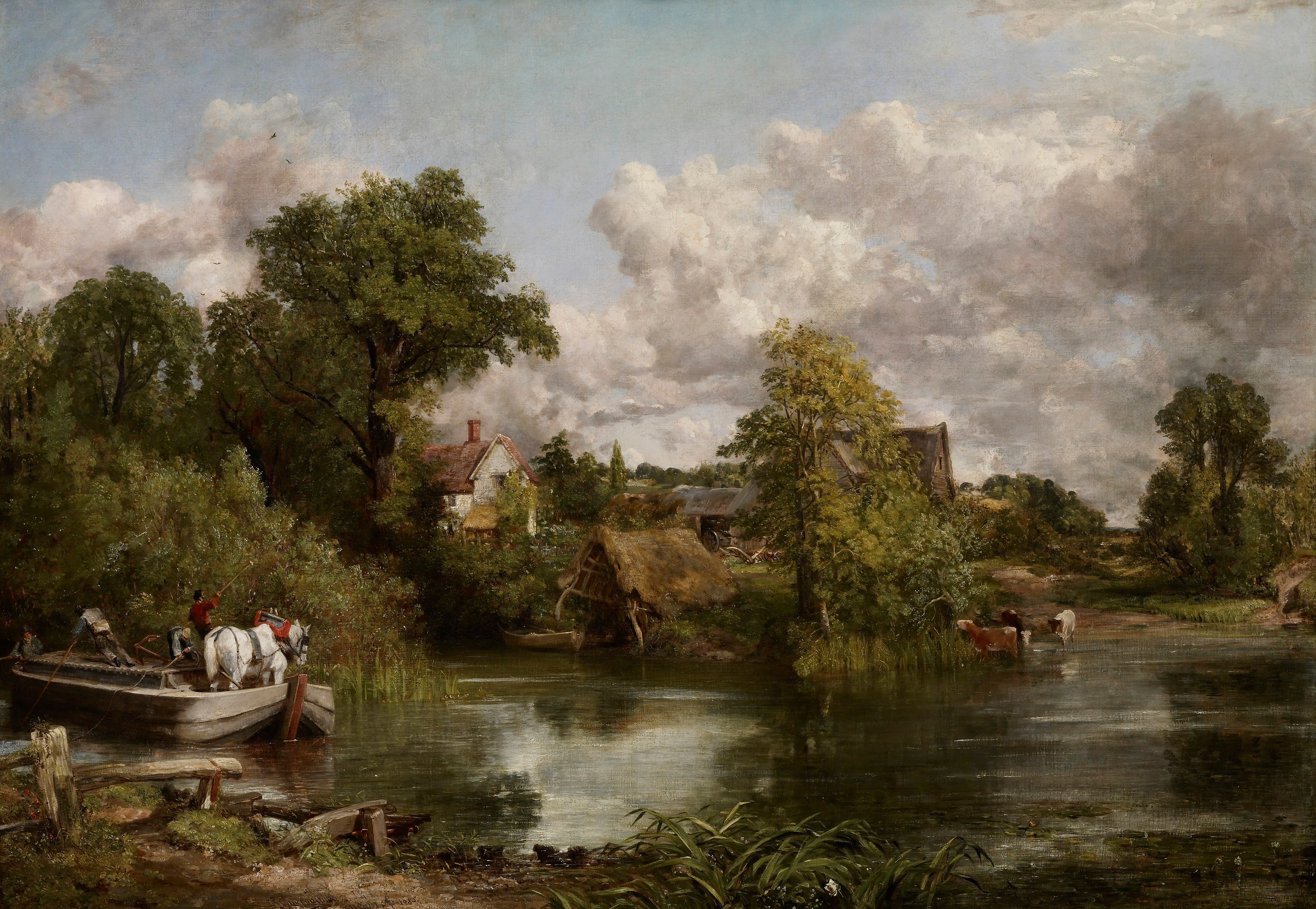
The White Horse, 1819

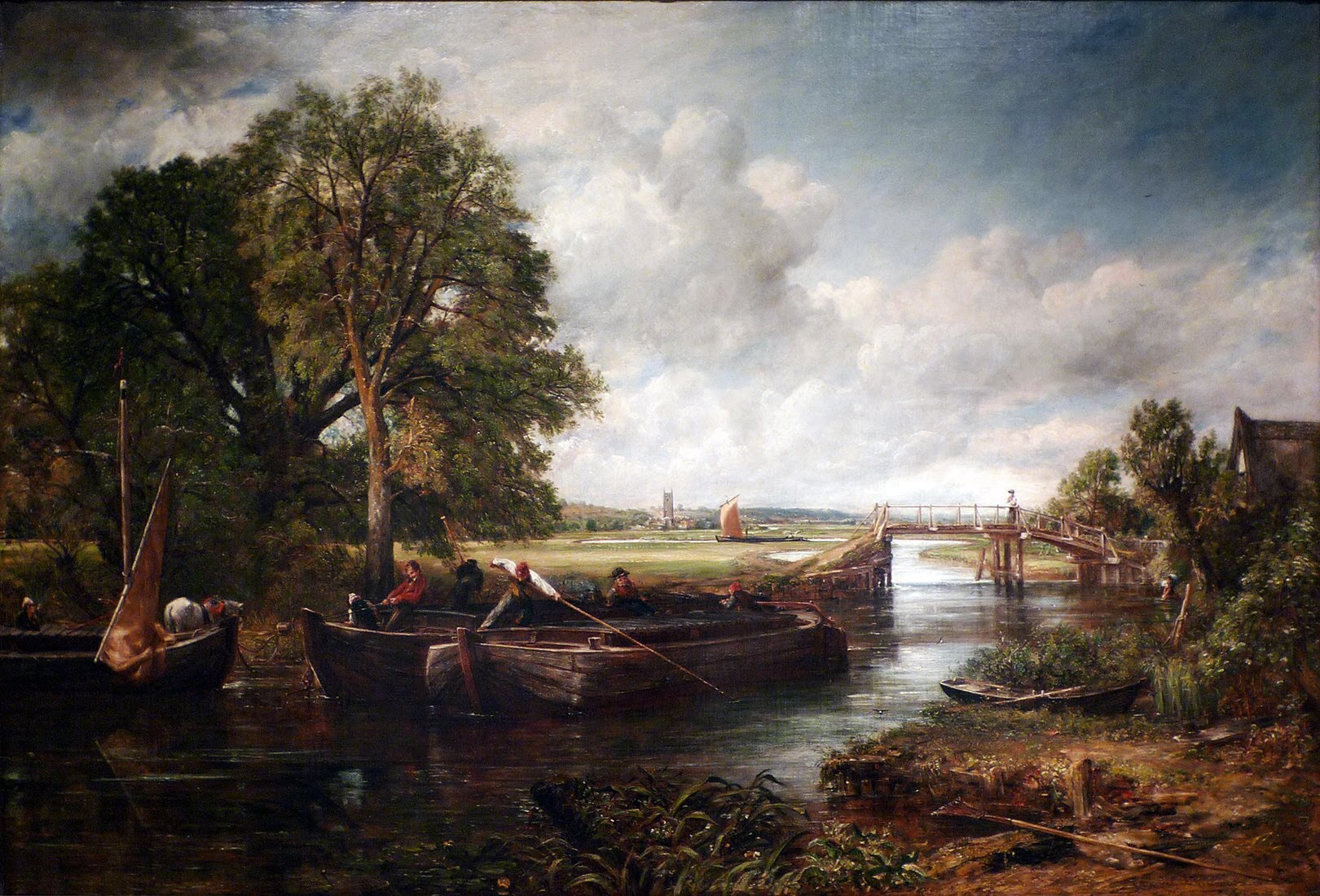
View on the Stour near Dedham, 1822

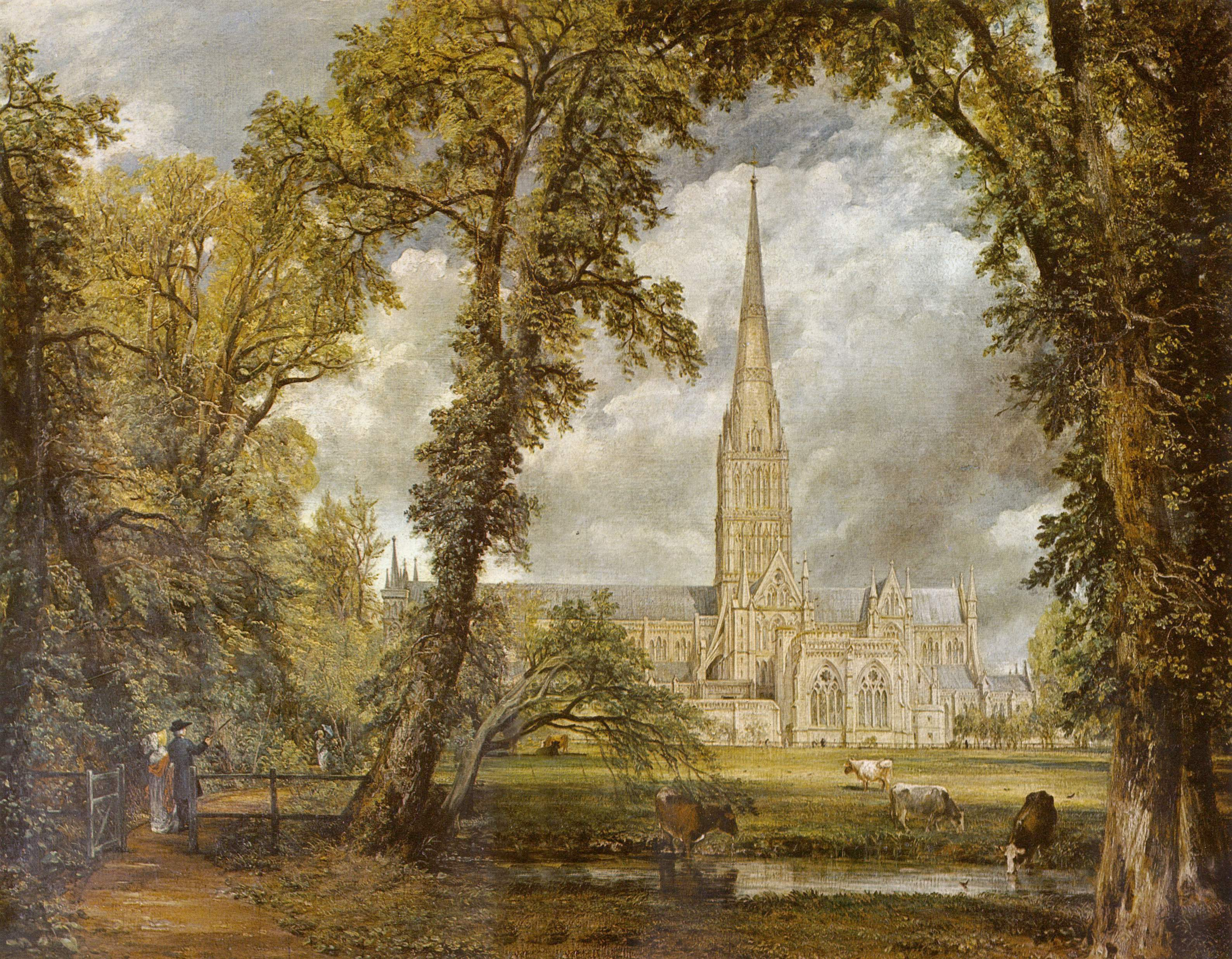
Salisbury Cathedral from the Bishop's Grounds, 1823

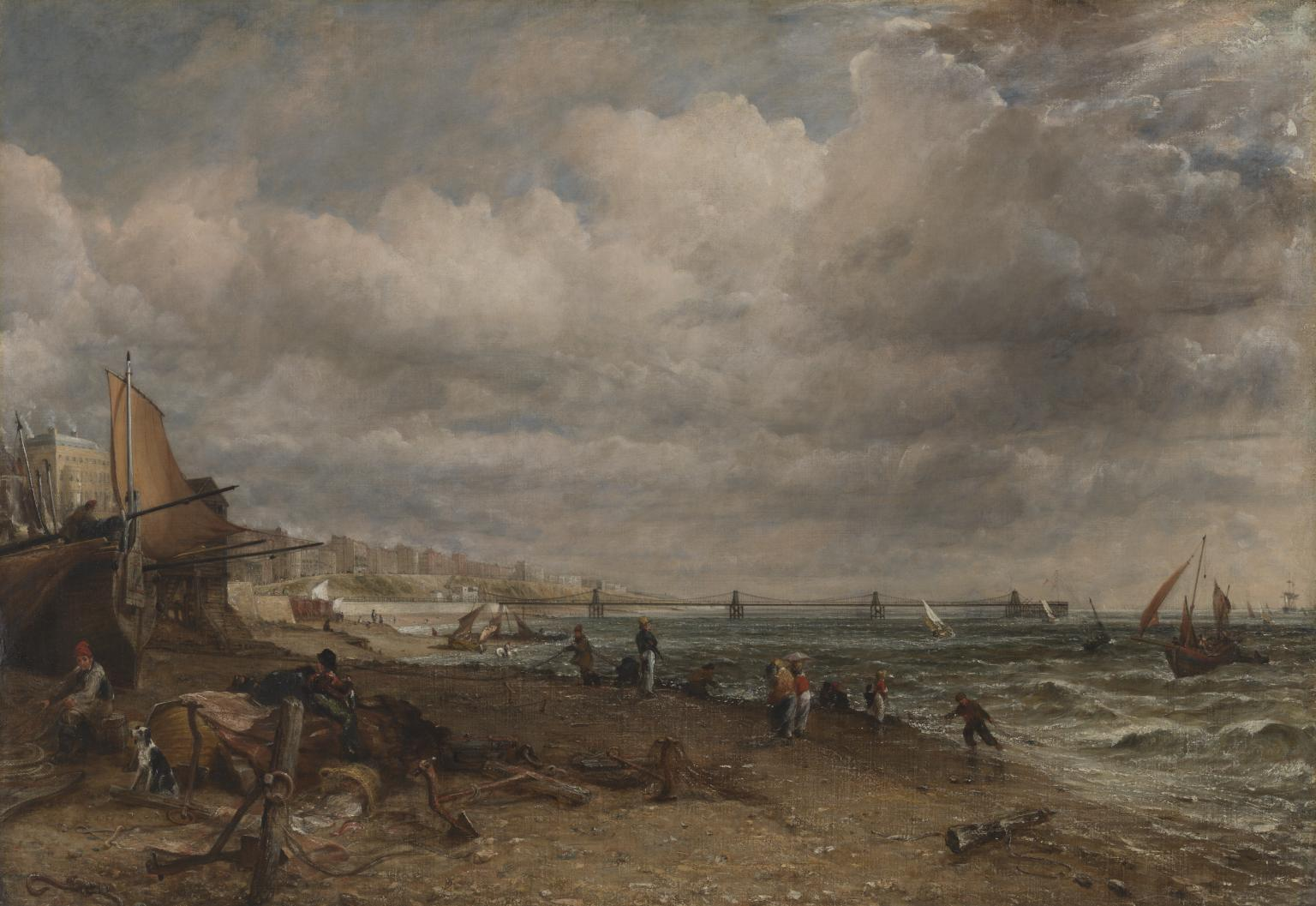
Chain Pier, Brighton, 1827

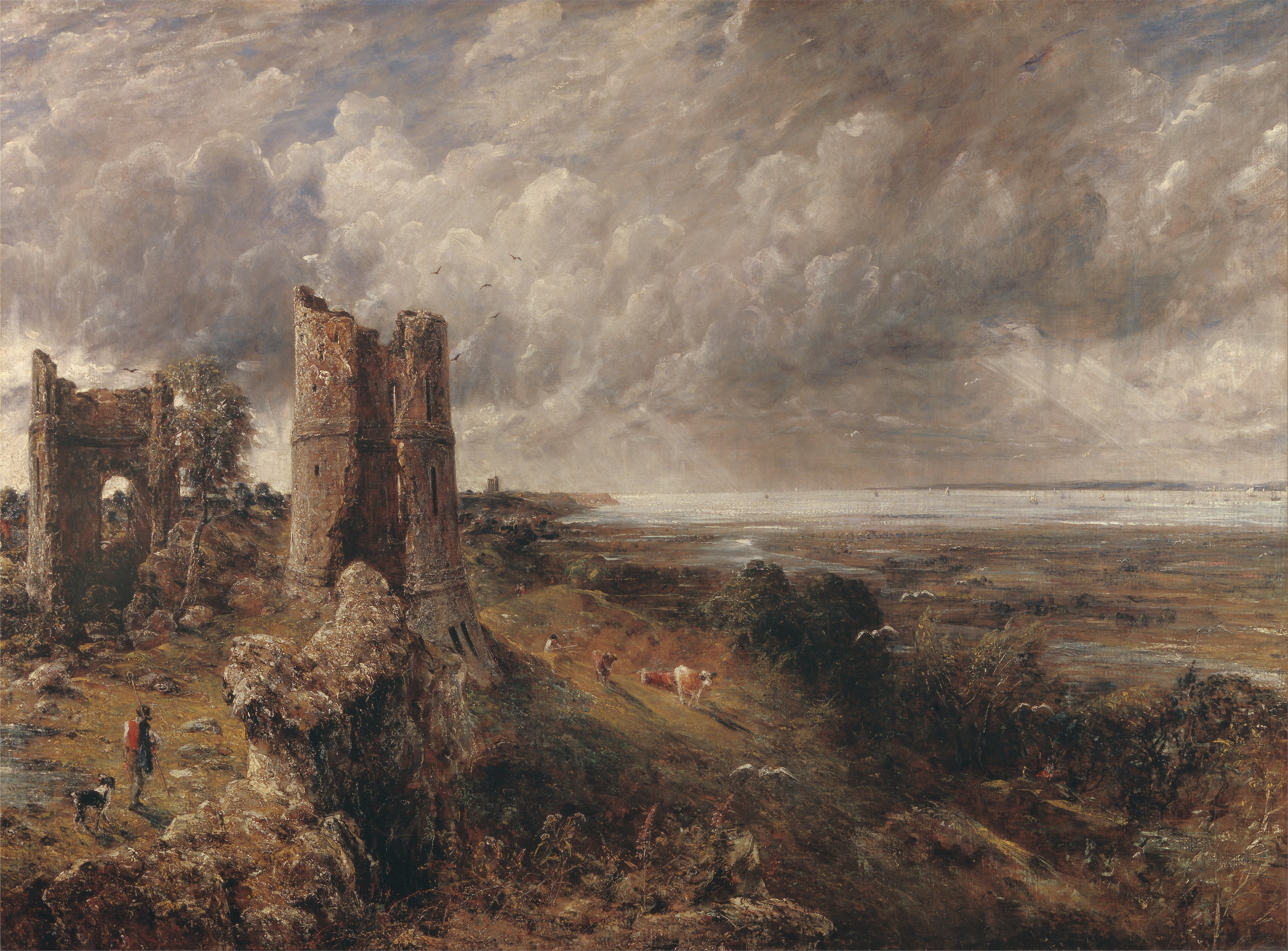
Hadleigh Castle, 1829

=== Turner ===
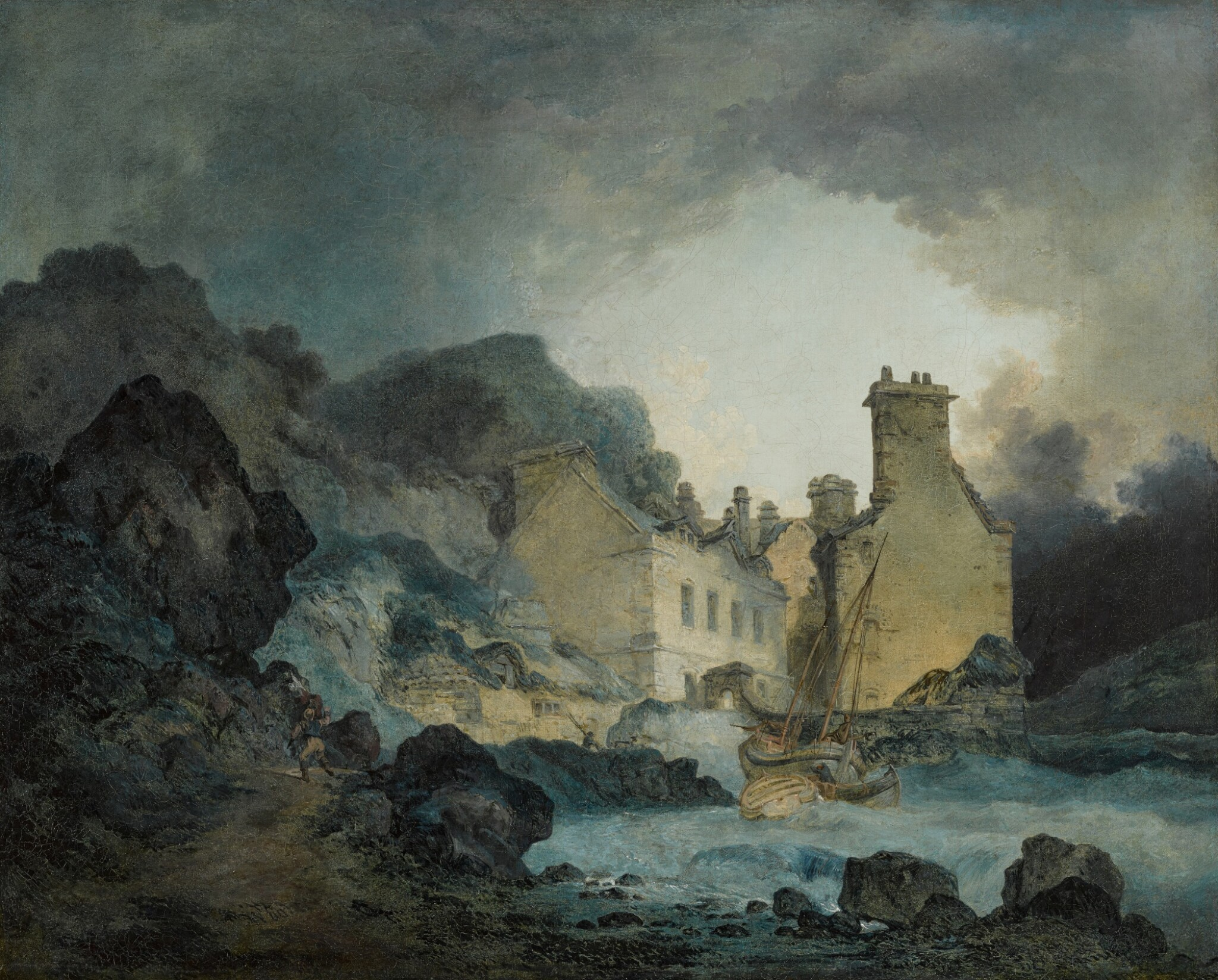
The Rising Squall, Hot Wells, 1792

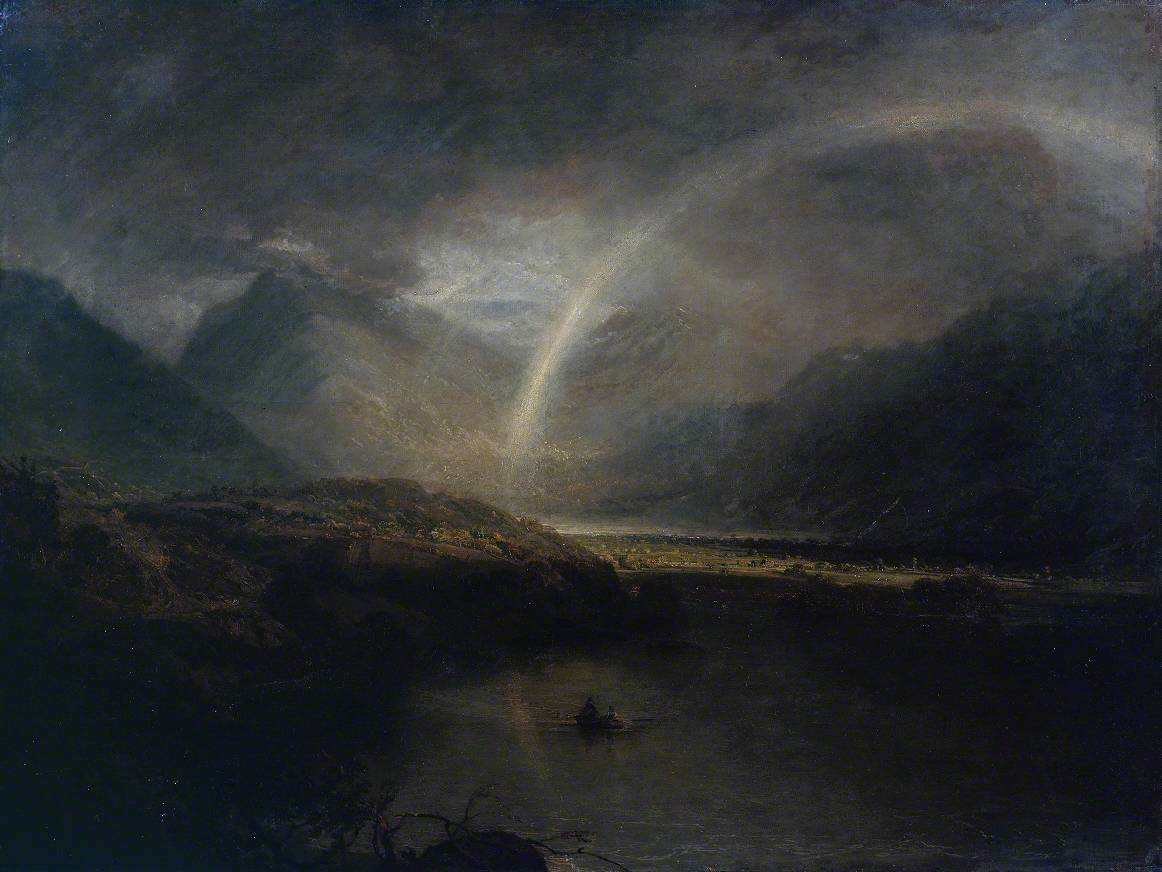
Buttermere Lake, 1798

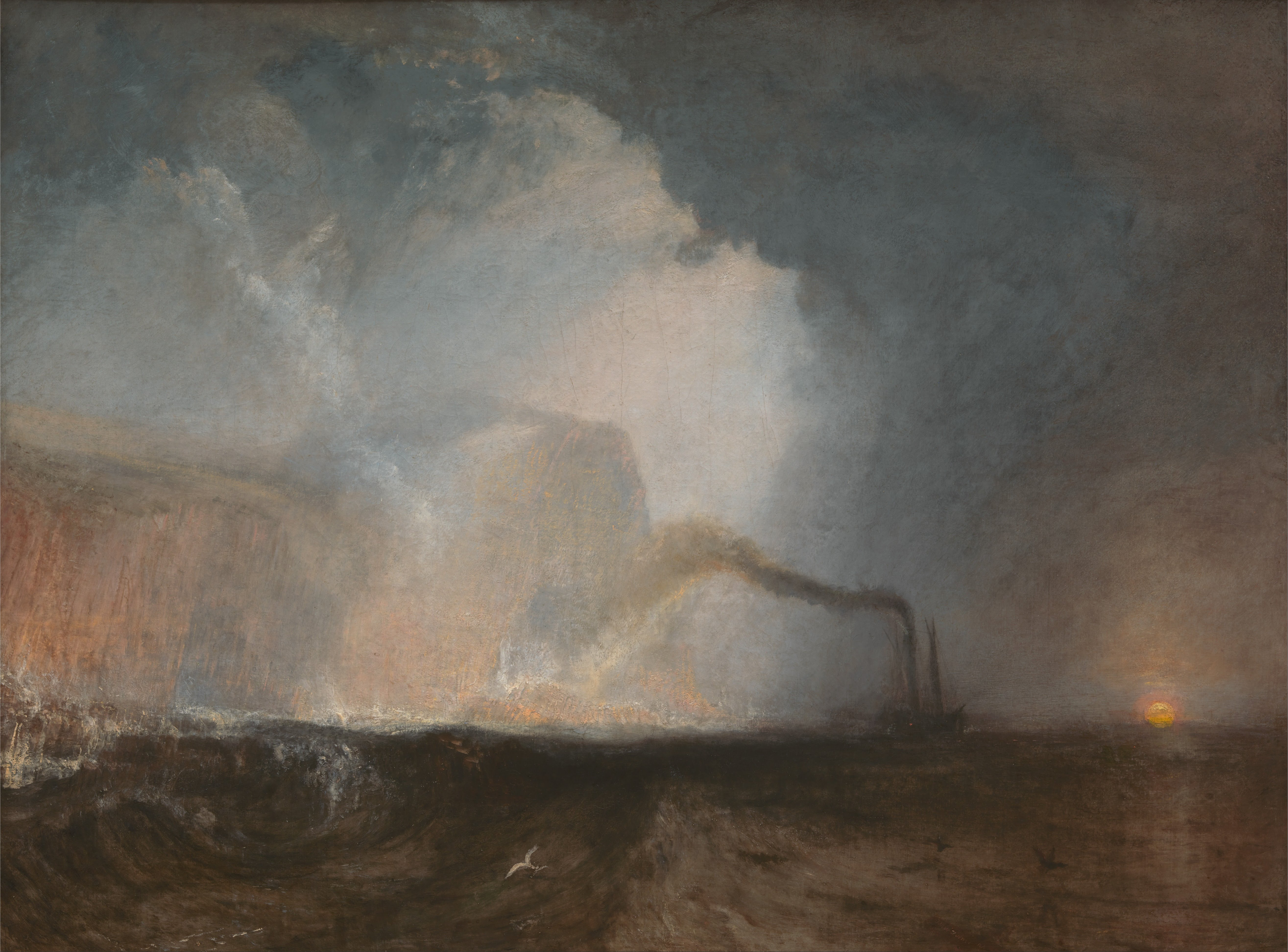
Staffa, Fingal's Cave, 1832

The Burning of the Houses of Lords and Commons, 1835

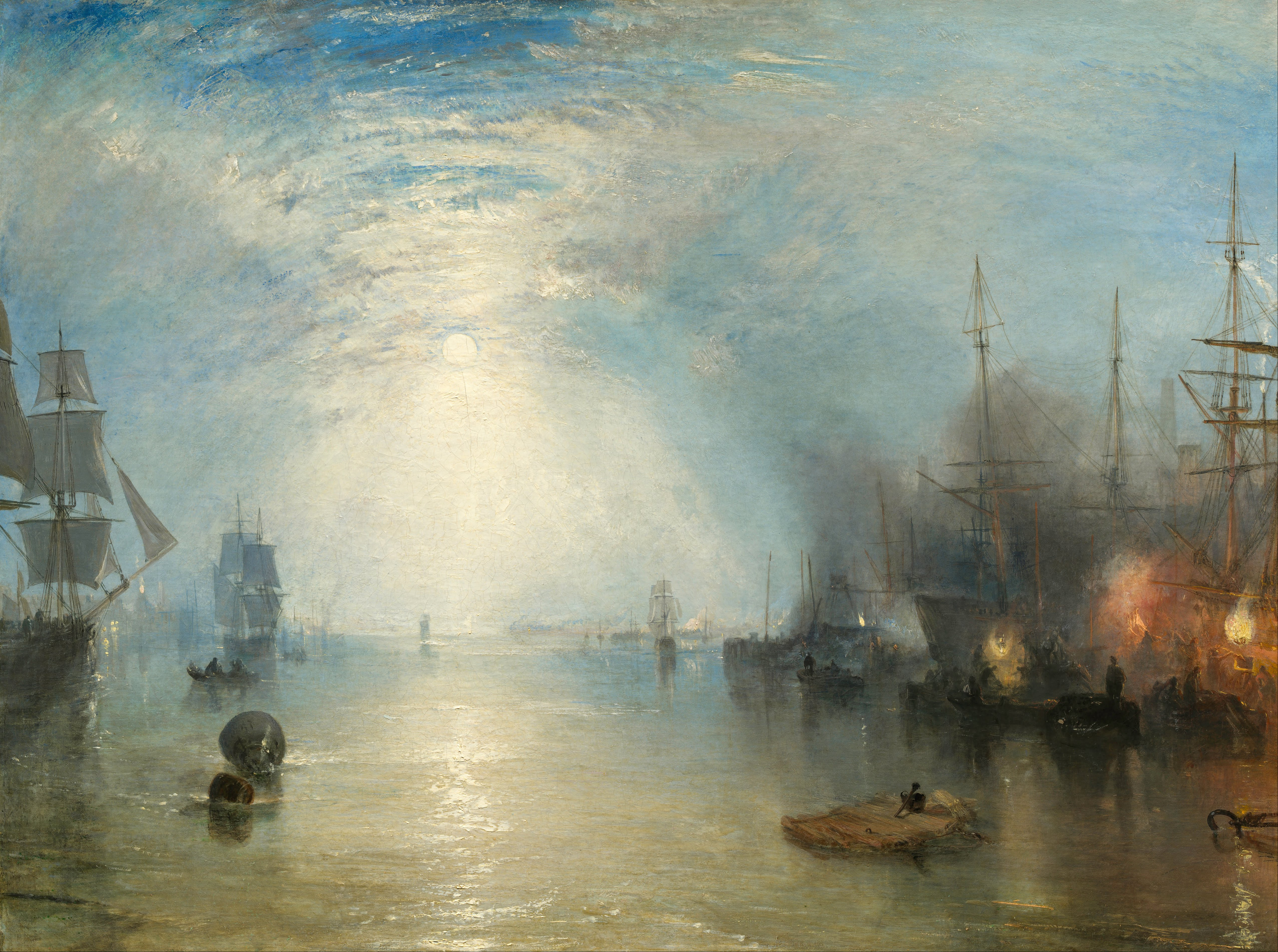
Keelmen Heaving in Coals by Moonlight, 1835

== Bibliography ==
- Concannon, Amy (ed.) Turner and Constable: Rivals and Originals. Tate Publishing, 2025
