= Royal Academy Exhibition of 1793 =

1793 art exhibition in London

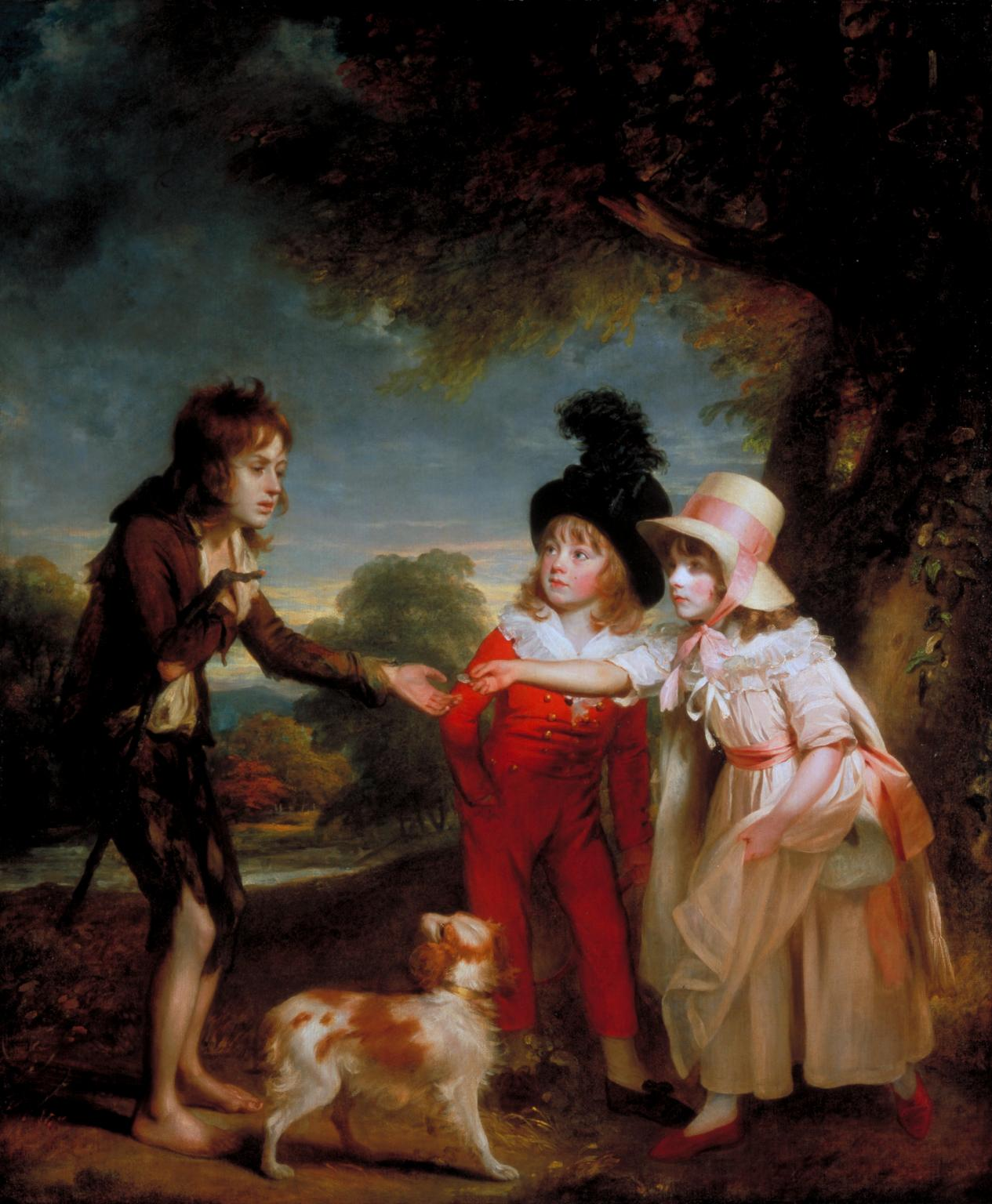
Sir Francis Ford's Children Giving a Coin to a Beggar Boy by William Beechey

The Royal Academy Exhibition of 1793 was the twenty fifth annual Summer Exhibition of the British Royal Academy of Arts. Staged at Somerset House In London between 29 April and 8 June 1793, it was the first to be held since Britain had entered the French Revolutionary Wars following the French Republic's declaration of war.

The President of the Royal Academy Benjamin West submitted the history paintings Edward III with the Black Prince after the Battle of Crecy and Queen Philippa at the Battle of Neville's Cross commissionedby George III for Windsor Castle, as well as the religious work Paul and Barnabas at Lystra. His fellow American John Singleton Copley sent in a work The Red Cross Knight to the Academy for the first time in seven years.

Thomas Lawrence, a rising artist who had made his name with polished portraits attempted to move into history painting with Prospero Raising the Storm, but he was disappointed by the critical reaction and later painted it over. Meanwhile the 17 year old J.M.W. Turner displayed an oil painting The Rising Squall, a view of the River Avon near Bristol. The painting, for many years mis-categorised as a watercolour and considered lost, was rediscovered and auctioned in 2025 as Turner's earliest exhibited oil painting.

William Beechey's Sir Francis Ford's Children Giving a Coin to a Beggar Boy, combining portrait and genre painting, as one of the major hits of the exhibition. Francis Wheatley exhibited several of his The Cries of London series, featuring scenes of everyday city life.

== Gallery ==
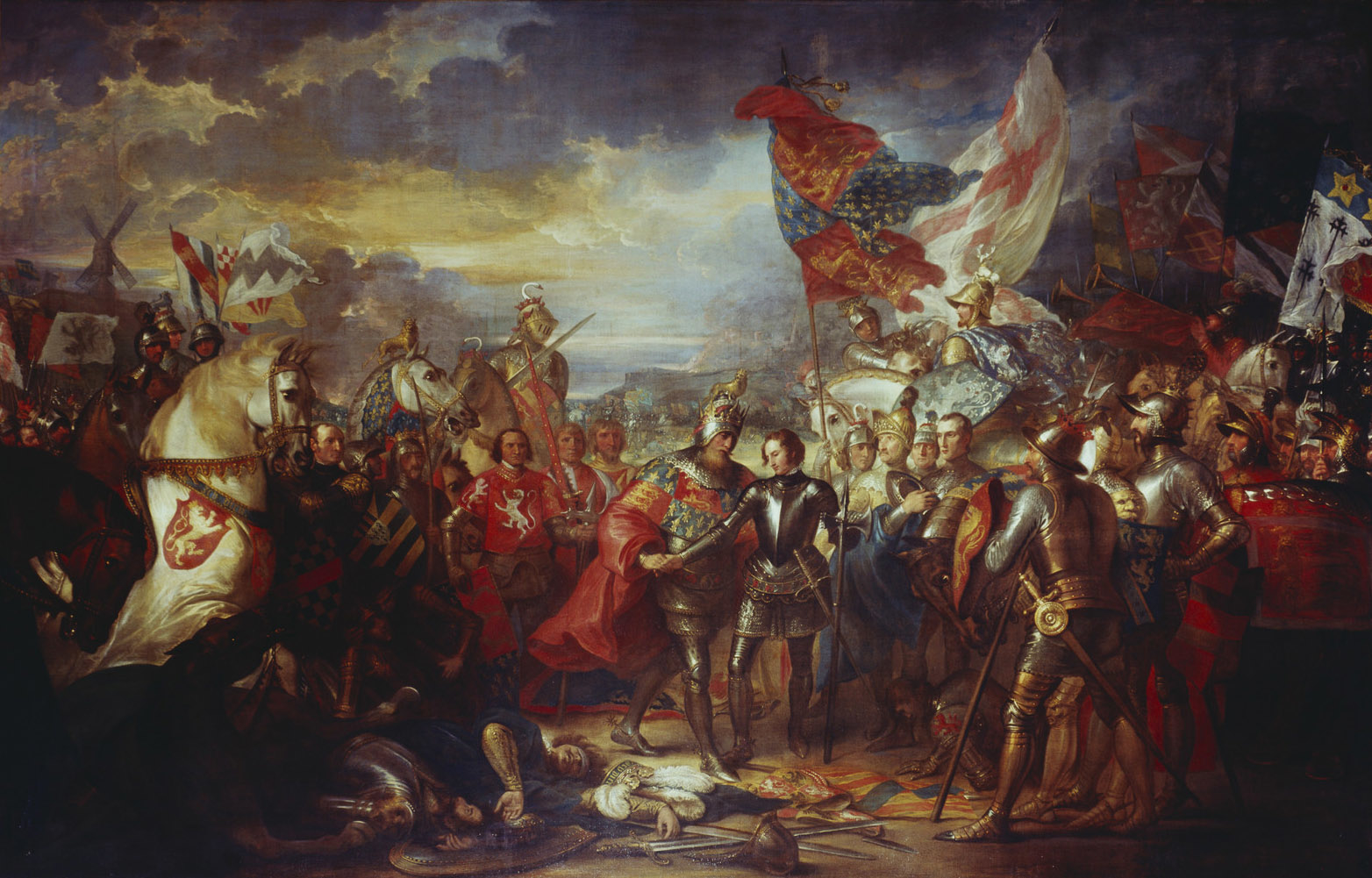
Edward III with the Black Prince after the Battle of Crécy by Benjamin West

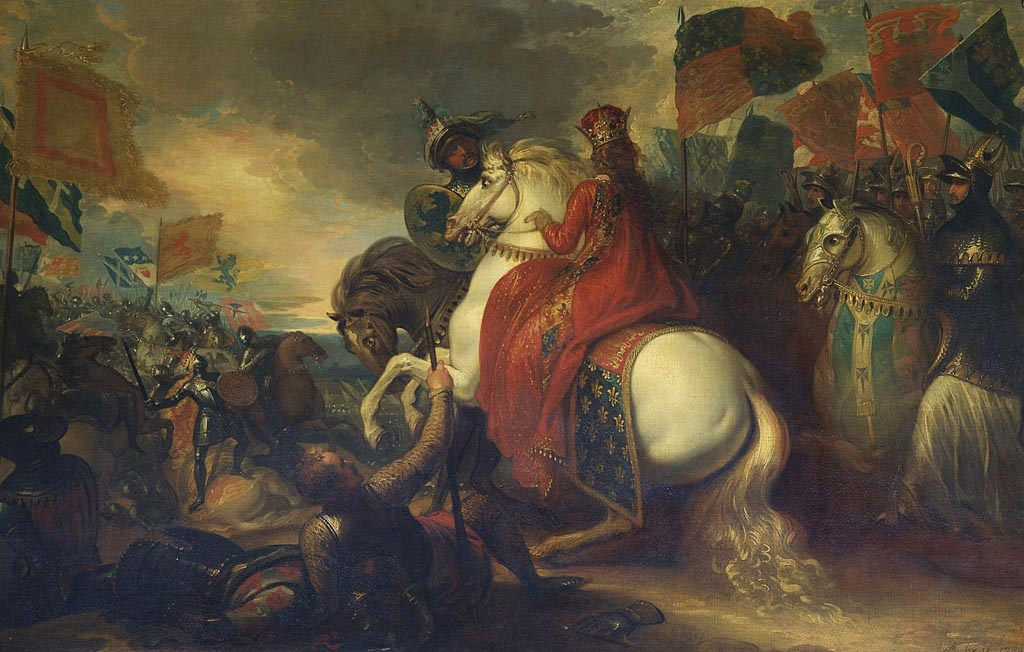
Queen Philippa at the Battle of Neville's Cross by Benjamin West

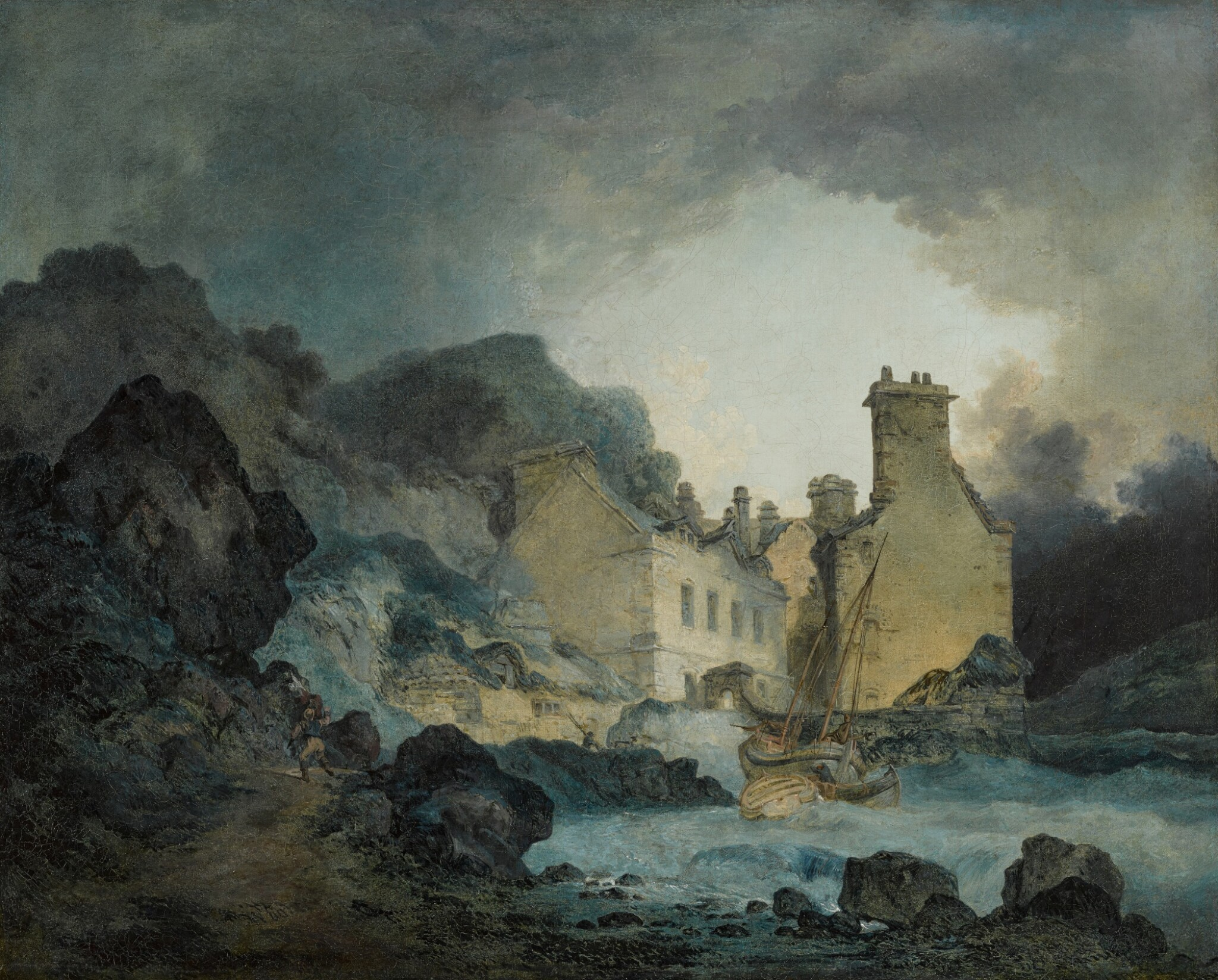
The Rising Squall, Hot Wells by J.M.W. Turner

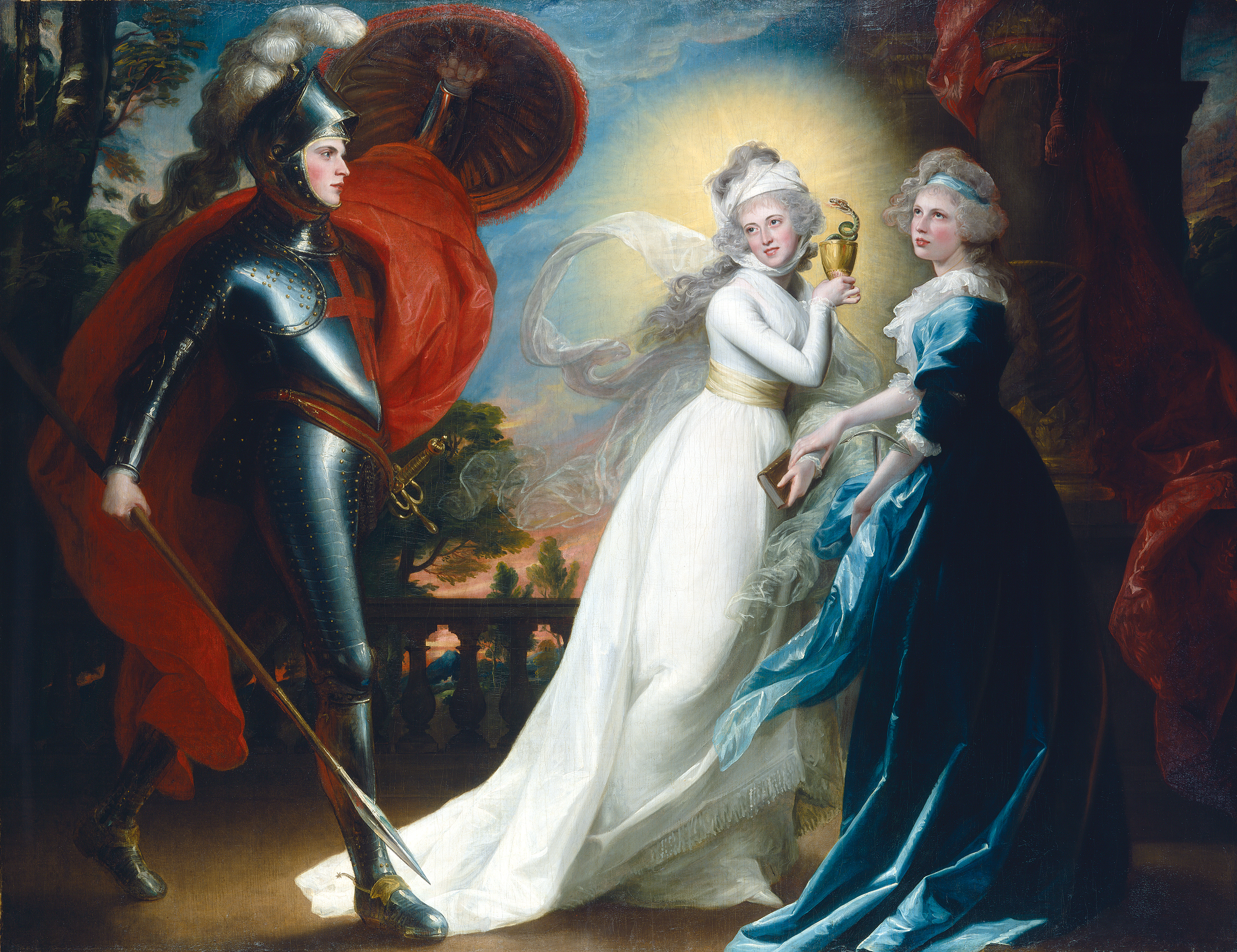
The Red Cross Knight by John Singleton Copley

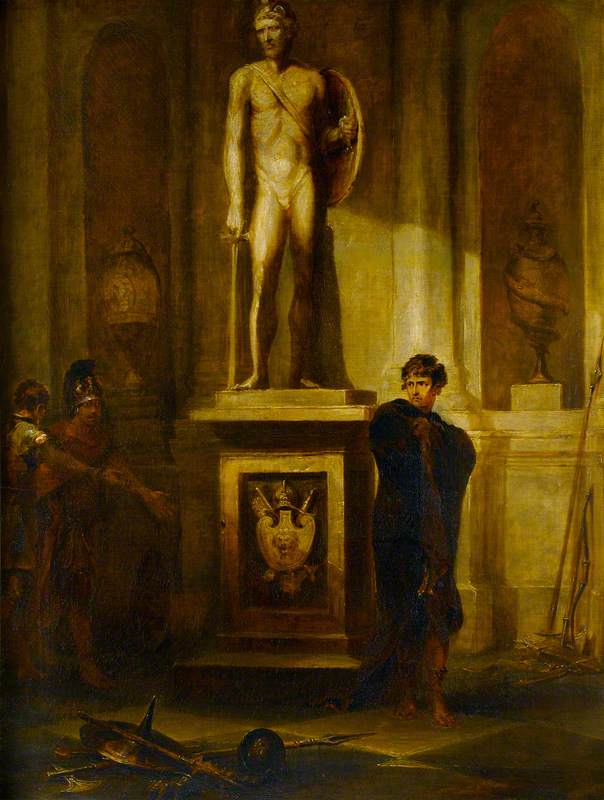
John Philip Kemble in Coriolanus by Francis Bourgeois

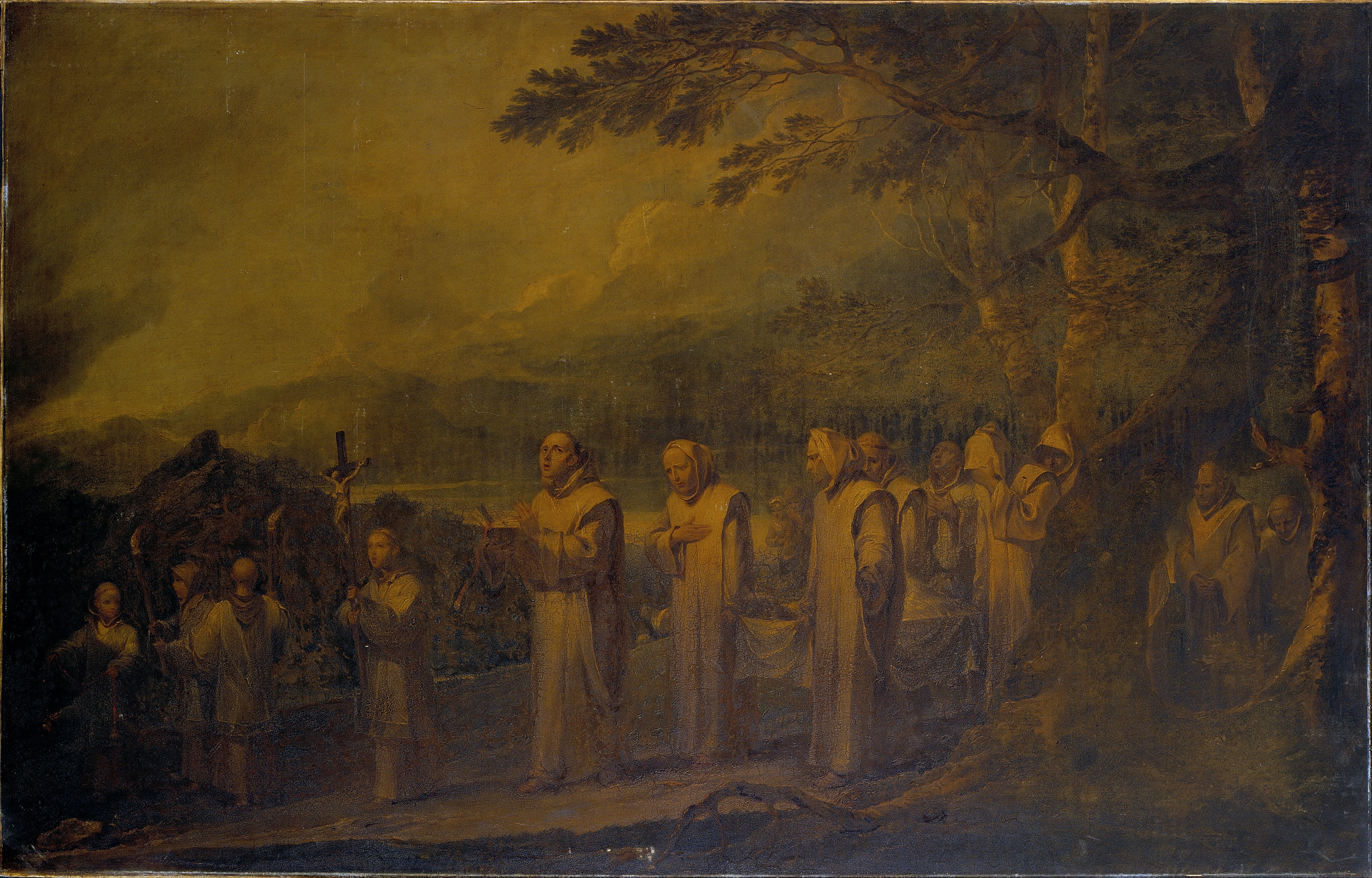
Funeral Procession of a White Friar by Francis Bourgeois

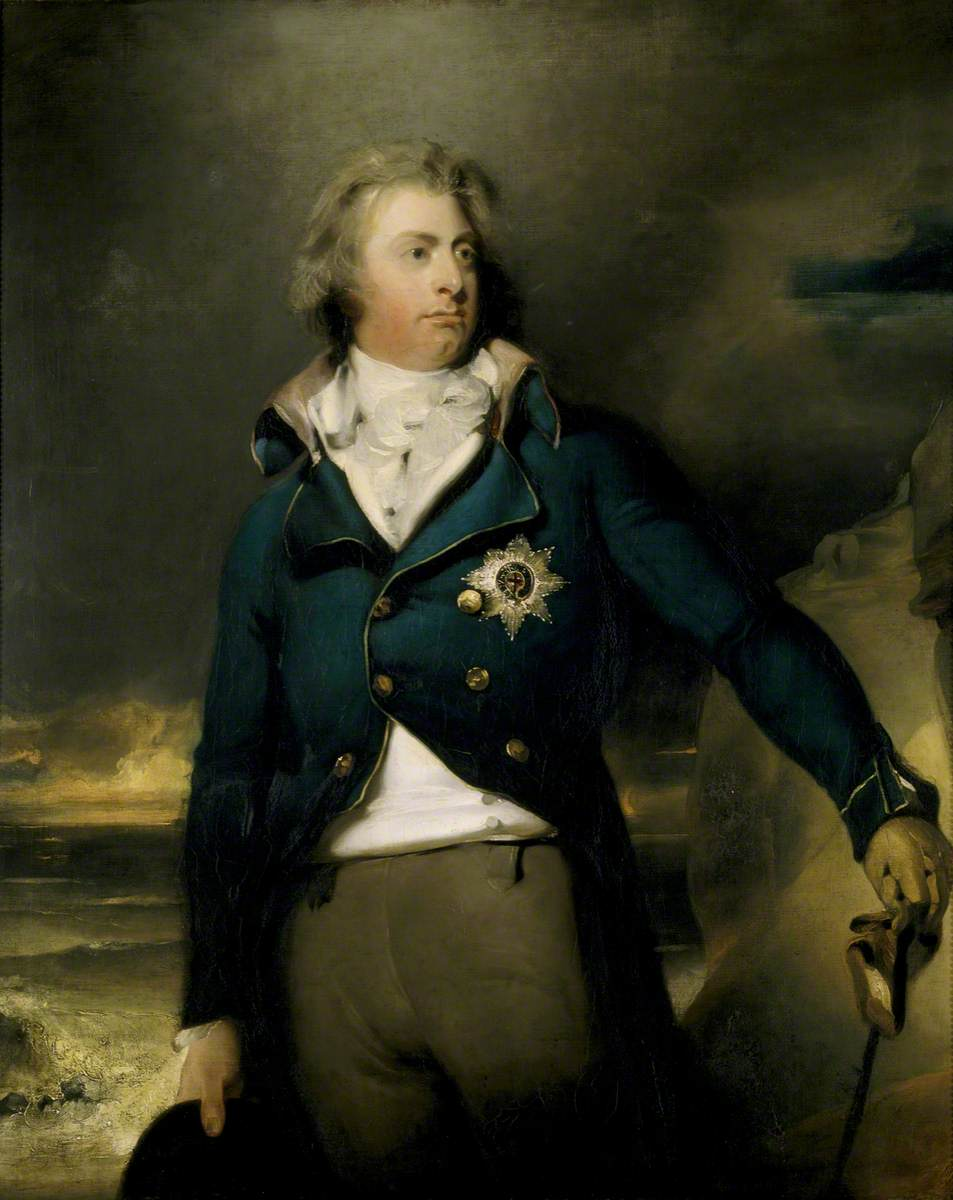
Portrait of the Duke of Clarence by Thomas Lawrence

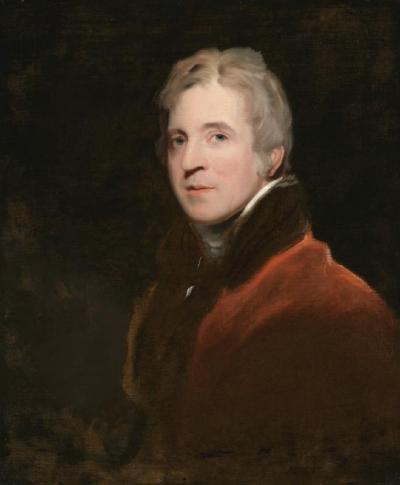
Portrait of Sir George Beaumont by Thomas Lawrence

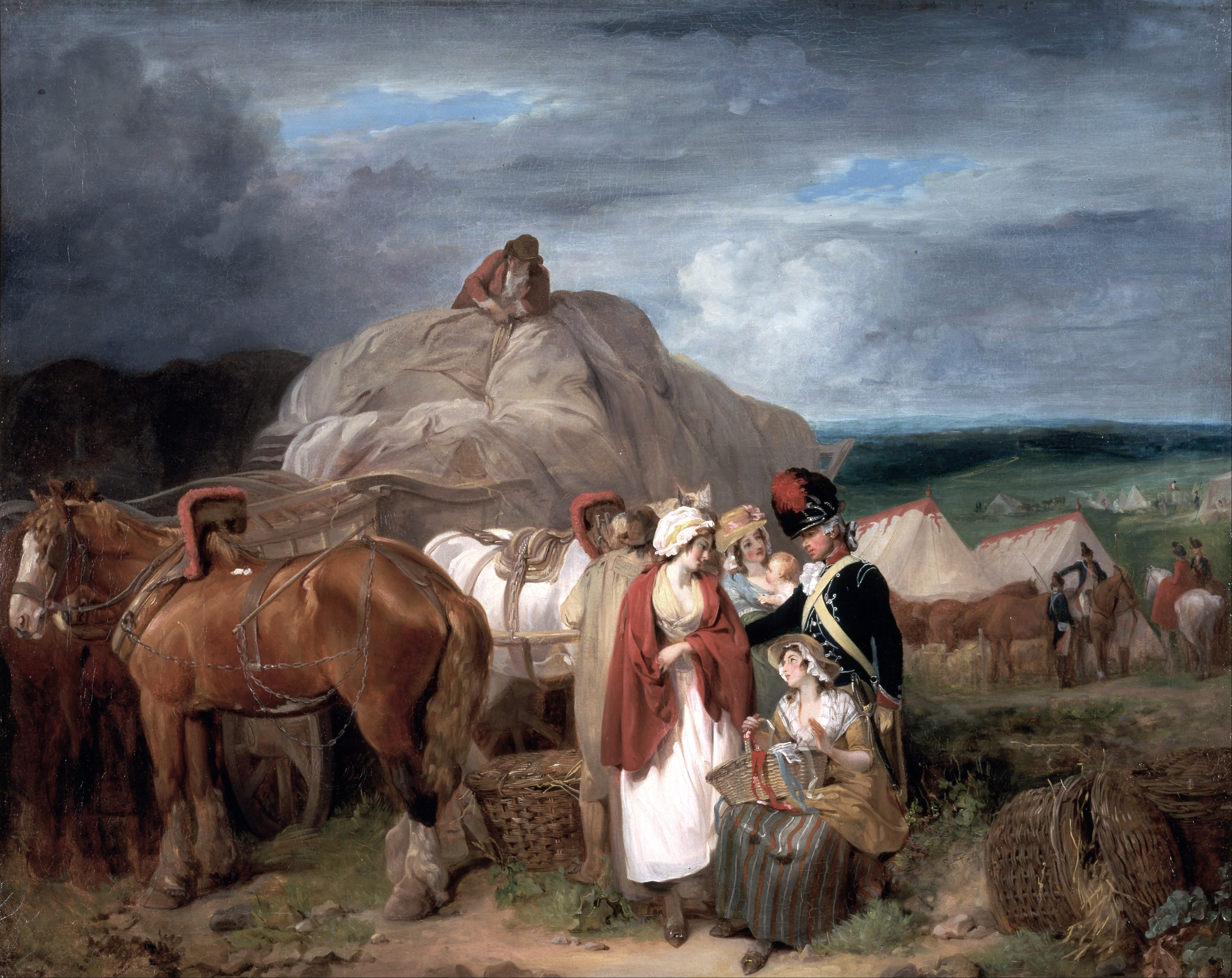
Scene from the Camp at Bagshot Heath by Francis Wheatley

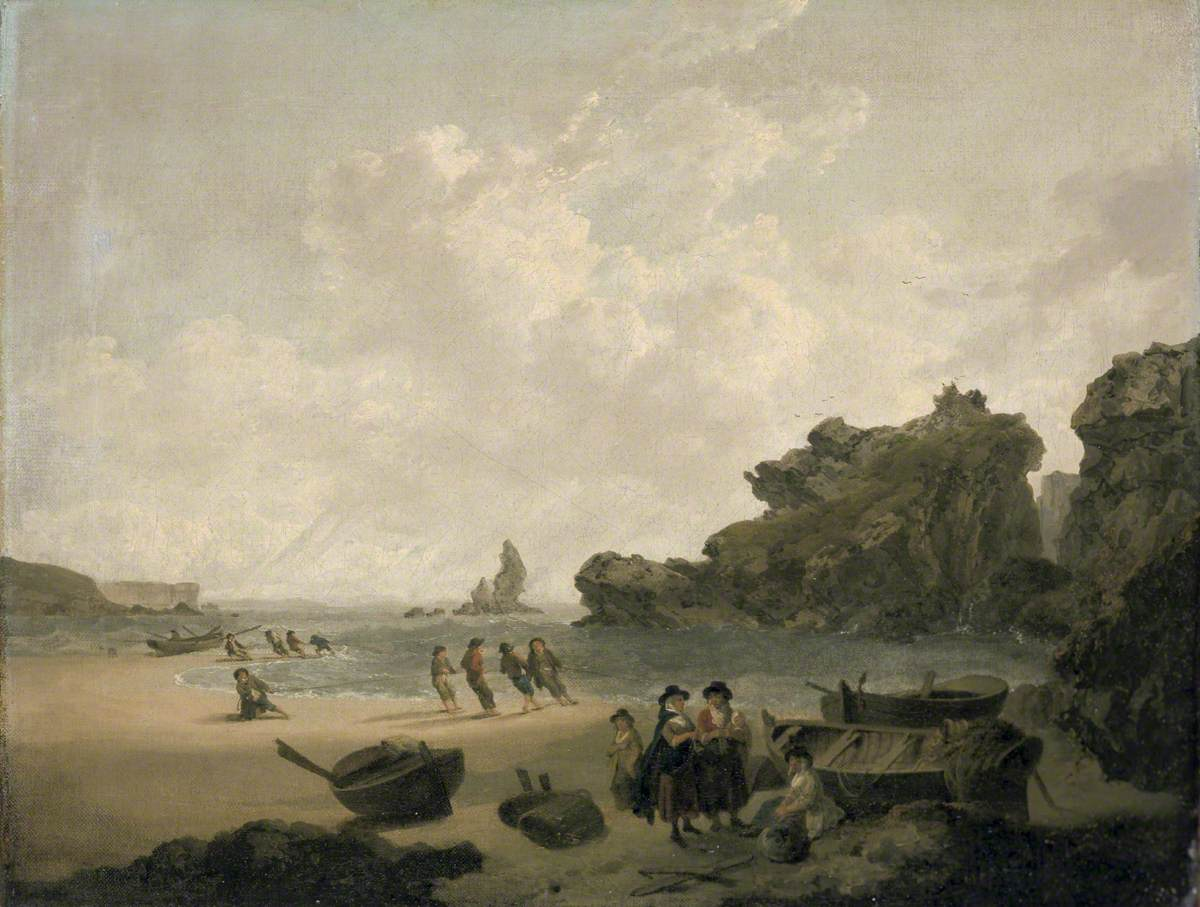
The Stack Rock by Julius Caesar Ibbetson

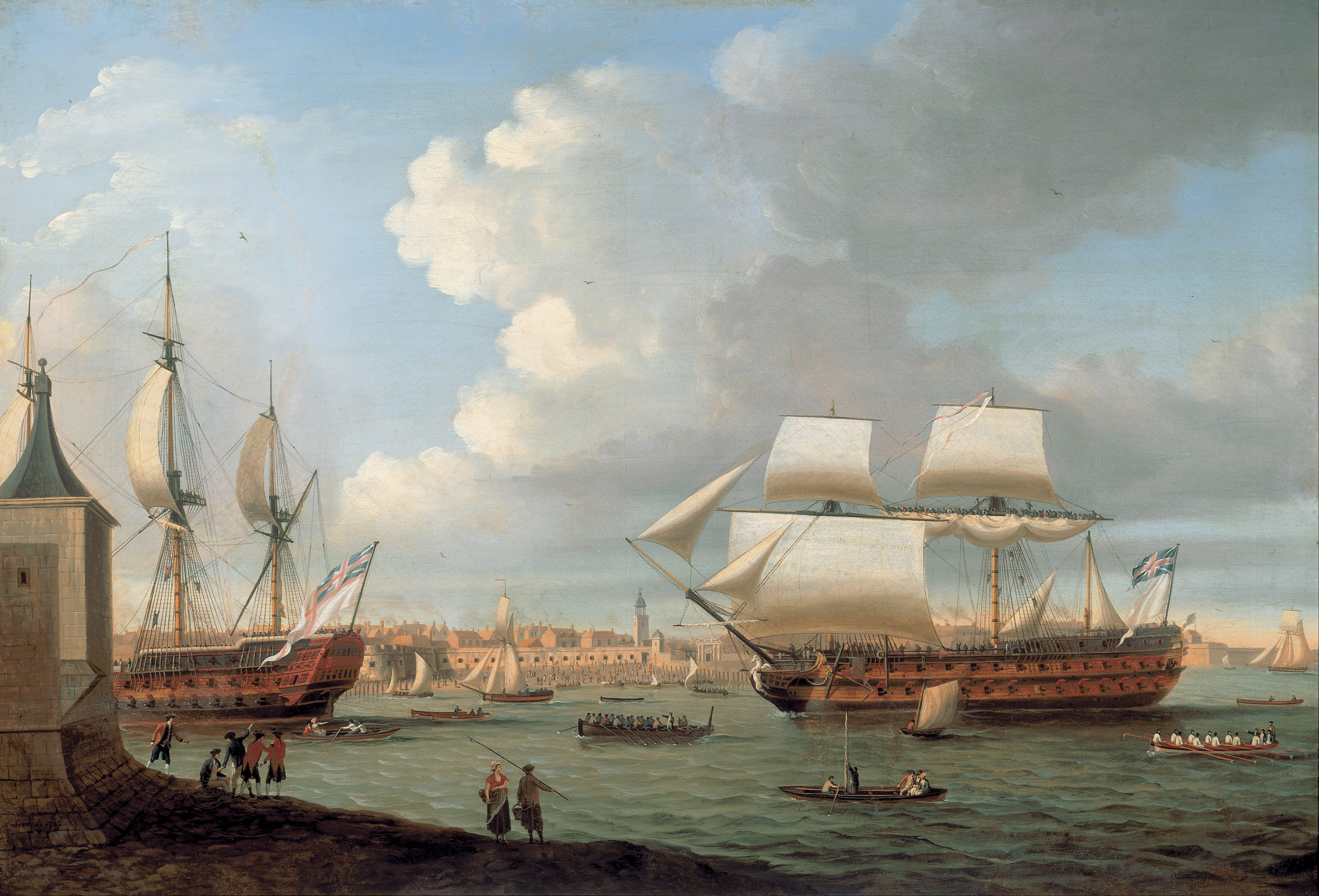
Foudroyant and Pégase entering Portsmouth Harbour by Dominic Serres

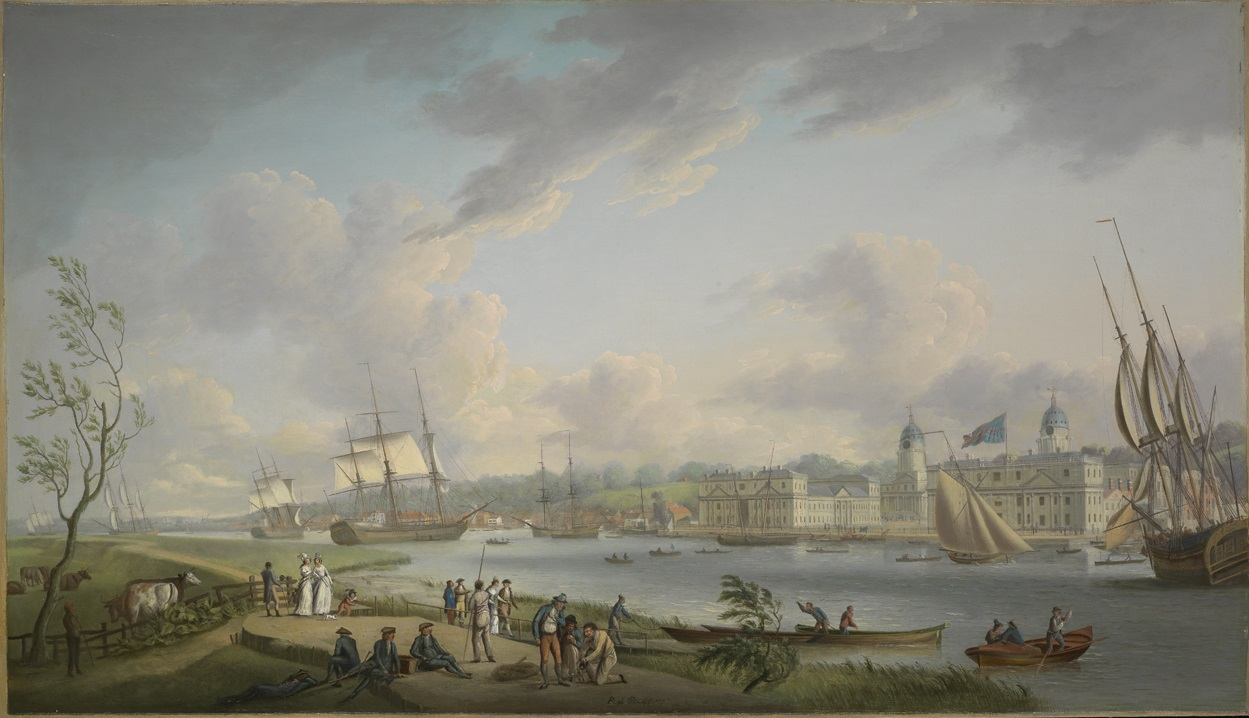
Greenwich from the Isle of Dogs by Robert Dodd

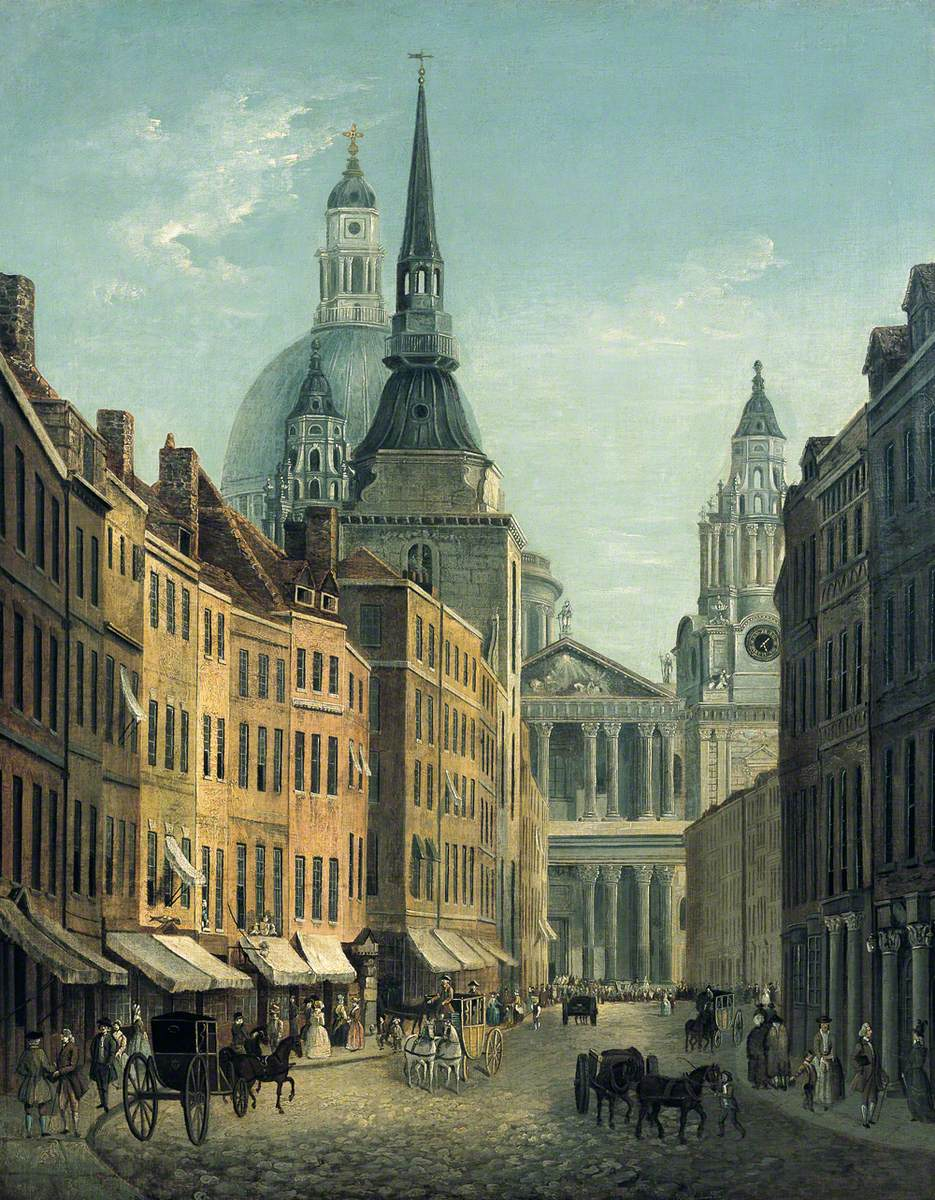
View of Ludgate Hill by William Marlow

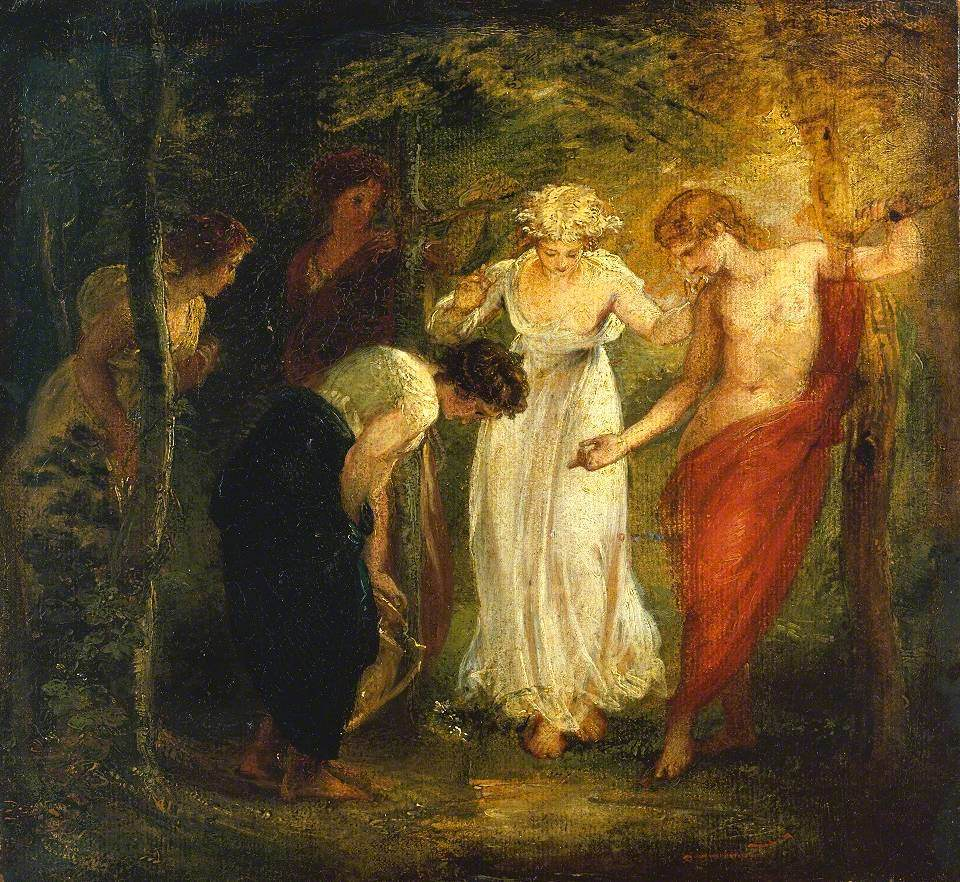
Nymphs Discover the Narcissus by Thomas Stothard

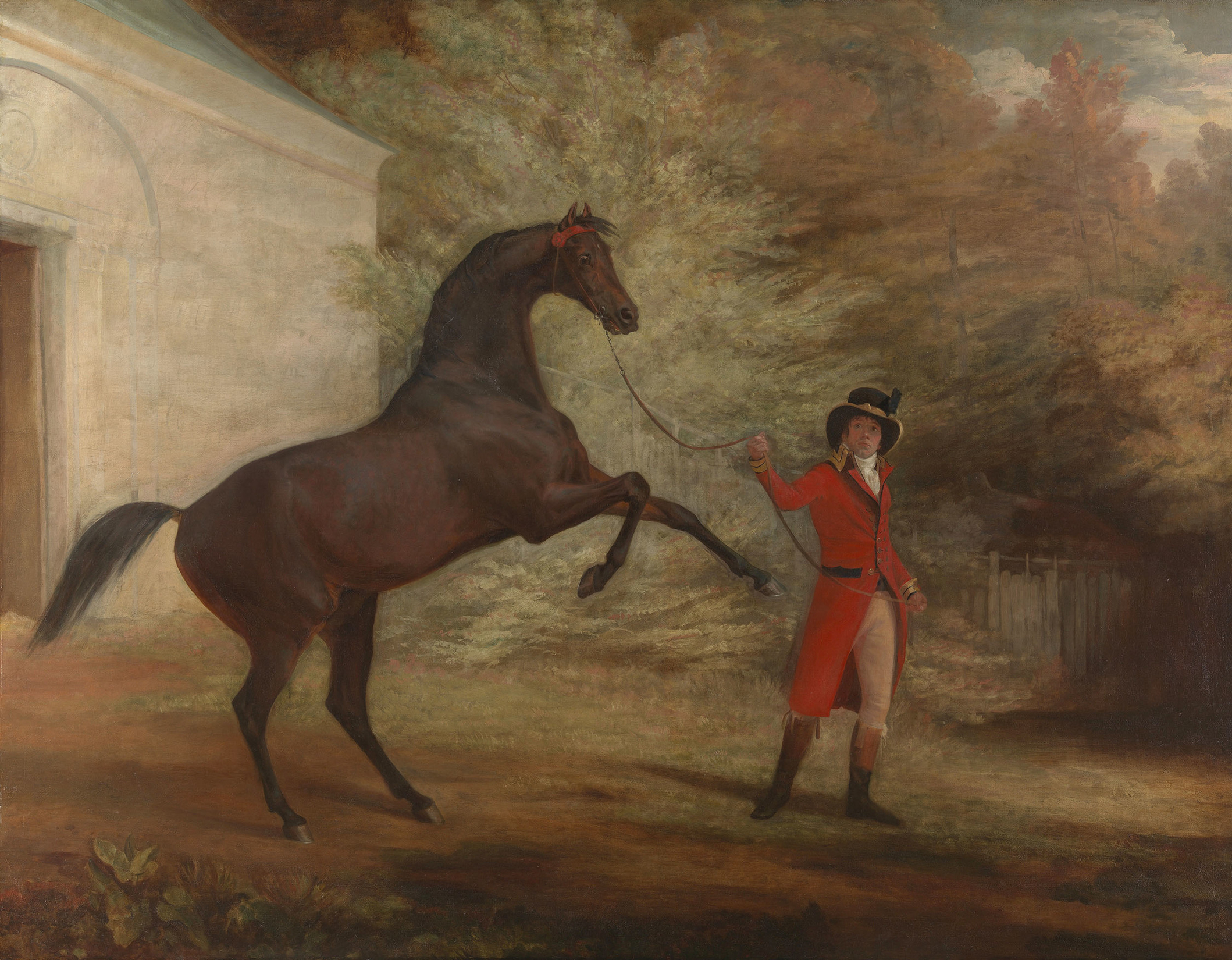
Saltram by George Garrard

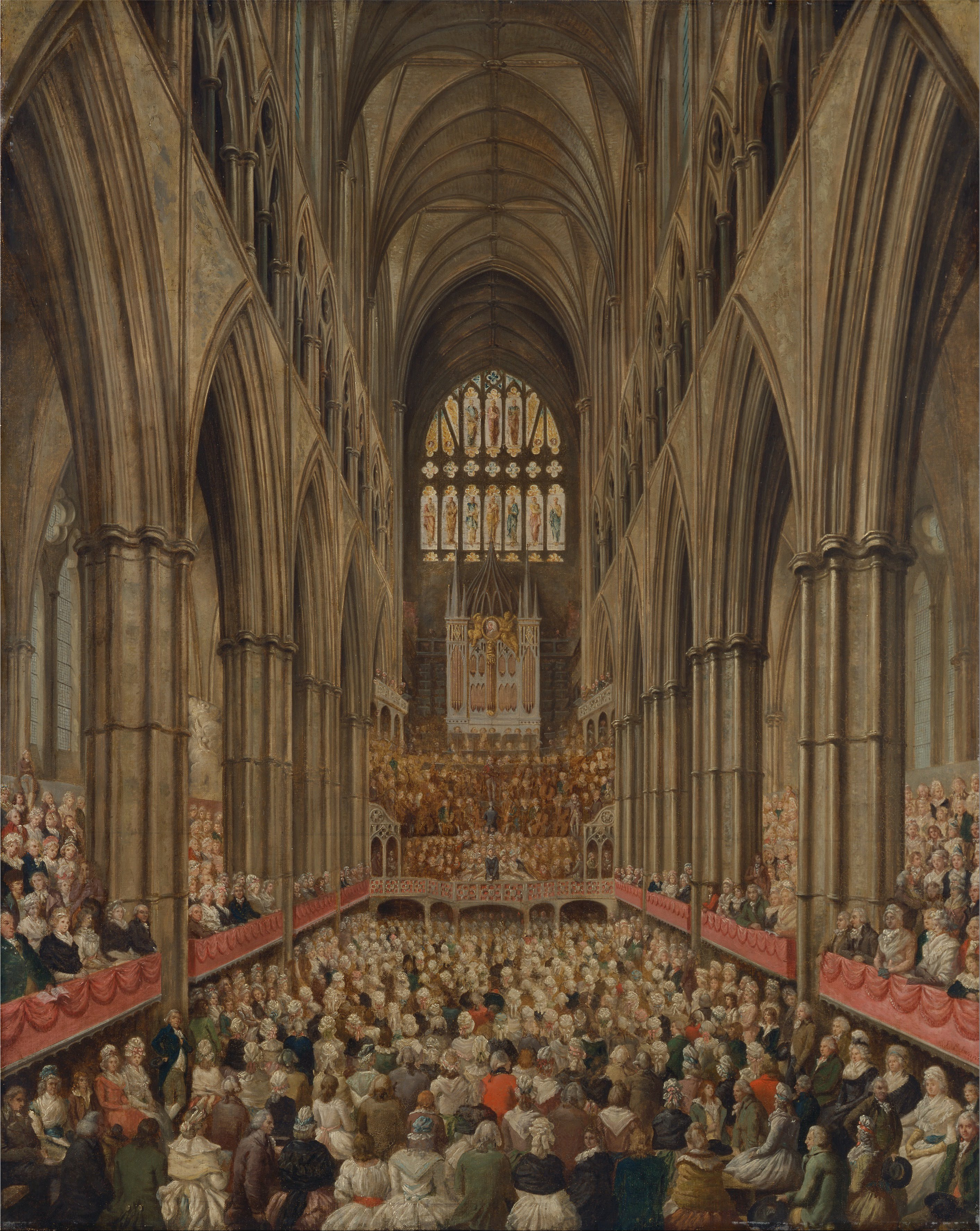
Interior View of Westminster Abbey on the Commemoration of Handel by Edward Edwards

== Bibliography ==
- Levey, Michael. Sir Thomas Lawrence. Yale University Press, 2005.
- McIntyre, Ian. Joshua Reynolds: The Life and Times of the First President of the Royal Academy. Allen Lane, 2003.
- Solkin, David H. (ed.) Art on the Line: The Royal Academy Exhibitions at Somerset House, 1780-1836. Courthald Gallery, 2001.
- Wright, Amina. Thomas Lawrence: Coming of Age. Bloomsbury Publishing, 2020.
