= The Oxbow =

1836 painting by Thomas Cole

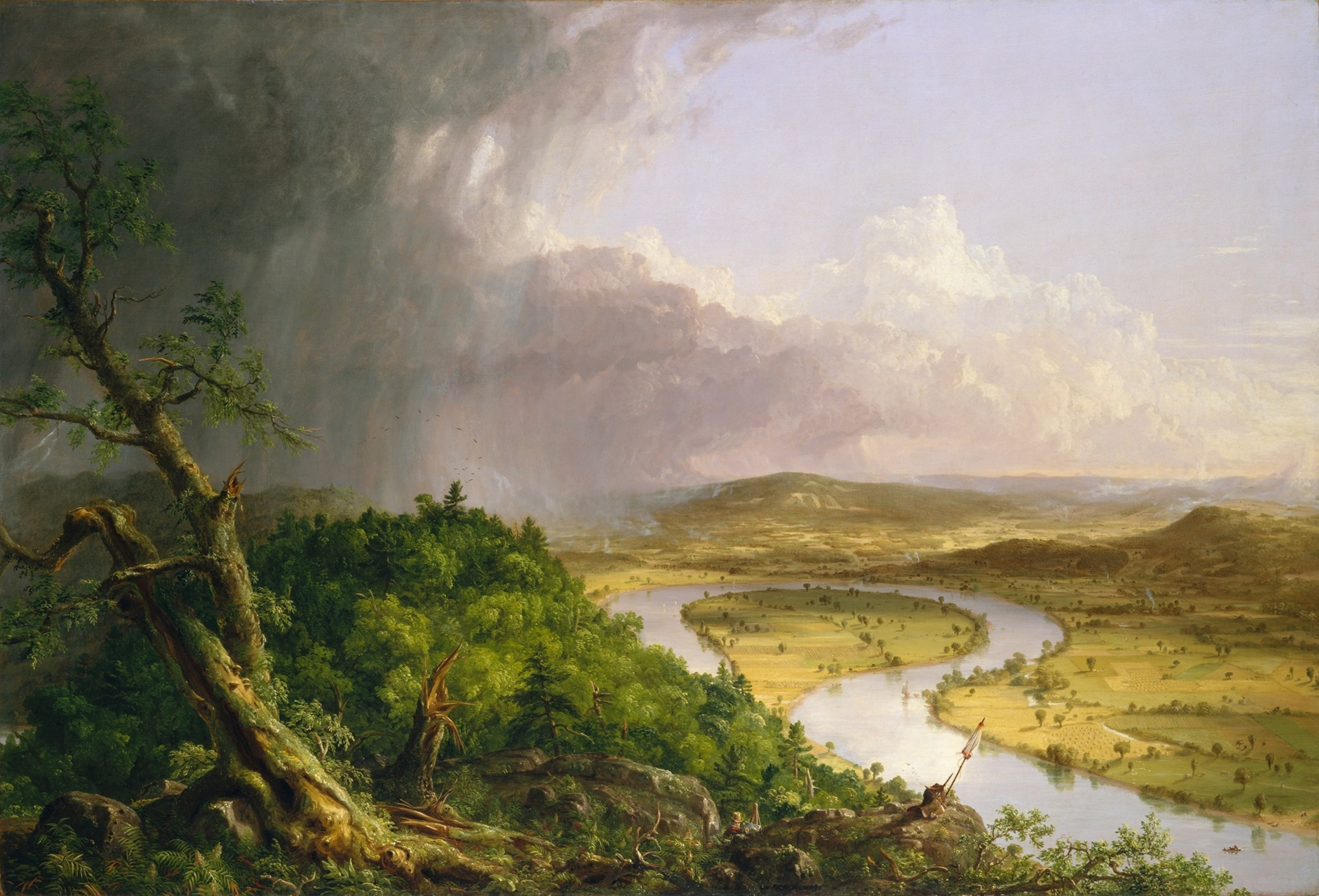
- Artist: Thomas Cole
- Year: 1836
- Medium: Oil on canvas
- Dimensions: 130.8 cm × 193 cm (51 1/2 in × 76 in)
- Location: The Metropolitan Museum of Art; New York
- Accession: 08.228

View from Mount Holyoke, Northampton, Massachusetts, after a Thunderstorm, commonly known as The Oxbow, is a seminal American landscape painting by Thomas Cole, founder of the Hudson River School. The 1836 painting depicts a Romantic panorama of the Connecticut River Valley just after a thunderstorm. It has been interpreted as a confrontation between wilderness and civilization.

== Background ==
Between 1833 and 1836, Thomas Cole, American painter and putative founder of the Hudson River School had been hard at work on his series of paintings The Course of Empire. The work was commissioned by New York patron Luman Reed, who had met Cole in 1832, and the two held a friendship largely based on Reed's generosity in buying Cole's paintings. Reed requested The Course of Empire to comprise no less than five paintings of a historic composition. Cole himself was excited by such a project, but doubt began to set in by the end of 1835. The work was slow and laborious, and Cole found great difficulty in painting the figures. Reed had begun to notice Cole was becoming lonely and depressed, and suggested that he suspend work on The Course of Empire and paint something that was more in his element for the April 1836 opening of the National Academy of Design's annual exhibition. Cole, in replying to Reed in a letter, stated that he felt obliged to finish the series as Reed had been so generous in his support, and instead suggested that he simply complete the last painting in the series and display that at the exhibition. Reed however, did not really like the idea, as he thought it might spoil the unveiling of the series as a whole. He suggested instead that he paint a picture much like the already completed second painting in the series, The Pastoral State. This depicted a peaceful setting which Reed thought "no man ever produced a more pleasing landscape in a more pleasing season." Responding in a letter in March 1836, Cole agreed to take Reed's advice and paint a picture for the exhibition, writing:

Fancy pictures seldom sell & they generally take more time than views so I have determined to paint one of the latter. I have already commenced a view from Mt. Holyoke—it is about the finest scene I have in my sketchbook & is well known—it will be novel and I think effective—I could not find a subject very similar to your second picture & time would not allow me to invent one.

Cole also comments that he used a larger canvas, as he was not able to ready a smaller frame in time for the exhibition, and moreover felt compelled to make a statement with the one painting he was to present.

== Composition ==
The painting moves from a dark wilderness with shattered tree trunks on rugged cliffs in the foreground covered with violent rain clouds on the left to a light-filled and peaceful, cultivated landscape on the right, which borders the tranquility of the bending Connecticut River. The view Cole sought to paint was a particularly difficult one, as its panoramic breadth extended beyond the width of typical landscape paintings of the period. To solve this problem, Cole stitched together two separate views from Mt. Holyoke, creating a synthetic, rather than a faithful, image of the scene. On the hill in the far background, logging scars in the forest can be observed, which appear to form Hebrew letters. This was first noticed by Matthew Baigell long after the landscape was painted. It reads as Noah (נֹ֫חַ). If viewed upside down, as if from God's perspective, the word Shaddai is formed, "The Almighty." Cole gives himself a tiny self-portrait sitting on the rocks in the foreground with his easel.

== Ownership ==
Cole sold the painting at the exhibition to Charles Nicoll Talbot (1802–1874), merchant in the China trade. In 1838 he lent it to the Dunlap Benefit Exhibition, and later to the third annual exhibition of the Artists' Fund Society, which was held in New York in 1862. With his death in 1874, the painting was acquired from his estate by Margaret Olivia Slocum Sage, wife of Russell Sage. Olivia Sage was a known philanthropist, and her transfer of The Oxbow to the Metropolitan Museum of Art in 1908 would seem rather natural. However, she may have been inspired by a similar gesture in 1904 by Samuel P. Avery, Jr., who donated The Titan's Goblet, another of Cole's well-known paintings, to the Metropolitan Museum of Art. Furthermore, Olivia Sage's attorney, Robert W. DeForest, was a secretary on the Board of Trustees of the Metropolitan Museum. The painting today resides in The Metropolitan Museum of Art.

== See also ==
- List of paintings by Thomas Cole
