= Aqueduct near Rome =

1832 painting by Thomas Cole

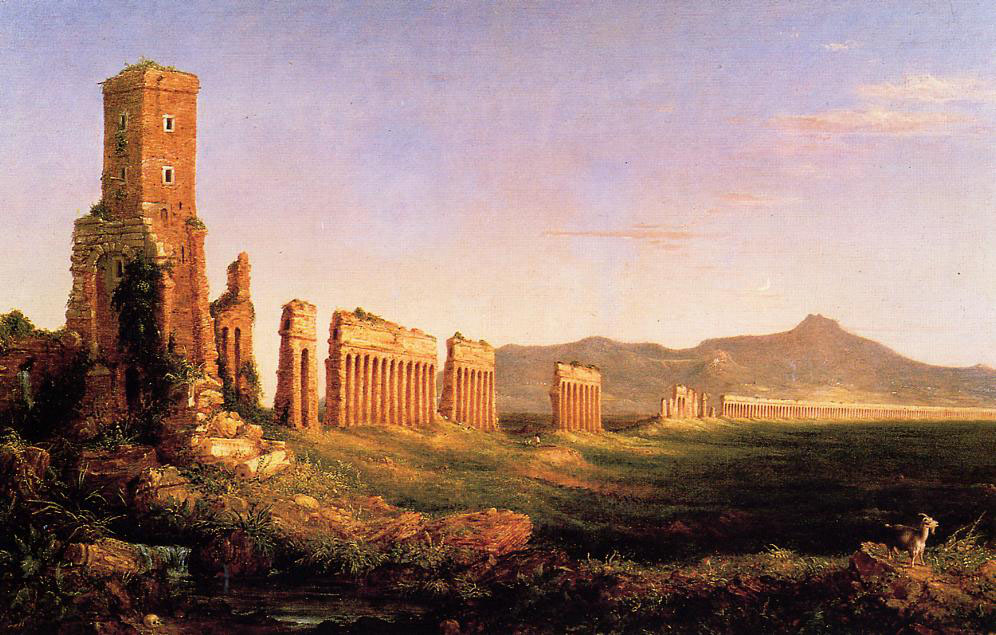
Cole, Aqueduct near Rome, 1832, Mildred Lane Kemper Art Museum

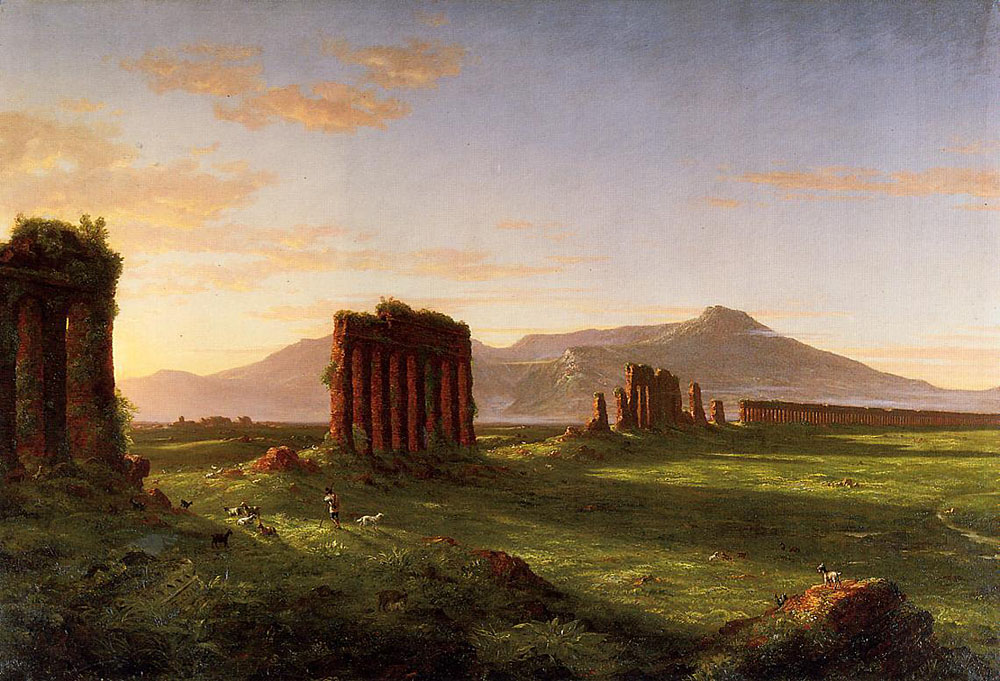
Cole, Roman Campagna, 1843, Wadsworth Atheneum

Aqueduct near Rome is an 1832 oil painting by the English-born American artist Thomas Cole. It measures 44.5 in × 67.3 in (113 cm × 171 cm) and is the largest painting that Cole completed during his first visit to Italy in 1831–32.

The painting was commissioned by another American tourist, Charles Lyman of Waltham, Massachusetts, where his family owned the Lyman Estate. It depicts the ruins of Aqua Claudia, which was completed in the 1st century AD near Rome. The painting was completed in Cole's studio in Florence, based on sketches made while he was visiting Rome. Many preparatory sketches are held by the Detroit Institute of Arts. The original painting was acquired in 1987 by Mildred Lane Kemper Art Museum at Washington University in St. Louis, Missouri.

To the left of the painting is a medieval watchtower built by the Annibaldi family in the 13th century, the Tor Fiscale now in the Tor Fiscale Park, Rome. A line of arches leads away to the right, across the Roman Campagna, towards the Sabine Hills and Alban Hills in the background. The 50 miles (80 km) long aqueduct has fallen into disrepair over the centuries since it was built by the ancient Romans. A skull in the left foreground alongside fallen architecture is a memento mori, mediating on time and impermanence. In the middle distance is a herder with a dog and his flock of goats, one of which stands in the right foreground.

The painting was exhibited at the National Academy of Design in New York City in 1833, and it was engraved by James Smillie. The composition was successful, and the work was described by Nathaniel Parker Willis as "one of the finest landscapes ever painted" (published by John Macrone in 1835). The style and subject matter prefigure Cole's Course of Empire series of 1836.

On his return to Rome in 1841–42, Cole was commissioned to paint a second slightly smaller version, 82.6 cm × 122 cm (32.5 in × 48.0 in), completed in 1843 and now held by the Wadsworth Atheneum, along with a second painting, Evening in Arcadia (1843), of similar dimensions, also in Wadsworth Atheneum. Both were bequests to the gallery by Clara Hinton Gould (Mrs Frederick Saltonstall Gould) in 1948. The 1843 version of the painting depicts a different time of day, with the goat herder in a different position, and omits the Tor Fiscale and the left portion of his 1832 painting.

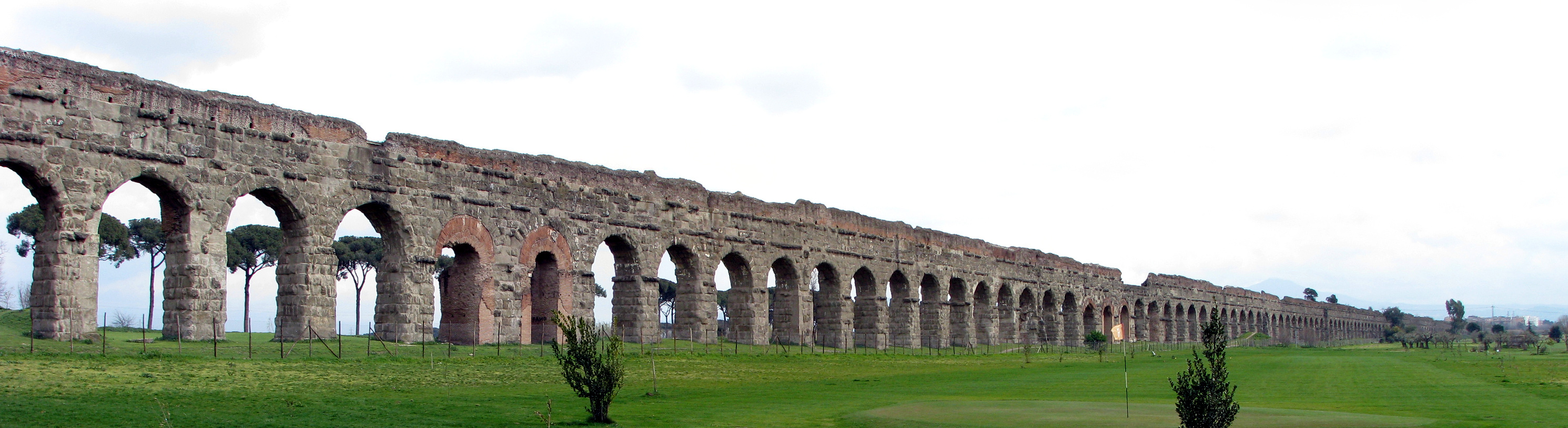
Panoramic view of the aqueduct, near the Via Lemonia

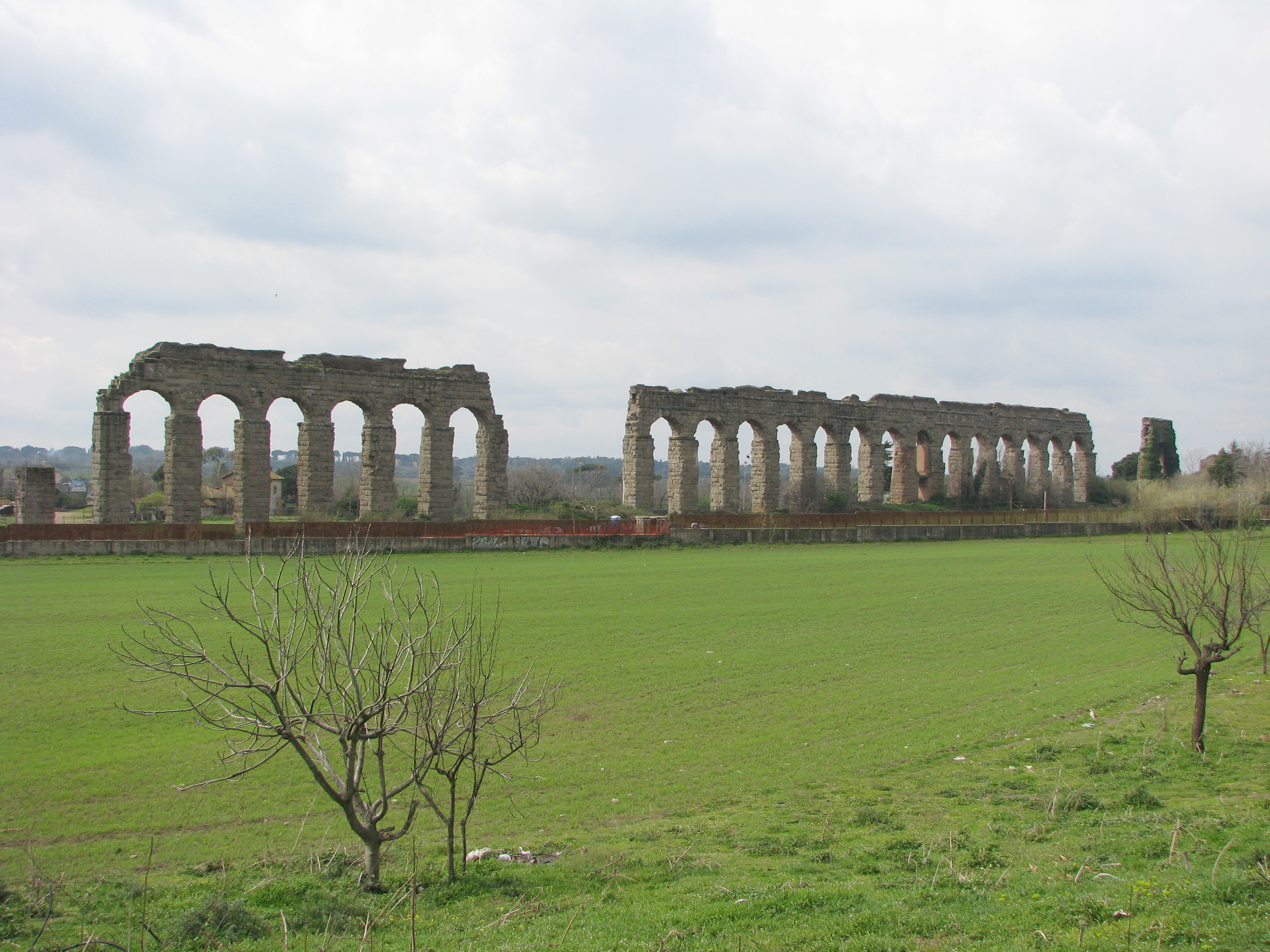
Part of the Aqua Claudia

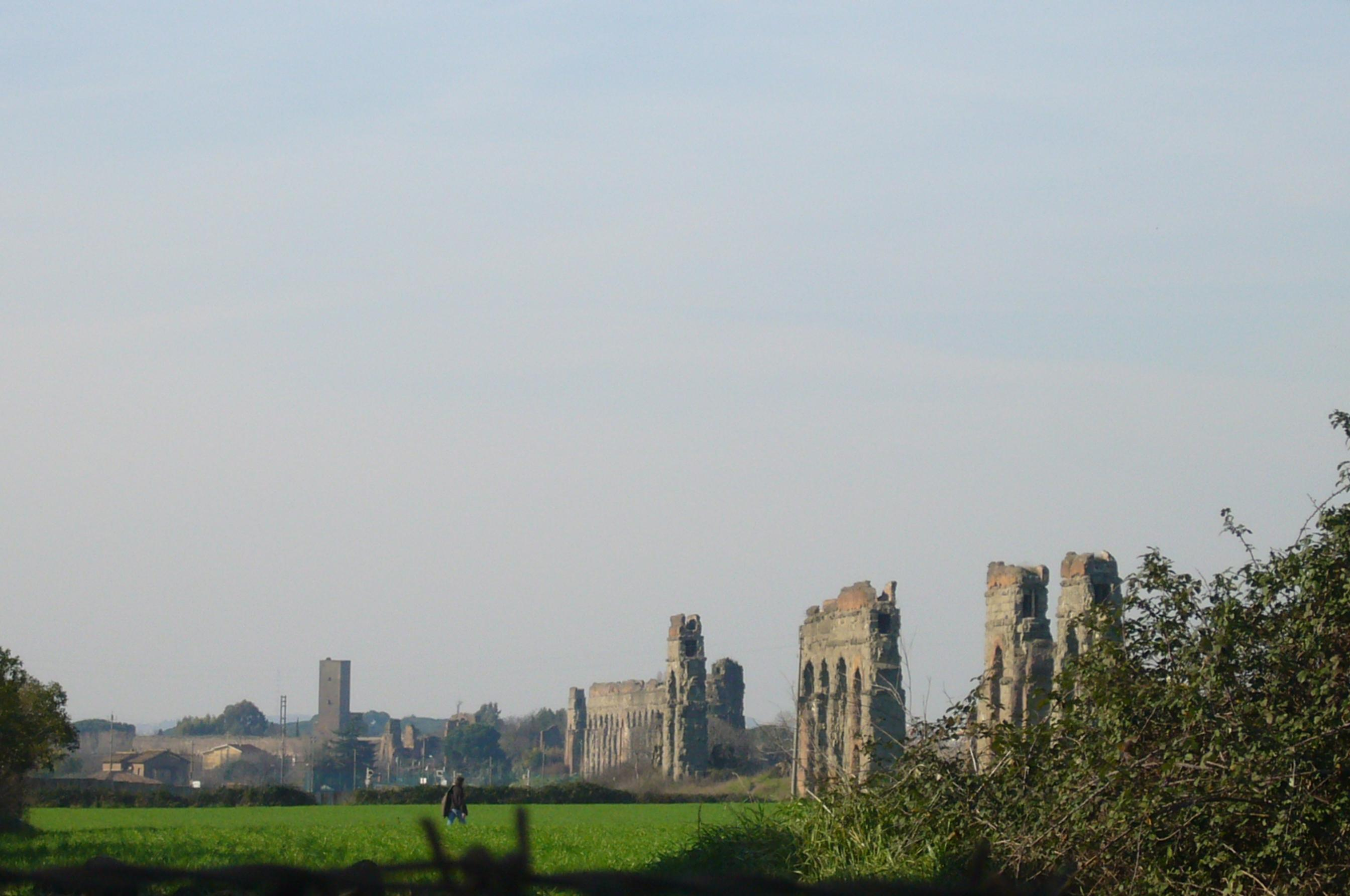
Part of the Aqua Claudia, with the Tor Fiscale in the distance

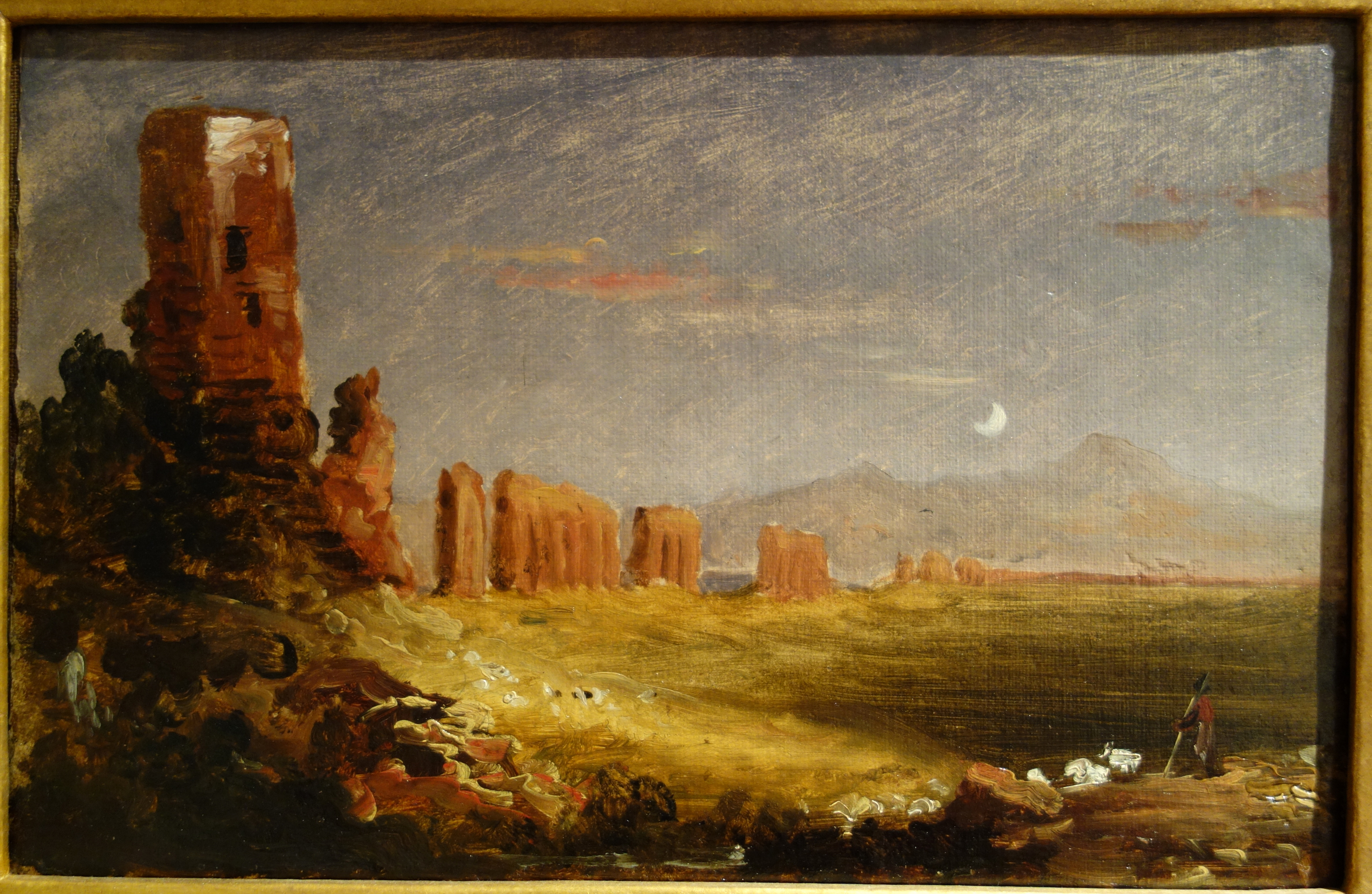
Sketch for Aqueduct near Rome, c. 1832, New Britain Museum of American Art, Connecticut

== See also ==
- List of paintings by Thomas Cole
