= Prometheus Bound (Thomas Cole) =

Painting by Thomas Cole

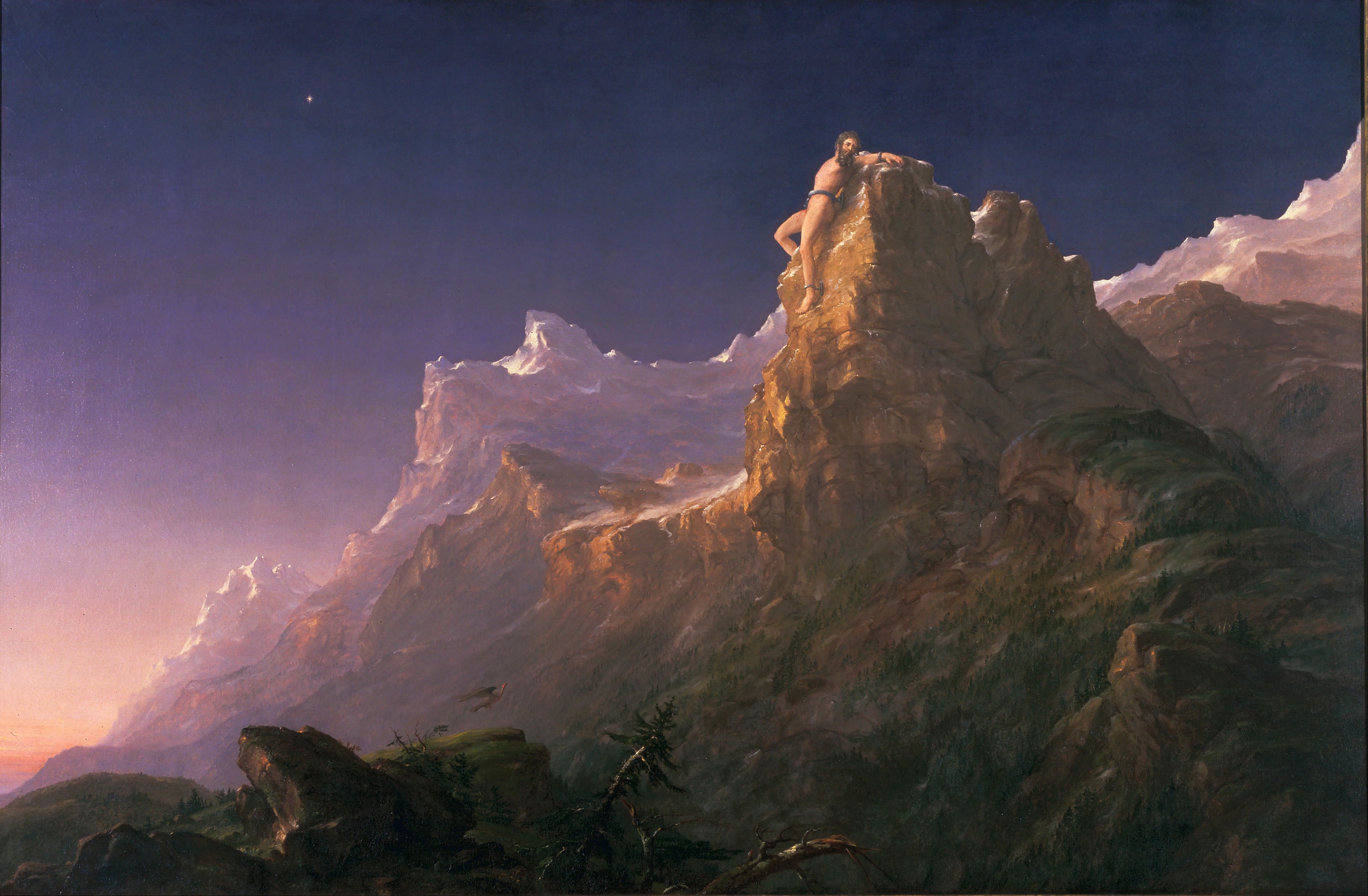
- Artist: Thomas Cole
- Year: 1847
- Medium: Oil on canvas
- Dimensions: 160 cm × 240 cm (64 in × 96 in)
- Location: Fine Arts Museums of San Francisco, San Francisco, California

Prometheus Bound is an 1847 oil painting by American artist Thomas Cole. Prometheus Bound is one of Cole's largest paintings, and like his other major works of the 1840s it was not the result of a commission. It draws from the ancient Greek tragedy Prometheus Bound by Aeschylus. In the painting, Prometheus is chained to a rock on Mount Caucasus in Scythia. Zeus has punished him for endowing humans with life, knowledge, and specifically for giving humans fire. Each day a raptor comes to feed on Prometheus's liver, which regrows between visits, making Zeus's punishment even more cruel.

The allegorical painting is among Cole's last works, but Cole never commented on the theme of the work. Art historians have tentatively linked the bondage of Prometheus to abolitionist sentiment by reviewing the presentation of the mythical figure in contemporaneous literature. Cole sent it to London for an 1847 exhibit and competition to decorate the Houses of Parliament, and the painting was still in London when he died. It thus received little exhibition in the United States in the 1840s, making its reception (and its theme) difficult to judge.

== Description ==
Cole was a landscape painter who often employed allegory in his works, such as The Titan's Goblet and The Voyage of Life. The story of Prometheus strictly belongs to the genre of history painting. In Prometheus Bound, the landscape is appropriately desolate; above Prometheus are imposing, snowy mountains and a cold sky. The figure himself blends in with the rocks, a conscious decision of the artist that adds an element of surprise for the viewer when the figure is finally seen; the viewer's surprise emphasizes Prometheus's desperate and desolate situation. Upon further inspection a vulture is seen lower in the painting, swooping up toward Prometheus. The raptor comes at dawn, when the planet Jupiter (the "morning star") is seen in the sky. As the Roman god Jupiter is the equivalent of Zeus, Prometheus's antagonist symbolically watches over him.

Technically, the rendition of light on snow is very skilled; Cole used a red underpaint with white to render the mountains. The famous American landscape artist Frederic Edwin Church wrote in 1876 to Cole's son, "I've always admired greatly the sky of that picture, deeming it the finest morning effect I ever saw painted".

== Interpretation ==
There is no record of Cole commenting on the theme of Prometheus Bound. Art historian Patricia Junker notes that writers and artists often took up the myth of Prometheus in the decades before Cole's painting; they include Lord Byron, James Gates Percival, Elizabeth Barrett Browning, James Russell Lowell, Henry David Thoreau, and Henry Wadsworth Longfellow. Prometheus in bondage was seen as having an "indomitable spirit" and could "serve as a potent object lesson for political and social reform". Thoreau had recently translated Aeschylus's play, noting in his forward the increasing interest in Prometheus. Percival published an anti-slavery poem called "Prometheus" in 1843, a time when slavery and abolitionism were controversial topics in the U.S. It is possible that Cole used the bondage of Prometheus as a comment on slavery, as he saw art as a potential moral influence on society.

== Exhibition and early reception ==
Painted toward the end of Cole's life, Prometheus Bound followed a period in which Cole worked on his ambitious but never-finished painting series The Cross and the World. In this five-part series he had intended to contrast two travellers as they set out from the central image, one on a spiritual and the other a worldly journey. Beginning in February 1846, Cole abandoned that project and developed sketches and studies over the next fifteen months for Prometheus Bound. The 1840s saw Cole developing larger, monumental canvases. Confident in his work and not limited in subject by commissions, he conceived his larger paintings as exhibition works. Cole submitted Prometheus Bound to the 1847 exhibition at Westminster Hall, London, the third in a series of competitions to select art for the British Houses of Parliament. The competition offered cash prizes, the possibility of a fresco commission, and the chance for recognition in the press through reproductions in the Illustrated London News and lithographs by print publishers. However, the painting's subject matter was a poor fit, as the exhibit required any allegorical paintings to relate to the history of Great Britain; and during the exhibition it was "skied"—placed very highly on the wall where viewers might not have seen the details. The painting did not win a prize and received little press attention.

To gauge public response, Cole first showed the work at the New-York Gallery of Fine Arts along with the collection of his one-time patron Luman Reed. It was well received; the Literary World wrote, "The whole composition produces in the mind of the spectator a feeling of utter loneliness and desertion; which was, unquestionably, the artist's aim. The star of Jupiter is seen above, hovering within sight of his victim, and one feels, in looking at him, as if he were placed there for all time to gloat on the agonies of the tortured Prometheus.... We wish Mr. Cole could find it in his heart and in his way to treat us oftener to his imaginative creations. They give a dignity to art which the mass of modern artists do not seem to appreciate".

Cole's early biographer, Louis Legrand Noble, commented on the painting:

[It] is an image of the physical sublime. Earth and air—dark blue depths of illimitable ether—vasty foundations—mighty summits helmeted with the crystal of eternal winter, glittering under the white cold Jupiter, in the first golden flashes of the day. It is the huge embodiment of that single thought, haunting the universe, The Everlasting, ... it is almost utter simplicity—one and simple as a roll of thunder. It is the product of a single blow of genius.... The failing of the Prometheus—no great, if we choose to drop the name, and call it the Alps, or Andes in the dawn—is its deficiency in moral meaning. The sense of suffering is well nigh hushed in the deep strong voice of visible nature. The passion of the figure ... is almost entirely swept away in the tide of the one mighty expression of the landscape: and would have been so, had that figure been painted by Michael Angelo himself.

Charles Lanman included Prometheus Bound in his The Epic Paintings of Thomas Cole (1848), praising it as "one of the wildest and most splendid efforts of the painter's pencil ... one of the most truly sublime paintings we have ever seen".

The painting was still in London when Cole died in 1848. The Fine Arts Museums of San Francisco acquired it in June 1997.

== See also ==
- List of paintings by Thomas Cole
