= The Subsiding of the Waters of the Deluge =

1829 painting by Thomas Cole

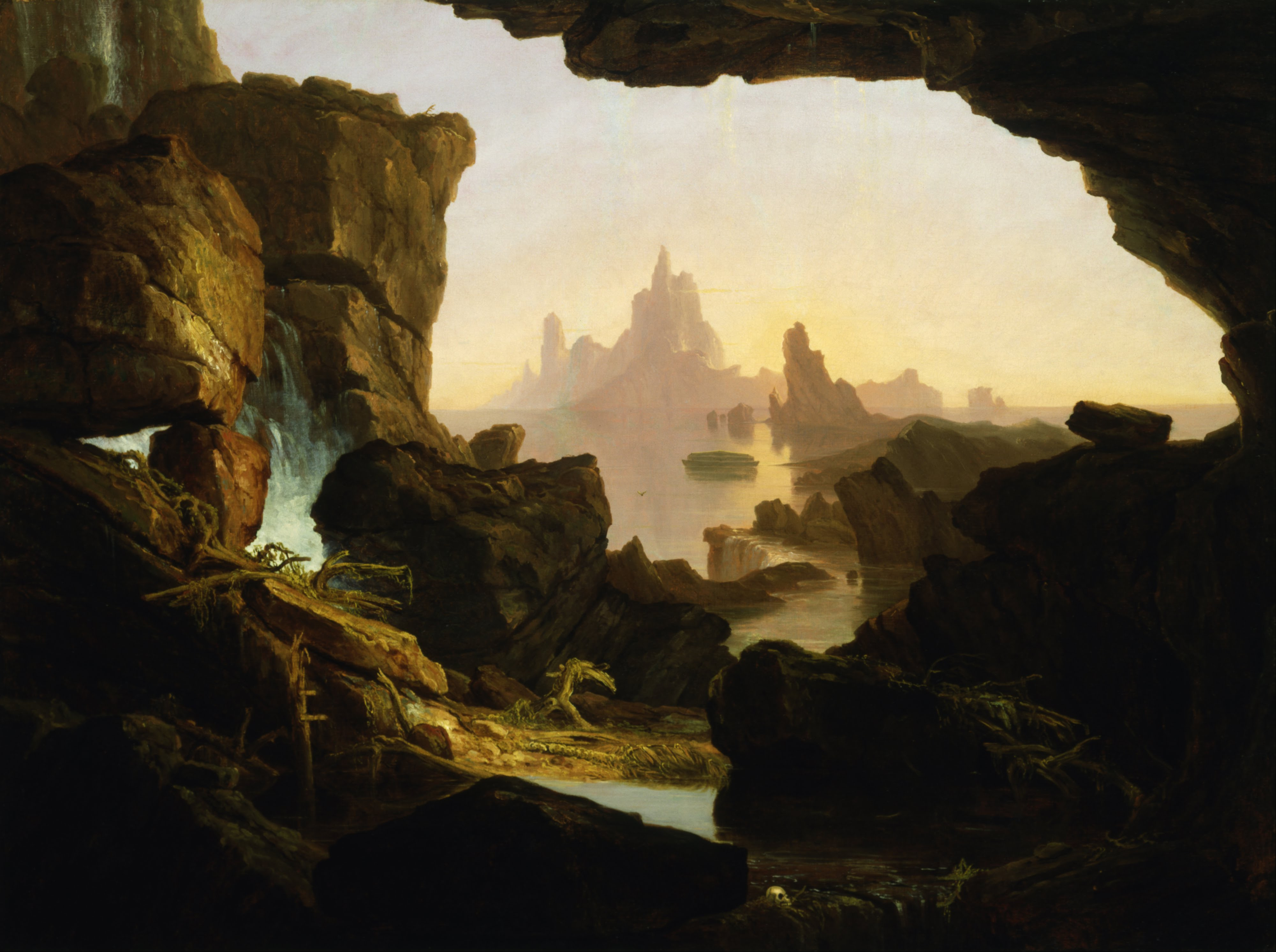
- Artist: Thomas Cole
- Year: 1829
- Medium: Oil on canvas
- Dimensions: 90.8 cm × 121.4 cm (35 3/4 in × 47 3/4 in)
- Location: Smithsonian American Art Museum; Washington, D.C.
- Accession: 1983.40

The Subsiding of the Waters of the Deluge is an 1829 painting by English-born American artist Thomas Cole depicting the aftermath of the Great Flood.

The painting is a 90.8 x 121.4 cm oil on canvas. It is on display at the Smithsonian American Art Museum in Washington, D.C.

== Background ==
Cole collected extensive notes on geology before painting. He consulted geologists and other scientists such as Benjamin Silliman to gather background information on what the world might have looked like after the Biblical Flood.

== Description ==
The painting shows a barren rocky coastscape as seen from the viewpoint of a cavern. A waterfall created by the receding waters of the Flood flows towards the sea. Debris such as broken trees, a destroyed mast, and even a skull are seen upon the coast. The land has been stripped of soil. The sky outside the cavern is bright and in the distance floats an Ark and a dove flies.

== Interpretation ==
The painting has been interpreted as representing rebirth and redemption through destruction. The cleansing nature of the Flood is meant to represent America as a "New Eden" free of the abusive power of the European monarchies.

== History ==
In 1829 and 1831 the painting was on exhibit at the National Academy of Design. It was subsequently lost until 1974.

== See also ==
- List of paintings by Thomas Cole
- The Destruction of Pompeii and Herculaneum, a sightly earlier painting with a similar light and dark framing
