= Genesee Scenery =

Painting by Thomas Cole

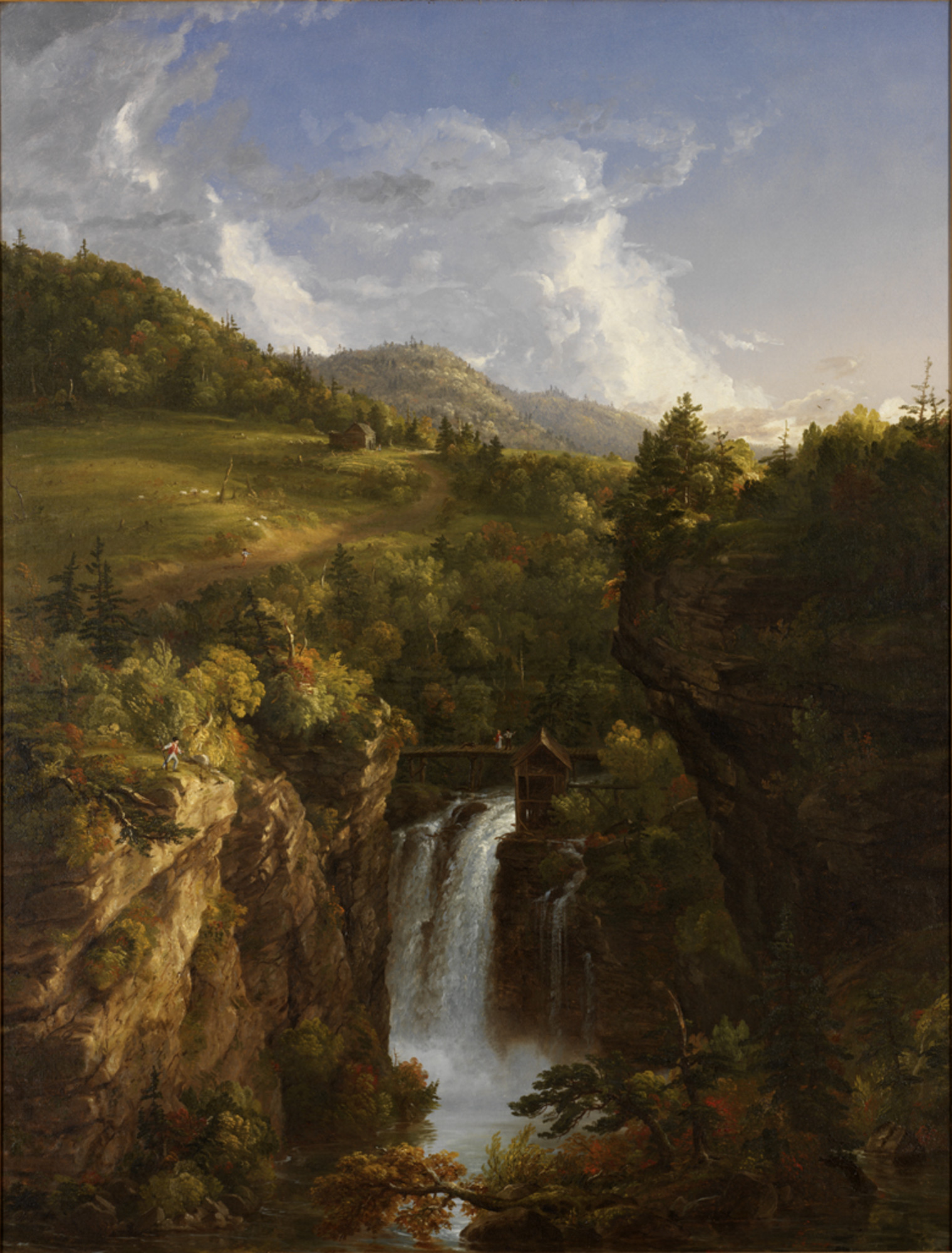
- Artist: Thomas Cole
- Year: 1847
- Medium: Oil on Canvas
- Dimensions: 130.8 cm × 99.7 cm (51.5 in × 39.25 in)
- Location: Rhode Island School of Design Museum of Art; Providence, Rhode Island

Genesee Scenery, also called Mountain Landscape with Waterfall, is an 1847 oil on canvas painting by British-born American painter Thomas Cole, founder of the Hudson River School. The work depicts the Genesee River in New York State.

== Artist's background ==
Tom Christopher wrote that “[Thomas] Cole’s greatest artistic asset proved to be his untutored eye.” Cole emigrated to America with his family in the spring of 1819 at the age of eighteen. As a child, his surroundings were of Lancashire, England, an area known to be an epicenter of Britain’s primarily industrial region. Because of this, Cole was granted an additional clarity of and sensitivity to the vibrancy of American landscapes awash with color, a stark contrast to the bleak and subdued landscapes of the country he left behind.

== History ==
Cole was the first person to depict this section of the Genesee River. The work is currently owned by the Rhode Island School of Design Museum of Art.

== See also ==
- List of paintings by Thomas Cole
