= Cross at Sunset =

Painting by Thomas Cole

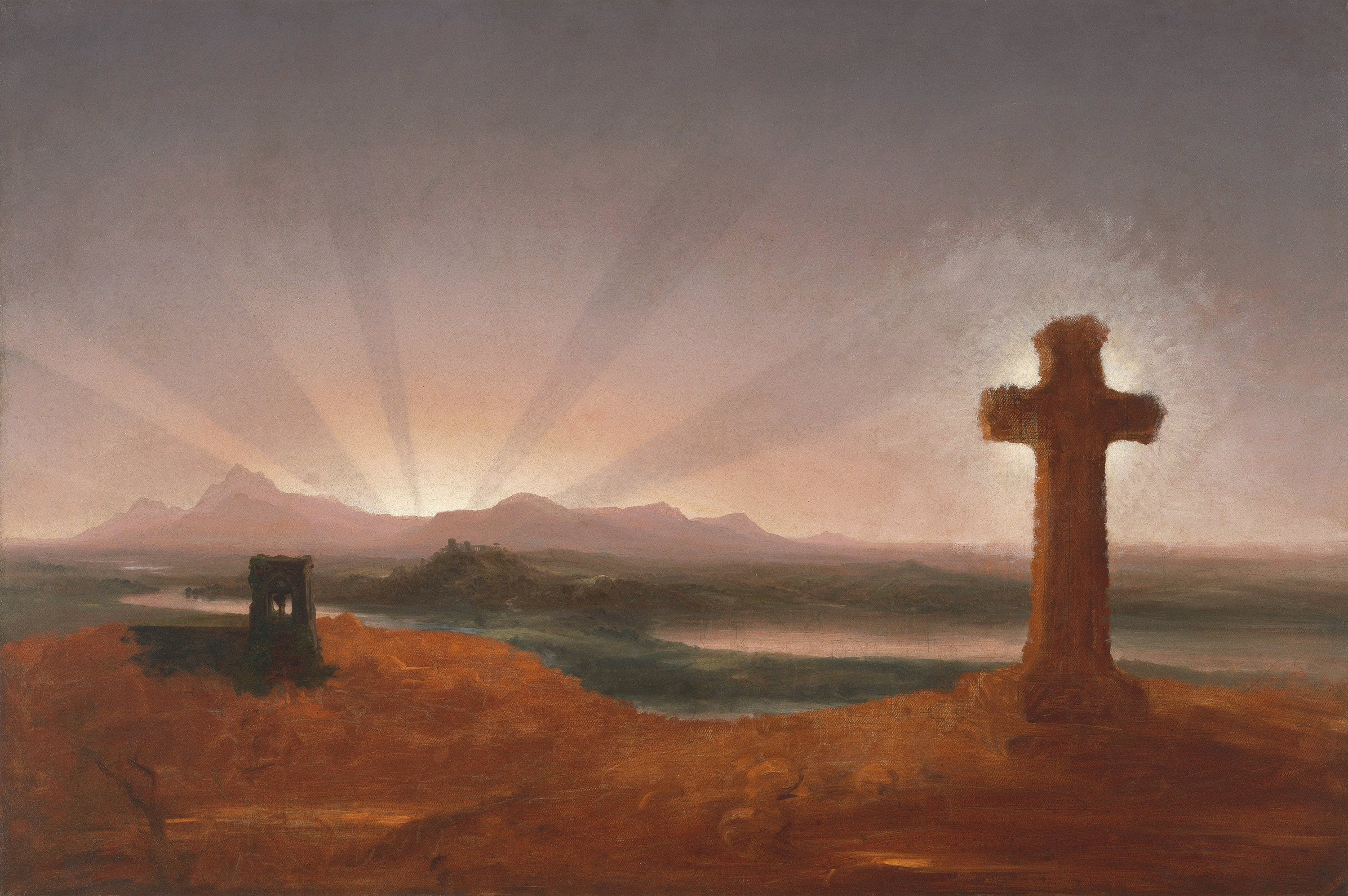
- Cross at Sunset c. 1848
- Artist: Thomas Cole
- Year: 1848
- Medium: Oil on Canvas
- Dimensions: 91.1 cm × 121.9 cm (35.8 in × 47.9 in)
- Location: Thyssen-Bornemisza Museum; Madrid

Cross at Sunset is an oil on canvas painting by Thomas Cole. Believed to have been created around 1848, it was left unfinished due to his premature death that year.

== Artist's background ==
Tom Christopher wrote that “[Thomas] Cole’s greatest artistic asset proved to be his untutored eye.” Cole emigrated to America with his family in the spring of 1819 at the age of eighteen. As a child, his surroundings were of Lancashire, England, an area known to be an epicenter of Britain’s primarily industrial region. Because of this, Cole was granted an additional clarity of and sensitivity to the vibrancy of American landscapes awash with color, a stark contrast to the bleak and subdued landscapes of the country he left behind. As he aged and recognized his own mortality, Cole transitioned away from natural landscape paintings to focus on works conveying religious and spiritual themes.

== Composition ==
Due to it being unfinished, it is possible to see the underdrawing and the undertone applied in the foreground.

== See also ==
- List of paintings by Thomas Cole
