= Lake with Dead Trees =

Painting by Thomas Cole

Lake with Dead Trees (Catskill)
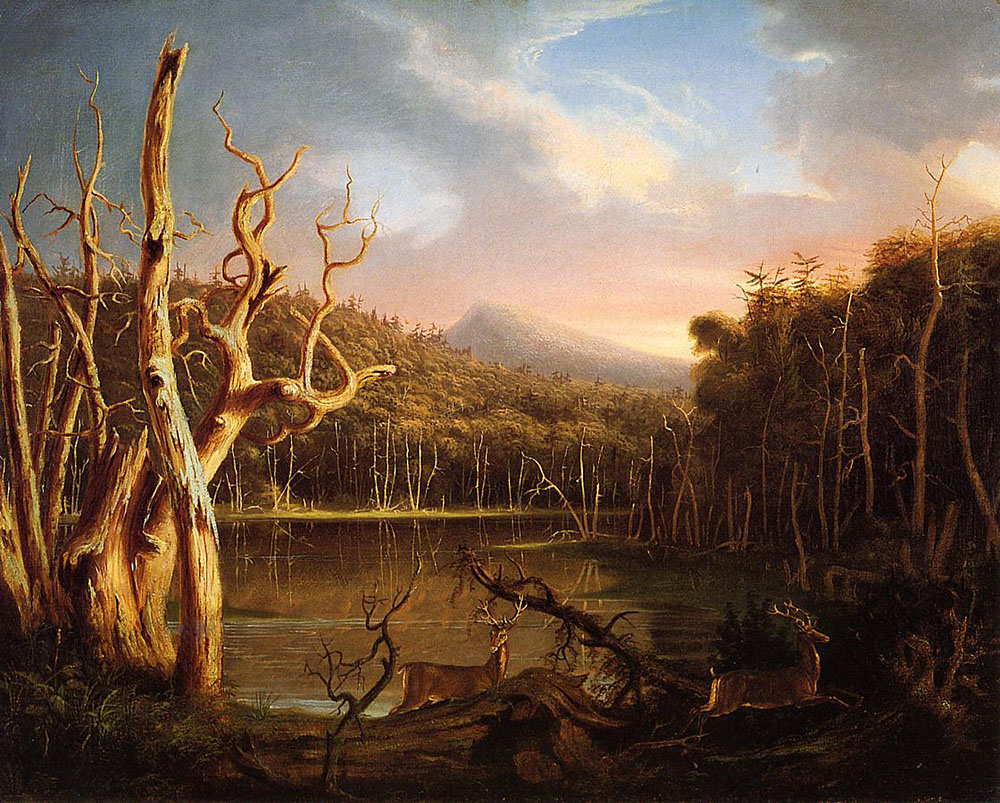
- Lake with Dead Trees (Catskill) 1825
- Artist: Thomas Cole
- Year: 1825high
- Medium: Oil on Canvas
- Dimensions: 68.6 cm × 85.8 cm (27 in × 33 3/4 in)
- Location: Allen Memorial Art Museum; Oberlin, Ohio

Lake with Dead Trees, also known as Catskill, is an oil-on-canvas painting completed in 1825 by Thomas Cole. Depicting a scene in the Catskill Mountains in southeastern New York State, this work is one of five of Cole's 1825 landscapes that initiated the mid-19th century American art movement known as the Hudson River School.

== Artist's Background ==
Tom Christopher wrote that “[Thomas] Cole’s greatest artistic asset proved to be his untutored eye.” Cole emigrated to America with his family in the spring of 1819 at the age of eighteen. As a child, his surroundings were of Lancashire, England, an area known to be an epicenter of Britain’s primarily industrial region. Because of this, Cole was granted an additional clarity of and sensitivity to the vibrancy of American landscapes awash with color, a stark contrast to the bleak and subdued landscapes of the country he left behind.

== Lake with Dead Trees and the Hudson River School ==
When Cole emerged from the Catskill mountains in 1825, not only would he bring with him some of the first renderings of the Catskills in his first five landscape paintings, but in those paintings, he brought a new style of art. This style would come to be known as the Hudson River School, a style that would sweep across the United States in celebration of one of America’s most prized attributes, our natural resources and wildernesses. Curator of American Paintings and Sculpture at the Metropolitan Museum, H. Barbara Weinberg described the style as, “Antebellum encounters with barely tamed nature, lovingly recorded in meticulous botanical detail and overwhelming in scale in comparison with those who enjoy its pleasures...”.

== Financial value ==
Among those five paintings, the first of their kind, stands Lake with Dead Trees. The oil-on-canvas painting was sold originally for twenty-five dollars in 1825. Allowing for 191 years of inflation, the sum’s equivalent would now be $537.86. While that was considered a respectable price and sale at the time, another work by Thomas Cole, Part of the Ruins of Kenilworth Castle, was recently put up to be auctioned with an appraisal of the painting estimated to be $200,000 to $300,000. A style that began nearly two hundred years ago is still viable and commercially successful. Currently, the original resides at the Allen Memorial Art Museum of Oberlin College in Oberlin, Ohio, as it has since its donation in 1904 by Charles F. Olney.

== Visual analysis and composition ==
Simply named, Lake with Dead Trees exemplifies the typical stylistic traits of the Hudson River School art movement. The viewer’s eye is drawn first to the stand of snags foremost, which is highlighted starkly by warm morning light. They are skeletal, stripped of leaves, of bark, of any branch that would not bend. They embody death and they are surrounded by life.

The trees are twisted splintering apart at the core as if by some great ravaging storm. The exposed raw wood shines sun-bleached in shades of pale yellow, white, and gray, the only darker pigments used to define shadows cast by light from the upper right side of the painting. Following vibrant trees along the lakeside, and along the bottom of the painting, there is further evidence of a great storm; downed and fallen trees lie by ample water, sunlight, and nutrient rich soil, conditions in which the surrounding trees thrive.

The 27 x 33 3/4 in. dimensions of Lake with Dead Trees make it reminiscent of a picture window offering a portal to the Catskill mountains in southeastern New York State. The painting does not present a specific moment in time, rather it exists. It seems to indicate that within the delicate balance of beauty and life, there is also a strength that will slowly rise and reclaim where ruin has set foot.

As the viewer’s gaze sweeps from the bottom left of the painting, a scene of destruction evokes emotions of loss and regret. Moving up to the right side of the painting and across the sky, sentiments shift with the change in light. From left to right, the sky clears from a ruminating storm to the respite of a clearing sky. On the left of the painting, the dead trees are prominent, as evident by their size and proximity. As the scene moves right, the dead trees become smaller; they decrease in importance, fade, and give way to living trees and new life.

Each of these transitions, from left to right, are smooth, natural motions across realistic spectrums of extremes, until the viewer’s eye is caught and disrupted by the two deer crossing the painting. Captured in the pristine and graceful scene, the deer appeared overly poised, lacking the fluidity found elsewhere. In 1825, an unnamed contemporary viewer noted Cole might easily have omitted the two deer, as they “detracted from [the] foreground.”

== Influence ==
The introduction of Thomas Cole’s works at the emergence of the Hudson River School style gave voice to conservation, an idea that was just beginning to develop. It was at nearly the same time that Lake with Dead Trees was sold, as were the other four paintings, and Thomas Cole’s name was starting to become familiar as a noteworthy artist, that the Erie Canal officially opened across upstate New York. The opening of this major transportation system, second worldwide only to the Grand Canal in China, swept the nation up in a surge of patriotism and celebration of the innovations of this great country. In this outpouring of nationalism, Thomas Cole was wholeheartedly embraced and became championed as the "American Adam of landscape painting.”

Cole is considered to be one of the pioneers of American environmentalism, for his concern for the impending destruction by “Copper-hearted barbarians … pushing a railroad up through his valley to exploit its natural resources – through mining, quarrying, and logging” and in his effort to inform the public, Thomas Cole’s labors are among those that motivated the creation of the National Park Service. Catskill Park was established in 1904 to protect thousands of acres, incredible vistas, and mountain ranges including thirty-three Catskill's high peaks, a natural inheritance that will remain forever wild, an event that without Thomas Cole, and Lake with Dead Trees, likely would not have transpired.

== See also ==
- List of paintings by Thomas Cole
