= The Last of the Mohicans: The Death of Cora =

Painting by Thomas Cole

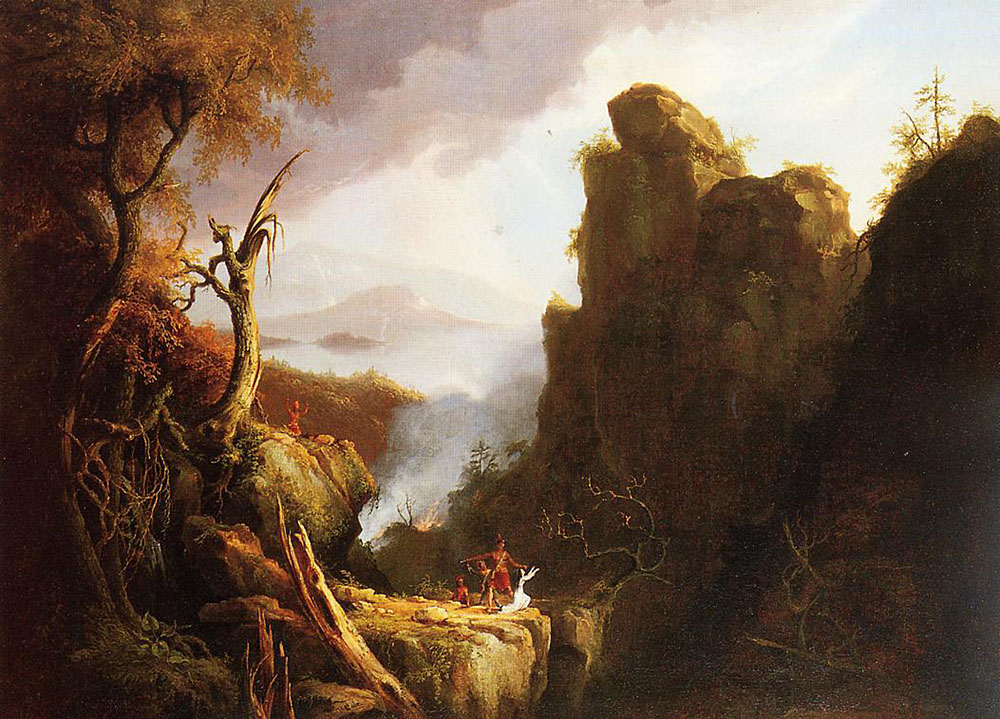
- The Last of the Mohicans: The Death of Cora, c. 1827
- Artist: Thomas Cole
- Year: c. 1827
- Medium: Oil on Canvas
- Location: University of Pennsylvania Art Collection; Philadelphia

The Last of the Mohicans: The Death of Cora, also known as Indian Sacrifice, is a c. 1827 painting by British-American painter Thomas Cole, the founder of the Hudson River School. The painting depicts the death of Cora from the 1826 American novel The Last of the Mohicans. It is one of four such paintings by Cole which depict scenes from the novel. The painting is currently owned by the University of Pennsylvania.

== Artist's background ==
Tom Christopher wrote that "[Thomas] Cole’s greatest artistic asset proved to be his untutored eye." Cole emigrated to America with his family in the spring of 1819 at the age of eighteen. As a child, his surroundings were of Lancashire, England, an area known to be an epicenter of Britain’s primarily industrial region. Because of this, Cole was granted an additional clarity of and sensitivity to the vibrancy of American landscapes awash with color, a stark contrast to the bleak and subdued landscapes of the country he left behind.

== History ==
The painting was first displayed at the National Academy of Design, where Cole included a quotation from the novel in the catalogue:

"Woman," [Magua] said, "choose! The wigwam or the knife of Le Subtil!" Cora regarded him not; but dropping on her knees, with rich glow suffusing itself over her features, she raised her eyes and outstretched arms toward heaven, saying in a meek and yet confiding voice—"I am thine! Do with me as thou seest best!"—But Cora neither heard nor heeded [Magua's] demand. The form of the Huron trembled in every fibre, and he raised his arm on high, but dropped it again, with a wild and bewildered air, like one who doubted. Once more he struggled with himself and lifted his keen weapon again—but a piercing cry was heard from above them, and Uncas appeared, leaping frantically from a fearful height, upon the ledge.

== Analysis ==
The looming nature of the rocks suggests the power of nature. Cole also draws parallels between the Native Americans and the surrounding natural formations.

== See also ==
- List of paintings by Thomas Cole
