= The Dead Abel =

Painting by Thomas Cole

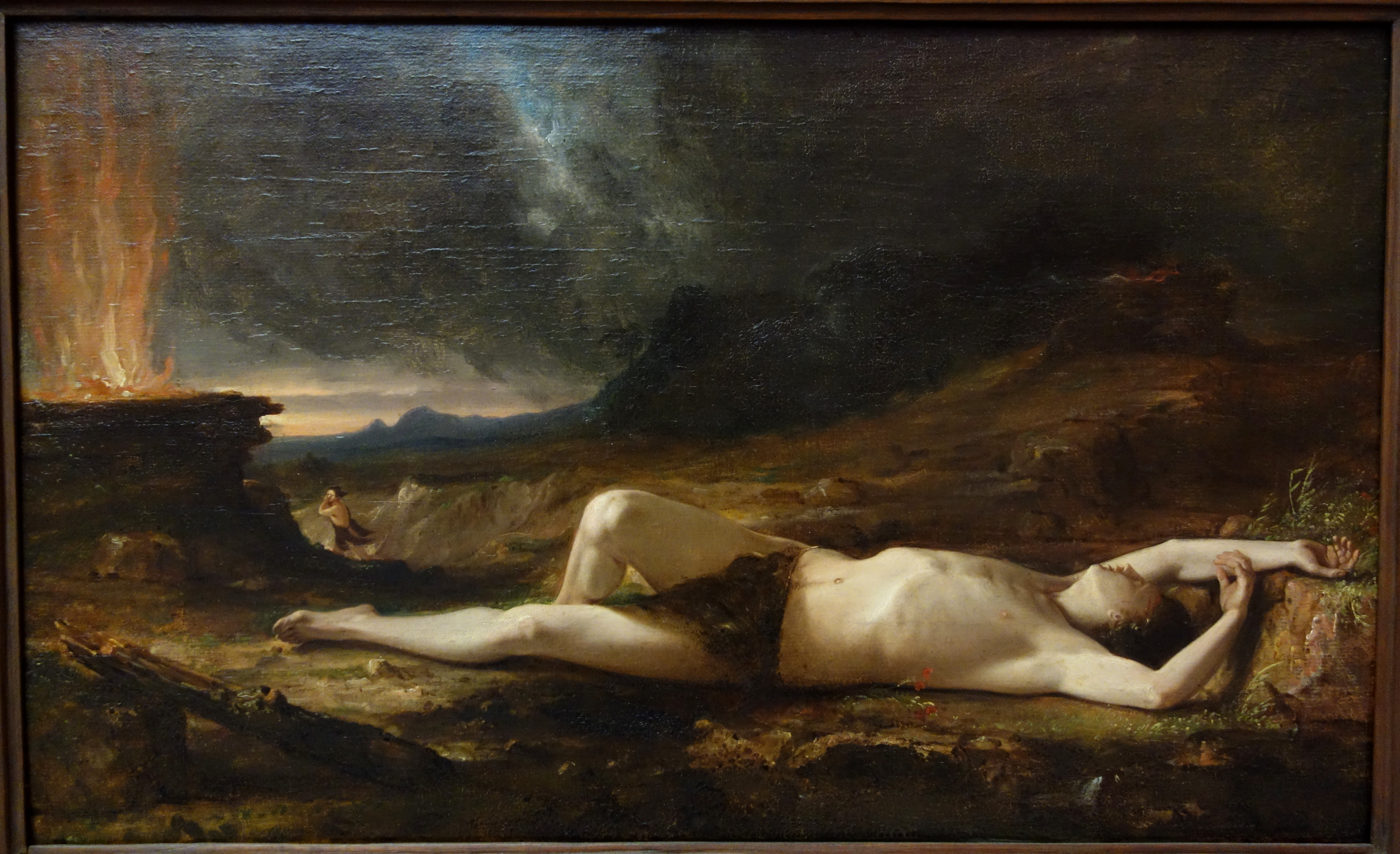
- The Dead Abel, 1832
- Artist: Thomas Cole
- Year: 1832
- Medium: oil on canvas
- Dimensions: 43 cm × 72 cm (17 in × 28.5 in)
- Location: Albany Institute of History & Art; Albany, New York

The Dead Abel is an 1832 oil-on-paper painting by British-American painter Thomas Cole, the founder of the Hudson River School. It depicts the dead biblical figure Abel. It was originally intended to be a study for a larger painting; however, this other work was never created.

== Artist's background ==
Tom Christopher wrote that "[Thomas] Cole’s greatest artistic asset proved to be his untutored eye." Cole emigrated to America with his family in the spring of 1819 at the age of eighteen. As a child, his surroundings were of Lancashire, England, an area known to be an epicenter of Britain’s primarily industrial region. Because of this, Cole was granted an additional clarity of and sensitivity to the vibrancy of American landscapes awash with color, a stark contrast to the bleak and subdued landscapes of the country he left behind. As he aged and recognized his own mortality, Cole transitioned away from natural landscape paintings to focus on works conveying religious and spiritual themes.

== History ==
Cole painted The Dead Abel at the Accademia di San Luca in Florence, Italy. Cole intended the work to be a study for a larger painting which would have depicted Adam and Eve discovering Abel's body. This painting was never made.

== See also ==
- List of paintings by Thomas Cole
