= Arch of Nero (painting) =

Painting by Thomas Cole

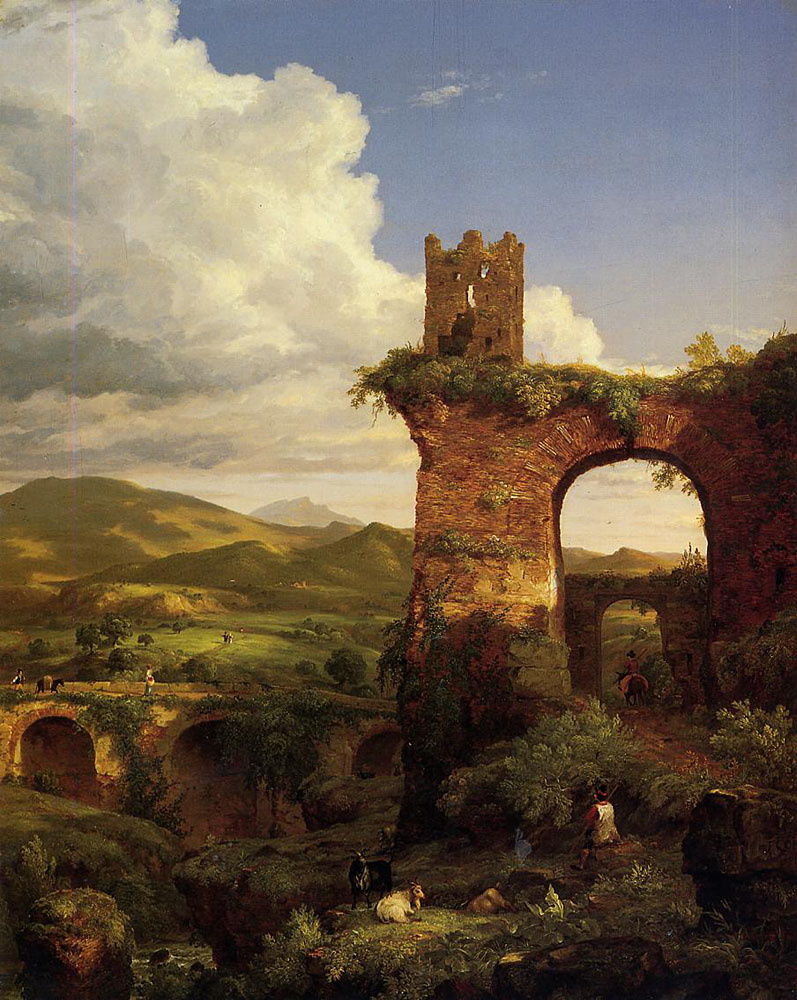
- Arch of Nero, 1846
- Artist: Thomas Cole
- Year: 1846
- Medium: Oil on Canvas
- Dimensions: 153.03 cm × 122.56 cm (60.25 in × 48.25 in)
- Location: Philadelphia Museum of Art, Philadelphia, Pennsylvania

Arch of Nero is an 1846 oil on canvas painting by the American artist Thomas Cole. It was on display at The Newark Museum of Art, but, as of July 2, 2021, was sold to the Philadelphia Museum of Art. The painting was sold on May 19, 2021, for $998,000 plus fees at a Sotheby auction, to a private foundation operated by the Florida-based collectors Thomas H. and Diane DeMell Jacobsen. They bought it "with the idea of keeping it on public view—an idea they promptly followed through on with their loan to the Philadelphia Museum of Art." Seventy "top art curators and scholars" sent an open letter to the Newark Museum of Art stating that the Arch of Nero "is an important and urgent address of America’s republicanism. It speaks to the founding ideal of the American nation, refers to America’s failure to live up to its own ideals, and is a clarion call for America to be the best version of itself.... For northeasterners such as Cole, the prime source of corruption of American republicanism was the Southern slavocracy and its unjust influence within the federal government. Cole made explicit his links between the corruption, decline, and fall of the Roman republic, and America’s present by clothing his figures in red, white, and blue."

== Artist's background ==
Tom Christopher wrote that "[Thomas] Cole’s greatest artistic asset proved to be his untutored eye." Cole emigrated to America with his family in the spring of 1819 at the age of eighteen. As a child, his surroundings were of Lancashire, England, an area known to be an epicenter of Britain’s primarily industrial region. Because of this, Cole was granted an additional clarity of and sensitivity to the vibrancy of American landscapes awash with color, a stark contrast to the bleak and subdued landscapes of the country he left behind. From 1831 to 1832, Cole traversed Italy, where he encountered Roman ruins.

== See also ==
- List of paintings by Thomas Cole
