= View of Fort Putnam =

Painting by Thomas Cole

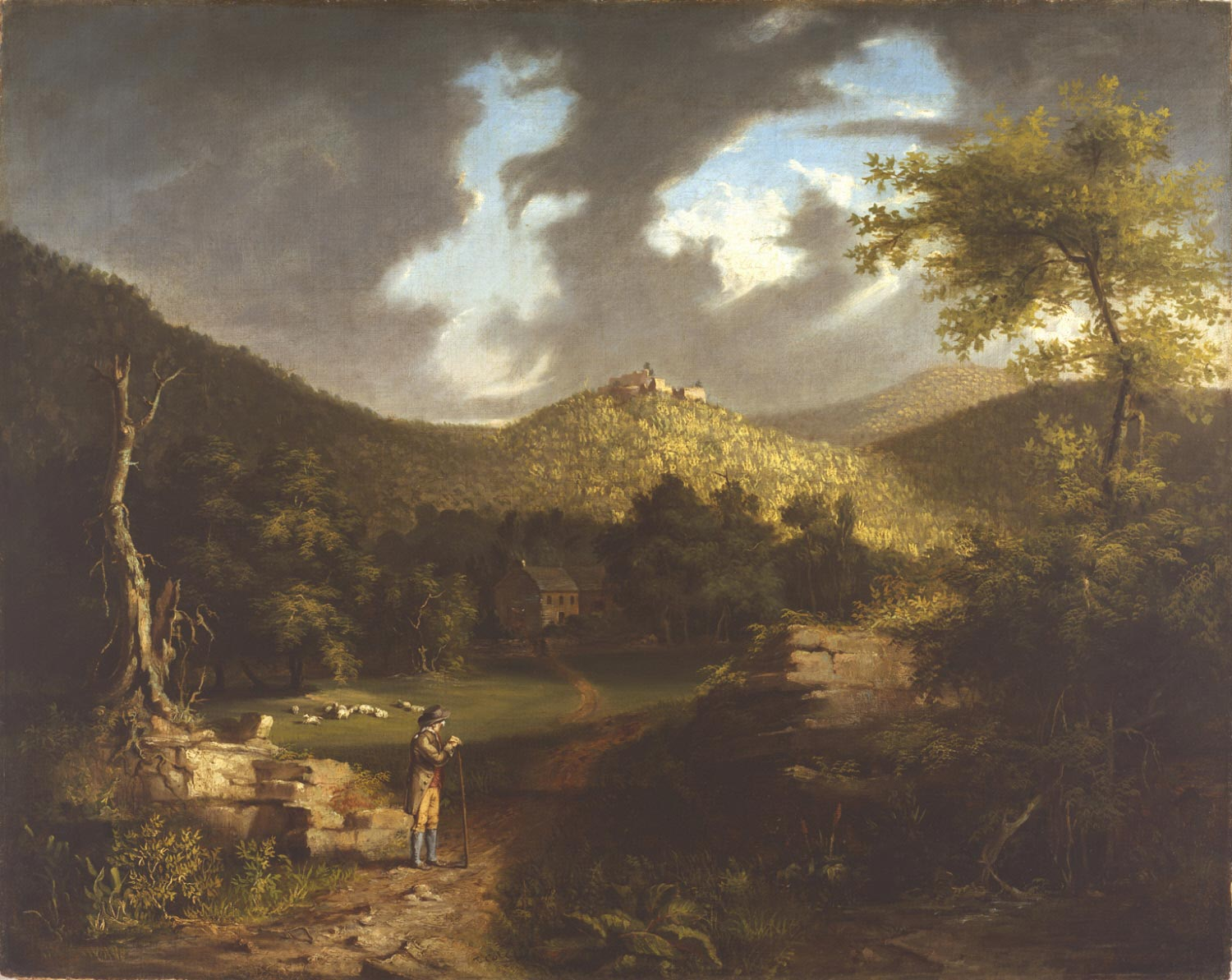
- Artist: Thomas Cole
- Year: 1825
- Medium: Oil on Canvas
- Dimensions: 69.2 cm × 86.4 cm (27.2 in × 34.0 in)
- Location: Philadelphia Museum of Art; Philadelphia, Pennsylvania

View of Fort Putnam is an 1825 oil-on-canvas painting of the Hudson River with a view of Fort Putnam by British-American painter Thomas Cole, who founded the Hudson River School. It is currently owned by the Philadelphia Museum of Art.

== Artist's background ==
Tom Christopher wrote that “[Thomas] Cole’s greatest artistic asset proved to be his untutored eye.” Cole emigrated to America with his family in the spring of 1819 at the age of eighteen. As a child, his surroundings were of Lancashire, England, an area known to be an epicenter of Britain’s primarily industrial region. Because of this, Cole was granted an additional clarity of and sensitivity to the vibrancy of American landscapes awash with color, a stark contrast to the bleak and subdued landscapes of the country he left behind.

== See also ==
- List of paintings by Thomas Cole
