= Sunset, View on the Catskill =

Painting by Thomas Cole

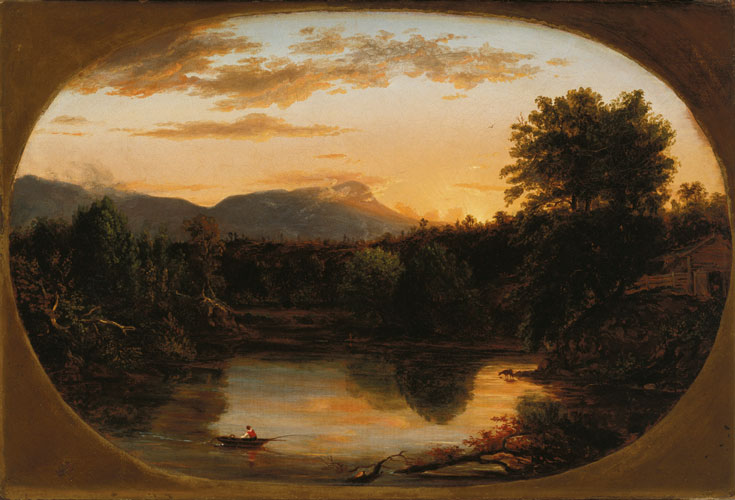
- Artist: Thomas Cole
- Year: 1833
- Medium: Oil on wood
- Dimensions: 41.9 cm × 62.2 cm (16.5 in × 24.5 in)
- Location: New-York Historical Society; New York, New York

Sunset, View on the Catskill is an 1833 oil-on-wood painting by English-born American painter Thomas Cole. It is currently owned by the New-York Historical Society.

== Description ==
The work is in oval format and depicts a view of North Mountain from Catskill Creek.

== Artist's background ==
Tom Christopher wrote that "[Thomas] Cole’s greatest artistic asset proved to be his untutored eye." Cole emigrated to America with his family in the spring of 1819 at the age of eighteen. As a child, his surroundings were of Lancashire, England, an area known to be an epicenter of Britain’s primarily industrial region. Because of this, Cole was granted an additional clarity of and sensitivity to the vibrancy of American landscapes awash with color, a stark contrast to the bleak and subdued landscapes of the country he left behind.

== History ==
Cole created the work for New York merchant Luman Reed. After a trip through Europe, Cole was inspired by 16th-century painter Claude Lorrain. Consequently, the Claudean influence is clearly seen in this painting.

== See also ==
- List of paintings by Thomas Cole
