= List of paintings by Thomas Cole =

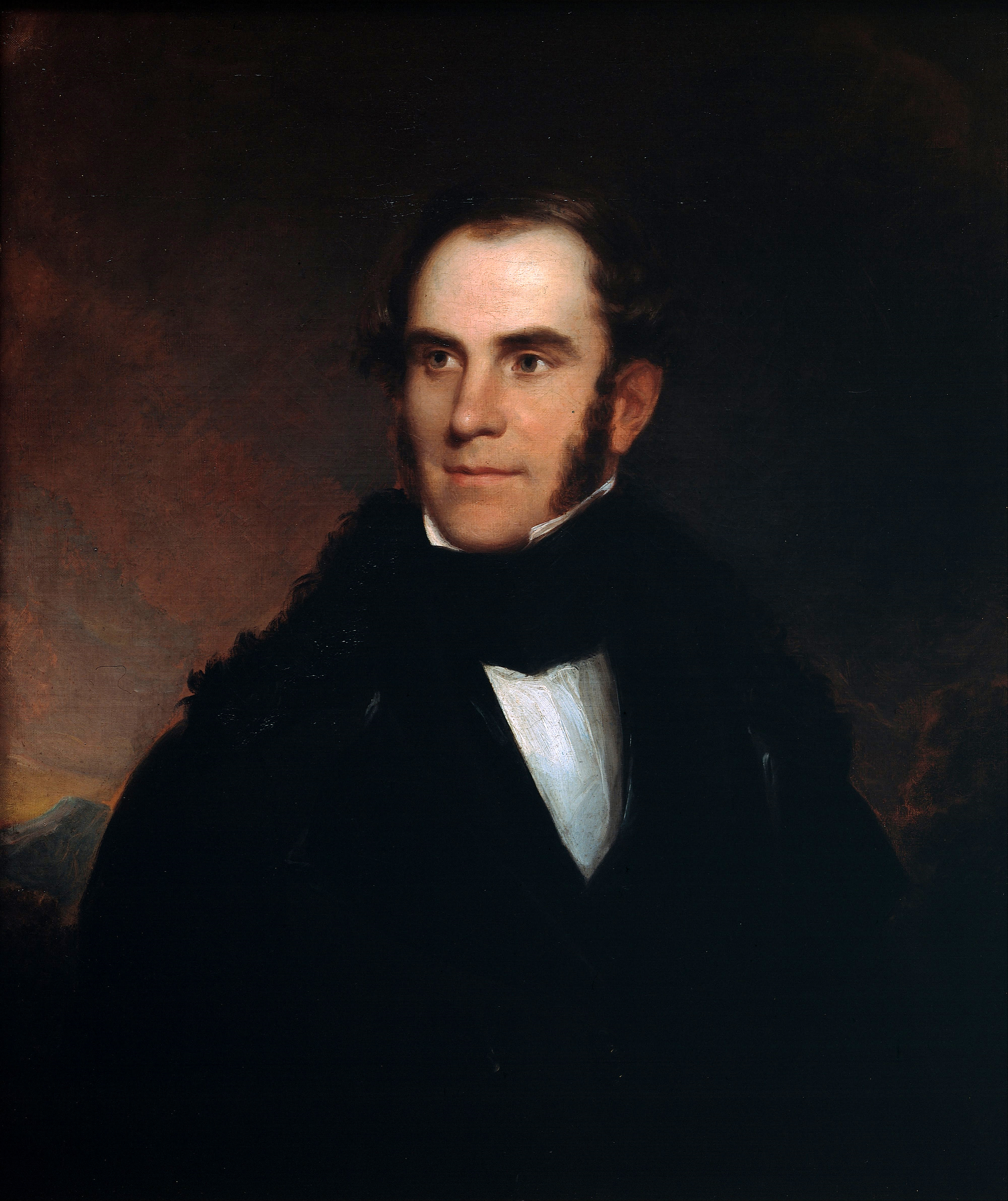
1837 portrait of Cole by fellow Hudson River School painter Asher Brown Durand

Thomas Cole was an American artist who founded the Hudson River School art movement. Cole is widely regarded as the first significant American landscape painter. He was known for his romantic landscape and history paintings. Influenced by European painters, but with a strong American sensibility, he was prolific throughout his career and worked primarily with oil on canvas.

His paintings are typically allegoric and often depict small figures or structures set against moody and evocative natural landscapes. They are usually escapist, framing the New World as a natural eden contrasting with the smog-filled cityscapes of Industrial Revolution-era Britain, in which he grew up. His works, often seen as conservative, criticize the contemporary trends of industrialism, urbanism, and westward expansion.

Self-taught, Cole began painting portraits in 1822. In the ensuing years, he shifted his focus to landscapes. One of Cole's first landscapes, Lake with Dead Trees (1825), was among those that first popularized his works in an 1825 exhibition. Most of his early works depict the wilderness, "the truly American forest", typically the Hudson River Valley and Catskills where he resided. From 1831 to 1832, Cole traversed Italy; some of the classical ruins he visited made appearances in his paintings, such as Aqueduct near Rome (1832), Roman Campagna (1843), and Arch of Nero (1846). While in Rome, Cole formulated the concept for his most ambitious work yet: The Course of Empire, a series of five paintings following the rise and fall of civilization. Completed in 1836, the series reflects nostalgia for pastoralism and Cole's personal opposition to US President Andrew Jackson. His 1836 painting The Oxbow encompasses many of the themes from his earlier landscapes, juxtaposing untamed nature with "civilized" land. Later in life, Cole transitioned away from natural landscapes to focus more on works conveying religious or spiritual themes. In 1842, he painted The Voyage of Life, another allegorical series, this time depicting the course of an individual's life. His 1847 painting Prometheus Bound, based on the Greek myth, is believed by some analysts to express abolitionist sentiments. One of Cole's final landscapes, Cross at Sunset, was left unfinished after his premature death in 1848.

Today, Cole's work are held across a wide variety of major and national museums, with the Metropolitan Museum of Art, Museum of Fine Arts, Boston, and the National Gallery of Art having some of the largest collections. The following list consists only of paintings documented in public collections.

== Paintings ==
=== Dated works ===
Table featuring paintings by Thomas Cole
Image	Title	Year	Medium	Dimensions	Collection	Ref.
	Lake with Dead Trees (Note: Also known as Catskill)	1825	Oil on canvas	68.6 by 85.7 centimetres (27.0 in × 33.7 in)	Allen Memorial Art Museum, Ohio	
	View of Fort Putnam	1825	Oil on canvas	69.2 by 86.4 centimetres (27.2 in × 34.0 in)	Philadelphia Museum of Art, Pennsylvania	
	Landscape	1825	Oil on canvas	60.3 by 80 centimetres (23.7 in × 31.5 in)	Minneapolis Institute of Art, Minnesota	
	Catskills Mountain Landscape	c. 1826	Oil on wood	40.3 by 55.6 centimetres (15.9 in × 21.9 in)	Sheldon Museum of Art, Nebraska	
	The Tempest	c. 1826	Oil on panel	47.6 by 63.5 centimetres (18.7 in × 25.0 in)	High Museum of Art, Georgia	
	Kaaterskill Falls	1826	Oil on canvas	64.2 by 89.7 centimetres (25.3 in × 35.3 in)	Wadsworth Atheneum, Connecticut	
	Sunrise in the Catskills	1826	Oil on canvas	64.8 by 90.1 centimetres (25.5 in × 35.5 in)	National Gallery of Art, Washington, D.C.	
	Landscape, the Seat of Mr. Featherstonhaugh in the Distance	1826	Oil on canvas	83.8 by 121.9 centimetres (33.0 in × 48.0 in)	Philadelphia Museum of Art, Pennsylvania	
	View on the Schoharie	1826	Oil on canvas	92.7 by 117.5 centimetres (36.5 in × 46.3 in)	Fenimore Art Museum, New York	
	Daniel Boone Sitting At the Door of His Cabin on the Great Osage Lake Kentucky	1826	Oil on canvas	97.2 by 108.3 centimetres (38.3 in × 42.6 in)	Mead Art Museum, Massachusetts	
	From the Top of Kaaterskill Falls	1826	Oil on canvas	79.1 by 104.5 centimetres (31.1 in × 41.1 in)	Detroit Institute of Arts, Michigan	
	The Woodchopper, Lake Featherstonhaugh	1826	Oil on panel	68.6 by 86.4 centimetres (27.0 in × 34.0 in)	USC Fisher Museum of Art, California	
	The Last of the Mohicans: The Death of Cora	c. 1827	Oil on canvas	Unknown	University of Pennsylvania, Pennsylvania	
	Peace at Sunset (Note: Also known as Evening in the White Mountains)	c. 1827	Oil on canvas	68.9 by 81.9 centimetres (27.1 in × 32.2 in)	Fine Arts Museums of San Francisco, California	
	Scene from "The Last of the Mohicans," Cora Kneeling at the Feet of Tamenund	1827	Oil on canvas	64.5 by 89.1 centimetres (25.4 in × 35.1 in)	Metropolitan Museum of Art, New York	
	The Clove, Catskills	1827	Oil on canvas	64.1 by 89.2 centimetres (25.2 in × 35.1 in)	New Britain Museum of American Art, Connecticut	
	View of the Round-Top in the Catskill Mountains	1827	Oil on panel	47.3 by 64.5 centimetres (18.6 in × 25.4 in)	Museum of Fine Arts, Boston, Massachusetts	
	View in the White Mountains	1827	Oil on canvas	64.5 by 89.4 centimetres (25.4 in × 35.2 in)	Wadsworth Atheneum, Connecticut	
	Autumn in the Catskills	1827	Oil on wood	47.3 by 64.6 centimetres (18.6 in × 25.4 in)	Arnot Art Museum, New York	
	View near the Village of Catskill	1827	Oil on panel	62.2 by 88.9 centimetres (24.5 in × 35.0 in)	Fine Arts Museums of San Francisco, California	
	Landscape Composition: Saint John in the Wilderness	1827	Oil on canvas	91.4 by 73.5 centimetres (36.0 in × 28.9 in)	Wadsworth Atheneum, Connecticut	
	Lake Winnepesaukee	c. 1827 – c. 1828	Oil on canvas	64.8 by 87 centimetres (25.5 in × 34.3 in)	Albany Institute of History & Art, New York	
	Expulsion: Moon and Firelight	c. 1828	Oil on canvas	91.4 by 122 centimetres (36.0 in × 48.0 in)	Thyssen-Bornemisza Museum, Madrid	
	Expulsion from the Garden of Eden	1828	Oil on canvas	101 by 138.4 centimetres (39.8 in × 54.5 in)	Museum of Fine Arts, Boston, Massachusetts	
	Landscape (Landscape with Tree Trunks)	1828	Oil on canvas	66.4 by 81.9 centimetres (26.1 in × 32.2 in)	Rhode Island School of Design Museum of Art, Rhode Island	
	The Garden of Eden	1828	Oil on canvas	38.5 by 52.8 centimetres (15.2 in × 20.8 in)	Amon Carter Museum of American Art, Texas	
	View on Lake Winnipiseogee	1828	Oil on panel	50.2 by 66.4 centimetres (19.8 in × 26.1 in)	Wadsworth Atheneum, Connecticut	
	The Subsiding of the Waters of the Deluge	1829	Oil on canvas	90.8 by 121.3 centimetres (35.7 in × 47.8 in)	Smithsonian American Art Museum, Washington, D.C.	
	Distant View of Niagara Falls	1830	Oil on panel	47.9 by 60.6 centimetres (18.9 in × 23.9 in)	Art Institute of Chicago, Illinois	
	Tornado in an American Forest (Note: Also called A Tornado in the Wilderness)	1831	Oil on canvas	117.8 by 164.2 centimetres (46.4 in × 64.6 in)	National Gallery of Art, Washington, D.C.	
	A Wild Scene	c. 1831 – c. 1832	Oil on canvas	129.7 by 194.5 centimetres (51.1 in × 76.6 in)	Baltimore Museum of Art, Maryland	
	Aqueduct near Rome	1832	Oil on canvas	44.5 by 67.3 centimetres (17.5 in × 26.5 in)	Mildred Lane Kemper Art Museum, Missouri	
	The Dead Abel (Note: The work was originally intended to have been a study for a larger work.)	1832	Oil on panel	17 by 28.5 centimetres (6.7 in × 11.2 in)	Albany Institute of History & Art, New York	
	Ruined Tower (Mediterranean Coast Scene with Tower)	c. 1832 – c. 1836	Oil on composition board	68 by 86.4 centimetres (26.8 in × 34.0 in)	Albany Institute of History & Art, New York	
	Ruined Castle and River	c. 1832	Oil on canvas	20.2 by 31.7 centimetres (8.0 in × 12.5 in)	Brooklyn Museum, New York	
	The Cascatelli, Tivoli, Looking Towards Rome	c. 1832	Oil on canvas	85.7 by 113 centimetres (33.7 in × 44.5 in)	Columbus Museum of Art, Ohio	
	A View near Tivoli (Morning)	1832	Oil on canvas	37.5 by 58.7 centimetres (14.8 in × 23.1 in)	Metropolitan Museum of Art, New York	
	Salvator Rosa Sketching Banditti	c. 1832 – c. 1840	Oil on panel	17.8 by 24.1 centimetres (7.0 in × 9.5 in)	Museum of Fine Arts, Boston, Massachusetts	
	Catskill Scenery	c. 1833	Oil on canvas	62.2 by 82.2 centimetres (24.5 in × 32.4 in)	Saint Louis Art Museum, Missouri	
	Sunset, View on the Catskill	1833	Oil on wood	41.9 by 62.2 centimetres (16.5 in × 24.5 in)	New-York Historical Society, New York	
	The Titan's Goblet	1833	Oil on canvas	49.2 by 41 centimetres (19.4 in × 16.1 in)	Metropolitan Museum of Art, New York	
	Scene from Byron’s “Manfred”	1833	Oil on canvas	127 by 96.5 centimetres (50.0 in × 38.0 in)	Yale University Art Gallery, Connecticut	
	Landscape (Moonlight)	c. 1833 – c. 1834	Oil on canvas	62.5 by 80.6 centimetres (24.6 in × 31.7 in)	New-York Historical Society, New York	
	The Course of Empire: Destruction	c. 1833 – c. 1836	Oil on canvas	100.3 by 161.3 centimetres (39.5 in × 63.5 in)	New-York Historical Society, New York	
	The Angel Appearing to the Shepherds	c. 1834 – c. 1834	Oil on canvas	101.5 by 185.5 centimetres (40.0 in × 73.0 in)	Chrysler Museum of Art, Virginia	
	Autumn Twilight, View of Conway Peak (Mount Chocorua), New Hampshire	1834	Oil on wood	34.9 by 49.5 centimetres (13.7 in × 19.5 in)	New-York Historical Society, New York	
	Summer Twilight, A Recollection of a Scene in New-England	1834	Oil on wood	35.6 by 49.5 centimetres (14.0 in × 19.5 in)	New-York Historical Society, New York	
	Clouds	c. 1838	Oil on paper laid down on canvas	22.2 by 27.6 centimetres (8.7 in × 10.9 in)	Metropolitan Museum of Art, New York	
	Self-Portrait	c. 1836	Oil on canvas	55.9 by 45.7 centimetres (22.0 in × 18.0 in)	New-York Historical Society, New York	
	The Oxbow (Note: Also known as View from Mount Holyoke, Northampton, Massachusetts, after a Thunderstorm)	1836	Oil on canvas	130.8 by 193 centimetres (51.5 in × 76.0 in)	Metropolitan Museum of Art, New York	
	The Course of Empire: The Savage State	c. 1833 – c. 1836	Oil on canvas	99.7 by 160.7 centimetres (39.3 in × 63.3 in)	New-York Historical Society, New York	
	The Course of Empire: The Arcadian or Pastoral State	c. 1834	Oil on canvas	99.7 by 160.7 centimetres (39.3 in × 63.3 in)	New-York Historical Society, New York	
	The Course of Empire: Consummation	c. 1835 – c. 1836	Oil on canvas (relined)	130.2 by 193 centimetres (51.3 in × 76.0 in)	New-York Historical Society, New York	
	The Course of Empire: Desolation	1836	Oil on canvas (relined)	99.7 by 160.7 centimetres (39.3 in × 63.3 in)	New-York Historical Society, New York	
	View on the Catskill Early Autumn	c. 1836 – c. 1837	Oil on canvas	99.1 by 160 centimetres (39.0 in × 63.0 in)	Metropolitan Museum of Art, New York	
	View of Florence from San Miniato	1837	Oil on canvas	125.4 by 186.7 centimetres (49.4 in × 73.5 in)	Cleveland Museum of Art, Ohio	
	The Departure	1837	Oil on canvas	100.3 by 161.6 centimetres (39.5 in × 63.6 in)	National Gallery of Art, Washington, D.C.	
	The Return	1837	Oil on canvas	100.3 by 161.4 centimetres (39.5 in × 63.5 in)	National Gallery of Art, Washington, D.C.	
	View on the Arno, near Florence	1837	Oil on canvas	84.5 by 135.5 centimetres (33.3 in × 53.3 in)	Worcester Art Museum, Massachusetts	
	The Vesper Hymn	c. 1838	Oil on canvas	53.7 by 45.4 centimetres (21.1 in × 17.9 in)	Yale University Art Gallery, Connecticut	
	Dream of Arcadia	c. 1838	Oil on canvas	98.1 by 159.4 centimetres (38.6 in × 62.8 in)	Denver Art Museum, Colorado	
	Romantic Landscape with Ruined Tower	1838	Oil on canvas	86.4 by 116.8 centimetres (34.0 in × 46.0 in)	National Gallery of Art, Washington, D.C.	
	View of Schroon Mountain, Essex County, New York, After a Storm	1838	Oil on canvas	99.8 by 160.5 centimetres (39.3 in × 63.2 in)	The Cleveland Museum of Art, Ohio	
	The Present	1838	Oil on canvas	103.5 by 156.5 centimetres (40.7 in × 61.6 in)	Mead Art Museum, Massachusetts	
	The Past	1838	Oil on canvas	102.9 by 153.7 centimetres (40.5 in × 60.5 in)	Mead Art Museum, Massachusetts	
	North Mountain and Catskill Creek	1838	Oil on canvas	67.2 by 92.6 centimetres (26.5 in × 36.5 in)	Yale University Art Gallery, Connecticut	
	The Notch of the White Mountains	1839	Oil on canvas	102 by 155.8 centimetres (40.2 in × 61.3 in)	National Gallery of Art, Washington, D.C.	
	New England Scenery	1839	Oil on canvas	57.1 by 46.7 centimetres (22.5 in × 18.4 in)	Art Institute of Chicago, Illinois	
	Gardens of the Van Rensselaer Manor House	1840	Oil on canvas	61 by 91 centimetres (24 in × 36 in)	Albany Institute of History & Art, New York	
	The Architect's Dream	1840	Oil on canvas	134.7 by 213.6 centimetres (53.0 in × 84.1 in)	Toledo Museum of Art, Ohio	
	The Fountain of Vaucluse	1841	Oil on canvas	175.3 by 124.8 centimetres (69.0 in × 49.1 in)	Dallas Museum of Art, Texas	
	Sunset in the Catskills	1841	Oil on canvas	57.2 by 76.2 centimetres (22.5 in × 30.0 in)	Museum of Fine Arts, Boston, Massachusetts	
	The Return from the Tournament	1841	Oil on canvas	101 by 153.7 centimetres (39.8 in × 60.5 in)	National Gallery of Art, Washington, D.C.	
	Mill Dam on the Catskill Creek	1841	Oil on canvas	56.5 by 76.2 centimetres (22.2 in × 30.0 in)	Currier Museum of Art, New Hampshire	
	The Temple of Segesta with the Artist Sketching	c. 1842	Oil on canvas	49.9 by 76.5 centimetres (19.6 in × 30.1 in)	Museum of Fine Arts, Boston, Massachusetts	
	The Voyage of Life: Childhood	1842	Oil on canvas	134.3 by 195.3 centimetres (52.9 in × 76.9 in)	National Gallery of Art, Washington, D.C.	
	The Voyage of Life: Youth	1842	Oil on canvas	134.3 by 194.9 centimetres (52.9 in × 76.7 in)	National Gallery of Art, Washington, D.C.	
	The Voyage of Life: Manhood	1842	Oil on canvas	134.3 by 202.6 centimetres (52.9 in × 79.8 in)	National Gallery of Art, Washington, D.C.	
	The Voyage of Life: Old Age	1842	Oil on canvas	133.4 by 196.2 centimetres (52.5 in × 77.2 in)	National Gallery of Art, Washington, D.C.	
	View of Sicily	c. 1842 – c. 1845	Oil on wood panel	18.6 by 25.7 centimetres (7.3 in × 10.1 in)18.6 x 25.7 cm	Pennsylvania Academy of the Fine Arts, Pennsylvania	
	River in the Catskills	1843	Oil on canvas	69.9 by 102.6 centimetres (27.5 in × 40.4 in)	Museum of Fine Arts Boston, Massachusetts	
	Angels Ministering to Christ in the Wilderness	1843	Oil on linen	189.2 by 152.4 centimetres (74.5 in × 60.0 in)	Worcester Art Museum, Massachusetts	
	Roman Campagna (Note: Also called Ruins of Aqueducts in the Campagna Di Roma)	1843	Oil on canvas	82.6 by 106.7 centimetres (32.5 in × 42.0 in)	Wadsworth Atheneum, Connecticut	
	Mount Etna from Taormina, Sicily	1843	Oil on canvas	200 by 306 centimetres (79 in × 120 in)	Wadsworth Atheneum, Connecticut	
	An Italian Autumn	1844	Oil on canvas	81.6 by 123.2 centimetres (32.1 in × 48.5 in)	Museum of Fine Arts, Boston, Massachusetts	
	A View of the Two Lakes and Mountain House, Catskill Mountains, Morning	1844	Oil on canvas	91 by 136.9 centimetres (35.8 in × 53.9 in)	Brooklyn Museum, New York	
	American Lake Scene	1844	Oil on canvas	46.4 by 62.2 centimetres (18.3 in × 24.5 in)	Detroit Institute of Arts, Michigan	
	The Mill, Sunset	1844	Oil on canvas	66.4 by 91.6 centimetres (26.1 in × 36.1 in)	Nelson-Atkins Museum of Art, Missouri	
	View of the Thames	1845	Oil on panel	34 by 51.4 centimetres (13.4 in × 20.2 in)	Museum of Fine Arts, Boston, Massachusetts	
	Il Penseroso	1845	Oil on canvas	82.2 by 122.1 centimetres (32.4 in × 48.1 in)	Los Angeles County Museum of Art, California	
	The Cross in the Wilderness	1845	Unknown	61 by 61 centimetres (24 in × 24 in)	Louvre, Paris	
	Catskill Creek	1845	Oil on canvas	67.3 by 91.4 centimetres (26.5 in × 36.0 in)	New-York Historical Society, New York	
	View across Frenchman's Bay from Mt. Desert Island, after a Squall	1845	Oil on canvas	97.3 by 159 centimetres (38.3 in × 62.6 in)	Cincinnati Art Museum, Ohio	
	L'Allegro	1845	Oil on canvas	81.6 by 121.9 centimetres (32.1 in × 48.0 in)	Los Angeles County Museum of Art, California	
	The Hunter's Return	1845	Oil on canvas	101.9 by 153.7 centimetres (40.1 in × 60.5 in)	Amon Carter Museum of American Art, Texas	
	A Pic-Nic Party	1846	Oil on canvas	121.6 by 137.2 centimetres (47.9 in × 54.0 in)	Brooklyn Museum, New York	
	Arch of Nero	1846	Oil on canvas	153 by 122.6 centimetres (60.2 in × 48.3 in)	Philadelphia Museum of Art, Pennsylvania	
	The Mountain Ford	1846	Oil on canvas	71.8 by 101.8 centimetres (28.3 in × 40.1 in)	Metropolitan Museum of Art, New York	
	The Cross and the World: The Pilgrim of the Cross at the End of His Journey	c. 1846 – c. 1848	Oil on canvas	30.5 by 45.7 centimetres (12.0 in × 18.0 in)	Smithsonian American Art Museum, Washington, D.C.	
	Indian Pass (Essex County, New York)	1847	Oil on canvas	101.8 by 75.6 centimetres (40.1 in × 29.8 in)	Museum of Fine Arts, Houston, Texas	
	Prometheus Bound	1847	Oil on canvas	243.8 by 162.6 centimetres (96.0 in × 64.0 in)	Fine Arts Museums of San Francisco, California	
	Genesee Scenery	1847	Oil on canvas	130.8 by 99.7 centimetres (51.5 in × 39.3 in)	Rhode Island School of Design Museum of Art, Rhode Island	
	Home in the Woods	1847	Oil on canvas	168 by 112.7 centimetres (66.1 in × 44.4 in)	Reynolda House Museum of American Art, North Carolina	
	The Good Shepherd	1848	Oil on canvas	81.3 by 121.9 centimetres (32.0 in × 48.0 in)	Crystal Bridges Museum of American Art, Arkansas	
	Cross at Sunset	c. 1848	Oil on canvas	81.8 by 122.4 centimetres (32.2 in × 48.2 in)	Thyssen-Bornemisza Museum, Madrid	

=== Undated works ===
Table featuring paintings by Thomas Cole
Image	Title	Medium	Dimensions	Collection	Ref.
	Italian Landscape (formerly The Catskills from Saugerties)	Oil on board	13.3 by 23.5 centimetres (5.2 in × 9.3 in)	Fralin Museum of Art, Virginia	
	Dead Rising from Tombs	Oil on thin wood board	19 by 27.5 centimetres (7.5 in × 10.8 in)	Princeton University Art Museum, New Jersey	
	Italian Ruins, unfinished	Oil on board	24.1 by 31.8 centimetres (9.5 in × 12.5 in)	Thomas Cole National Historic Site, New York	
	Landscape, Sunrise in the Clove	Oil on canvas	14 by 21.6 centimetres (5.5 in × 8.5 in)	Thomas Cole National Historic Site, New York	

== Preparative works ==
Table featuring paintings by Thomas Cole
Image	Title	Year	Medium	Dimensions	Collection	Ref.
	Study for The Angel Appearing to the Shepherds	1831	Oil on board	17.8 by 22.2 centimetres (7.0 in × 8.7 in)	Chrysler Museum of Art, Virginia	
	Study for the Savage State	c. 1834	Oil on canvas	18.7 by 26 centimetres (7.4 in × 10.2 in)	Princeton University Art Museum, New Jersey	
	Sketch for The Oxbow	1836	Oil and pencil on composition board	14 by 23.8 centimetres (5.5 in × 9.4 in)	Metropolitan Museum of Art, New York	
	Study for The Voyage of Life: Manhood	c. 1837 – c. 1839	Oil on wooden panel	30.5 by 34.6 centimetres (12.0 in × 13.6 in)	Albany Institute of History & Art, New York	
	Study for The Voyage of Life: Old Age	c. 1837 – c. 1839	Oil on wooden panel	30.5 by 34.8 centimetres (12.0 in × 13.7 in)	Albany Institute of History & Art, New York	
	Figure Study for The Voyage of Life: Youth	c. 1839 – c. 1840	Oil and graphite on canvas	64.1 by 52.7 centimetres (25.2 in × 20.7 in)	Munson-Williams-Proctor Arts Institute, New York	
	Figure Study for The Voyage of Life: Manhood	c. 1839 – c. 1840	Oil on diagonal weave canvas	26.7 by 20.5 centimetres (10.5 in × 8.1 in)	Munson-Williams-Proctor Arts Institute, New York	
	Compositional Study for The Voyage of Life: Manhood	c. 1840	Oil on academy board	31.1 by 43.7 centimetres (12.2 in × 17.2 in)	Smith College Museum of Art, Massachusetts	
	Study for Catskill Creek	c. 1844 – c. 1845	Oil on panel	30.5 by 45.7 centimetres (12.0 in × 18.0 in)	National Gallery of Art, Washington, D.C.	
	Study for The Cross and the World	c. 1846 – c. 1847	Oil on panel	30.1 by 46.2 centimetres (11.9 in × 18.2 in)	Brooklyn Museum, New York	
	Study for The Cross and the World: The Pilgrim of the World on his Journey	c. 1846 – c. 1847	Oil on canvas	30 by 46 centimetres (12 in × 18 in)	Albany Institute of History & Art, New York	
	Study for The Pilgrim of the World at the End of His Journey	c. 1847	Oil on canvas	30.5 by 45.7 centimetres (12.0 in × 18.0 in)	Smithsonian American Art Museum, Washington, D.C.	

== See also ==
- List of paintings by Frederic Edwin Church
- List of works by Albert Bierstadt
