= View of Florence from San Miniato =

1837 painting by Thomas Cole

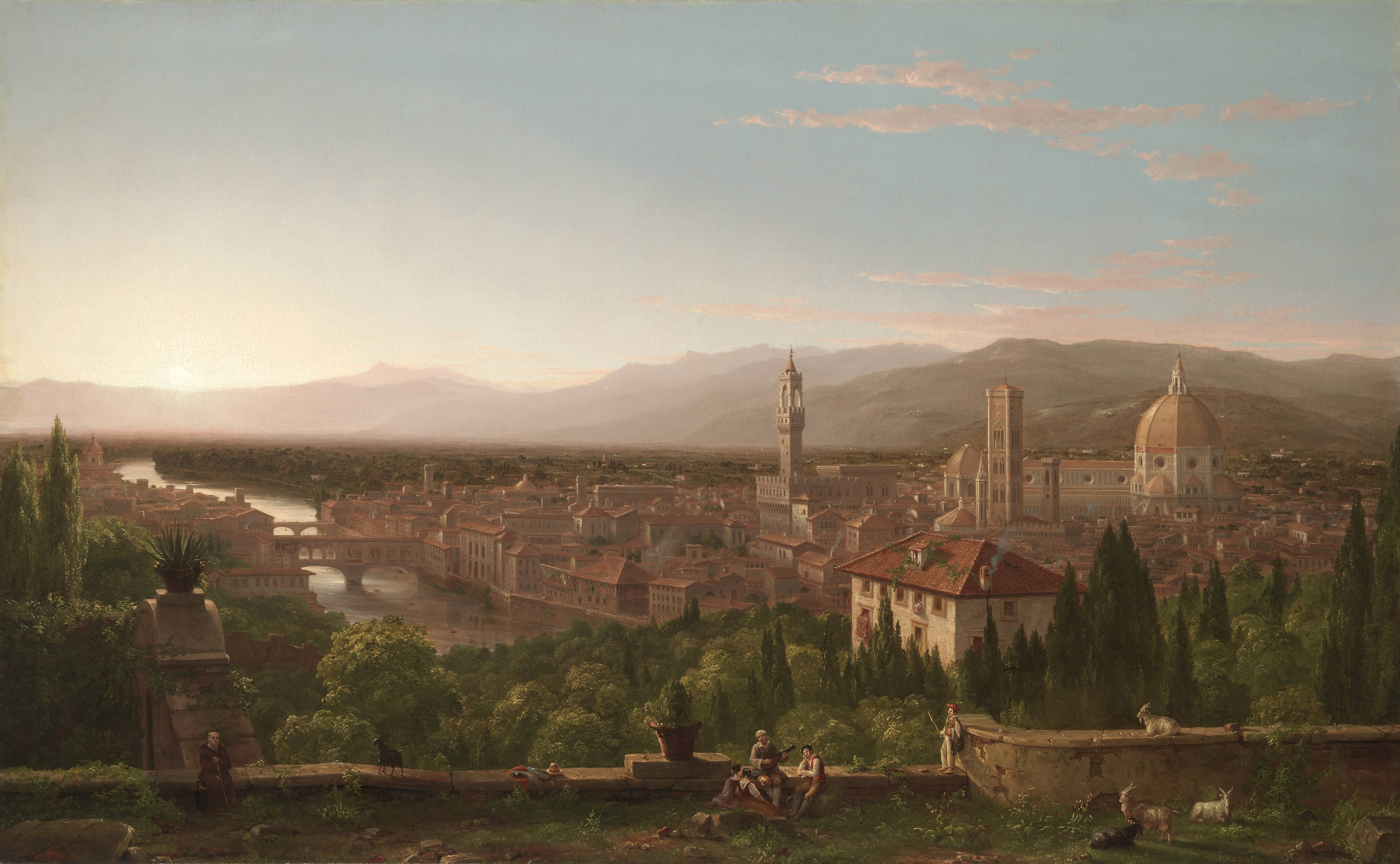
- Artist: Thomas Cole
- Year: 1837
- Medium: Oil on canvas
- Location: Cleveland Museum of Art, Cleveland

View of Florence from San Miniato is an oil on canvas painting by American artist Thomas Cole.

== History ==
It was completed in 1837 and is currently housed at Cleveland Museum of Art.

== Description ==
The painting is a panorama of Florence, showing a Romantic response to the Italian landscape.

== See also ==
- List of paintings by Thomas Cole
