= Summer Twilight, A Recollection of a Scene in New-England =

Painting by Thomas Cole

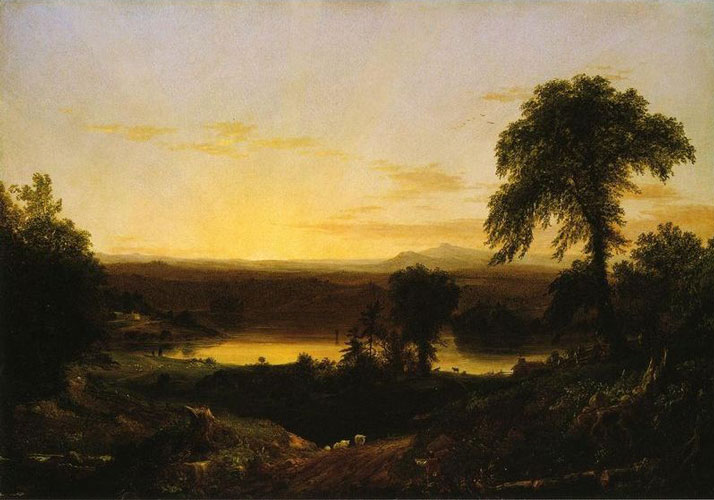
- Artist: Thomas Cole
- Year: 1834
- Medium: Oil on wood
- Dimensions: 35.6 cm × 49.5 cm (14 in × 19.5 in)
- Location: New-York Historical Society; New York, New York

Summer Twilight, A Recollection of a Scene in New-England is an 1834 oil-on-wood painting by British-born American painter Thomas Cole, the founder of the Hudson River School. It is currently owned by the New-York Historical Society.

== Description and analysis ==
The painting depicts a pastoral setting in New England. However, the axe-hewn stump in the foreground foreshadows the arrival of European civilization.

== Artist's background ==
Tom Christopher wrote that “[Thomas] Cole’s greatest artistic asset proved to be his untutored eye.” Cole emigrated to America with his family in the spring of 1819 at the age of eighteen. As a child, his surroundings were of Lancashire, England, an area known to be an epicenter of Britain’s primarily industrial region. Because of this, Cole was granted an additional clarity of and sensitivity to the vibrancy of American landscapes awash with color, a stark contrast to the bleak and subdued landscapes of the country he left behind.

== History ==
Cole painted this work during the early stages of creating his painting series The Course of Empire. This work was also created in tandem with the similar painting Autumn Twilight, View of Conway Peak, New Hampshire.

== See also ==
- List of paintings by Thomas Cole
