= The Fountain of Vaucluse =

Painting by Thomas Cole

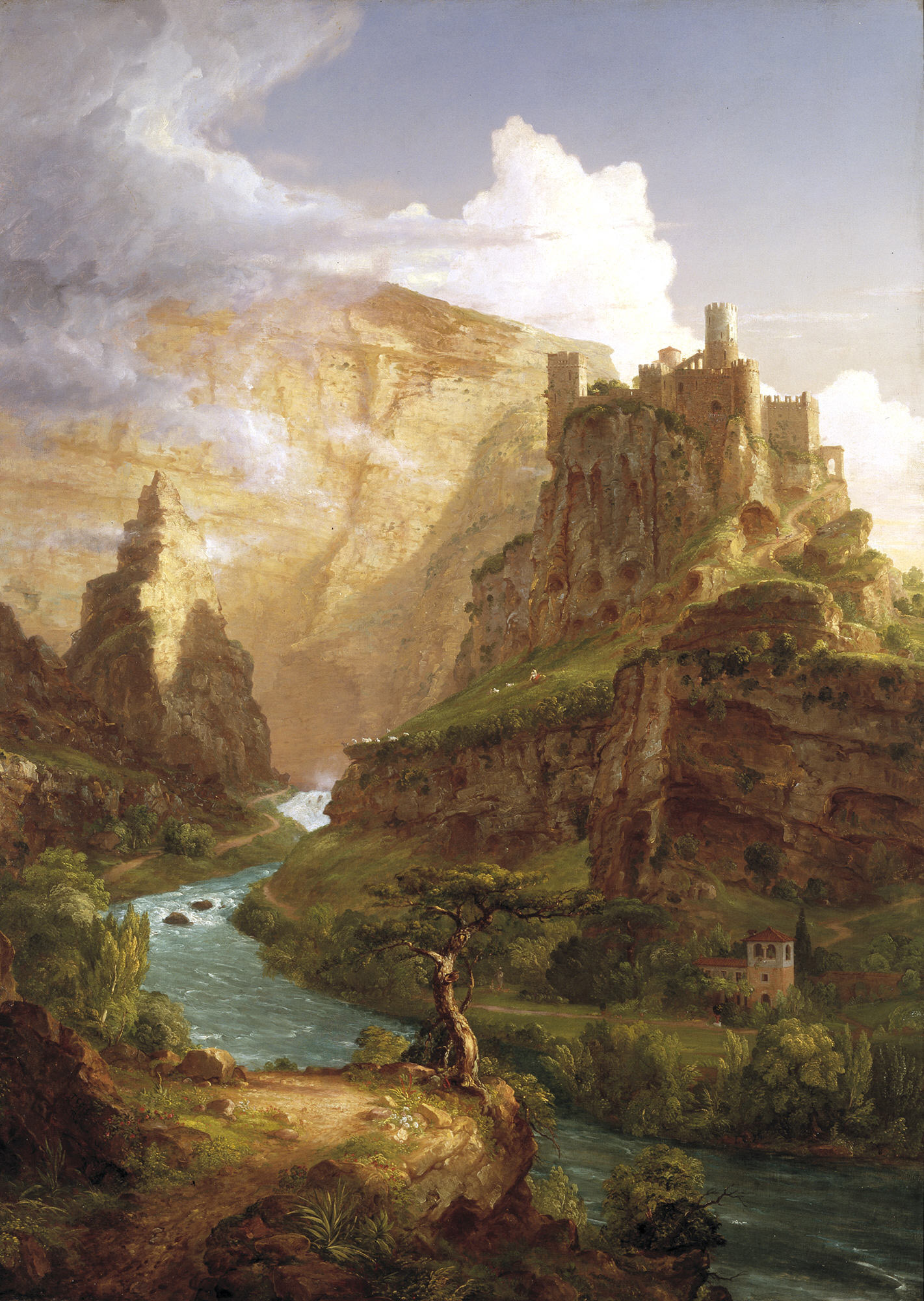
- The Fountain of Vaucluse, 1841
- Artist: Thomas Cole
- Year: 1841
- Medium: Oil on Canvas
- Dimensions: 175.26 cm × 124.78 cm (69 in × 49.125 in)
- Location: Dallas Museum of Art; Dallas, Texas

The Fountain of Vaucluse is an 1841 oil on canvas painting by British-American painter Thomas Cole, founder of the Hudson River School. The work depicts the former home of Petrarch in Fontaine-de-Vaucluse, France.

== Context ==
Tom Christopher wrote that “[Thomas] Cole’s greatest artistic asset proved to be his untutored eye.” Cole emigrated to America with his family in the spring of 1819 at the age of eighteen. As a child, his surroundings were of Lancashire, England, an area known to be an epicenter of Britain’s primarily industrial region. Because of this, Cole was granted an additional clarity of and sensitivity to the vibrancy of American landscapes awash with color, a stark contrast to the bleak and subdued landscapes of the country he left behind. From 1831 to 1832, Cole traversed Italy, where he encountered ruins.

The source of the Sorge is France's largest source of underground water, and its depth has never been fully explored to this day. Starting in 1339, the poet Petrarch regularly visited the Sorge's source:

Ici, j’ai fait ma Rome, ma Athènes, ma patrie.

[Here, I built my Rome, my Athens, my homeland.]

— Petrarch

The quality of the Vaucluse's water was chanted by Chateaubriand. Cole reconstituted this historic place through a dramatic lense.

== History ==
The work was painted during Cole's second trip to Europe. Cole altered the landscape: narrowing the canyon in order to make the setting more inspiring.

== See also ==
- List of paintings by Thomas Cole
