= Il Penseroso (painting) =

Painting by Thomas Cole

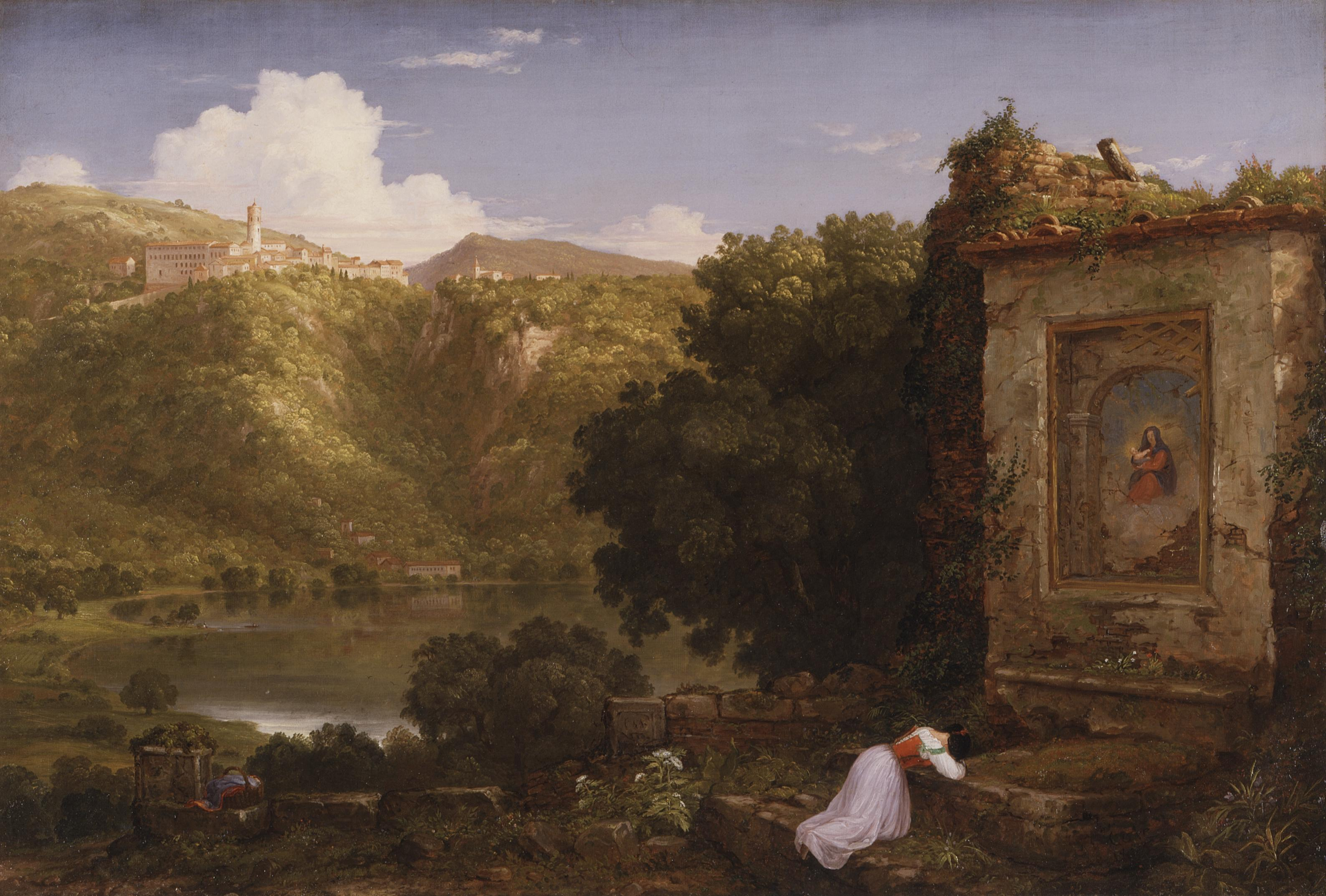
- Il Penseroso, 1845
- Artist: Thomas Cole
- Year: 1845
- Medium: Oil on Canvas
- Dimensions: 82.23 cm × 122.08 cm (32.375 in × 48.0625 in)
- Location: Los Angeles County Museum of Art, Los Angeles, California

Il Penseroso is an 1845 oil on canvas painting by British-American painter Thomas Cole, founder of the Hudson River School. The work is currently possessed by the Los Angeles County Museum of Art. Il Penseroso means "the thoughtful" in Italian.

== Artist's background ==
Tom Christopher wrote that “[Thomas] Cole’s greatest artistic asset proved to be his untutored eye.” Cole emigrated to America with his family in the spring of 1819 at the age of eighteen. As a child, his surroundings were of Lancashire, England, an area known to be an epicenter of Britain’s primarily industrial region. Because of this, Cole was granted an additional clarity of and sensitivity to the vibrancy of American landscapes awash with color, a stark contrast to the bleak and subdued landscapes of the country he left behind. From 1831 to 1832, Cole traversed Italy, where he encountered ruins.

== History ==
The work was commissioned by Charles M. Parker, along with L'Allegro, in 1844. Il Pensoroso was based on sketches Cole had made of Lake Nemi in Italy. The two works were finished in 1845 and exhibited at the National Academy of Design in the spring of 1846.

== See also ==
- List of paintings by Thomas Cole
