= Roman Campagna (painting) =

Painting by Thomas Cole

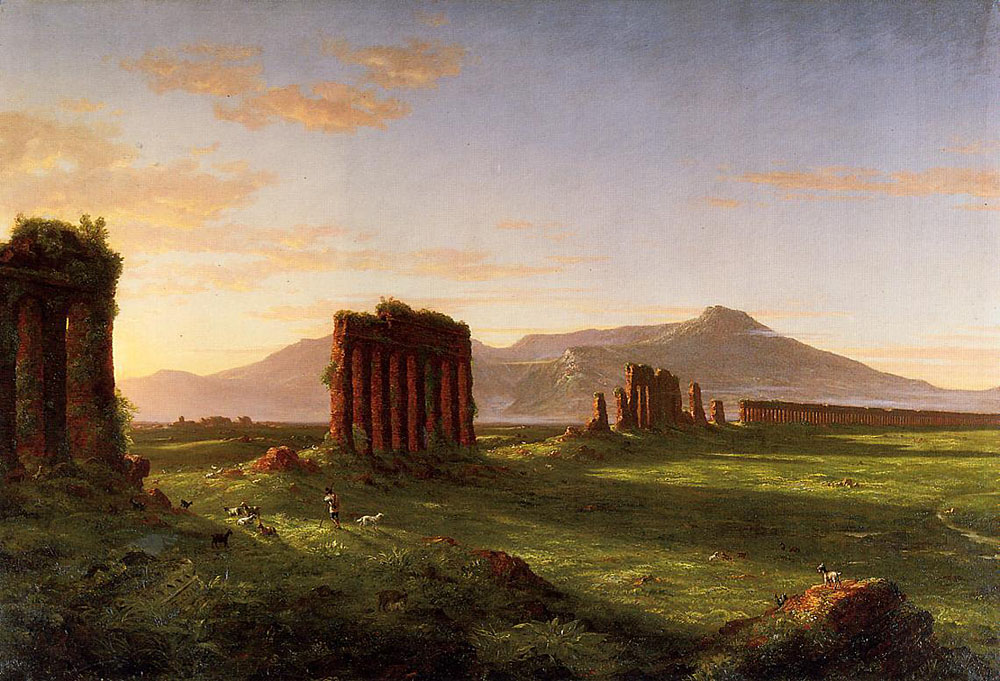
- Roman Campagna, 1843
- Artist: Thomas Cole
- Year: 1843
- Medium: Oil on Canvas
- Dimensions: 80 cm × 106.7 cm (31.5 in × 42 in)
- Location: Wadsworth Atheneum, Hartford, Connecticut

Roman Campagna, also called Ruins of Aqueducts in the Campagna Di Roma, is an 1843 oil on canvas painting by Thomas Cole. It has been displayed at the Wadsworth Atheneum in Connecticut.

== Artist's background ==
Tom Christopher wrote that “[Thomas] Cole’s greatest artistic asset proved to be his untutored eye.” Cole emigrated to America with his family in the spring of 1819 at the age of eighteen. As a child, his surroundings were of Lancashire, England, an area known to be an epicenter of Britain’s primarily industrial region. Because of this, Cole was granted an additional clarity of and sensitivity to the vibrancy of American landscapes awash with color, a stark contrast to the bleak and subdued landscapes of the country he left behind. From 1831 to 1832, Cole traversed Italy, where he encountered Roman ruins.

== See also ==
- List of paintings by Thomas Cole
