= Charles Herbert Moore =

American painter (1840–1930)

- Born: April 10, 1840; New York City, New York, United States
- Died: February 15, 1930 (aged 89); Hampshire, England
- Known for: Landscape painting
- Movement: American Pre-Raphaelite; Hudson River School

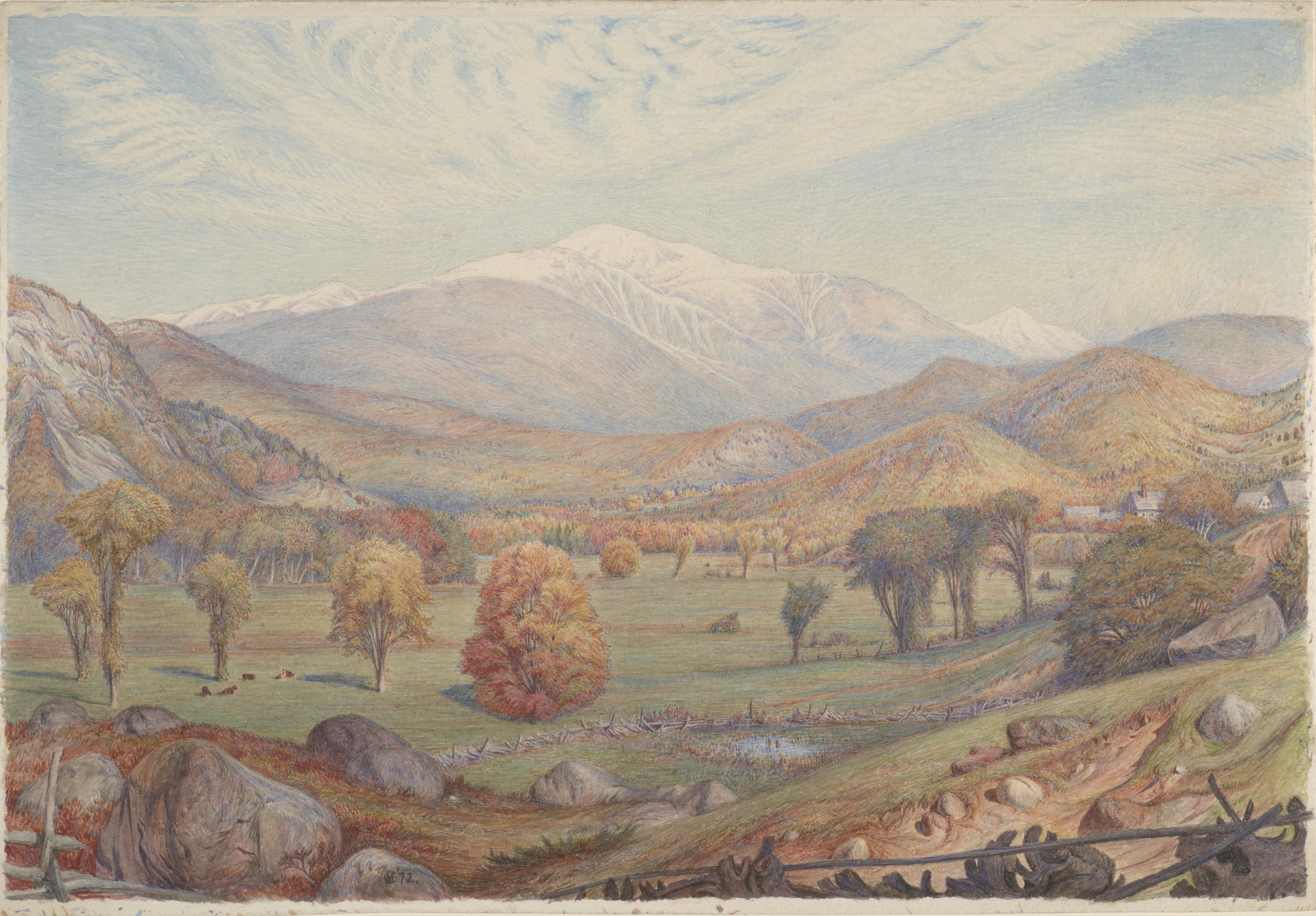
Mount Washington, 1872, watercolor on cream wove paper, 16 x 23 cm, Princeton University Art Museum, Princeton, New Jersey

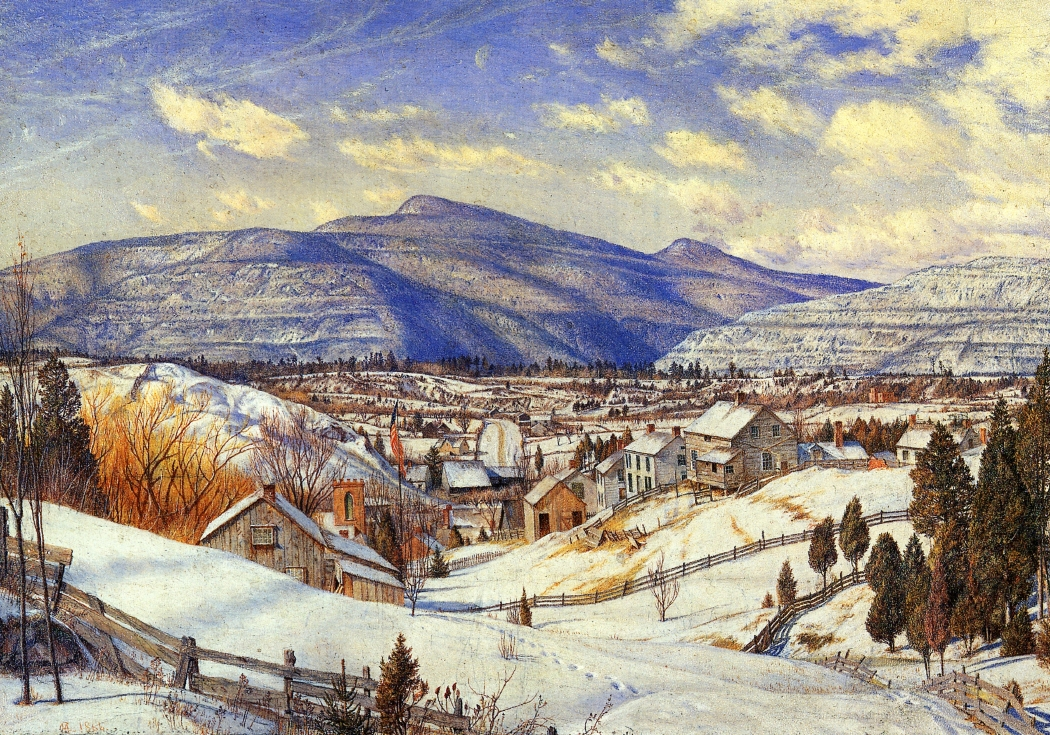
Winter Landscape, Valley of the Catskill, 1866, oil on canvas, 18 x 26 cm, Princeton University Art Museum

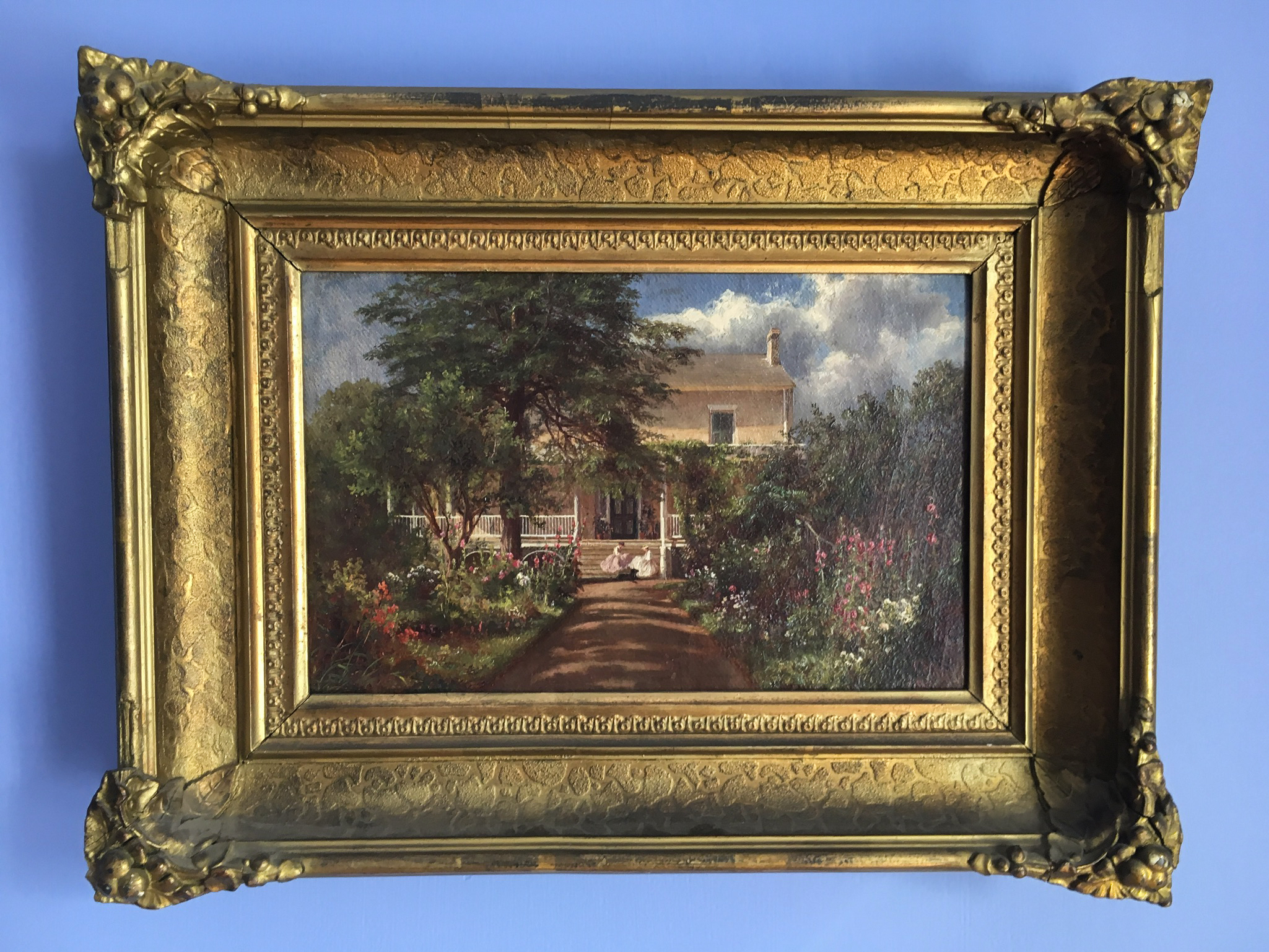
Moore's painting of Thomas Cole's house, the Thomas Cole National Historic Site, exhibited there

Charles Herbert Moore (April 10, 1840 – February 15, 1930) was an American university professor, painter, and architectural historian, known as the first director of Harvard University's Fogg Art Museum. Initially he was one of many followers of the works of John Ruskin, and was known as an American Pre-Raphaelite. But later he would abandon Ruskin to follow the teachings of the French architect Viollet le Duc.

In 1871, Moore left painting to begin teaching at Harvard, where he led its new art department. There, Moore was among the first art historians at an academic institution in the United States. After retirement, Moore moved to Hampshire, England where he wrote many books on medieval and Renaissance architecture. He died in Hampshire in 1930.

== Early life ==
Charles Moore was born on April 10, 1840, on Bleecker Street in New York City. His parents, Charles Moore and Jane Maria Berendtson had Puritanical roots. Both were religious; his father was a Quaker and his mother a Swedenborgian, something she led her son to find interest in. He became the first of three brothers and six sisters, and was educated in New York City public schools. He did not attend college.

== Career ==
Moore began learning landscape painting in the 1850s at the Thirteenth Street School, and with Benjamin H. Coe in 1853 in New York City. Moore began exhibiting at the National Academy of Design in 1858, and was elected as an associate of the organization in 1862. He began to read the works of John Ruskin and began renting space at the Tenth Street Studio Building in 1859. That year, he also made his first known trip to the Catskill Mountains, and exhibited In the Catskills at the academy the following year. In 1861, Moore gave up the New York City studio and moved to Catskill, New York, and rented a studio from Theodore Cole, son of artist Thomas Cole. At this time, he was considered a minor member of the Hudson River School art movement.

In 1863, he became a founder and one of few members of the Society for the Advancement of Truth in Art, a short-lived organization centered on the Pre-Raphaelite tradition of truthful and highly realistic artistic depictions. His art began to align with the Pre-Raphaelite movement, which he became known for. He was eager to spread Ruskin's and Pre-Raphaelite instruction, and applied as an instructor of drawing at Vassar College. From 1865 to 1869, Moore finished a major winter study in oil paint each winter, and made six meticulously painted oil landscapes, along with still lifes and nature studies in pencil and in oil.

In July 1865, Moore married Mary Jane Tomlinson, of Schenectady, New York. They moved into a cottage a half mile north of Catskill, where they remained residents year-round until fall of 1871. The stone and timber house was directly north of Cole's Cedar Grove residence and across the Hudson from Frederic Church's Olana. In 2004, the property became the Catwalk Institute, an artist and writer residency founded by James and Purcell Palmer.

Around 1866, Moore became an early member of the American Watercolor Society. In 1871, he was appointed Instructor of Freehand Drawing at the Lawrence Scientific School at Harvard University in Cambridge, Massachusetts. Moore moved to Cambridge with his wife that year.

He was the first professor of art at Harvard, along with Charles Eliot Norton, who initially recommended him to Harvard. During his tenure, from 1876 to 1878, Moore took a paid leave of absence to Italy; there he studied with John Ruskin. They sketched architecture, discussed aesthetics, and studied paintings by the Old Masters. In 1880, his wife died; he then married Elizabeth Fisk Hewins the following year (she outlived him, dying in 1933). Around 1890, Moore went to France to study its architecture, particularly the Gothic style. In 1891, Moore became an assistant professor at the university, and was awarded an honorary Master of Arts degree. In 1895, Moore became a curator at the school's Fogg Art Museum when it opened. In the following year, he became a full professor and the first director of the Fogg Art Museum, where he served until 1909.

He retired in 1909 and was designated professor emeritus at Harvard. That year he moved to Hartley Wintney in Hampshire, England. At that time, Moore wrote numerous books on medieval and Renaissance architecture. He died in Hartley Wintney on February 15, 1930.

Moore was an honorary member of the American Institute of Architects and the Royal Institute of British Architects.

== Selected works ==
- Moore, Charles Herbert (1905). Character of Renaissance Architecture. New York, New York: The Macmillan Company. OCLC 639970398.
- Moore, Charles Herbert (1906). Development & Character of Gothic Architecture (2nd ed.). New York, New York: The Macmillan Company. OCLC 70733197.
- Moore, Charles Herbert (1912). The Mediæval Church Architecture of England. New York, New York: The Macmillan Company. OCLC 475028411.
