= Olana State Historic Site =

Museum and landscape in Greenport, New York

- Olana
- U.S. National Register of Historic Places
- U.S. National Historic Landmark
- New York State Register of Historic Places
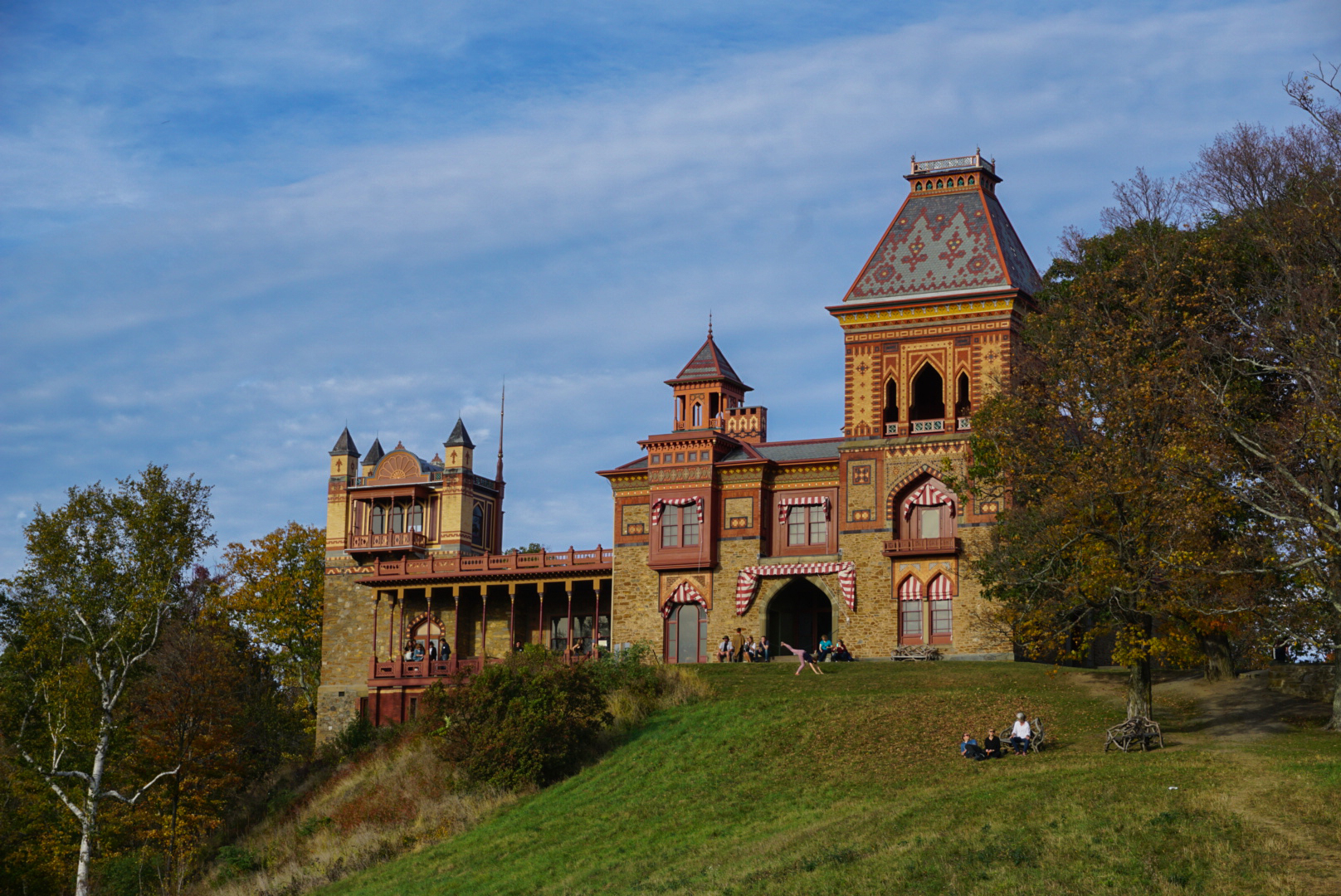
- The Olana mansion

- Location within New York Location within the United States
- Interactive map showing the location of Olana
- Location: Greenport, Columbia County, New York
- Nearest city: Hudson
- Coordinates: 42°13′04″N 73°49′46″W
- Area: 250.2 acres (101.3 ha)
- Built: 1870–72
- Architect: Frederic Edwin Church, Calvert Vaux
- Architectural style: Exotic Revival
- NRHP reference No.: 66000509
- NYSRHP No.: 02111.000001

Significant dates
- Added to NRHP: October 15, 1966
- Designated NHL: June 22, 1965
- Designated NYSRHP: June 23, 1980

Olana State Historic Site is a historic house museum and landscape in Greenport, New York, near the city of Hudson. The estate was home to Frederic Edwin Church (1826–1900), one of the major figures in the Hudson River School of landscape painting. The centerpiece of Olana is an eclectic villa which overlooks parkland and a working farm designed by the artist. The residence has a wide view of the Hudson River Valley, the Catskill Mountains and the Taconic Range. Church and his wife Isabel (1836–1899) named their estate after a fortress-treasure house in ancient Greater Persia (modern-day Armenia), which also overlooked a river valley.

Olana is one of the few intact artists' home-, studio- and estate-complexes in the United States; it was designated a National Historic Landmark in 1965. The house is also a prime example of Orientalist architecture. It is owned and operated by the New York State Office of Parks, Recreation and Historic Preservation, and is also supported by The Olana Partnership, a non-profit 501(c)(3) organization. The main building is an architectural masterpiece designed by Frederic Church in consultation with the architect Calvert Vaux. The stone, brick, and polychrome-stenciled villa is a mixture of Moroccan, Victorian, Persian and Moorish styles. The interior remains much as it was during Church's lifetime, exotically furnished and decorated with objects from his global travels, and with some 40 paintings by Church and his friends. The house is intricately stenciled inside and out; Church designed the stencils based on his travels in the Middle East. The house contains Church's last studio, built as an addition from 1888 to 1890.

== History ==
In 1845, Frederic Church first sketched on the property that was to become Olana. He was then a student of Thomas Cole, now considered a founding figure of the Hudson River School of painters. On March 31, 1860, a few months before his marriage to Isabel Carnes, Church returned to purchase a 126-acre (51 ha) hardscrabble farm on a south-facing slope of a hill in Columbia County, near the thriving towns of Hudson and Catskill, New York. The first element he added to the property was a small country cottage, believed to have been designed by Richard Morris Hunt. In addition, Church laid out gardens and orchards, dredged a marsh to create a 10-acre (4.0 ha) lake, planted trees, and built a studio. Frederic and Isabel Church called their house "Cosy Cottage" and their property "the Farm".

Two children were born to the Churches, a son in 1862 and a daughter in 1865. The family's bucolic life at Olana was forever changed in March 1865, with the deaths of the children from diphtheria. Grieving from this, the greatest emotional blow of their lives, the parents traveled with sympathetic friends to Jamaica for four months, then to a retreat in Vermont. Late in 1865, the couple returned to Cosy Cottage to start anew. Frederic Joseph Church was born in autumn 1866, the first of three sons and a daughter that were raised to adulthood at Olana.

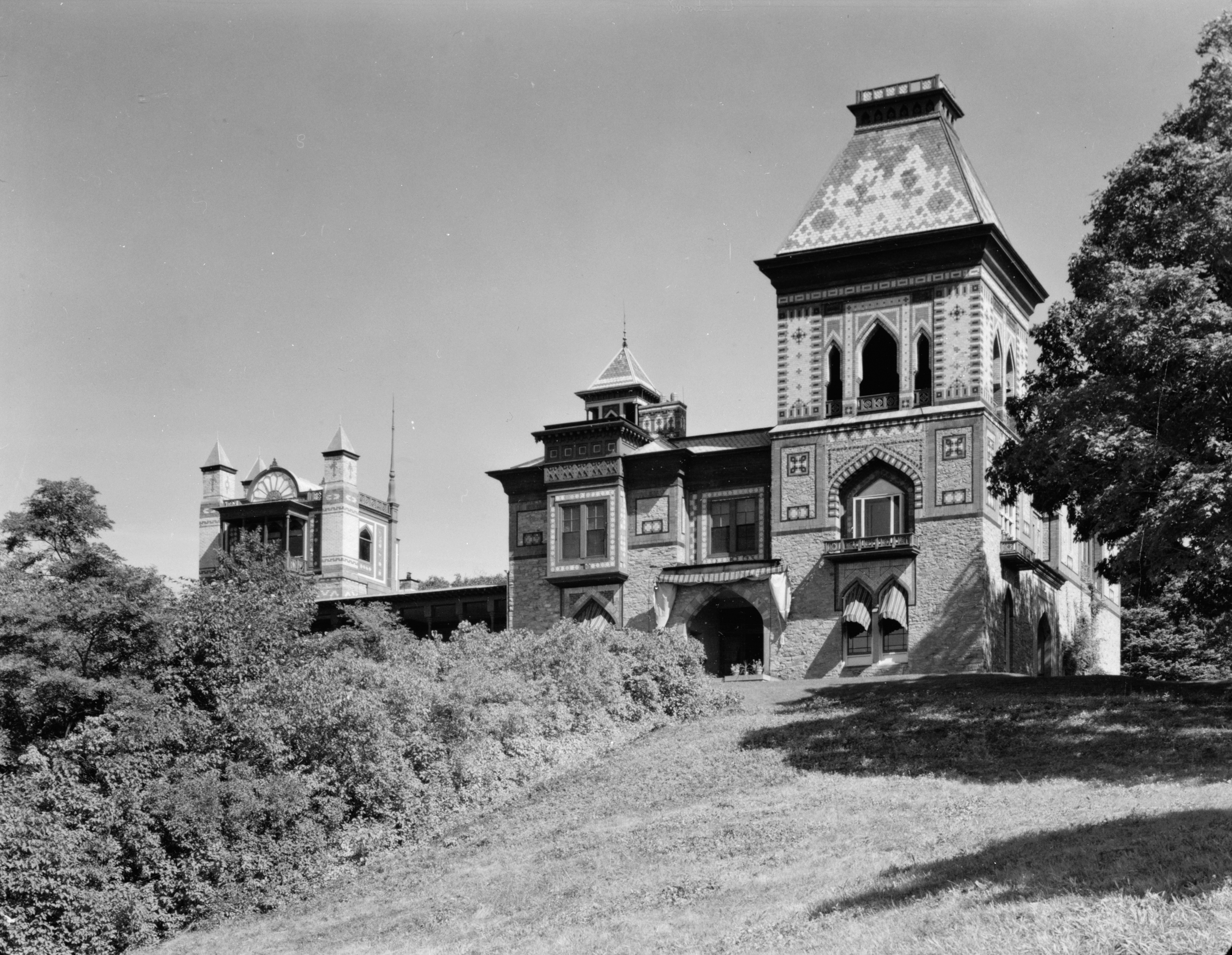
House exterior, 1969

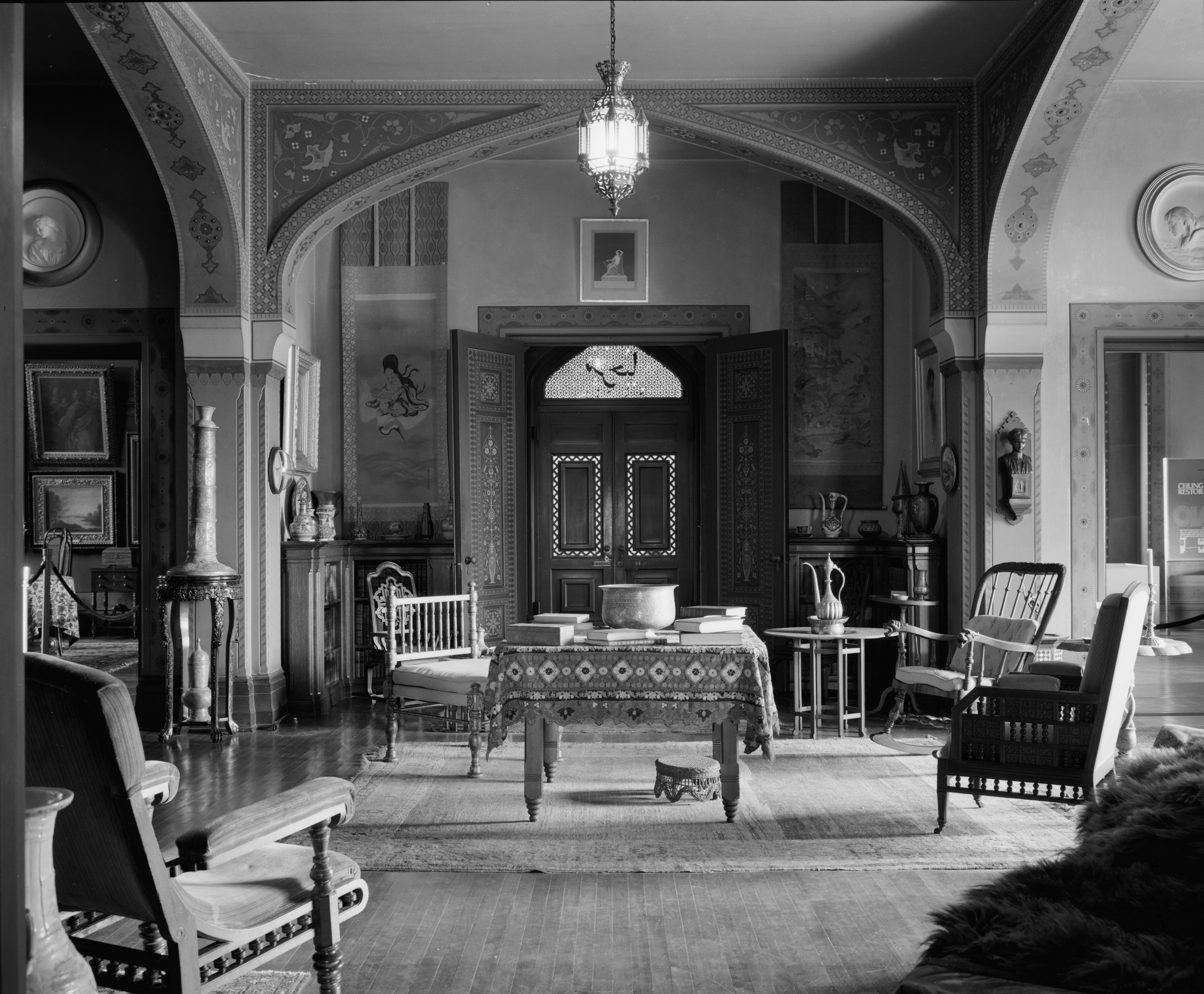
Court Hall, 1969

In 1867 Church acquired a parcel of mature woods at the top of his hill, and began planning a large house for the site. After an 18-month trip to Europe and the Middle East, Church hired architect Calvert Vaux and worked with him on the design of the mansion, which was constructed between 1870 and 1872. The Churches hosted notable figures from the literary, religious, artistic and business worlds: writer Charles Dudley Warner and his pianist wife Susan, author and artist Susan Hale, sculptor Erastus Dow Palmer and his wife Mary Jane, industrialist William H. Osborn and his wife Virginia, and humorist Mark Twain. For Christmas in 1879, Isabel Church gave her husband several books on the geography of the ancient Middle East, and shortly thereafter the couple began calling their property "Olana".

Church continuously improved the property, plotting scenic carriage roads and adding a studio wing to the house over the period 1888–1891. Although the Churches often wintered in warmer climates, and spent time in New York City, Olana was their main residence. After Isabel Church's death in 1899 and Frederic Church's death in 1900, the property was inherited by their son Louis Church, who married Sarah Baker Good (known as Sally), daughter of Pennsylvania Industrialist George S. Good in 1901. Louis and Sally Church maintained the property largely as it had been left to them, adding additional acreage for farming. Upon Sally Church's death in 1964, a nephew inherited the estate and intended to sell it to developers at a public auction. After a two-year anti-development campaign led by scholar David C. Huntington (1922–1990), which culminated in a cover story on Olana in Life magazine, New York State purchased the property in 1966 and it was opened to the public.

== Landscape ==
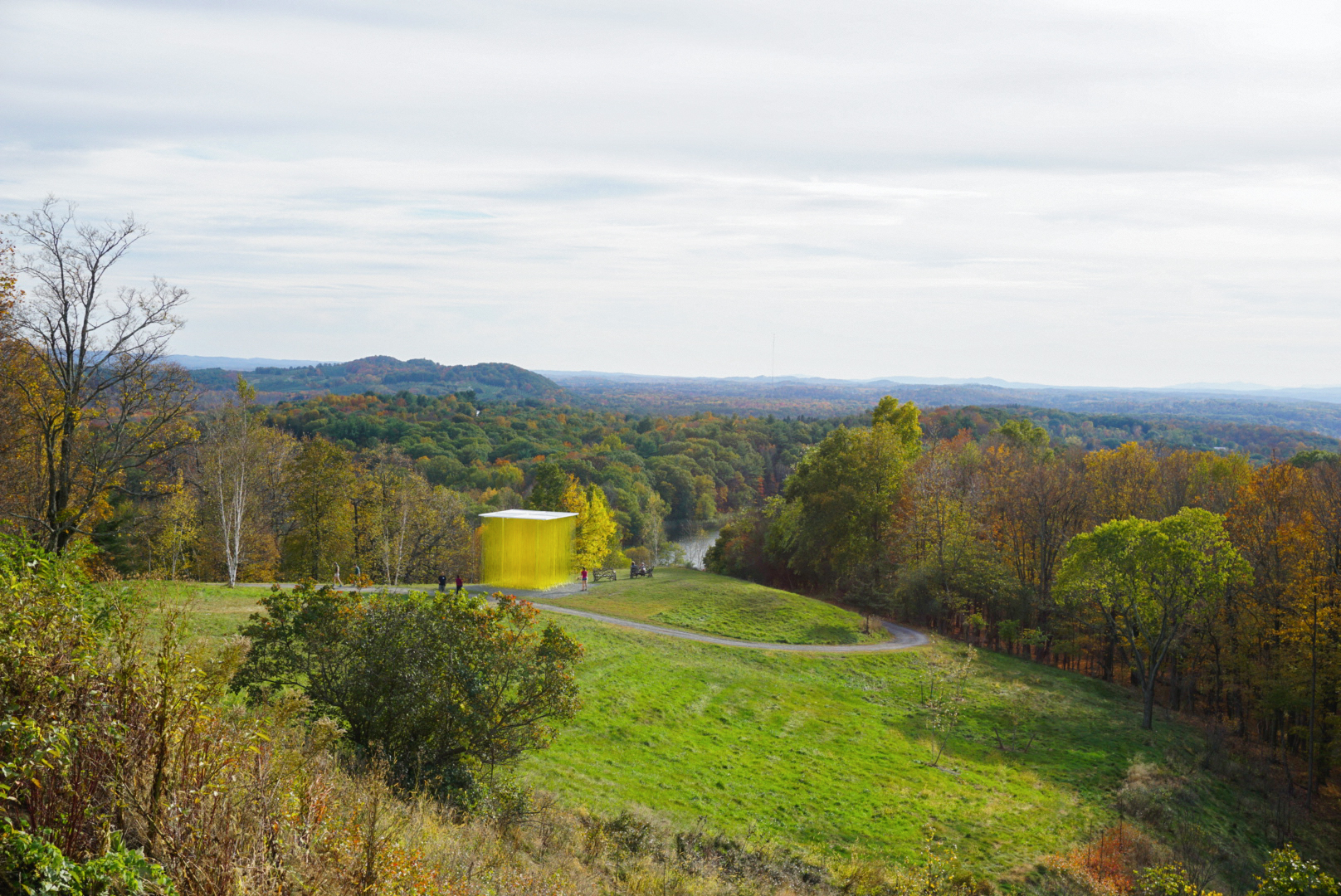
Part of Olana's landscape and viewshed

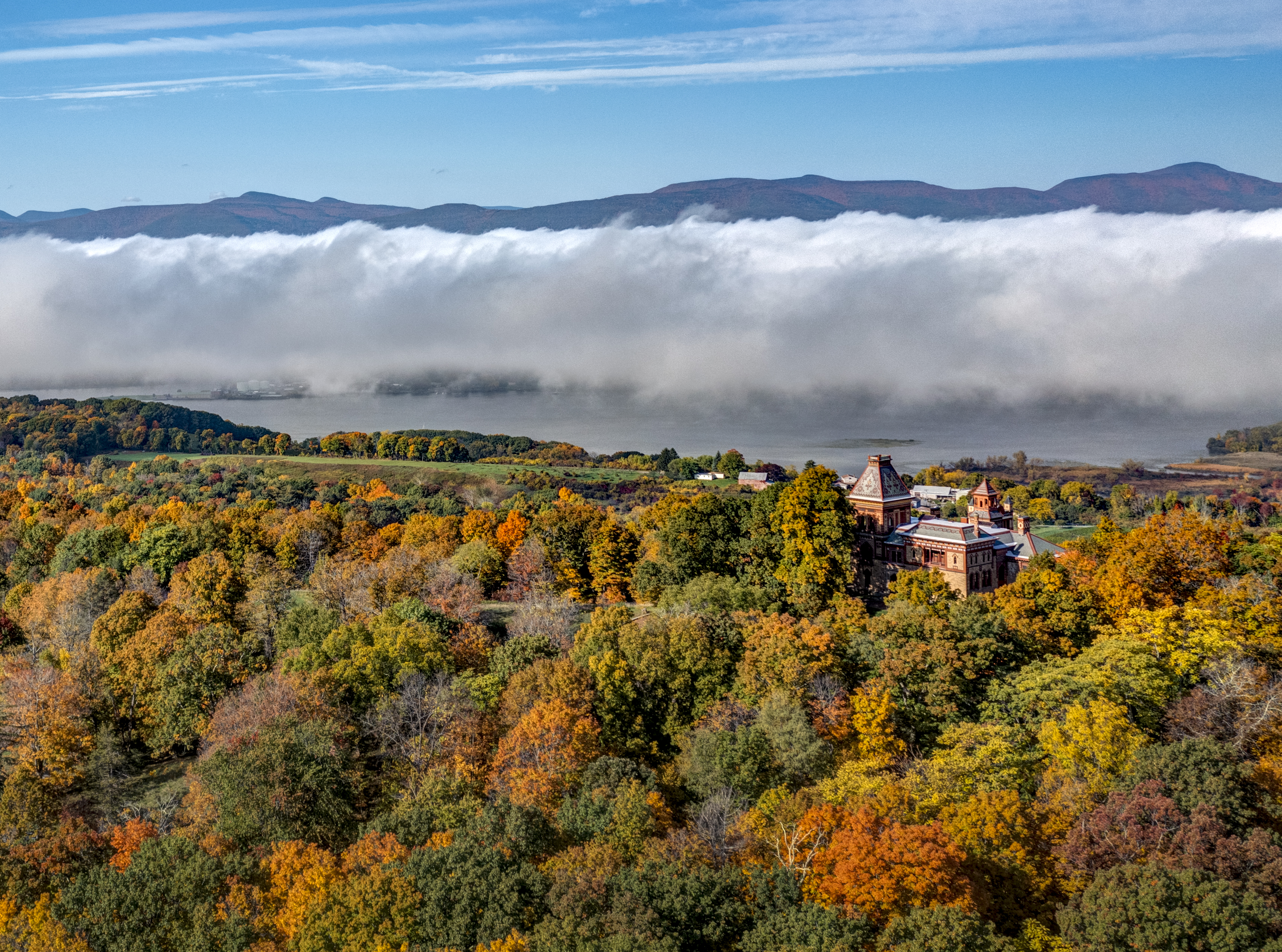
Grounds and view of the Catskill range

Over the last forty years of his life, Frederic Church created a 250-acre (1.0 km^{2}) designed landscape at Olana. In an 1884 letter, Church wrote of his work on the grounds at Olana, "I can make more and better landscapes in this way than by tampering with canvas and paint in the studio." Today Olana is known as one of the most important surviving Picturesque landscapes in the United States. Produced during the same period with the same aesthetic and ideological motivations, the landscape at Olana has been compared to Central Park, designed by Frederick Law Olmsted and Calvert Vaux.

Church began the physical landscape design at Olana by searching three years for the ideal property. He had walked and sketched throughout much of New England and elsewhere by that time, but his formative two years studying with Thomas Cole in nearby Catskill, New York, brought him back to the Hudson Valley. The Church estate covers a series of small knolls rising up to the Sienghenbergh – Dutch for "Long Hill" – where the main house is sited. From various points around the property, one has views of the Hudson River, the Catskill, Taconic and Berkshire Mountain ranges, as well as New York, Connecticut, Massachusetts and Vermont.

In 1860, Frederic Church made his initial acquisition of a 126-acre (50.99 ha) farm, which he developed into a ferme ornée, an ornamental farm.[6] Around Cosy Cottage, a profitable 15.5 acres (6.3 hectares) orchard and 4.3 acres (1.7 hectares) of vegetable and fruit gardens were created in addition to pastures and crop land, each with a distinct visual character. The family always called their place "the farm," but when he bought the land, Church took about half out of active agricultural production to create a landscaped park. In this park, Church planted thousands of native trees (many transplanted from elsewhere on site); created a 10-acre (40,000 m^{2}) lake from a swamp; built a freestanding studio, summer house, and rustic benches and railings; and designed five miles (8.0 km) of carriage drives paved in crushed red shale mined on site. Church strategically acquired additional adjacent parcels until his property encompassed 250.2 acres (101.3 hectares) and the top of the hill where the main house at Olana now stands.

To conceal, reveal and frame vistas of his own property and the wider Hudson Valley, Church combined natural landforms with the careful layout of carriage drives and extensive plantings of trees and shrubs. Frederick Law Olmsted thought of such landscapes as "pictures" through which people might wander. In addition to entertaining often, the Churches opened the Olana grounds to the public. From the popular carriage drives, visitors experienced the artist's landscape vignettes almost as cinema, in a sequence choreographed by Church. The ultimate aspect of Church's designed landscape is the view from the main house. There, the ground drops away sharply, the Hudson widens to two miles (3.2 km) across, and the Catskills rise up steeply. Like Church's painted views of Niagara Falls, Canadian icebergs, and South American volcanoes this scene captures the majesty of nature. For the artist and his contemporaries, this vista also captured the essence of their new nation with references to pioneering history, present economic strength, and the distinguished literary and artistic legacies of the region's Knickerbocker Group and Hudson River School.

These elements were incorporated into the landscape master plan by Nelson Byrd Woltz. The revival of Church's vision as a living landscape is chronicled in a book by art historian Barry Bergdoll.

== Main residence ==
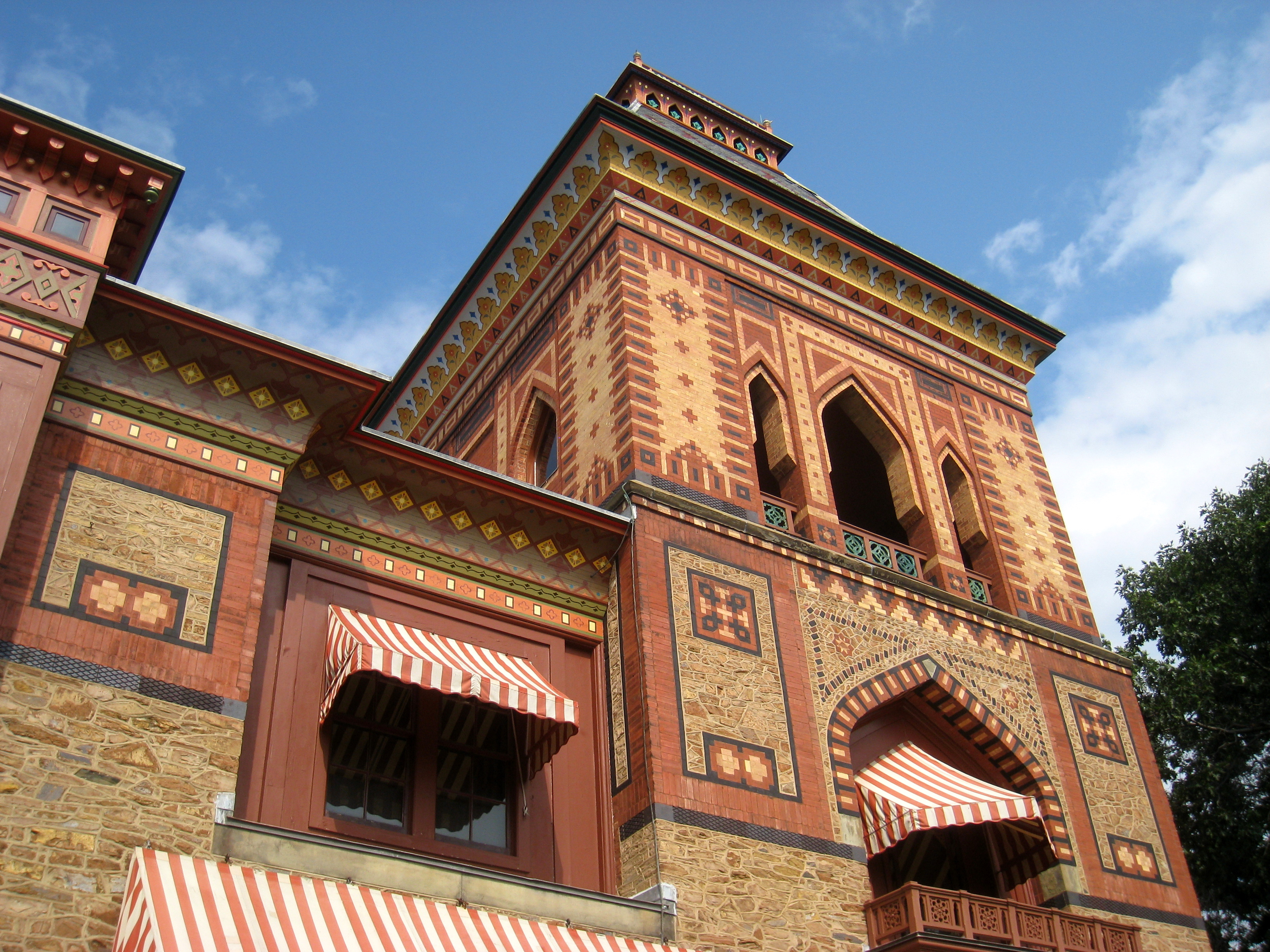
The south facade of the main house

The stone, brick, and polychrome-stenciled villa at Olana is an unusual mixture of Victorian structural elements and Middle-Eastern decorative motifs from different times and places. Moorish elements mix with contrasting Italianate themes. Frederic and Isabel Church were impressed by the architecture they had seen on their travels in Beirut, Jerusalem and Damascus in 1868. Upon their return to their farm, they abandoned preliminary plans from Richard Morris Hunt delineating a manor house in the French style. Instead, Church worked closely with architect Calvert Vaux to realize a more personal vision. Church was responsible for the overall design and much of the detail, with Vaux's involvement essentially that of consultant. Church wrote to a friend, "I am building a house and am principally my own Architect. I give directions all day and draw plans and working drawings all night." The result was a villa with asymmetrical massing of towers and block masonry punctuated by fanciful windows and porches. The irregular silhouette of the exterior contrasted with the more regular rhythm of rooms arranged around a central hall. On the exterior, Middle Eastern motifs were carried out in colored brick, slate, ceramic tile and especially stenciling. The cornices of the separate sections of the structure were each ornamented with multi-colored and gilt stenciling, the patterns designed by Church himself. The stenciling continued in the principle rooms of the first floor. Together, the various motifs and themes create a unique artistic unity, one that is difficult to categorize. It has been called variously Persian-Moorish-Eclectic, and Italianate-Eastern-Picturesque. Poet John Ashbery described the results: "The ensemble is breathtaking, and despite the proliferation of architectural elements and polychrome tile decoration, it is not busy but solemn and wildly fanciful, like Church's painting."

Church designed or commissioned many other devices, such as amber glass windows overlaid by cut-paper patterns and carved teak woodwork by Lockwood de Forest's workshops in Ahmadabad, India. With no architectural adviser, Church designed and built the studio wing at the west end of the house, which included guest rooms and a glassed-in observation room in the tower. Describing his house to a newspaper reporter, Church characterized it as "Persian, adapted to the Occident".

The furnishings Frederic and Isabel acquired over the course of their lives remain in the house. There are paintings by Frederic Church as well as artwork by his mentor Thomas Cole and friends Martin Johnson Heade and Erastus Dow Palmer. The dining room houses a collection of Old Master paintings. The eclectic assortment of furniture and decorative arts includes carpets, metalwork, ceramics and costumes from the Middle East, folk art and fine art from Mexico, and high-style American and Oriental furniture. The main residence at Olana has been described as a prime example of the Aesthetic Movement in America.

=== Exterior views ===
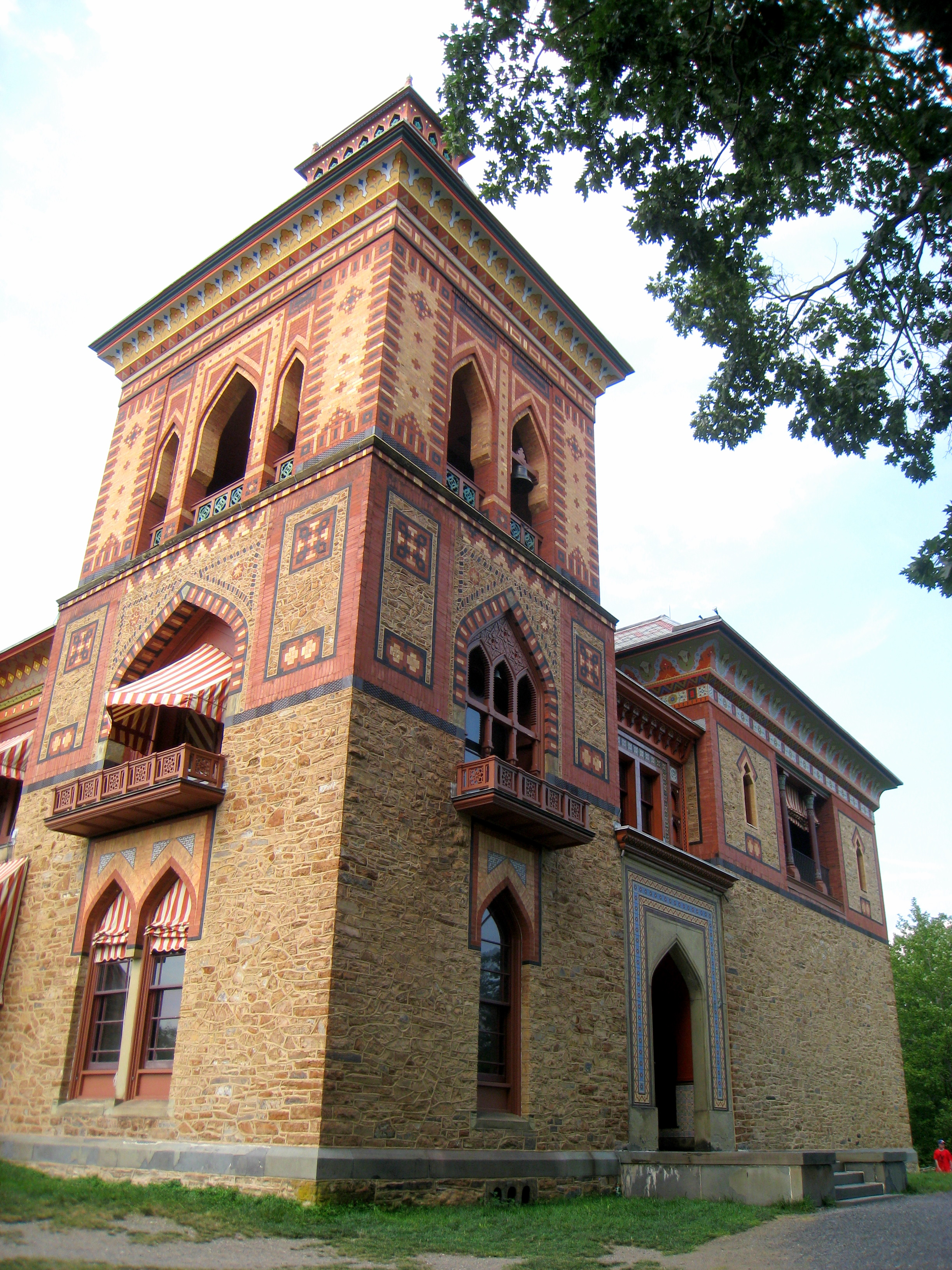
Tower at the south corner of the house

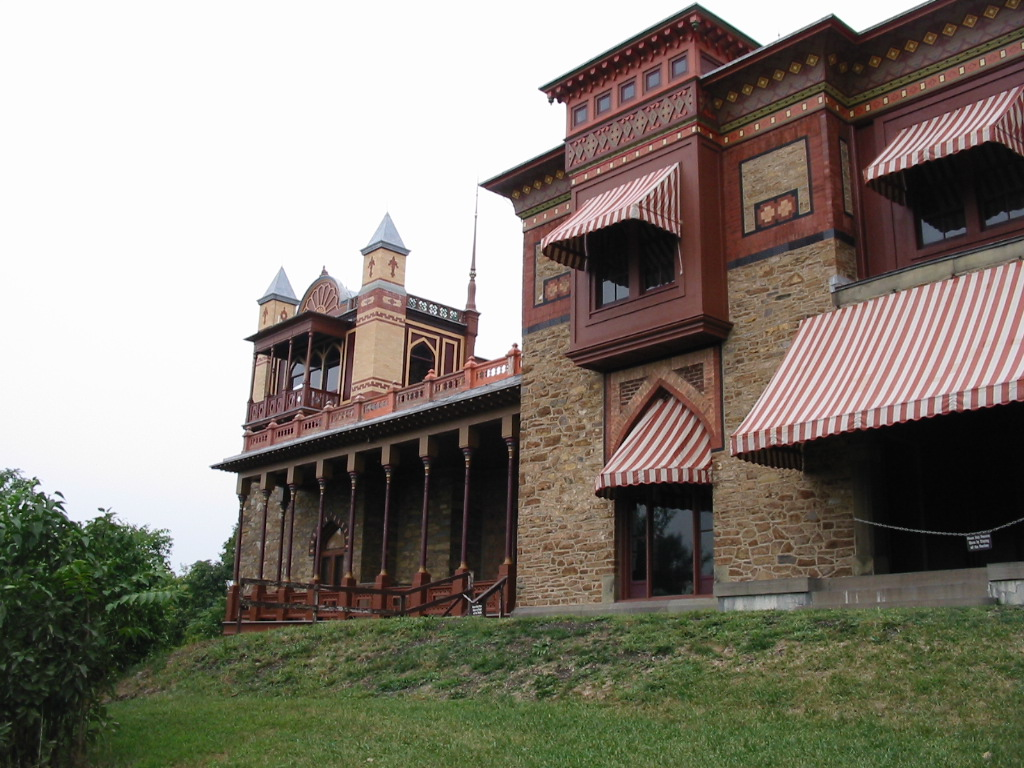
Detail of the southwest facade

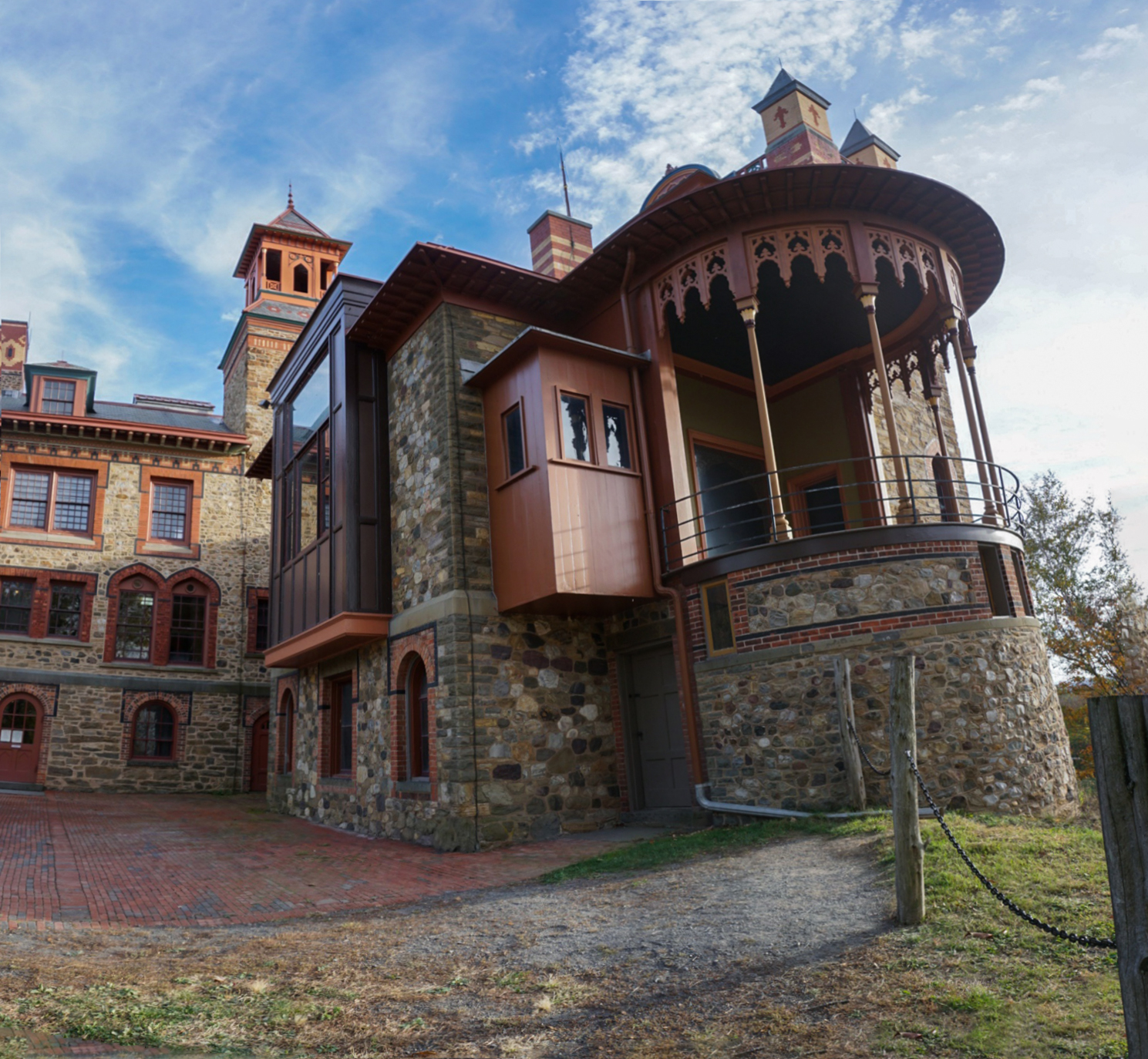
Studio addition at the northeast

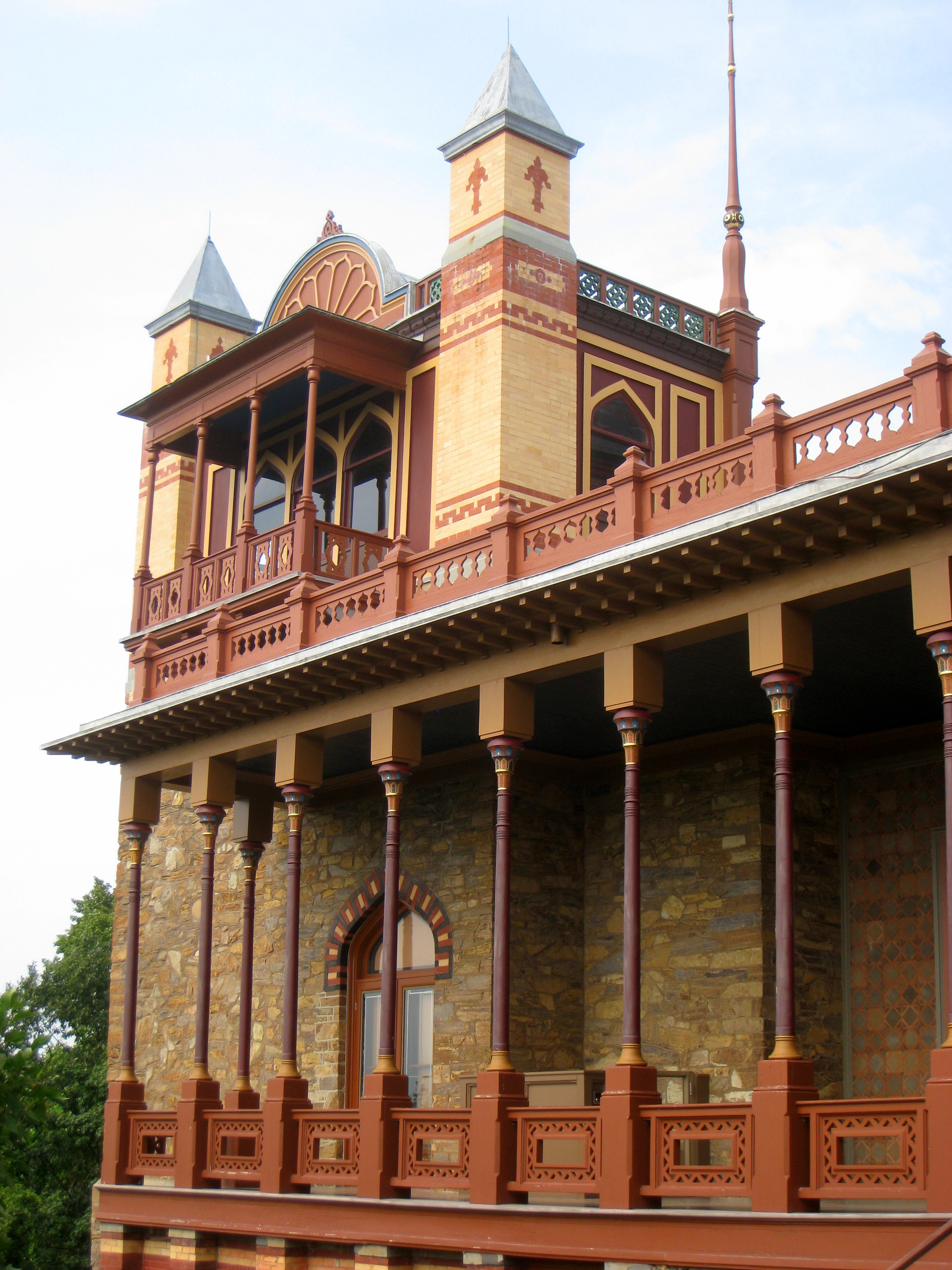
Closeup of the piazza and studio tower

=== Interior views ===
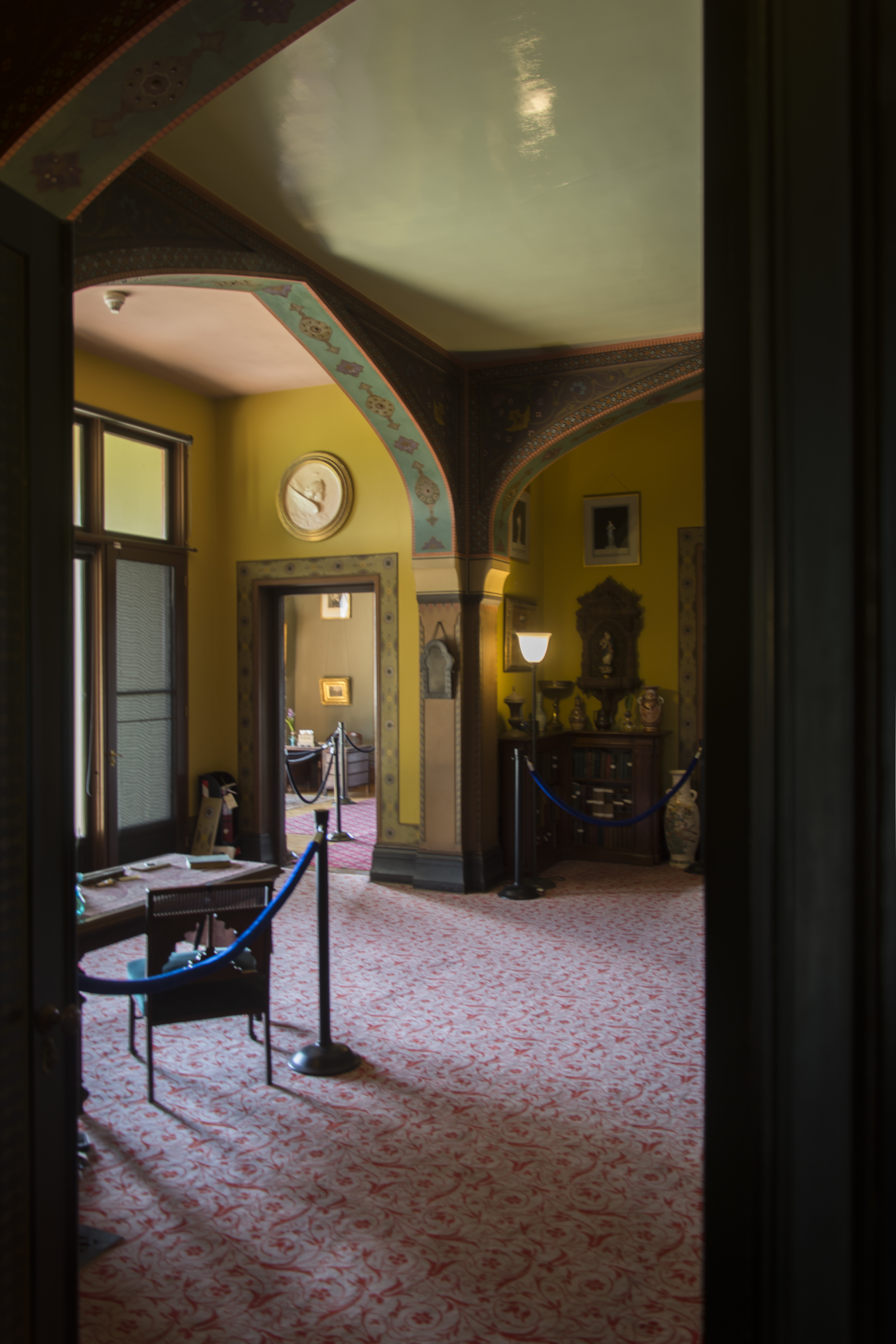
Court Hall

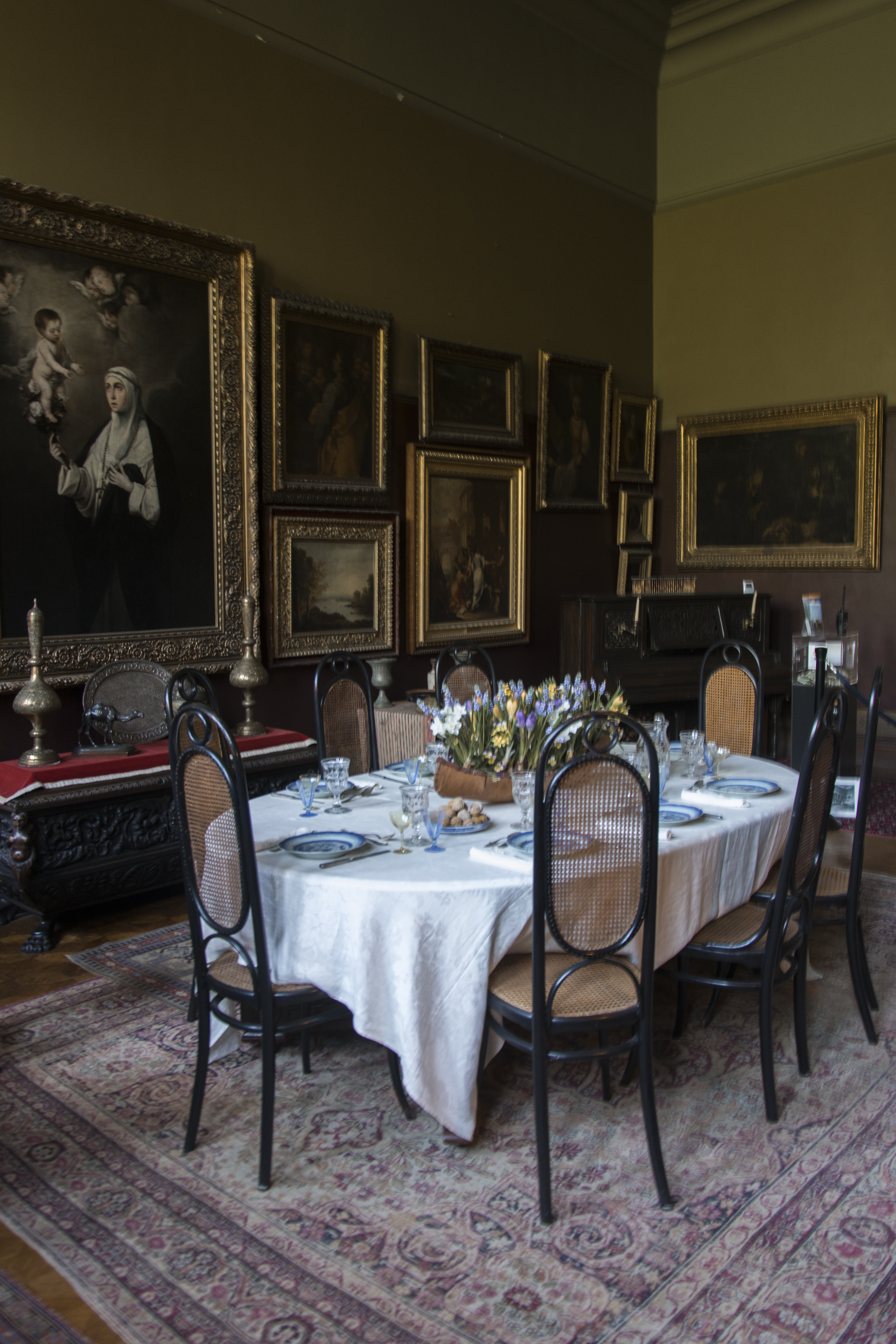
Dining Room

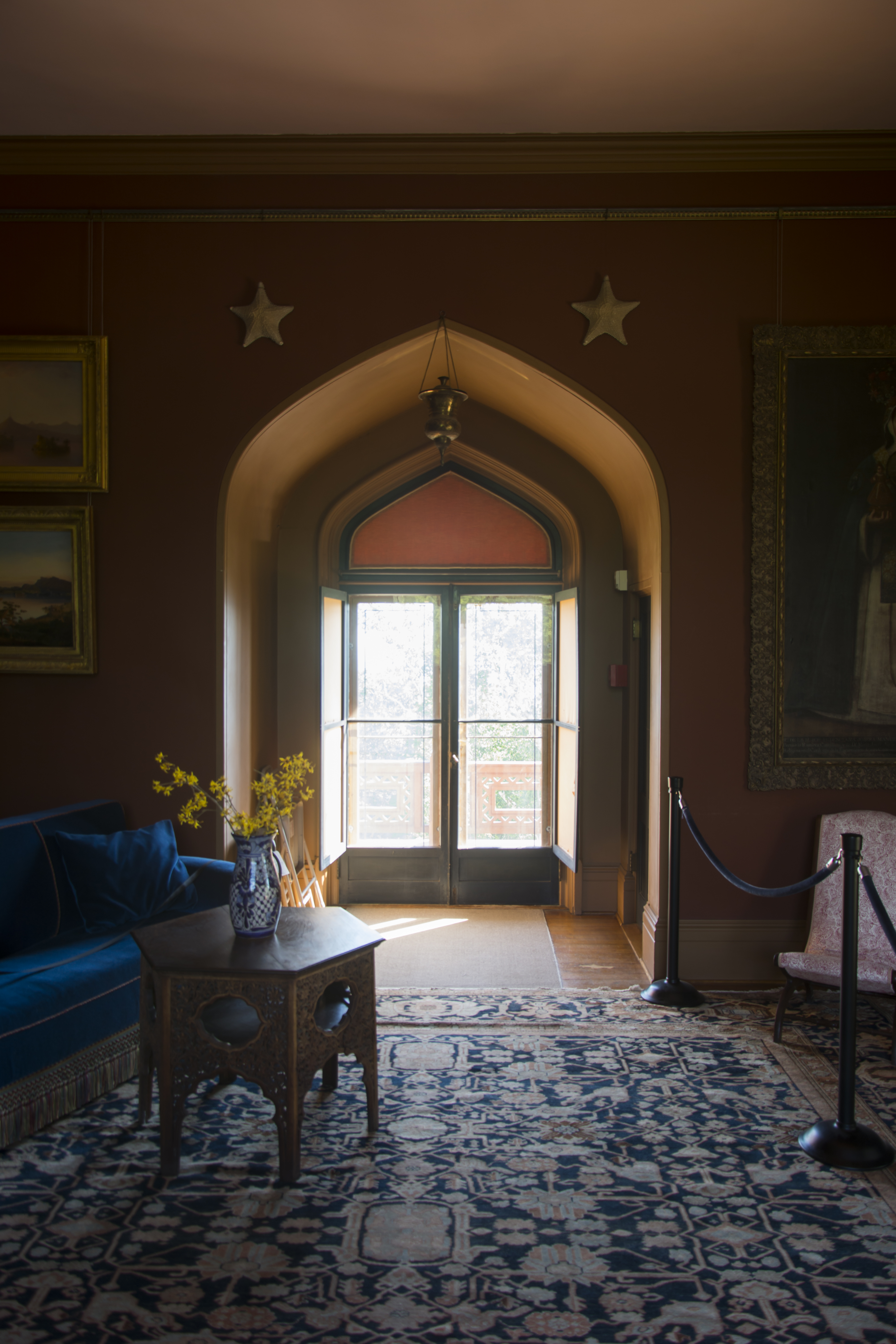
A first-floor interior

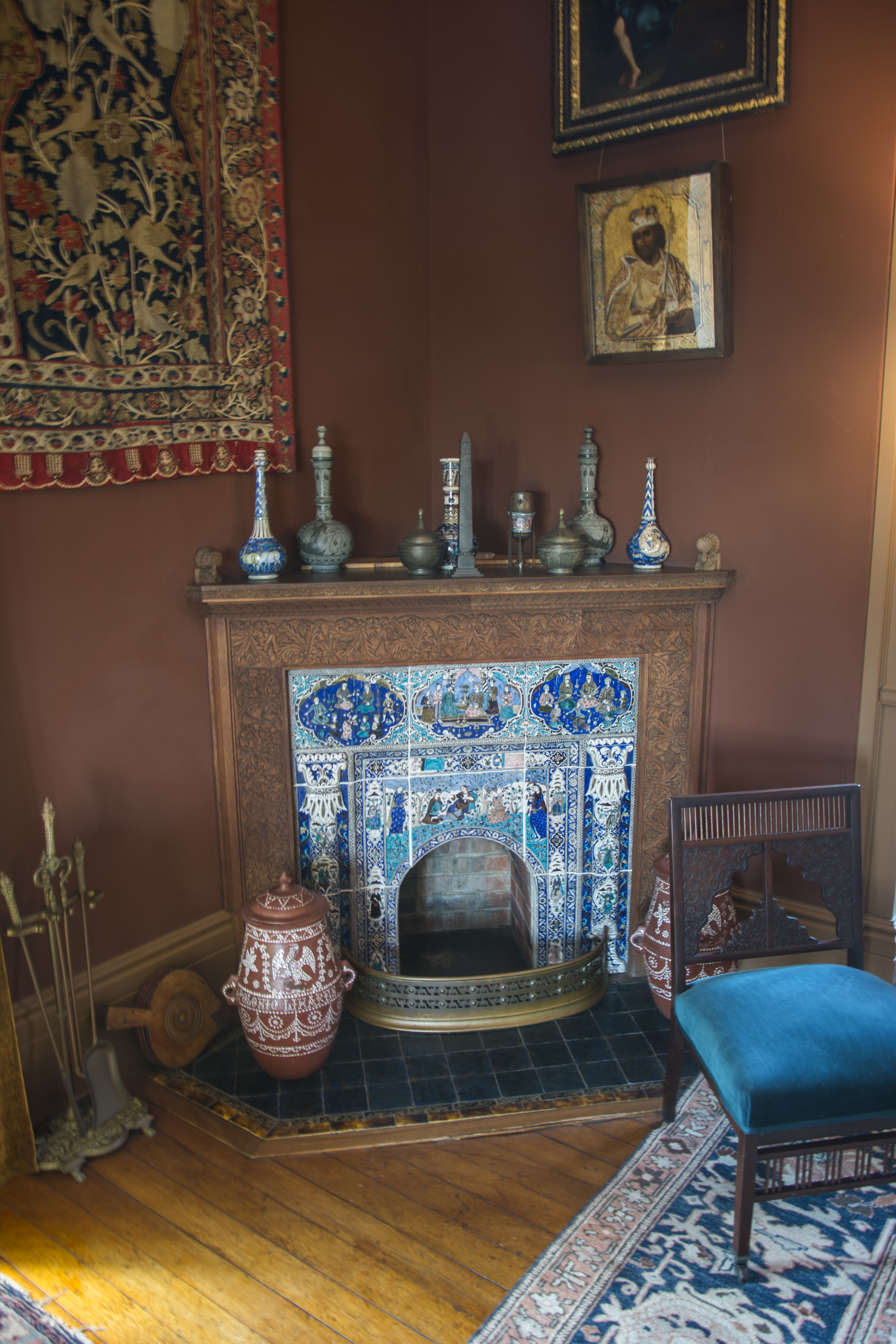
Fireplace in the studio

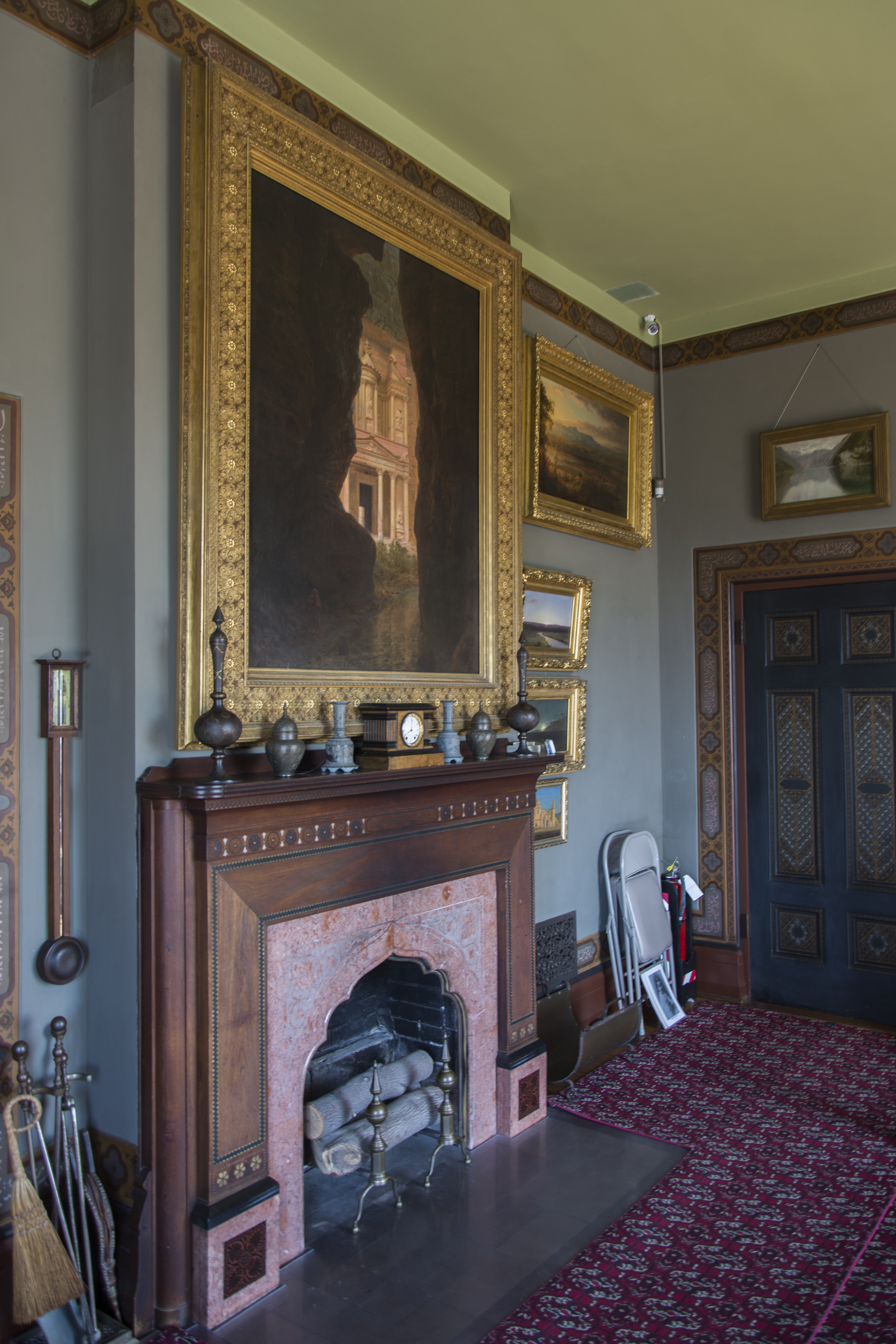
A first-floor interior

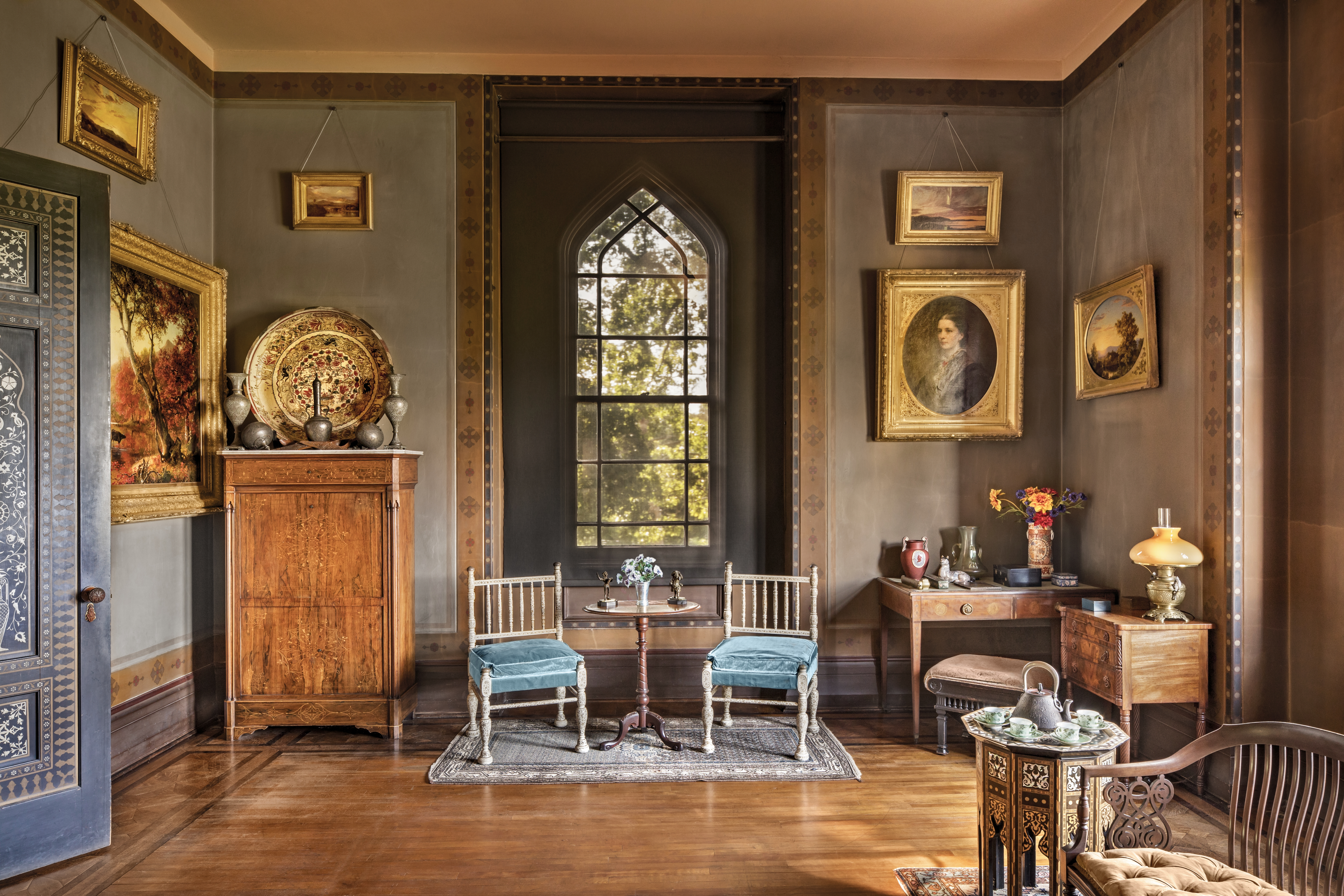
A first-floor interior

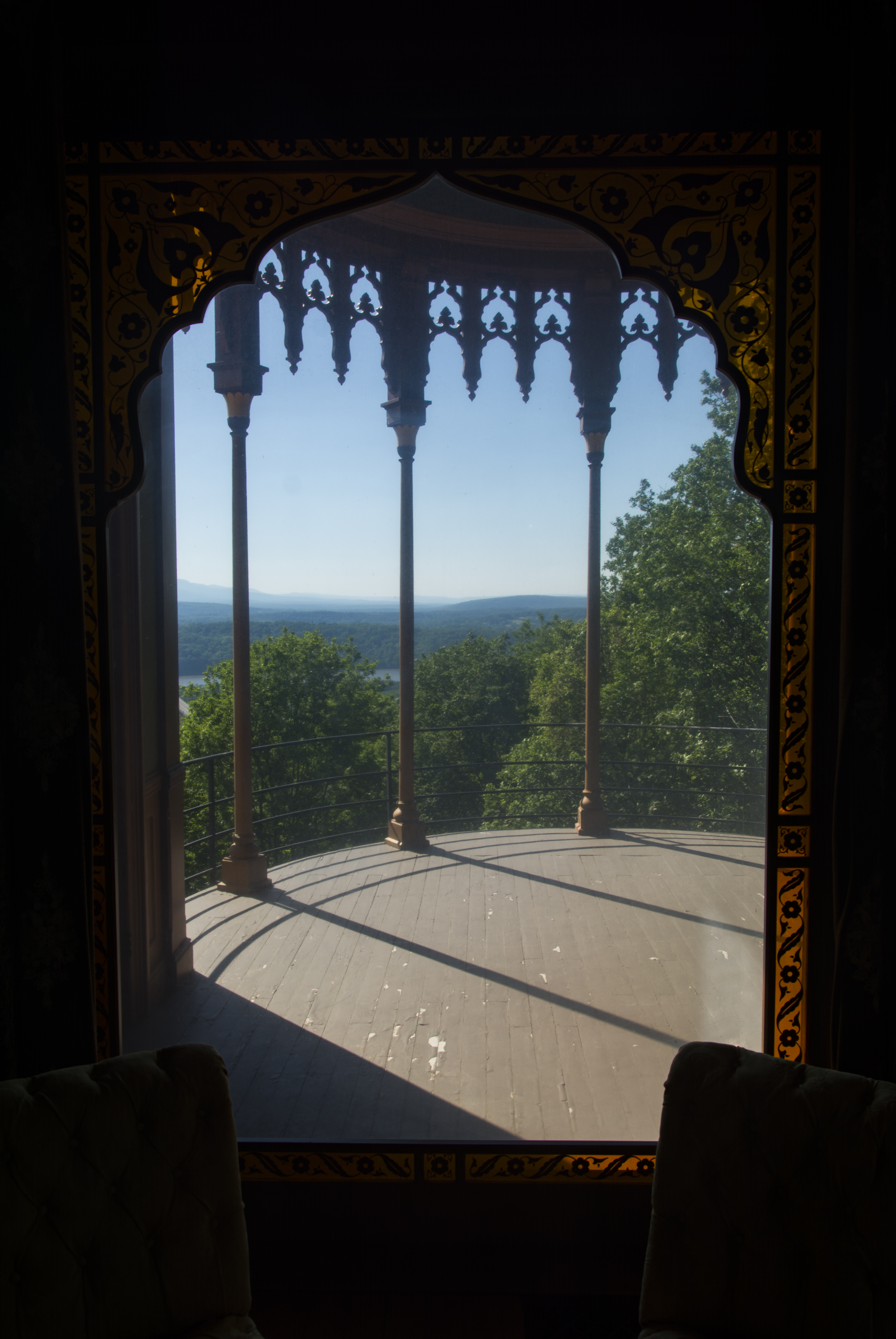
Porch

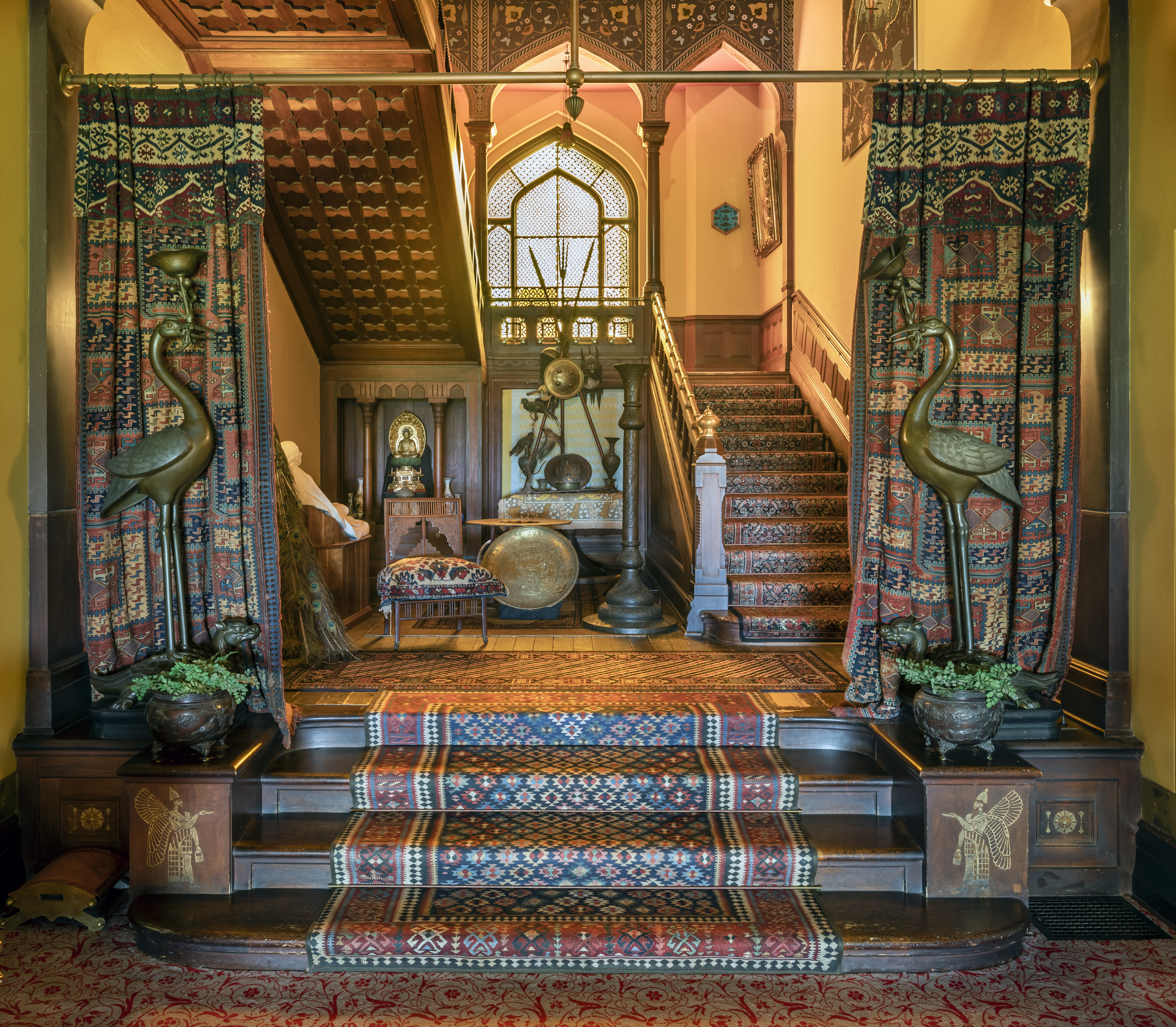
Main staircase

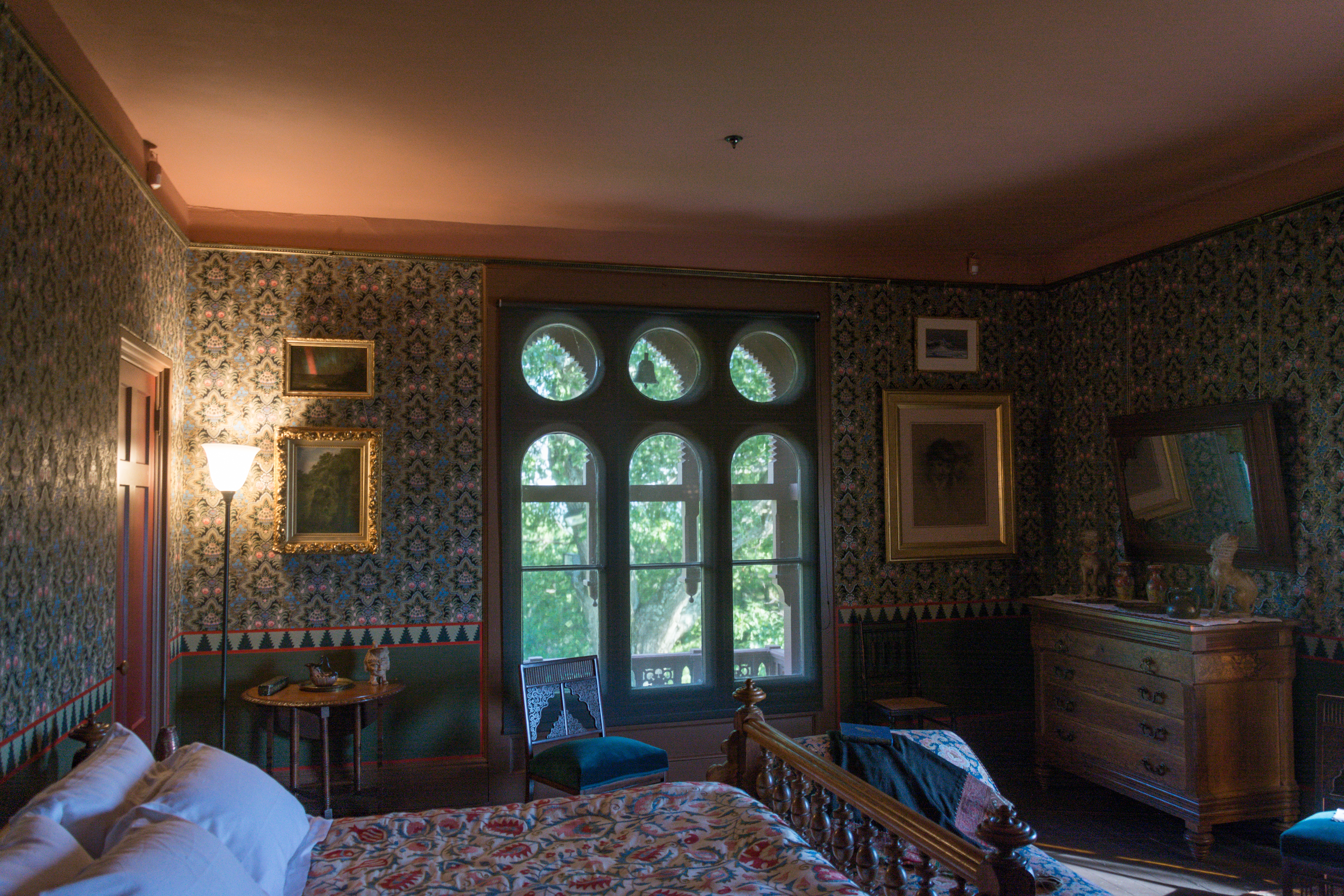
A second-floor bedroom

== Artworks created ==
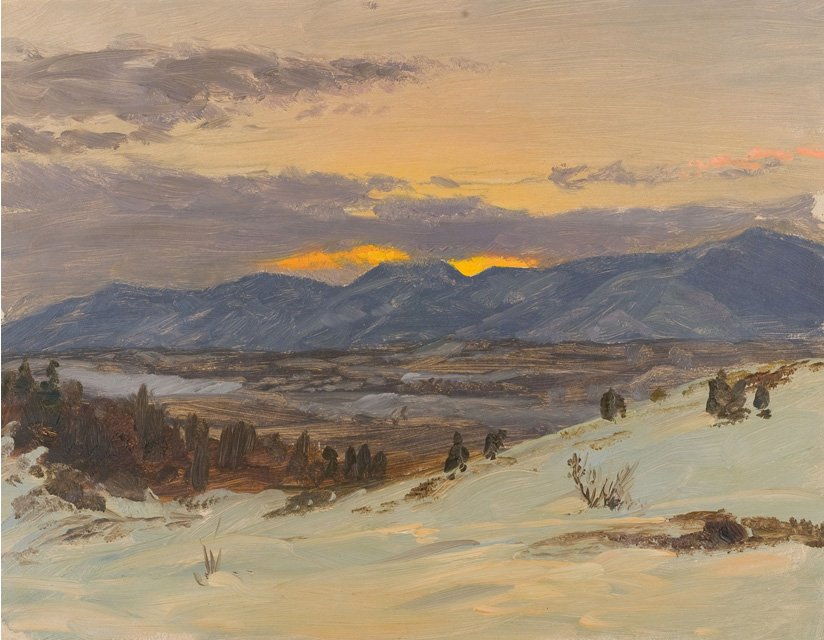
Winter Twilight from Olana, by Frederic Church, c. 1871

Frederic Church executed some of his most famous works at Olana, in a studio that stood on the hill above the Cosy Cottage. Throughout his life but especially in the 1850s, Church traveled throughout North and South America, making oil and pencil sketches that served as notes for the artwork to come. Although Church's major artworks appear to be transcriptions of the landscape, they are, as Church called them, "compositions"—composed from his sketches and his own artistic intentions. In the 1860s and 1870s this process occurred at Olana, and also at Church's Tenth Street Studio Building in New York City. Typically, Church did the bulk of his work in the studio at Olana, then finished the painting in New York. Church also made vibrant sketches of the Olana landscape; he framed a few and hung them in the main residence.

In the studio at Olana he made hundreds of pencil and oil technical drawings for stencils, mantels, banisters, and other architectural elements of the main house. With the onset of rheumatism in the 1870s, Church's painting became severely curtailed. Increasingly, he turned his attention to Olana itself, improving the landscape, buying artwork for the house, and building the studio wing.

Olana was one of several grand artist's homes in the Hudson River valley, comparable to Albert Bierstadt's Malkasten in Irvington (destroyed by fire in 1882) and Jasper Francis Cropsey's Ever Rest, in Hastings-on-Hudson.

== Viewshed ==
Parts of Olana's viewshed
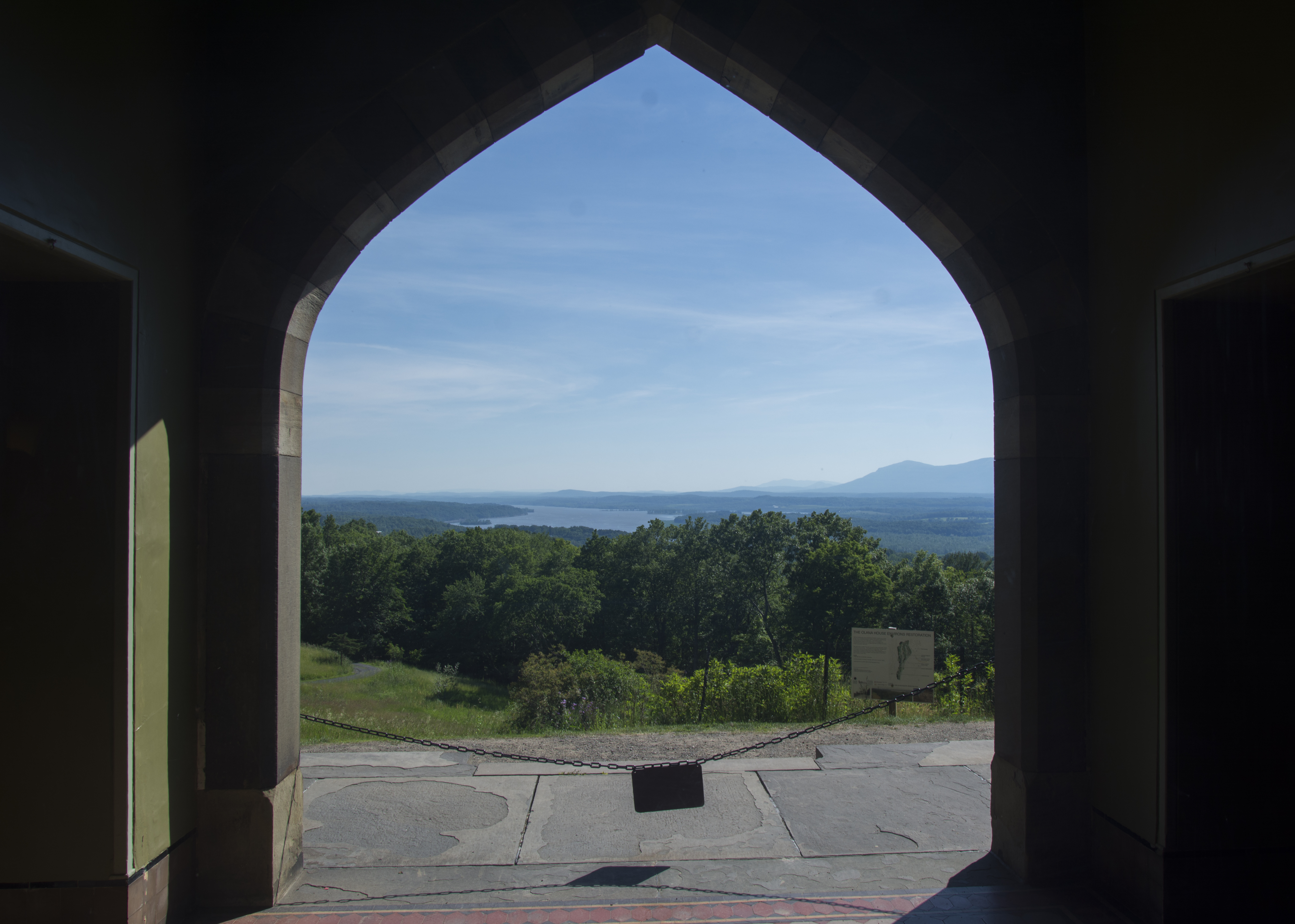
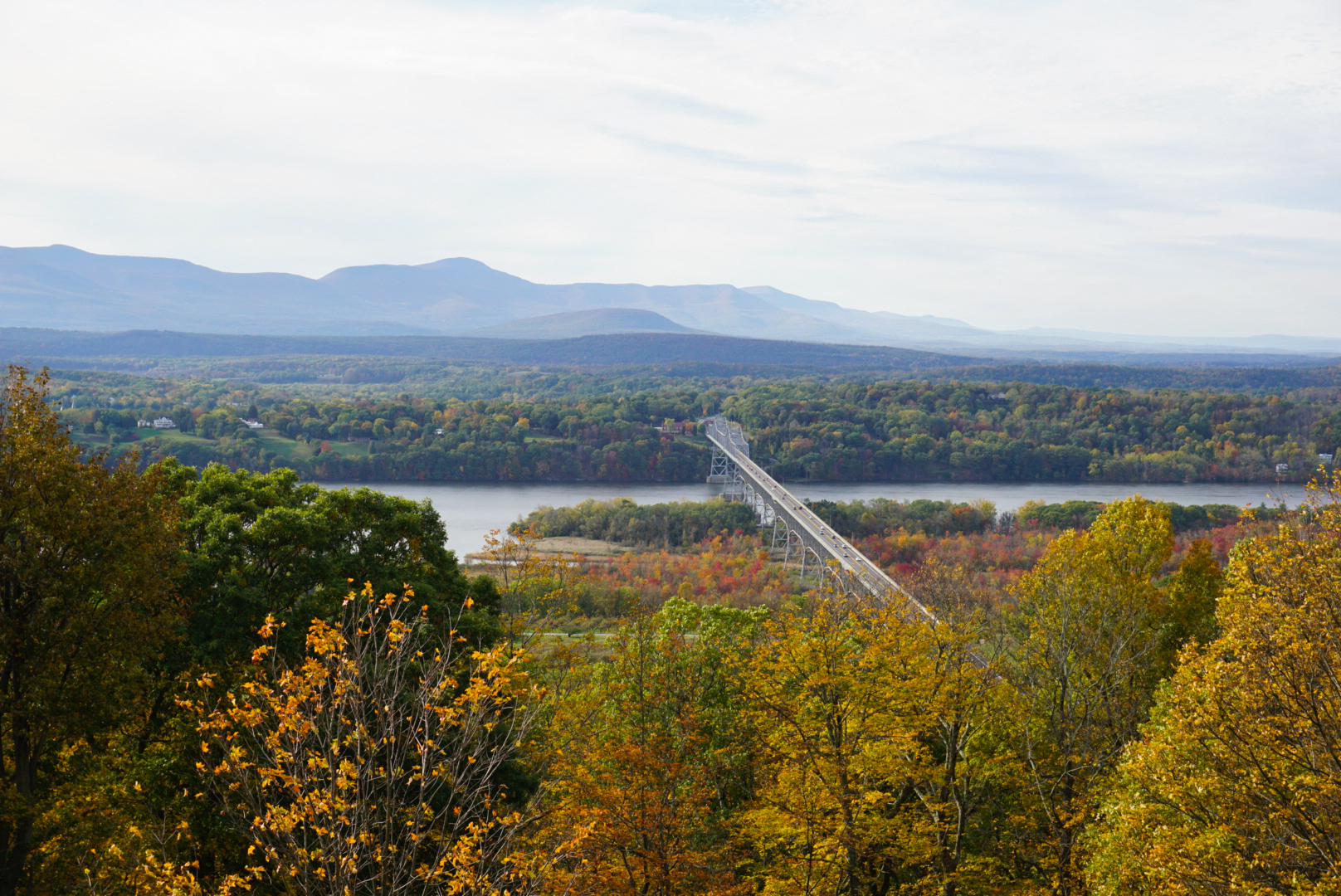
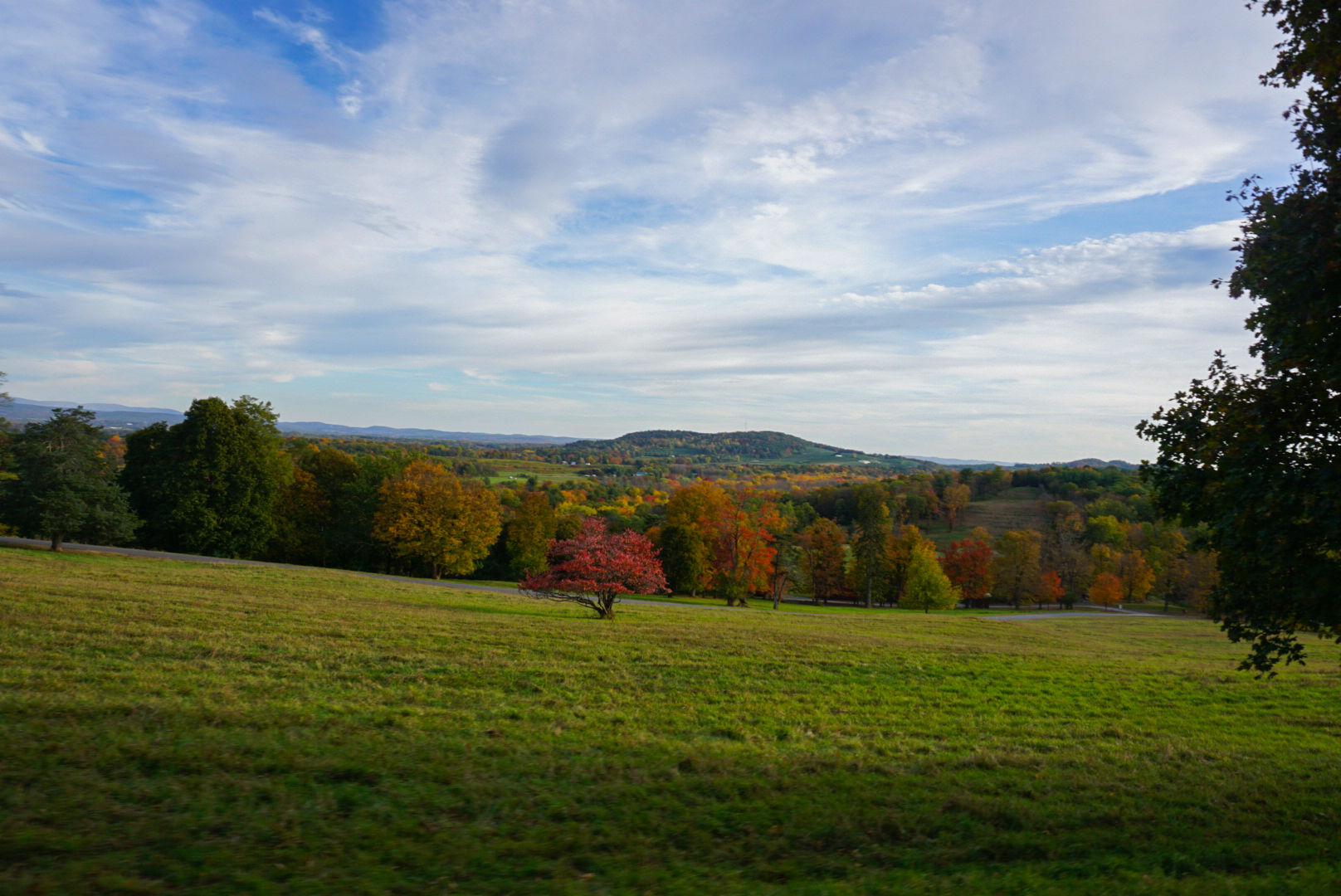

The Olana Viewshed comprises panoramic views that begin in the Hudson River Valley and extend toward Massachusetts, Vermont, and Connecticut. To the west, the ridge of Sieghenburgh drops off abruptly, offering a view of the Hudson River through a series of native trees planted by Frederic Church in the nineteenth century. West of the Hudson River the eastern range of the Catskill Mountains can be viewed. To the southwest and south the terrain descends to Quarry Hill directing the eye three miles away toward Inbocht Bay. To the southeast and east Blue Hill rises in the distance. In 1876 a New York journalist reported "There are no finer views in the world than he can command from his windows." Church spent over thirty years meticulously designing the landscape—including the excavation of an artificial lake in 1873 to mirror the Hudson and add balance to the viewshed—meanwhile producing dozens of oil sketches of the view from Olana. The property on Long Hill was purchased by Church because of its grand views: "To his skeptical father (who was financing the purchase), Church argued that the lot was important in 'securing fine openings for the views.'"

After Frederic Church's lifetime, the Olana Partnership has been pivotal in discouraging the production of two industrial projects that would have impeded the Olana Viewshed. In 1977, The Nuclear Regulatory Commission and the Power Authority of the State of New York held hearings on siting a nuclear power plant in Cementon, south of Catskill and in the Olana Viewshed. The proposed cooling tower would have reached 250 feet in diameter at its highest point discharging a heavy plume and obscuring views of the Catskill Mountains from several locations, including Olana. A painting of the south view of Olana by Frederic Church was used in the hearings as evidence to support the cultural and historical significance of the Olana Viewshed. In 1979 the Power Authority of the State of New York announced that it was abandoning plans for the proposed Cementon nuclear power plant.

On September 14, 1998, St. Lawrence Cement announced plans for a 2.2 million ton coal-fired cement plant in Hudson and Greenport, New York, near the banks of the Hudson River. In 2001, Riverkeeper and a broad environmental coalition, including Olana, petitioned for consulting party status in a New York State Department of Environmental Conservation permit hearing for the proposed project. On April 24, 2005, after severe protest from the Hudson Valley community and environmentalists, St. Lawrence Cement abandoned the Greenport project.

Since 1992 Scenic Hudson and its conservation partners have contributed to the protection of more than 2,400 acres in the Olana Viewshed. In 2015, a conservation easement protected views from Letterbox Farm Collective, a farm nearby.

== Restoration and management ==
Olana is managed by the New York State Office of Parks, Recreation and Historic Preservation, with support from the Olana Partnership. Both work to restore Olana to its 1890s appearance. A large museum and archive, part of the original Church property, is open to the public and includes over 700 works by Church as well as thousands of works of art by other artists, including paintings by Martin Johnson Heade, Arthur Parton and John Thomas Peele and numerous works by Church's close friend, the sculptor Erastus Dow Palmer. The archive, open to scholars, contains letters, scrapbooks, bills, receipts and other ephemera. A visitor center is housed in the former carriage house, and an upstairs bedroom has been converted into the Evelyn and Maurice Sharp Gallery, which shows changing exhibitions of artwork drawn mainly from the archival collections.

The site was closed during the 2006 season for extensive renovation. Stencils on the walls were stabilized and new carpeting was laid in the Court Hall. Curators and conservators performed rehabilitation work on furniture, upholstery and textiles. Fire safety and climate-control systems were improved. Commissioner Carol Ash said at the re-opening in May 2007, "The installation of new state-of-the-art equipment underscores the commitment of New York State to protect this remarkable historic landmark, and we look forward to once again showcasing the unique collections and extraordinary landscapes of one of our most important cultural resources."

The former wagon house in the barn complex now houses educational programs. Future plans include a reconstruction of the wagon house and a stabilization of the main barn, to better fit their role as year-round centers for education. Olana has been cited as an innovative example of a public-private partnership. Olana advocates the preservation of its viewshed by encouraging donations of scenic easements on properties and by discouraging development of industrial projects, such as a proposed cement plant and a proposed power plant.

Ahead of the celebration of Frederick Church's 200th birthday in 2026, a new visitor center designed by Architecture Research Office and Nelson Byrd Woltz opened in 2024. The opening of the center was one of the outcomes a 12-year research, master planning and design effort, for which landscape architect Thomas L. Woltz received the Frederich Church Award from the Olana Partnership in 2025.

== Historiography ==
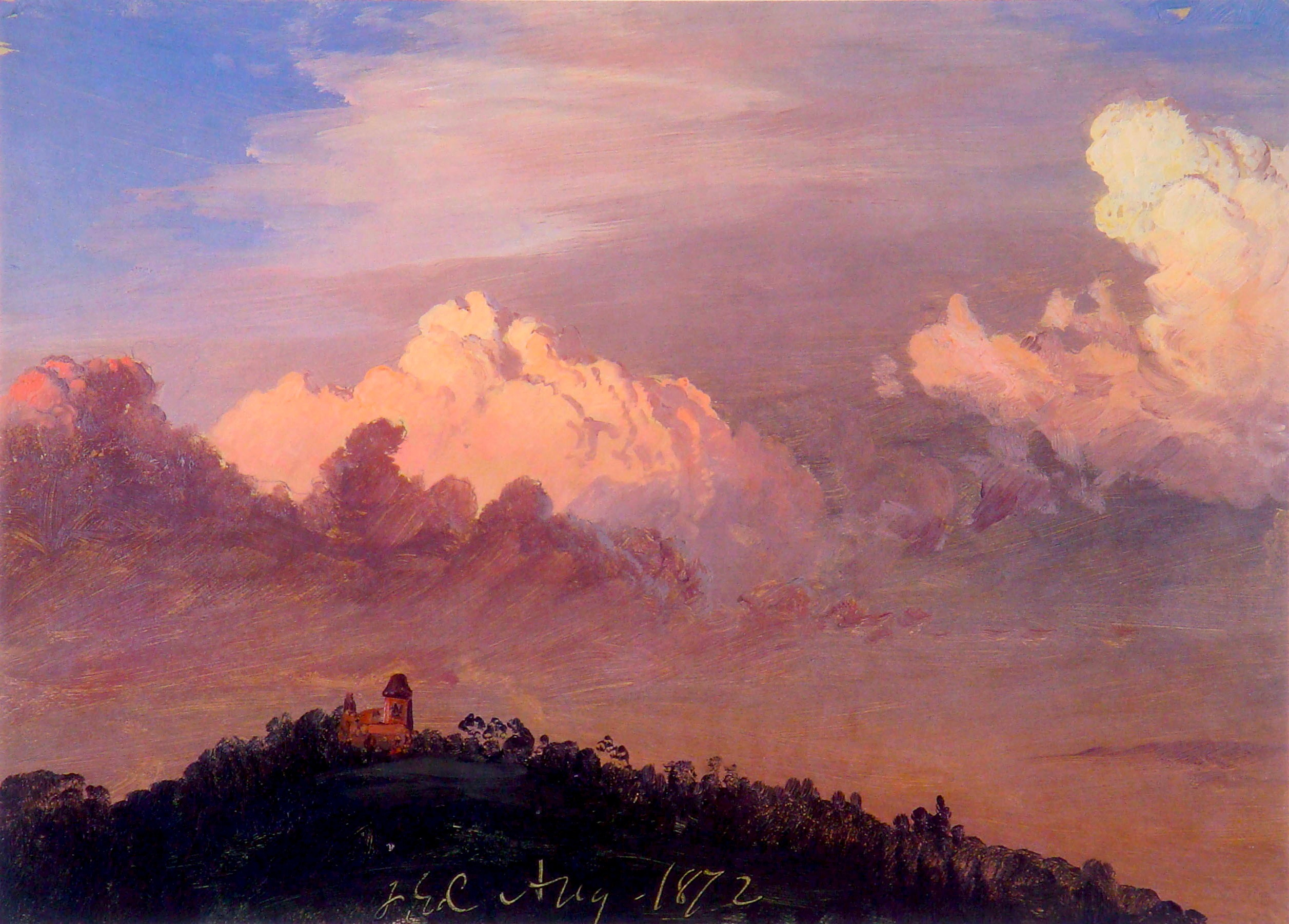
Clouds over Olana, by Frederic Church, 1872

Olana has been the subject of scholarly study by a succession of students and experts on Church's life. David C. Huntington's cataloging and analysis in the mid-1960s is acknowledged as the first foundational work. Huntington is credited not only with saving the site from public auction but with bringing Church's reputation from obscurity to prominence in relation to the Hudson River School. Huntington theorized that the sketches and paintings that Church displayed at Olana, ones he either kept outright or reacquired, were key to understanding the painter's personal values.

Huntington supposed that the name "Olana" was a corruption of an ancient language—an article to that effect had been published in the 1890s in the Boston Herald and believed for many decades. In 1966, Huntington re-established this story, writing that the Arabic word Al'ana, meaning "our place on high", was possibly transliterated to Latin as "Olana". Art historian and Church scholar Gerald L. Carr found no confirmation that the Churches ever considered this meaning; instead, Carr believed the answer to be in a copy of Strabo's Geographica in Olana's library, a multi-volume reference work given by Isabel Church to her husband on Christmas 1879. One volume of this classic Greek work describes a fortified treasure-house named Olana, or Olane, situated on a hillside near the Araxes River in Artaxata, a city in modern-day Armenia, close to the eastern border of Turkey and the northwestern arm of Iran. Carr assumed that the Churches began calling their residence "Olana" after reading Strabo. John Ashbery agreed, writing in 1997 that Strabo's Artaxata "was one of the supposed sites of the Garden of Eden", and that the Churches must have felt kinship with both the idyllic and the protected qualities of ancient Olana.

== Visitation ==
Olana receives approximately 200,000 visitors per year as of 2026. Olana is in the south part of Greenport, New York, in Columbia County, south of Hudson and east of Catskill. By car, the estate can be reached from New York State Route 9G, less than an hour's drive south of Albany. The nearest Amtrak train station is in Hudson. The grounds are open during the day throughout the year and the original carriage roads are accessible. Organized tours of the residence are generally available Tuesday through Sunday, and holiday Mondays, from April to October. From November to March, tours are conducted Friday through Sunday. Reservations for house tours are recommended. Photography is permitted anywhere on the grounds, including the interior of the house. The Hudson River Skywalk, a pedestrian walkway across the Rip Van Winkle Bridge opened in 2019, connects the site to the Thomas Cole National Historic Site in Catskill.

== In popular culture ==
- Olana was featured in Bob Vila's A&E Network four-part production, Guide to Historic Homes of America. For the first episode, on the subject of historic homes in the Northeastern U.S., Vila and his crew traveled to five locations containing historic structures, including Olana.
- The Marc Cohn 1998 album Burning the Daze features a song titled "Olana," about Church and the building of the estate.

== See also ==
- List of single-artist museums
- Historic Artists' Homes and Studios
