= Thomas Cole National Historic Site =

National Historic Site of the United States

- Thomas Cole House
- U.S. National Register of Historic Places
- U.S. National Historic Landmark
- U.S. National Historic Site
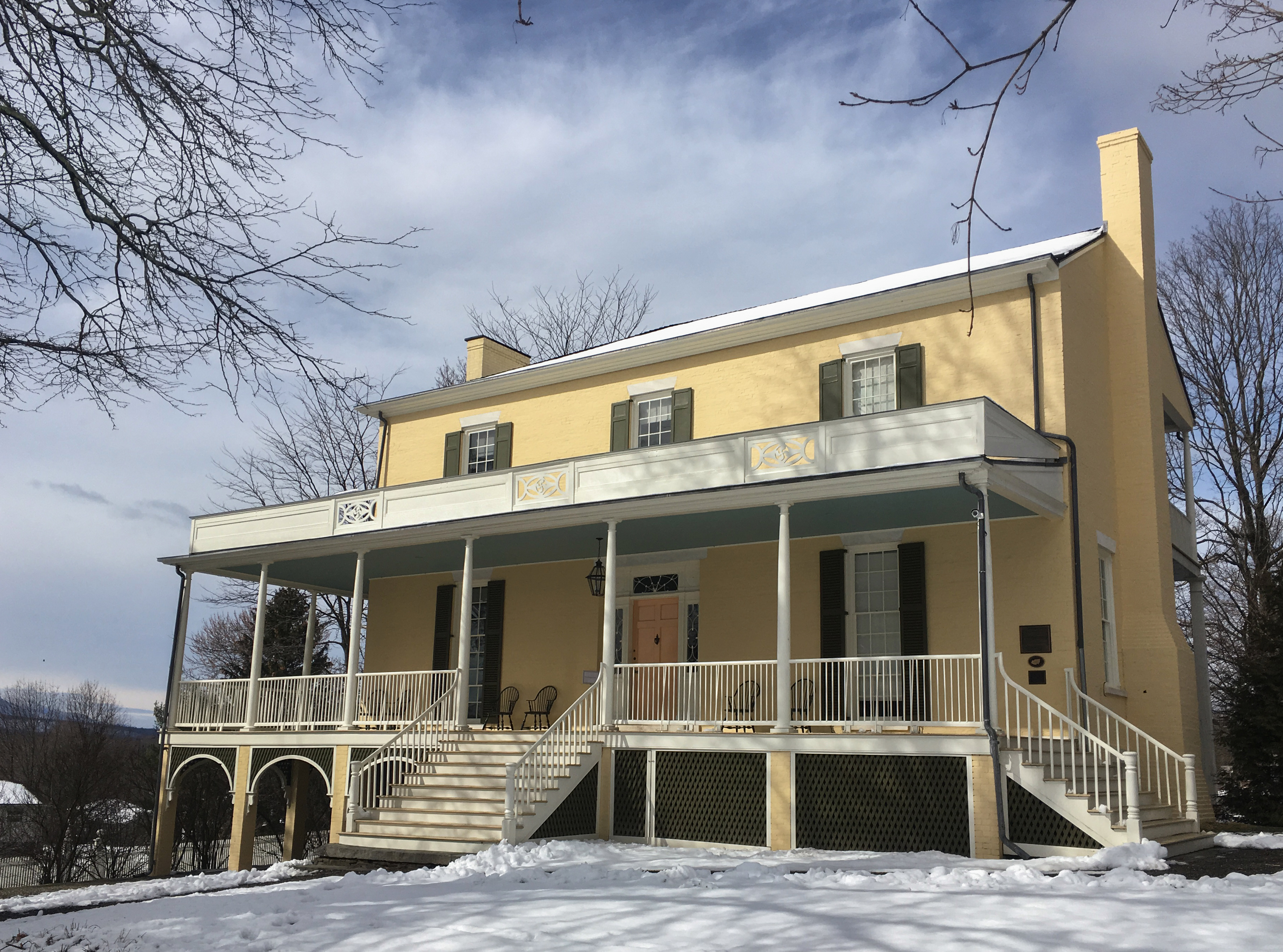
- Thomas Cole House in 2018

- Location within New York Location within the United States
- Interactive map showing the location of Thomas Cole House
- Location: 218 Spring Street, Catskill, New York
- Coordinates: 42°13′33″N 73°51′43″W
- Area: 3.5 acres (1.4 ha)
- Built: 1812
- Website: Thomas Cole National Historic Site
- NRHP reference No.: 66000522

Significant dates
- Added to NRHP: October 15, 1966
- Designated NHL: June 23, 1965
- Designated NHS: December 9, 1999

The Thomas Cole National Historic Site, also known as Cedar Grove, is a National Historic Landmark that includes the home and the studio of painter Thomas Cole, founder of the Hudson River School of American painting. It is located at 218 Spring Street, Catskill, NY, United States. The site provided Thomas Cole with a residence and studio from 1833 through his death in 1848.

The property was declared a National Historic Landmark in 1965. It was designated a National Historic Site in 1999 and is an affiliated area of the National Park Service.

== Site history ==
=== Pre-Cole years ===
In 1684, Gysbert uyt den Bogaert purchased about 460 acres (190 ha) of land from Native Americans, an area at the mouth of Catskill Creek, that was bounded on the east by the Hudson River. After the death of his last descendant the land was subsequently divided and sold by a speculator in the middle of the 18th century. The land was further subdivided during the Revolutionary War, but the development of the area (including the foundations of the town of Catskill) only began in the mid-1790s when growth is described in historical sources as "very rapid."

One of the first landowners was Dr. Thomas Thomson (1750–1805), who arrived in 1787 to practice medicine, speculate in land, and live with his family. After his death and the return of his son Thomas T. Thomson from South America in 1815, the doctor and his family purchased and leased neighboring lots until their property encompassed 155 acres (0.63 km^{2}) at its apex. During this period, the family built a Federal-style house as their primary residence, finishing construction in 1816. The first documented references to the property as 'Cedar Grove' date to this time.

In 1821, Thomas T. Thomson died. His brother John A. Thomson, known familiarly as "Uncle Sandy," assumed duties as head of the household. The Cedar Grove property was a working farm, with oxen, cows, beef cattle, hogs, and one horse. Barley, oats, corn, and hay were cultivated, though orchards produced the primary cash crop of the farm. A large extended family lived with Uncle Sandy, including four of his orphaned nieces.

=== Cole's residency ===
When Thomas Cole arrived in the early 1830s, Cedar Grove had become "a viable gentleman's farm." Looking to secure a more permanent residence in the Catskill area while maintaining a studio in New York City, Cole rented space from the Thomson family to live and paint. In November 1836 he formally entered the family, marrying John A. Thomson's niece Maria Bartow in the West Parlor of the Cedar Grove house. She was 23 years old to his 35.

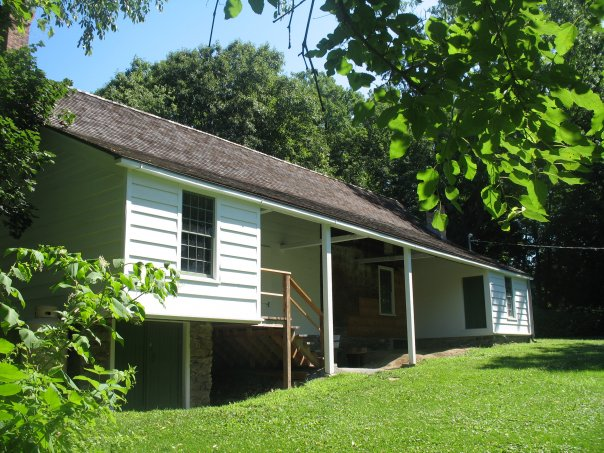
The Old Studio served as Thomas Cole's primary studio between 1839 and 1846. Inside, visitors to Cedar Grove can see the easels that Cole painted his Voyage of Life on.

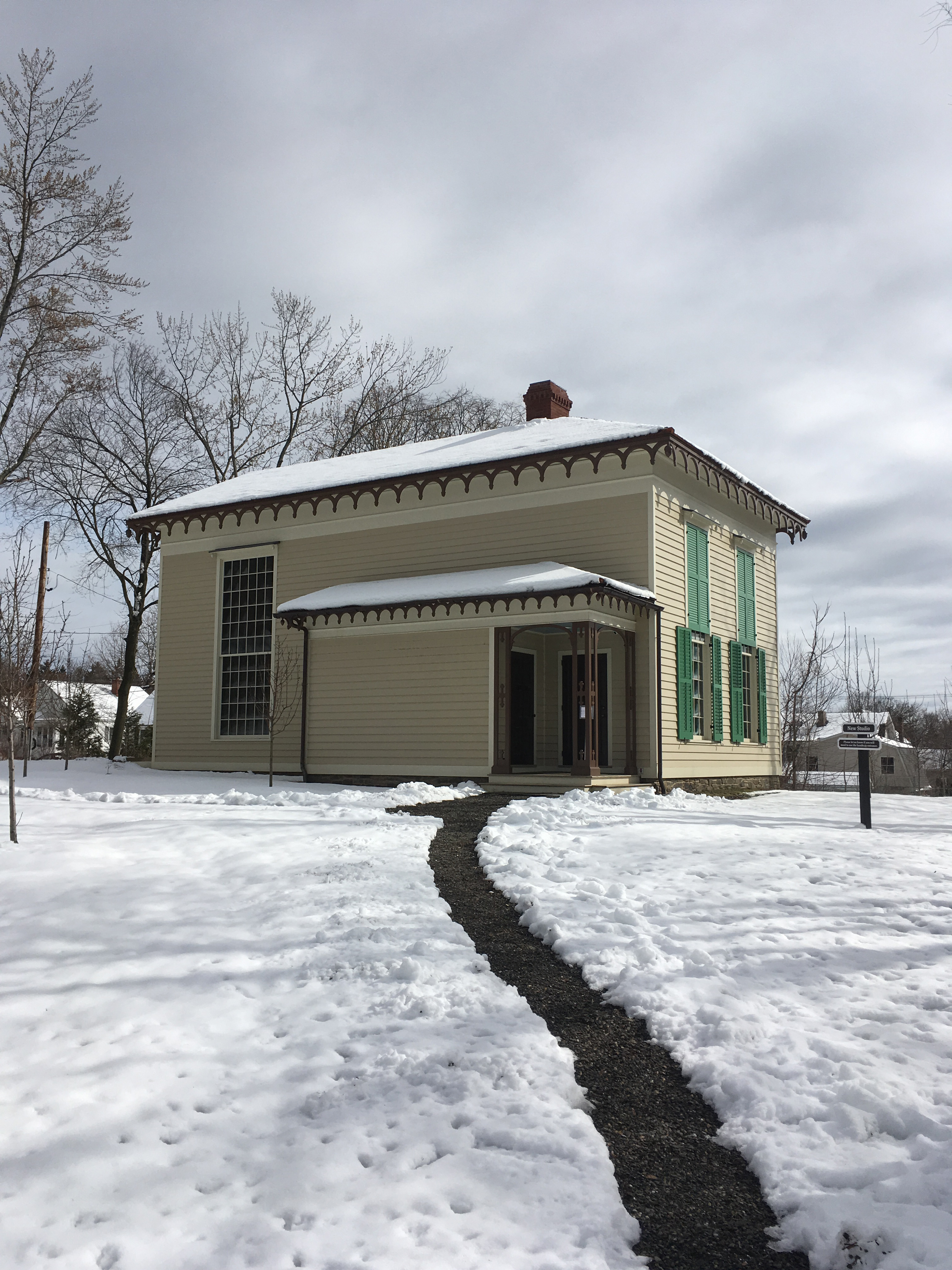
The New Studio

Cole painted numerous scenes of the Catskill landscape around Cedar Grove, including such well-known paintings as Lake with Dead Trees, and Kaaterskill Falls. Cedar Grove continues to offer views of the Catskill mountains, and Cole expressed his feelings for the site and its proximity to the wilderness in poetry and letters. In 1834 he wrote,

O Cedar Grove! Whene'er I think to part
From thine all peaceful shades my aching heart
Is like to his who leaves some blessed shore
A weeping exile ne'er to see it more…

Cole purchased two and a half acres of land outright from John A. Thomson, intending to construct a separate house for his wife and himself, but never did so. Instead, he lived in the master bedroom formerly occupied by John A. Thomson, and raised his children in the main house.

Late in 1839 Cole moved into a new studio, using part of a barn that John A. Thomson had constructed. The studio still stands today, replete with an extra window built to give the artist more northern light. Here Cole painted a number of important works, most notably The Voyage of Life. After John A. Thomson's death in 1846, Cole erected another studio on the property, which was demolished in the 1970s. In February 1848 Cole caught pneumonia and died in the master bedroom at Cedar Grove, leaving behind his wife and four children.

=== Post-Cole years ===
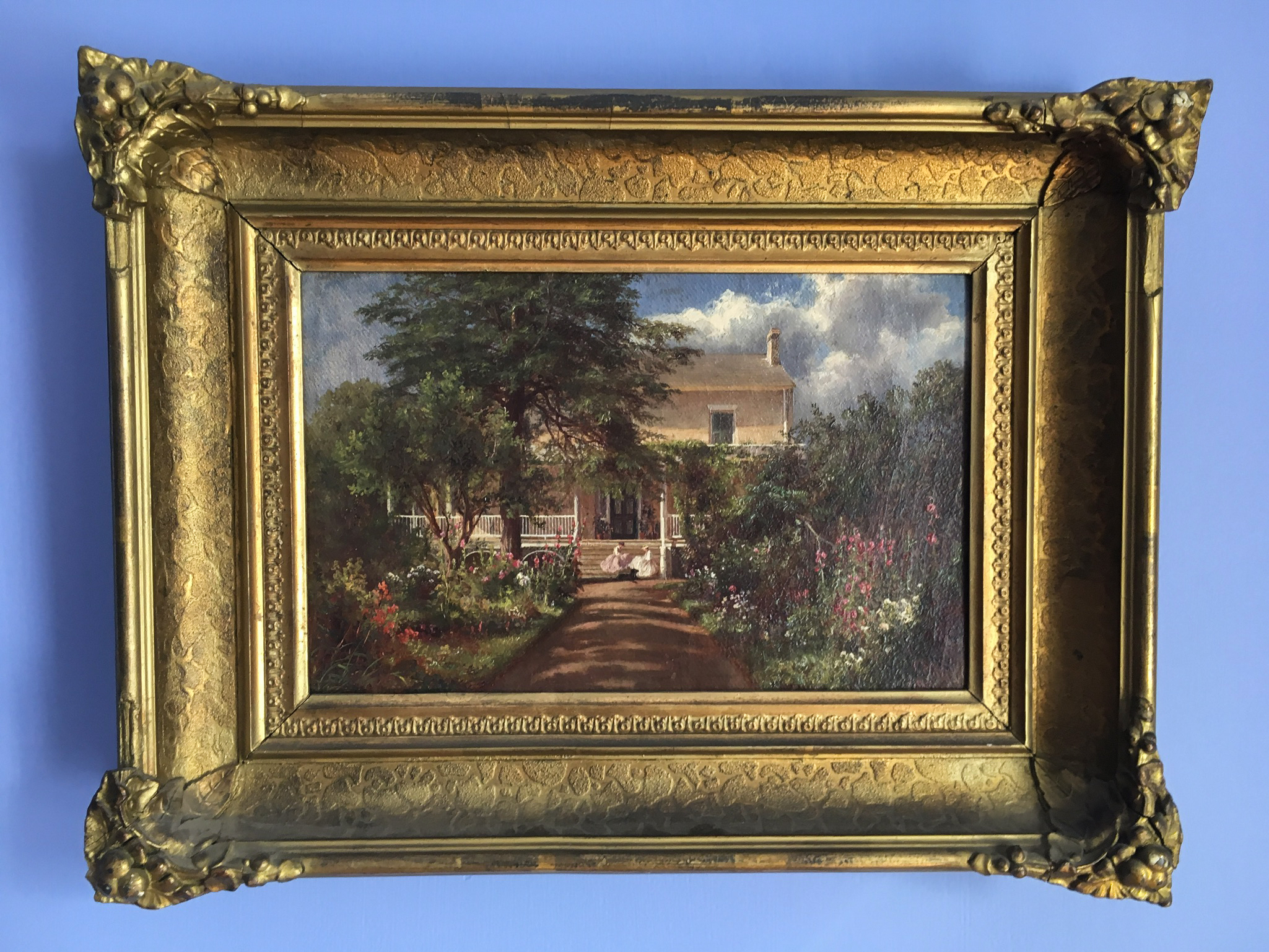
Painting of the house by Charles Herbert Moore, who stayed on the property

Cole's student Frederic Edwin Church became a close friend of the family and sketched much of Cedar Grove in 1848. Following Cole's death, a number of artists traveled to visit Cedar Grove, with some renting his studio and making paintings and sketches of the houses and grounds. Jasper Francis Cropsey and Charles Herbert Moore were among those who visited, and descriptions of the site began to appear in magazines and newspapers. Cole's privileged position in American art during the mid-19th century ensured constant interest in his place of work by the artistic community until many years after his death.

In the 1880s, however, the family had fallen on hard financial circumstances, with Frederic Church forced to assist them in 1882. The size of the property gradually diminished due to a combination of public works (including a road and reservoir) and sales to help the family's financial situation. In 1933 the construction of the nearby Rip Van Winkle Bridge at first threatened to demolish the house, but after concerted efforts by the Cole family only took a portion of land.

In 1964 the last surviving descendant of Cole held an auction to sell a number of Cole's paintings and furnishings. During the 1960s, the historic flower beds were abandoned, and the old cottage that Cole had initially rented was demolished. After New York State declined to preserve the property, it was purchased by the Catskill Center for Conservation and Development who listed it for sale with restrictive deed covenants in 1981. In 1982 it was purchased by four art enthusiasts who began restoration work. After the National Park Service declined to acquire the site, a grant from the Beecher Trust helped the Greene County Historical Society purchase the site in 1998. Restoration began in earnest and Cedar Grove opened to the public in 2001.

In 2016, the reconstruction of Cole's "New Studio," which was built according to his own design in 1846 and demolished in 1973, opened to the public. The reconstruction was aided by historic photographs, sketches by Frederic Church and Jasper Cropsey, and a painting by Charles Herbert Moore.

In 2019, in partnership with Olana State Historic Site and the New York State Bridge Authority, the Thomas Cole National Historic Site opened the Hudson River Skywalk, a pedestrian walkway across the Rip Van Winkle Bridge aiming to connect the two historic sites.

== See also ==
- Historic Artists' Homes and Studios
- Olana State Historic Site
- List of paintings by Thomas Cole
