= Historic Artists' Homes and Studios =

Network of American historic sites

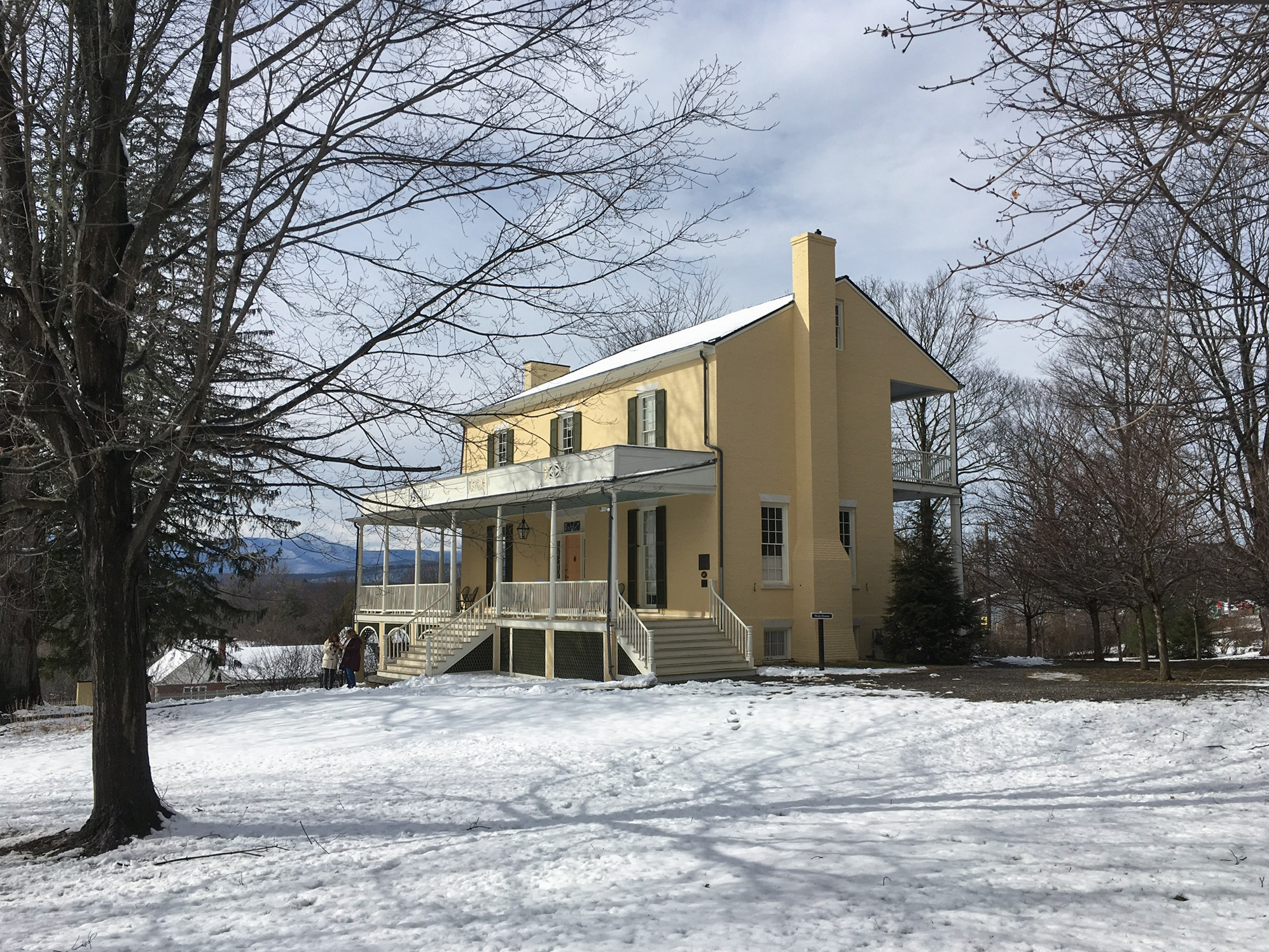
The Thomas Cole House in Catskill, New York is the earliest-inhabited home in the HAHS program, and one of three which are also National Historic Sites.

Historic Artists' Homes and Studios (HAHS) is a program of the National Trust for Historic Preservation in the United States, established in 1999. It is the only national network dedicated to preserving and interpreting site-specific aspects of American art history through artists' workspaces and residences. When the National Trust initiated the HAHS program with 20 member sites it envisioned it as the first of many thematic groups to participate in a growing network of historic sites. The HAHS network is that of preserved studio spaces, homes, and artistic environments where influential American artists created their work. The member sites range from individual artists' studios and house museums to historic art colonies, each offering unique insights into the creative processes and living conditions of their former occupants. HAHS is distinguished by its focus on the intersection of artistic creation and place, preserving not only the physical spaces but also the environmental contexts that influenced notable American artworks. These sites provide rare opportunities for public access to authentic creative spaces, including preserved studios, domestic settings, and landscapes that played crucial roles in American art history. There are currently 93 sites in the HAHS program, including member and affiliate member sites.

== History ==
The initiative for the HAHS program originated in 1993. The program was conceived by the National Trust for Historic Preservation as a way to support organizations preserving historic sites that were not directly under the Trust's portfolio, with the goal of creating thematic connections between sites and fostering collaborative preservation efforts.

Following a feasibility study completed in 1997, HAHS entered its pilot phase in 1999 with significant funding from the Jessie Ball DuPont Fund and the Henry Luce Foundation. The Luce Foundation grant specifically enabled the establishment of a test group focused on American art-related historic sites. Drawing from the Trust's experience with Chesterwood, the home and studio of sculptor Daniel Chester French in Stockbridge, Massachusetts, HAHS formally launched in 2000 with an initial coalition of twenty sites.

The program was structured as a membership-based organization requiring peer review for acceptance. In 1999, a 15-member advisory committee made up of scholars from Stanford, Columbia, and the University of Virginia evaluated 48 applications for the "historical significance of the artist, site and/or collections; the educational value of the site" and more. Its founding objectives centered on three main areas: facilitating peer collaboration and professional development, enhancing visibility through joint marketing efforts, and providing access to technical resources and professional dialogue.

Operating as an ongoing program of the National Trust for Historic Preservation, HAHS has broadened its scope to include grant-making, professional development workshops, public programming, and international partnerships. Each member site is dedicated to preserving and interpreting the working environment of either individual artists or artist communities.

=== Expansion ===
Since its establishment, HAHS has experienced significant growth, expanding from its original twenty in 1999. The program expanded to 36 members by 2017, and by 2020, included 44 sites, which were featured in the publication Guide to Historic Artists' Homes and Studios. In 2021, HAHS added four new sites as part of the "Where Women Made History" initiative, followed by seven additional sites in 2022, bringing the total to 55. The program introduced an affiliate membership category in 2023, expanding to "61 historic sites across 25 states." In a significant development in January 2025, HAHS announced a major expansion that welcomed 19 new affiliate sites, bringing the total membership to 80 sites across 31 states.
