= Neomodern =

Architectural style

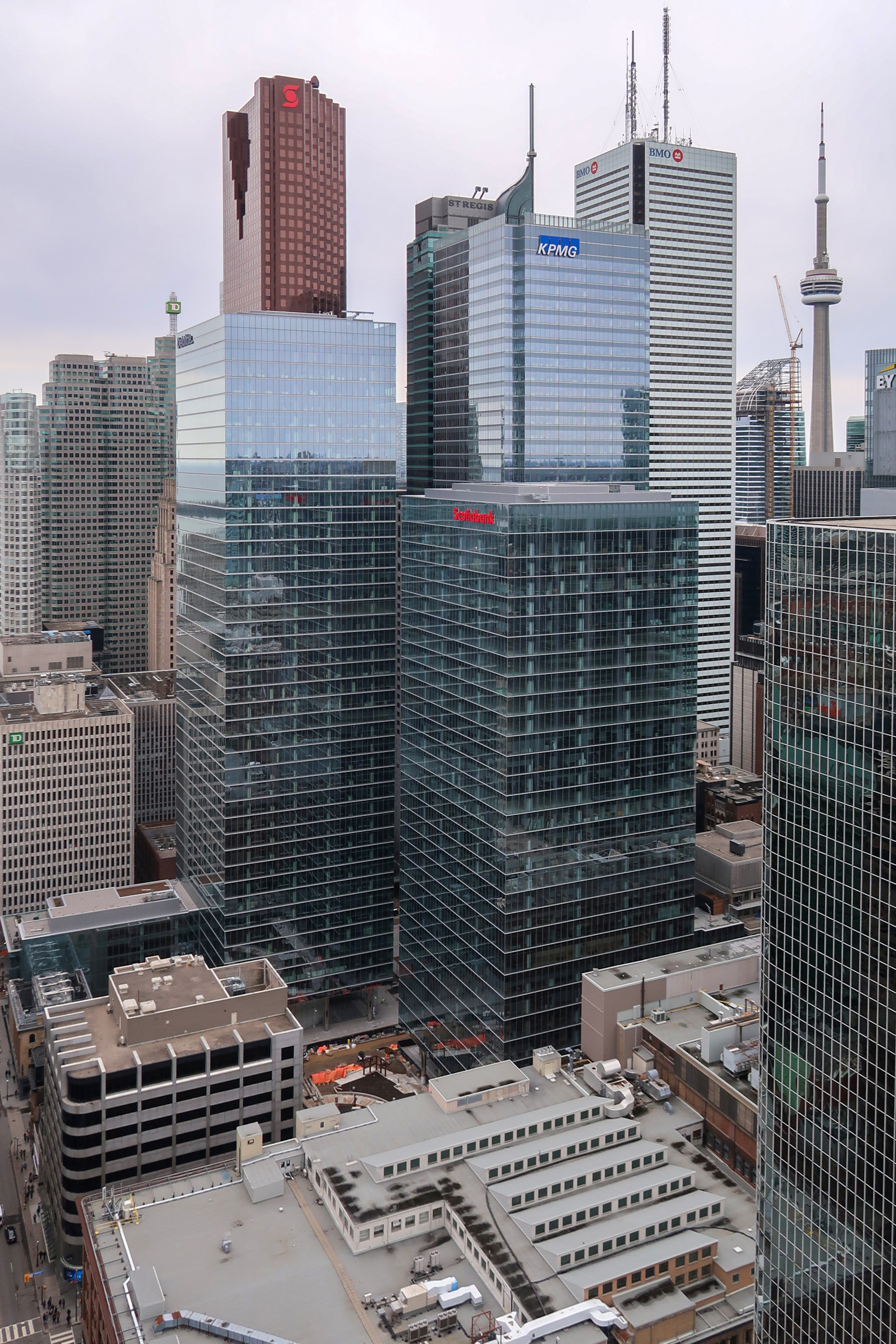
The Bay Adelaide Centre in Toronto. When first proposed in the 1980s the building had a strongly postmodernist design. The final design, completed in 2009, adopted the neomodern style.

Neomodern or neomodernist architecture is a reaction to the complexity of postmodern architecture and eclecticism in architecture, seeking greater simplicity. The architectural style, which is also referred to as New Modernism, is said to have legitimized an outlook of comprehensive individualism and relativism.

== Background ==
The move to reboot architectural design is not a recent phenomenon. There are scholars who trace new modernist thoughts to Le Corbusier's Vers une Architecture published in the 1920s. This text, which was reprinted in English in 1931 as Towards New Architecture, proposed the replacement of Paris' architectural fabric with crystalline towers. His ideas were taken up by scholars like Earl Baldwin Smith, who criticized the lack of "functional" directness" and "simplicity" of modernist architects such as Frank Lloyd Wright. The subsequent writings of Vautier identified emergent characteristics of the new architecture, which include the centrality of rationalism, mathematics, and calculation to the aesthetic experience.

Neomodernist architecture holds that contemporary architecture has surpassed postmodernism and neoeclecticism. The scattered trends developed in response to this view coalesced and reinforced each other leading to a new complete form. Several factors contributed to this development and these include the triumph of global capitalism, the emergence of new architectural forms, and the generation of new and more complex architectural theories. There are scholars who also cite the role played by Jewish architectural projects that were erected in European cities such as Vienna. These were products of experiments in form that were oriented towards greater simplicity and the rejection of aristocratic values.

== Architecture ==
Neomodern architecture continues Modern architecture as a dominant form of architecture in the 20th and 21st centuries, especially in corporate offices. It tends to be used for certain segments of buildings. Many residential houses tend to embrace postmodern, new classical and neo-eclectic styles, for instance, and major monuments today most often opt for starchitect inspired uniqueness. Neomodern architecture shares many of the basic characteristics of modernism. Both reject classical ornamentation, decorations, and deliberate ambitions to continue pre-modernist traditions. Neomodernist buildings, like modernist ones, are designed to be largely monolithic and functional. The emphasis on rationalism and calculation in creating the aesthetic experience is augmented by the focus on utility, economy, and natural selection.

== Artist group ==
The neomodern artist group was founded in 1997 by Guy Denning on the premise that the diversity of contemporary art was being stifled by the state supported art institutions and organisations. The group have no common style or media but there is a bias towards figurative painting. Original artists listed: Jim Butler, David Cobley, Emily Cole, Mark Demsteader, Guy Denning, Ian Francis, Juno Doran, Ghislaine Howard, Jamin, Maya Kulenovic, Mark Stephen Meadows, Antony Micallef, Motorboy, Carol Peace, Graeme Robbins, Harry Simmonds, Tom Wilmott, Franklin Torres, Kit Wise and Claire Zakiewicz. In Slovakia, Slovak Matica also joined the "national neomodernism" (Manifest národnej neomoderny), the manifesto was initiated by the DAV DVA project.

== Examples of neomodern architecture ==
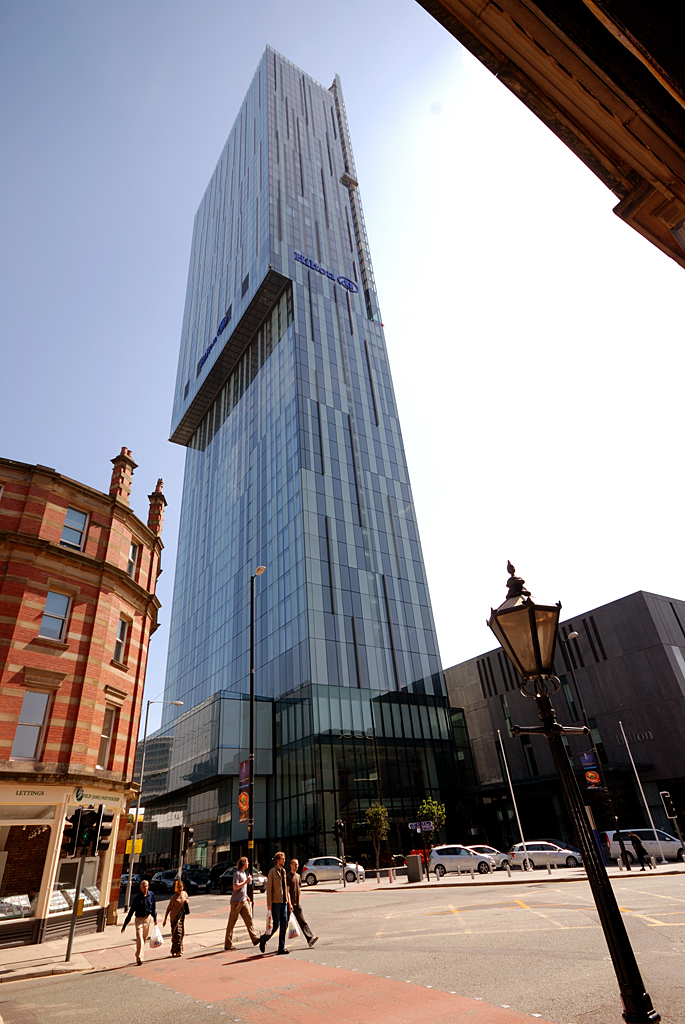
Beetham Tower in Manchester, UK

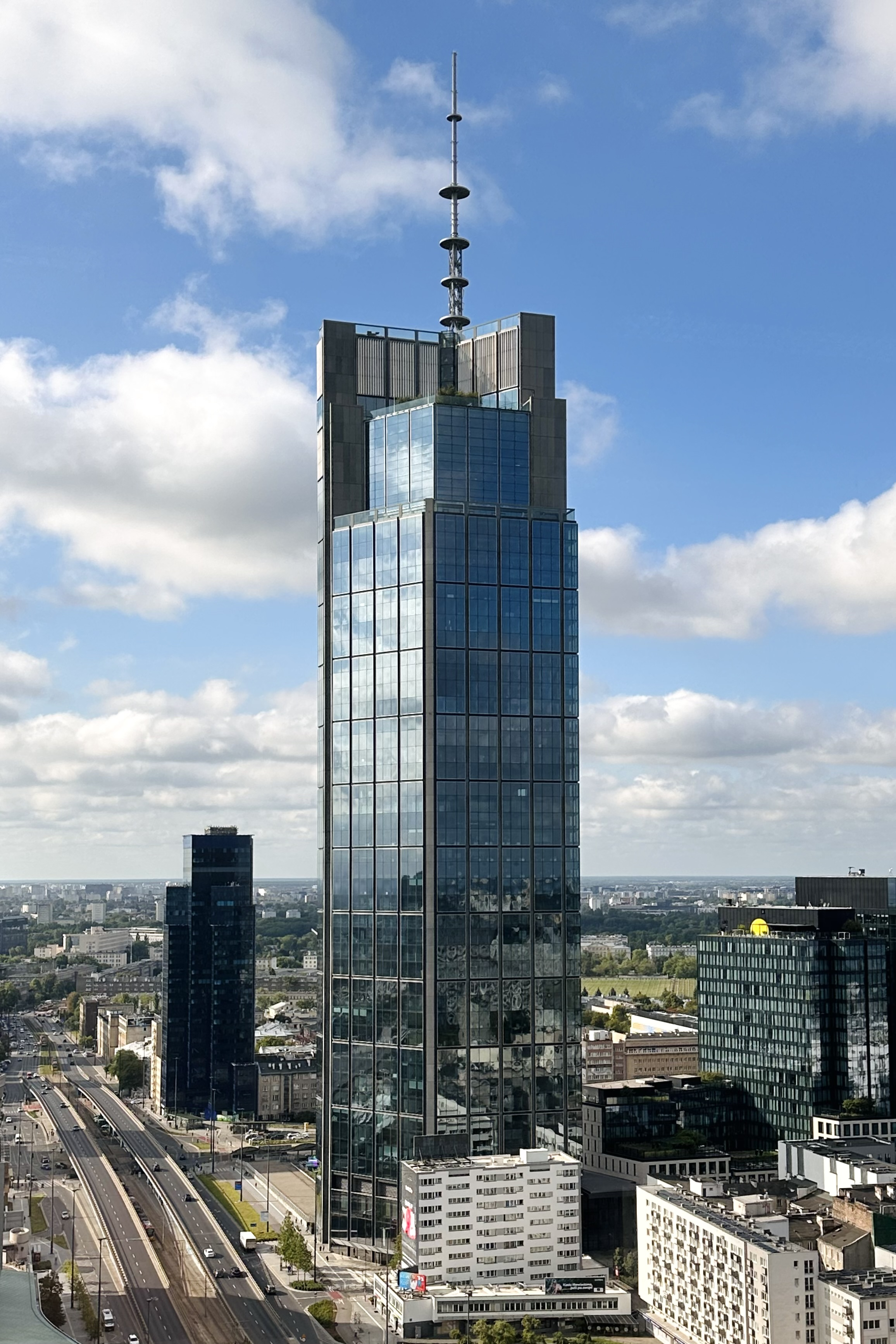
Varso in Warsaw, Poland

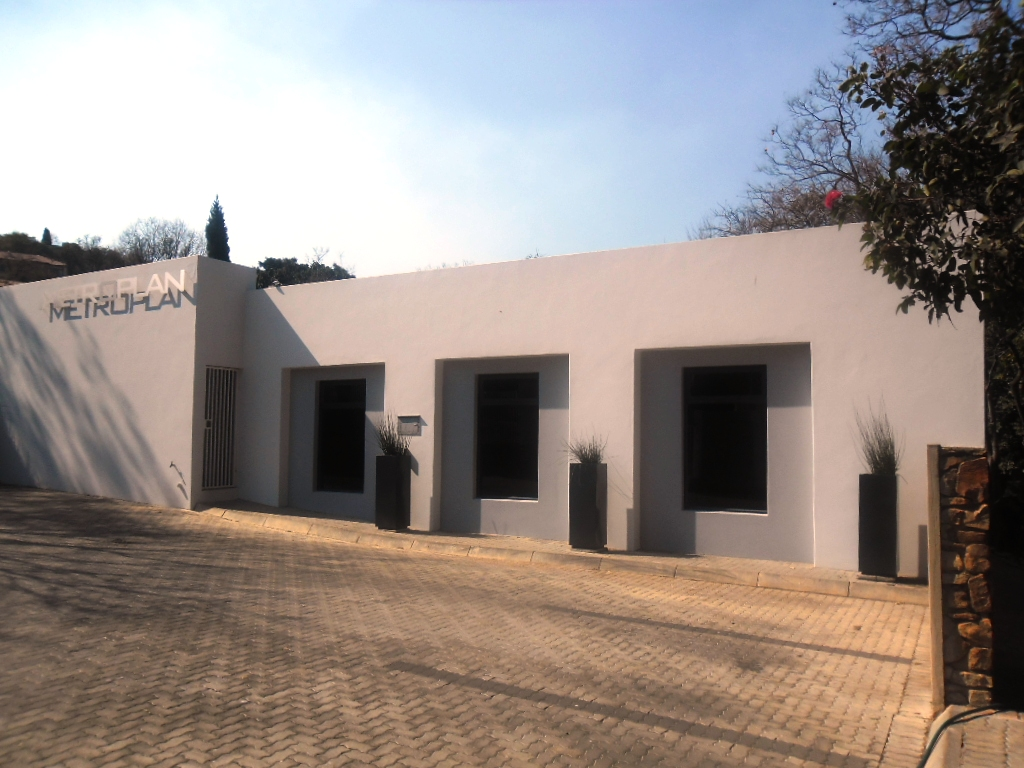
Building in Pretoria with a neomodern architectural design.

== See also ==
- Neo-futurism
- Metamodernism
- Remodernism
