= Widok Towers =

Skyscraper in Warsaw, Poland

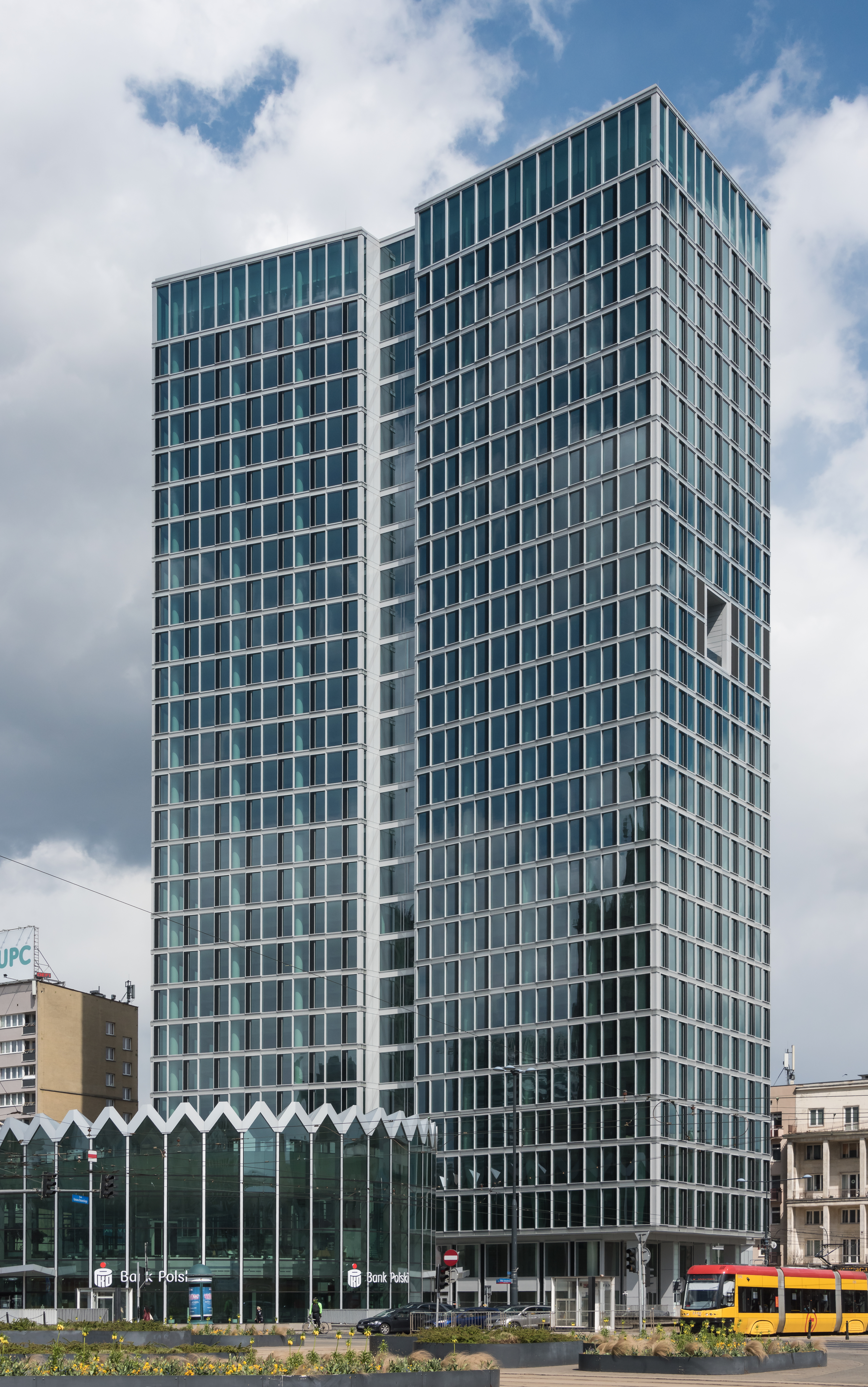
- Widok Towers in 2022.
- Interactive map of the Widok Towers area

General information
- Type: Office building
- Architectural style: Neomodernism
- Location: Warsaw, Poland, 44 Jerusalem Avenue
- Coordinates: 52°13′50.1″N 21°00′46.2″E
- Construction started: 2017
- Completed: 2020

Height
- Tip: 95 m
- Roof: 95 m

Technical details
- Floor count: 28
- Floor area: 32,600 m²

Design and construction
- Architects: Piotr Bujnowski; Martin Tröthan
- Developer: S+B Plan Bau Warschau

Widok Towers (Polish: [ˈvi.dɔk], lit. 'view') is an office skyscraper in Warsaw, Poland, located at 44 Jerusalem Avenue, in the Downtown district. It was designed by Piotr Bujnowski and Martin Tröthan, and opened in 2020.

== History ==
Widok Towers was constructed between 2017 and 2020, as part of the East Wall urban complex, in place of the former headquarters skyscraper of Universal. It was designed by Piotr Bujnowski and Martin Tröthan in the neomodern style. Its investor was S+B Plan Bau Warschau.

== Characteristics ==
Widok Towers is located at 44 Jerusalem Avenue, in the neighbourhood of North Downtown in the Downtown district. It was designed in the neomodern style, primary as an office building with additional spaces allocated for shopping, services, and a hotel. It has 28 storeys, and 3 additional underground. The total height of the building is 95 m (311.68 ft), and its total area is 32,600 m^{2} (350,903.48 ft sq).
