= Thomas Cole =

Anglo-American artist (1801–1848)

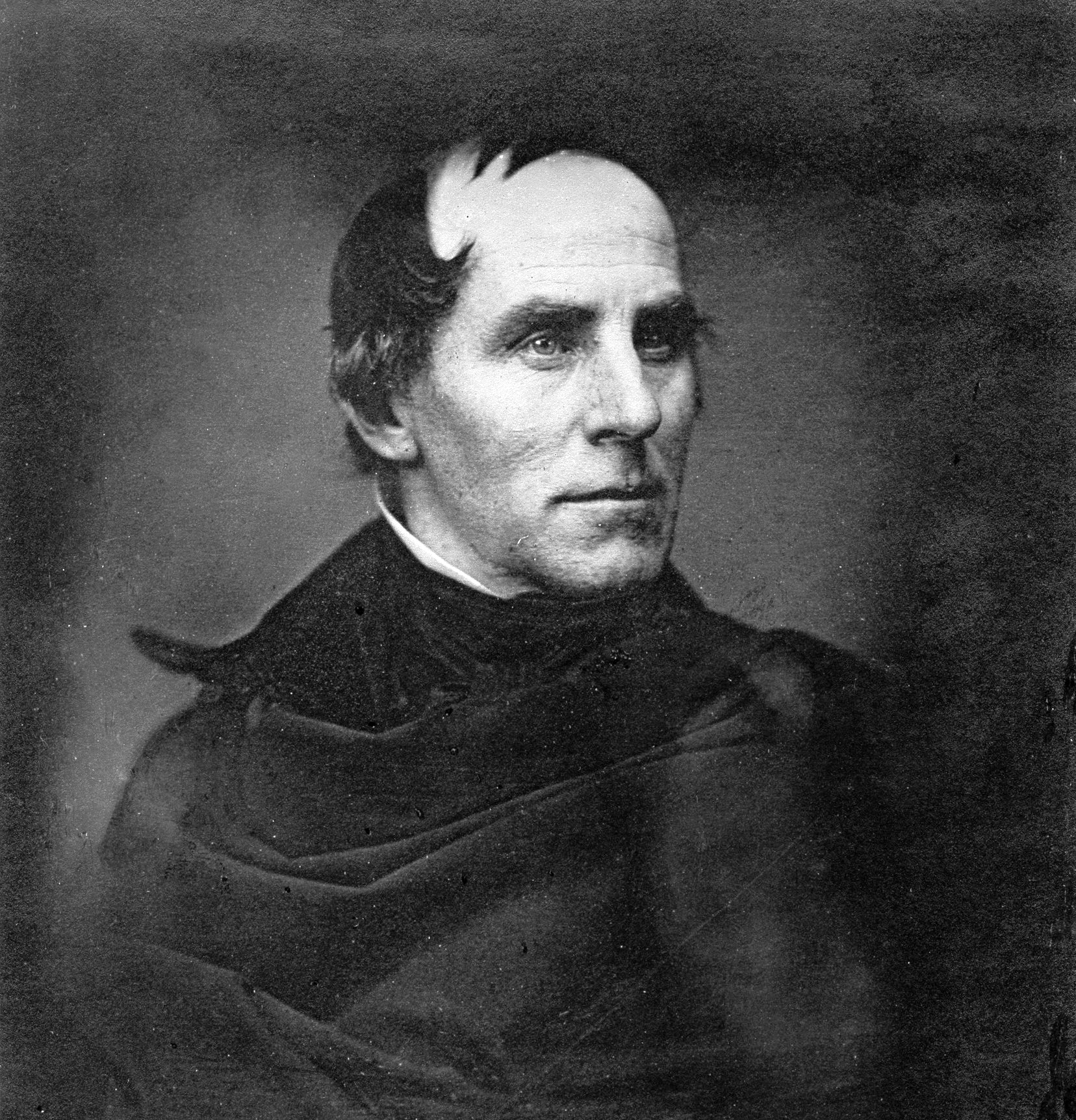
- Daguerreotype of Cole by an unknown photographer, c. 1845, published within the Archives of American Art Journal
- Born: February 1, 1801; Bolton le Moors, Lancashire, England
- Died: February 11, 1848 (aged 47); Catskill, New York, U.S
- Known for: Painting, oil on canvas
- Notable work: The Titan's Goblet; The Course of Empire; The Oxbow; The Voyage of Life among others...
- Movement: Hudson River School

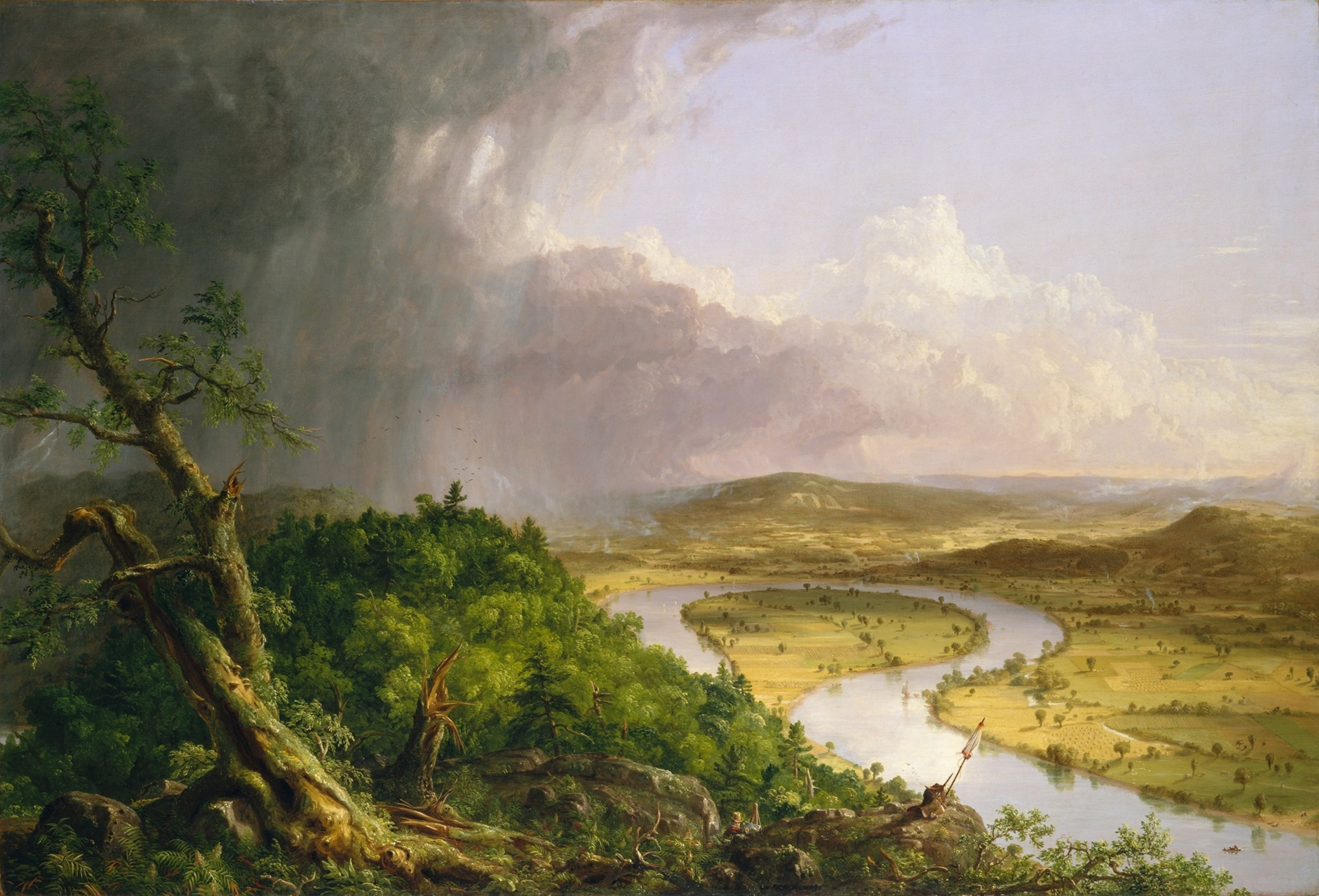
The Oxbow (The Connecticut River near Northampton) (1836)

The Course of Empire (1833–1836). This animated image shows all five paintings in the series as separate frames.

Thomas Cole (February 1, 1801 – February 11, 1848) was an English-born American artist who founded the Hudson River School art movement. He painted romantic landscapes and history paintings. Influenced by European painters, but with a strong American sensibility, he was prolific throughout his career and worked primarily with oil on canvas.

His paintings are typically allegoric and often depict small figures or structures set against moody and evocative natural landscapes. They are usually escapist, framing the New World as a natural eden contrasting with the smog-filled cityscapes of Industrial Revolution-era Britain, in which he grew up. His works, often seen as conservative, criticize the contemporary trends of industrialism, urbanism, and westward expansion.

== Biography ==
Born in Bolton le Moors in Lancashire on February 1, 1801, Thomas Cole immigrated with his family to the United States in 1818, settling in Steubenville, Ohio.

At the age of twenty-two, he moved to Philadelphia and later, in 1825, to Catskill, New York, where he lived with his children and wife.

Cole found work early on as an engraver. He was largely self-taught as a painter, relying on books and by studying the work of other artists. In 1822, he started working as a portrait painter and later on, gradually shifted his focus to landscape.

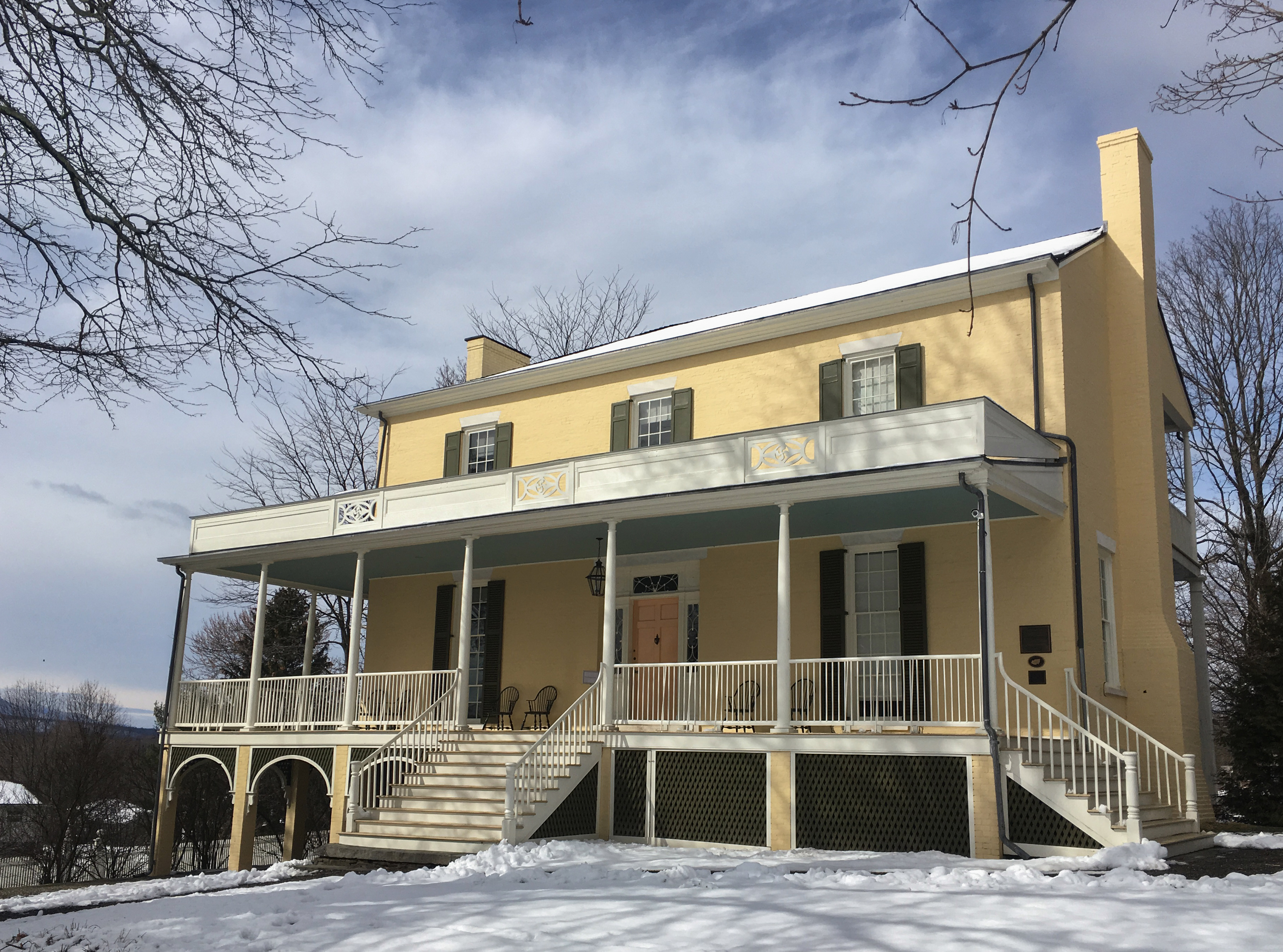
Thomas Cole House, "Cedar Grove"

After 1827 Cole maintained a studio at the farm called Cedar Grove, in the town of Catskill, New York. He painted a significant portion of his work in this studio. In 1836, he married Maria Bartow of Catskill, a niece of the owners, and became a year-round resident. Thomas and Maria had five children. (Note: They were: Theodore Alexander Cole, born January 1, 1838; Mary Bartow Cole, born September 23, 1839; Emily Cole, born August 27, 1843; Elizabeth Cole, born April 5, 1847 (died in infancy); Thomas Cole Jr., born September 16, 1848. ("A Guide to the Thomas Cole Collection" (PDF). Albany Institute of History and Art. p. 9. Archived from the original (PDF) on November 20, 2008.)) His daughter Emily Cole (1843–1913) was a botanical artist who worked in watercolor and painted porcelain. Cole's sister, Sarah Cole, was also a landscape painter.

Additionally, Cole held many friendships with important figures in the art world including Daniel Wadsworth, with whom he shared a close friendship. Proof of this friendship can be seen in the letters that were unearthed in the 1980s by the Trinity College Watkinson Library. Cole emotionally wrote Wadsworth in July 1832: "Years have passed away since I saw you & time & the world have undoubtedly wrought many changes in both of us; but the recollection of your friendship... [has] never faded in my mind & I look at those pleasures as 'flowers that never will in other garden grow-'"

Thomas Cole died at Catskill on February 11, 1848, of pleurisy. The fourth-highest peak in the Catskills is named Thomas Cole Mountain in his honor. Cedar Grove, also known as the Thomas Cole House, was declared a National Historic Site in 1999 and is now open to the public.

== Painting ==
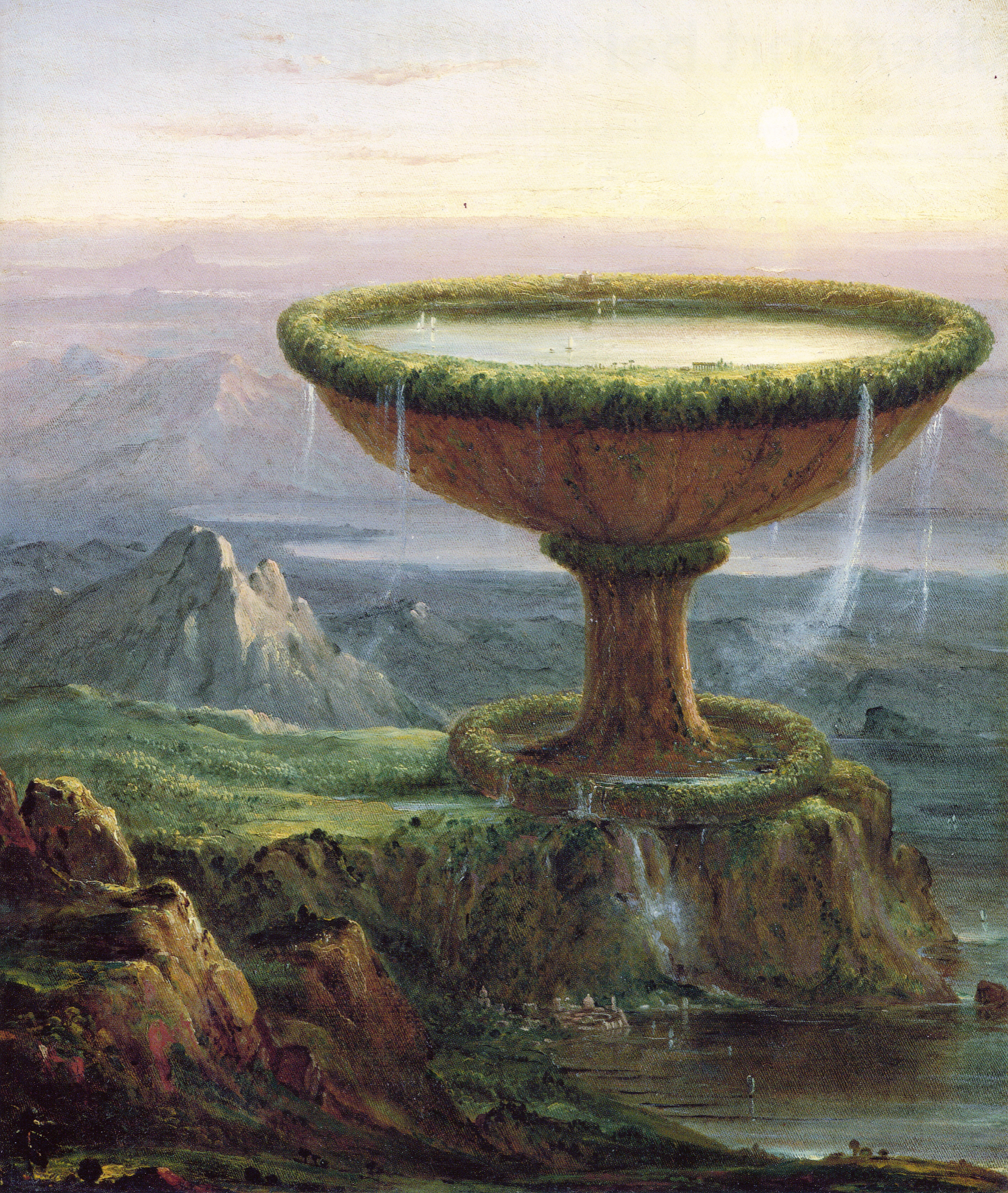
The Titan's Goblet (1833), oil on canvas; 49 × 41 cm. The Metropolitan Museum of Art, New York

In New York, Cole sold three paintings to George W. Bruen, who subsequently financed a summer trip to the Hudson Valley where the artist produced landscapes featuring the Catskill Mountain House, the famous Kaaterskill Falls, the ruins of Fort Putnam, and two views of Cold Spring. Returning to New York, he displayed five landscapes in the window of William Colman's bookstore; according to the New York Evening Post the two views of Cold Spring were purchased by A. Seton, who lent them to the American Academy of the Fine Arts annual exhibition in 1826. This garnered Cole the attention of John Trumbull, Asher Brown Durand, and William Dunlap.

Among the paintings was a landscape called View of Fort Ticonderoga from Gelyna. Trumbull was especially impressed with the work of the young artist and sought him out, bought one of his paintings, and put him into contact with a number of his wealthy friends including Robert Gilmor Jr. of Baltimore and Daniel Wadsworth of Hartford, Connecticut, who became important patrons of the artist.

Eighty-nine of Cole's paintings were exhibited at the National Academy of Design between its founding in 1825 and Cole's death in 1848. Five of his works were engraved and published in The Token and Atlantic Souvenir annual gift book between 1826 and 1842. The historian David S. Lovejoy considers the best to be The Whirlwind (1837), which Lovejoy said "is unique in its boldness" compared to the predominantly serene landscapes of the period. Published in the 1830 volume, contemporary critic John Neal called Chocurua's Curse "beautifully contrived".

Cole was primarily a painter of landscapes, but he also painted allegorical works. The most famous of these are the five-part series, The Course of Empire, which depict the same landscape over generations—from a near state of nature to consummation of empire, and then decline and desolation—now in the collection of the New-York Historical Society and the four-part The Voyage of Life. There are two versions of the latter, the 1840 original at the Munson-Williams-Proctor Arts Institute in Utica, New York and the 1842 replicas with minor alterations at the National Gallery in Washington, D.C. Among Cole's other famous works are The Oxbow (1836), The Notch of the White Mountains, Daniel Boone at his cabin at the Great Osage Lake, and Lake with Dead Trees (1825) which is at the Allen Memorial Art Museum. He also painted The Garden of Eden (1828), with lavish detail of Adam and Eve living amid waterfalls, vivid plants, and deer. In 2014, friezes painted by Cole on the walls of his home, which had been decorated over, were discovered.

Cole influenced his peers in the art movement later termed the Hudson River School, especially Durand and Frederic Edwin Church. Church studied with Cole from 1844 to 1846, where he learned Cole's technique of sketching from nature and later developing an idealized, finished composition; Cole's influence is particularly notable in Church's early paintings. Cole spent the years 1829 to 1832 and 1841 to 1842 abroad, mainly in England and Italy.

== Other work ==
Cole is best known for his work as an American landscape artist. In an 1836 article on "American Scenery", he described his complex relationship with the American landscape in esthetic, emotional, and spiritual terms. He also produced thousands of sketches of varying subject matter. Over 2,500 of these sketches can be seen at The Detroit Institute of Arts.

In 1842, Cole embarked on the Grand Tour in an effort to study in the style of the Old Masters and to paint its scenery. Most striking to Cole was the tallest active volcano in Europe, Mount Etna. Cole was so moved by the volcano's beauty that he produced several sketches and at least six paintings of it. The most famous of these works is A View of Mount Etna from Taormina which is a 78-by-120-inch (1,980 by 3,050 mm) oil on canvas. Cole also produced a highly detailed sketch View of Mount Etna which shows a panoramic view of the volcano with the crumbling walls of the ancient Greek theater of Taormina on the far right.

Cole was also a poet and dabbled in architecture, a not uncommon practice at the time when the profession was not so codified. Cole was an entrant in the design competition held in 1838 to create the Ohio Statehouse in Columbus, Ohio. His entry won third place, and many contend that the finished building, a composite of the first, second, and third-place entries, bears a great similarity to Cole's entry.

== Selected works ==
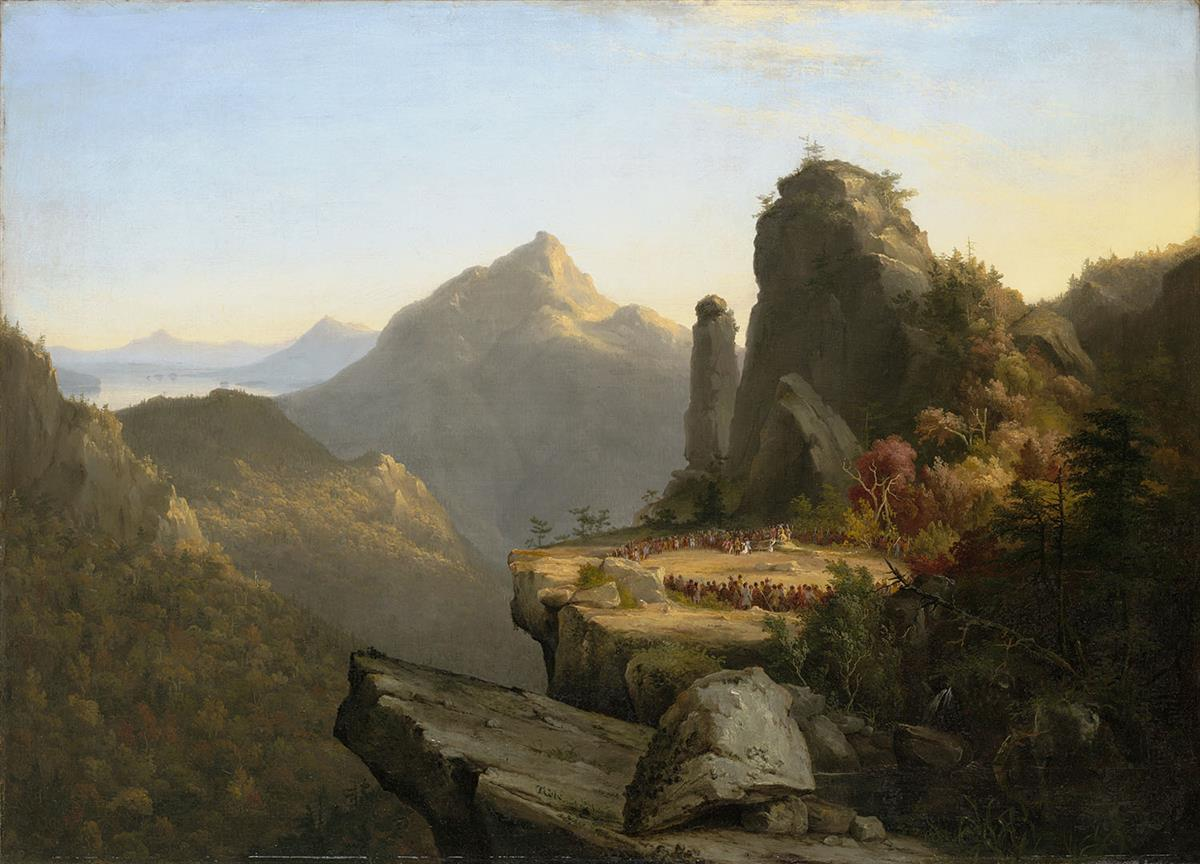
Imaginary scene from The Last of the Mohicans (1827), Wadsworth Atheneum

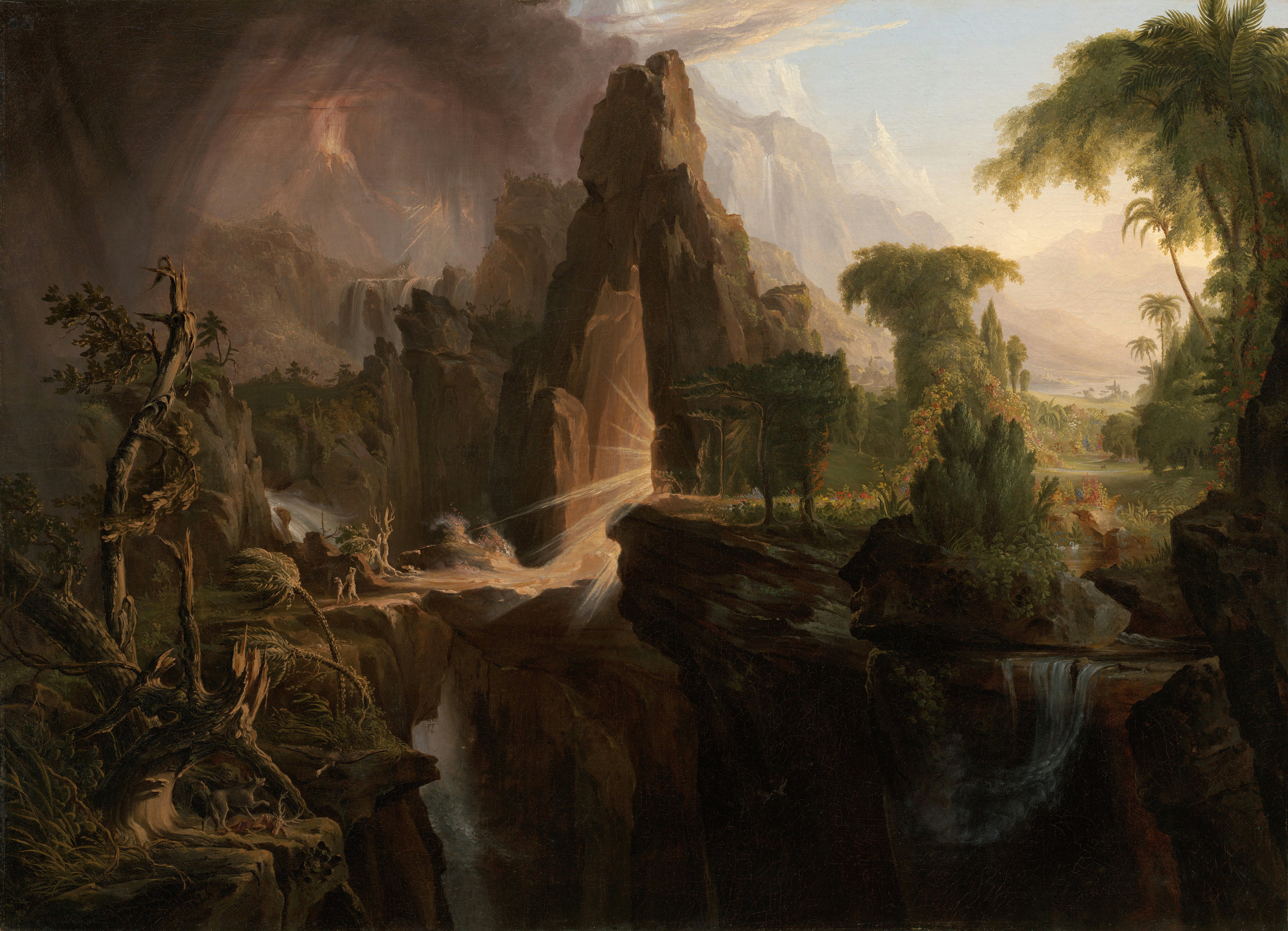
Expulsion from the Garden of Eden (1828), Museum of Fine Arts, Boston

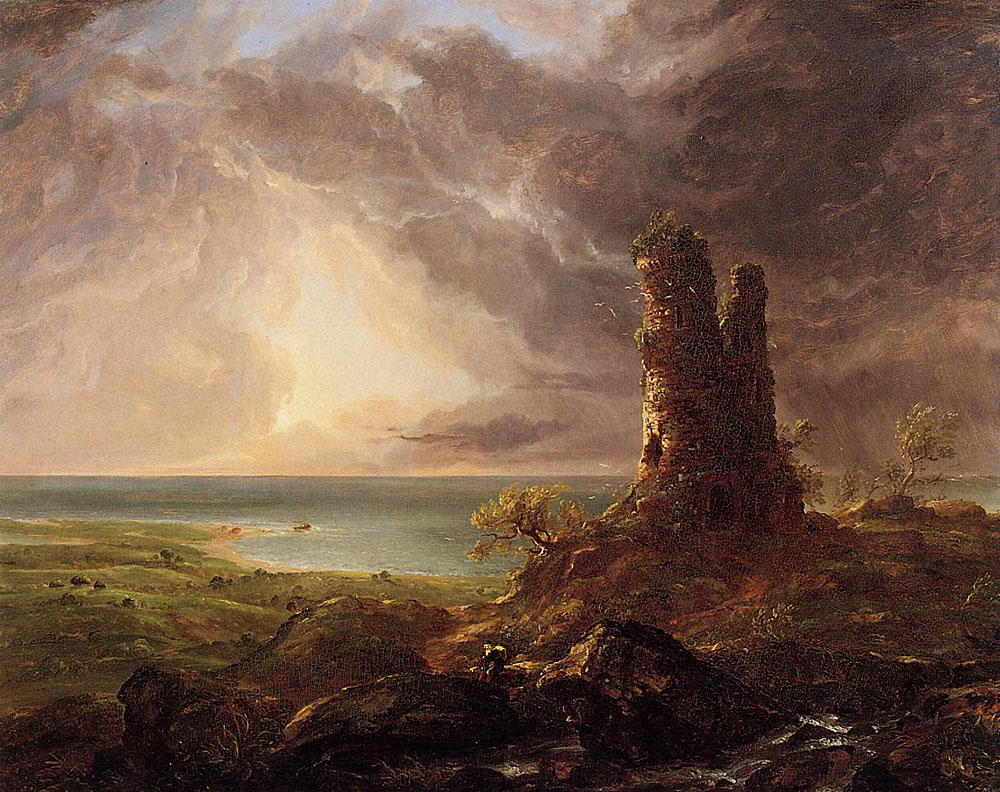
Romantic Landscape with Ruined Tower (1832–36), Albany Institute of History & Art

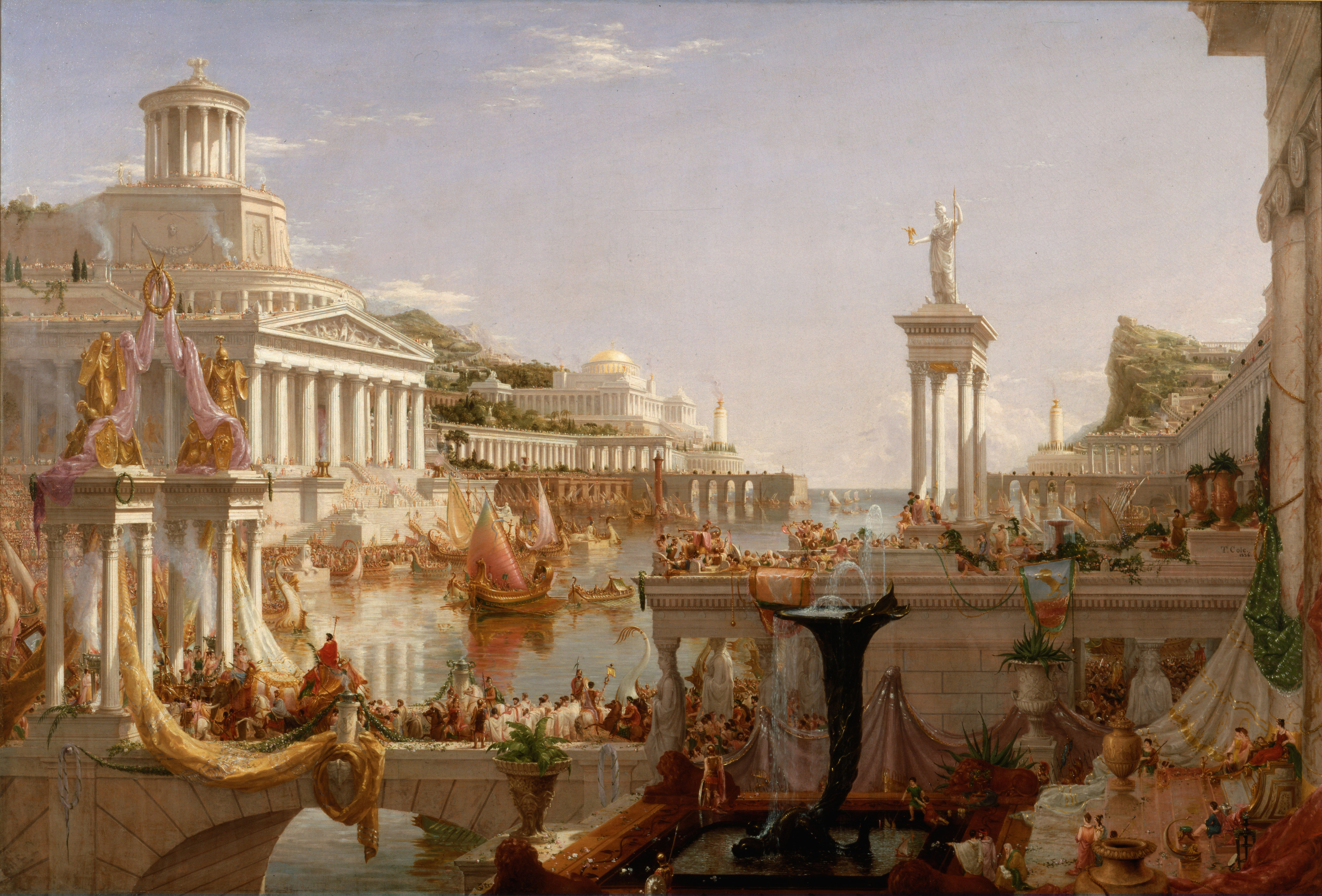
The Course of Empire: Consummation (1835–1836), New-York Historical Society

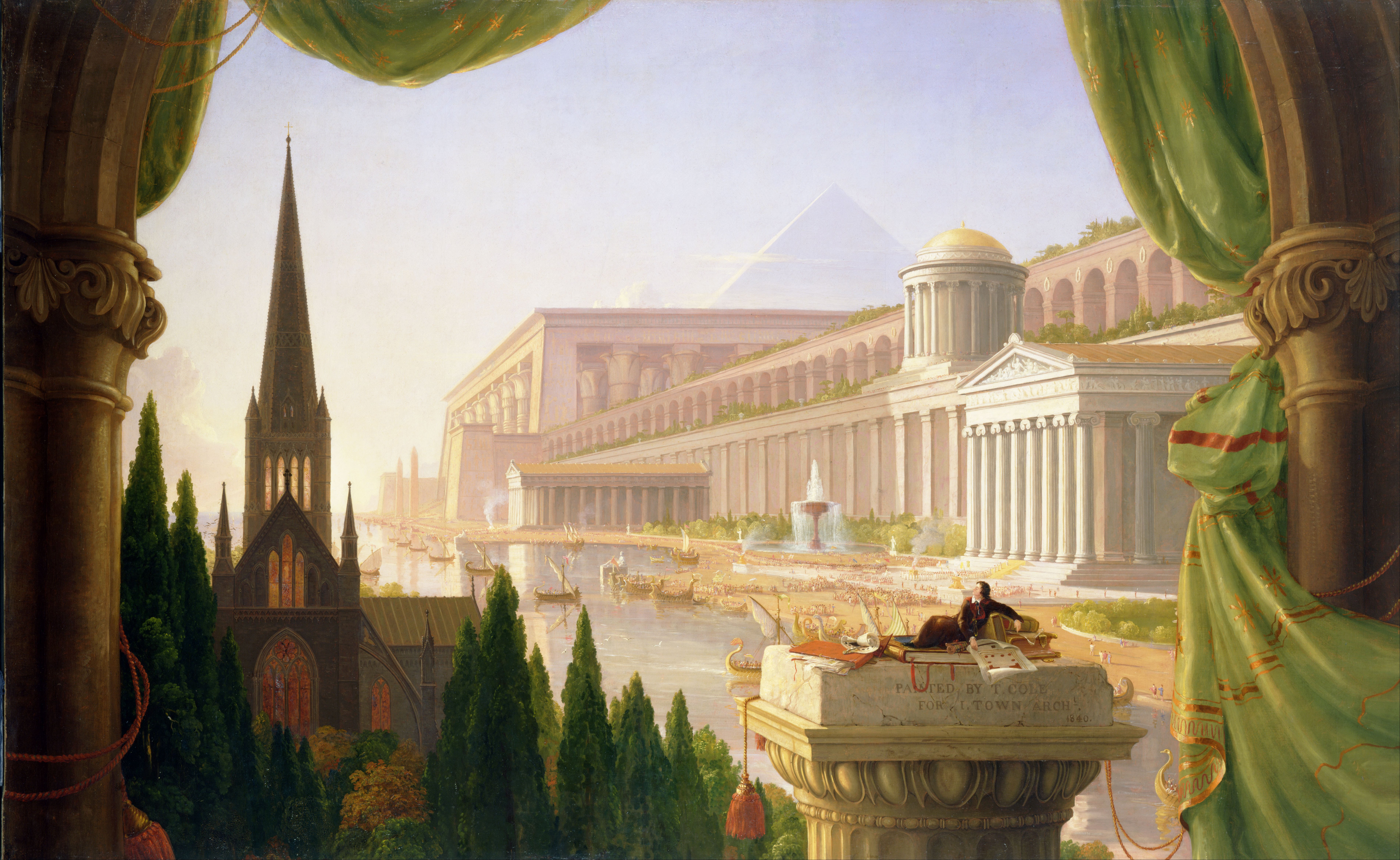
The Architect's Dream (1840), Toledo Museum of Art

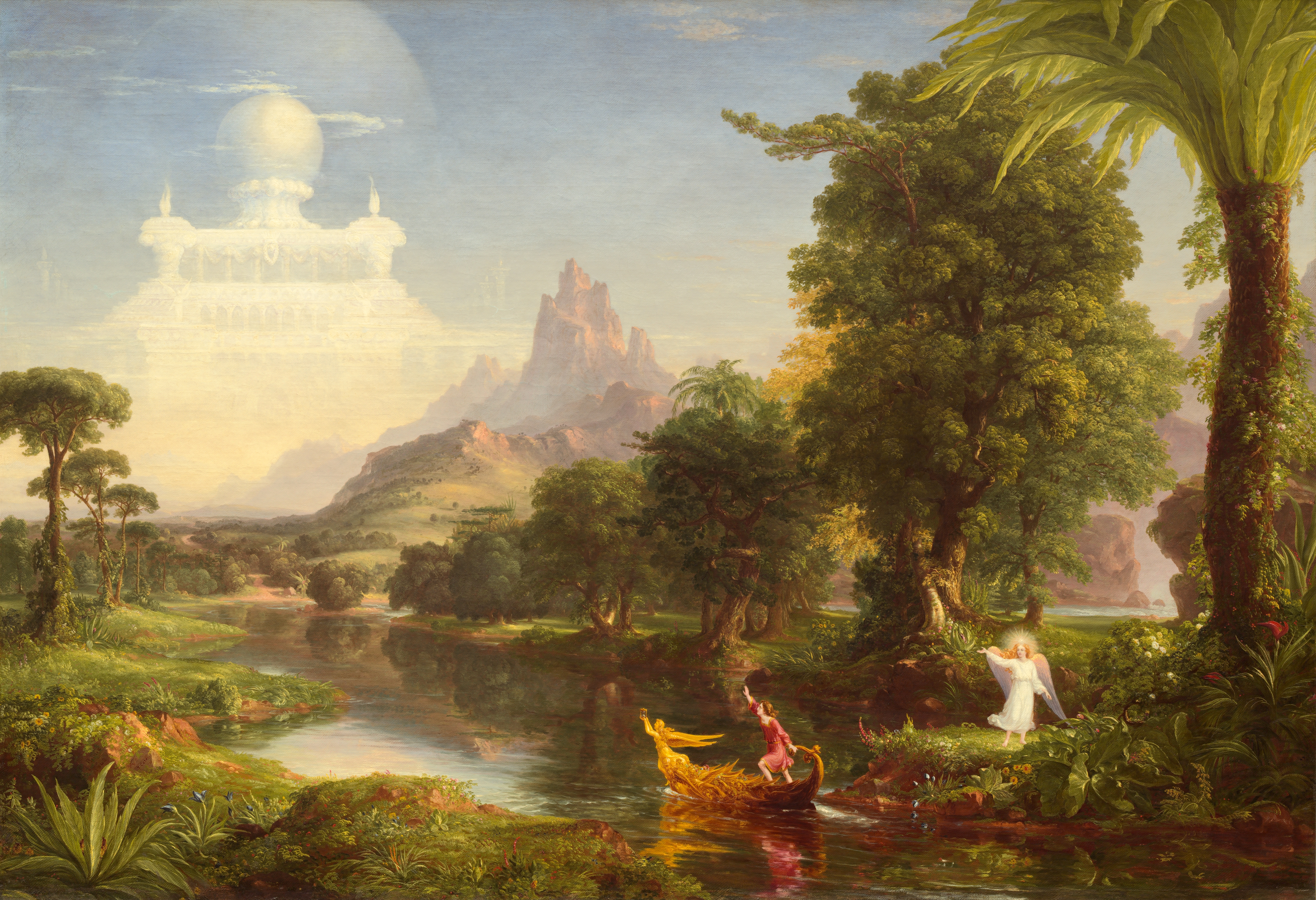
The Voyage of Life: Youth (1842), National Gallery of Art

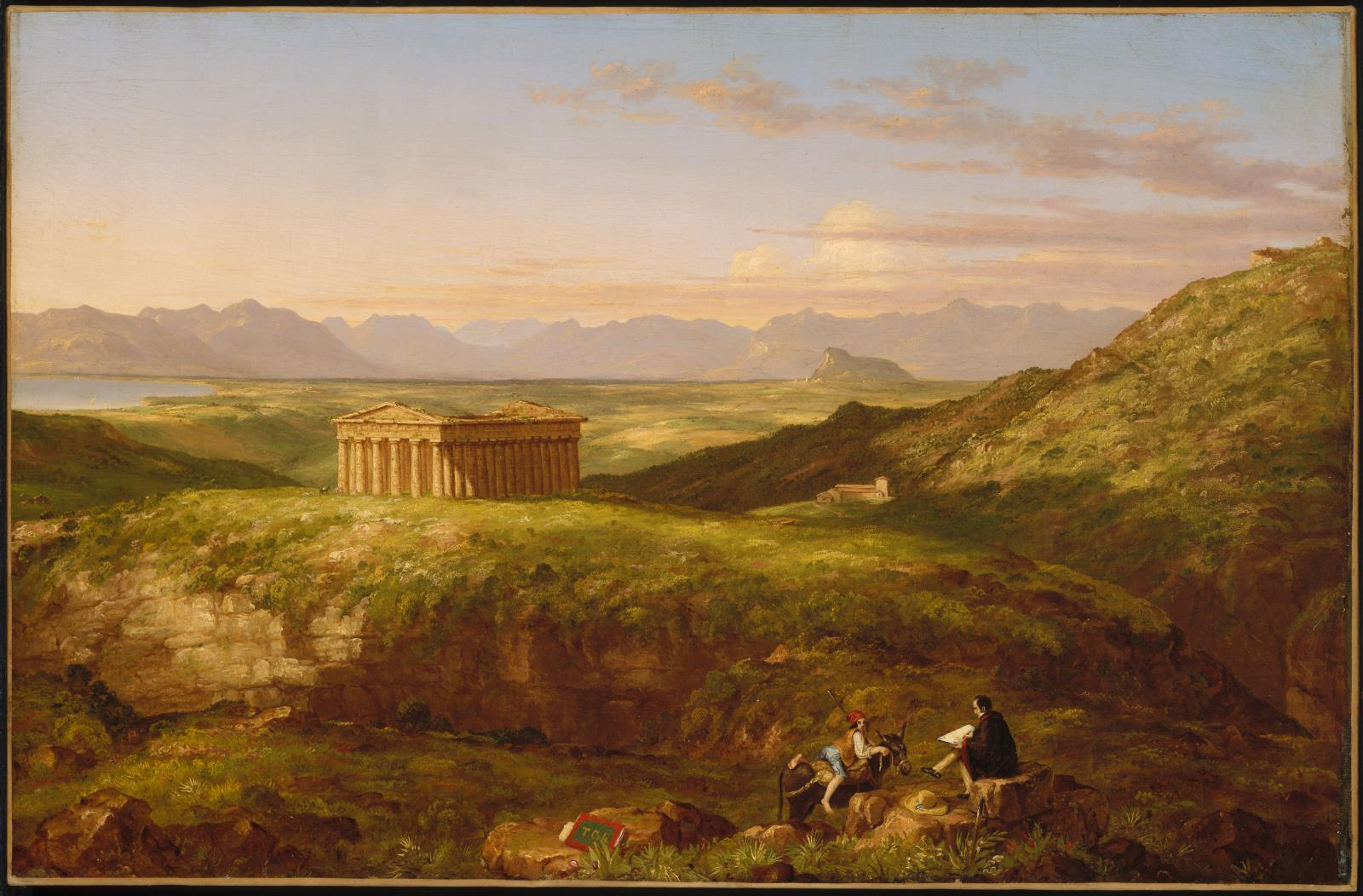
Temple of Segesta (1843), Museum of Fine Arts, Boston

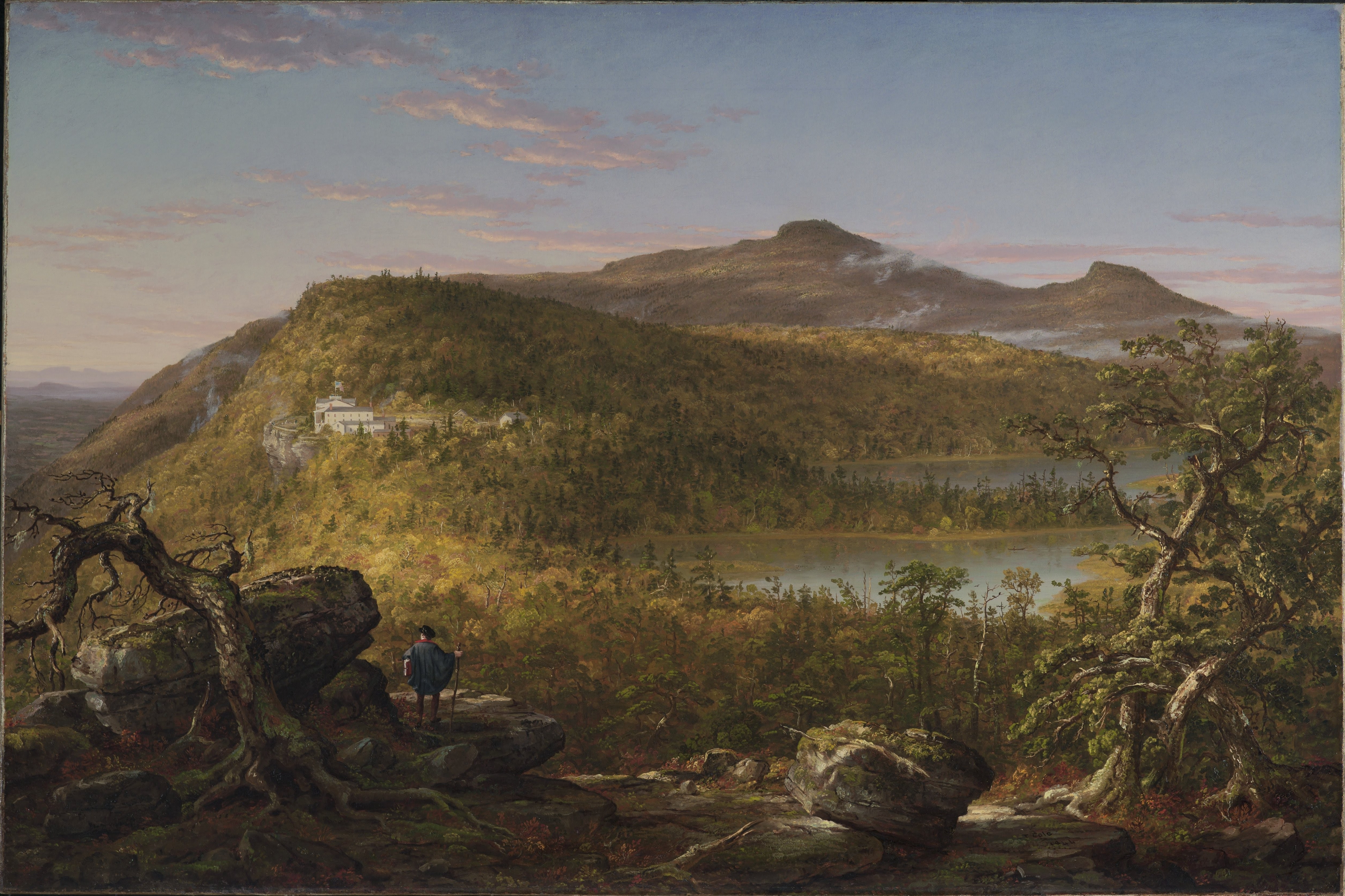
A View of the Two Lakes and Mountain House, Catskill Mountains, Morning (c. 1844), Brooklyn Museum

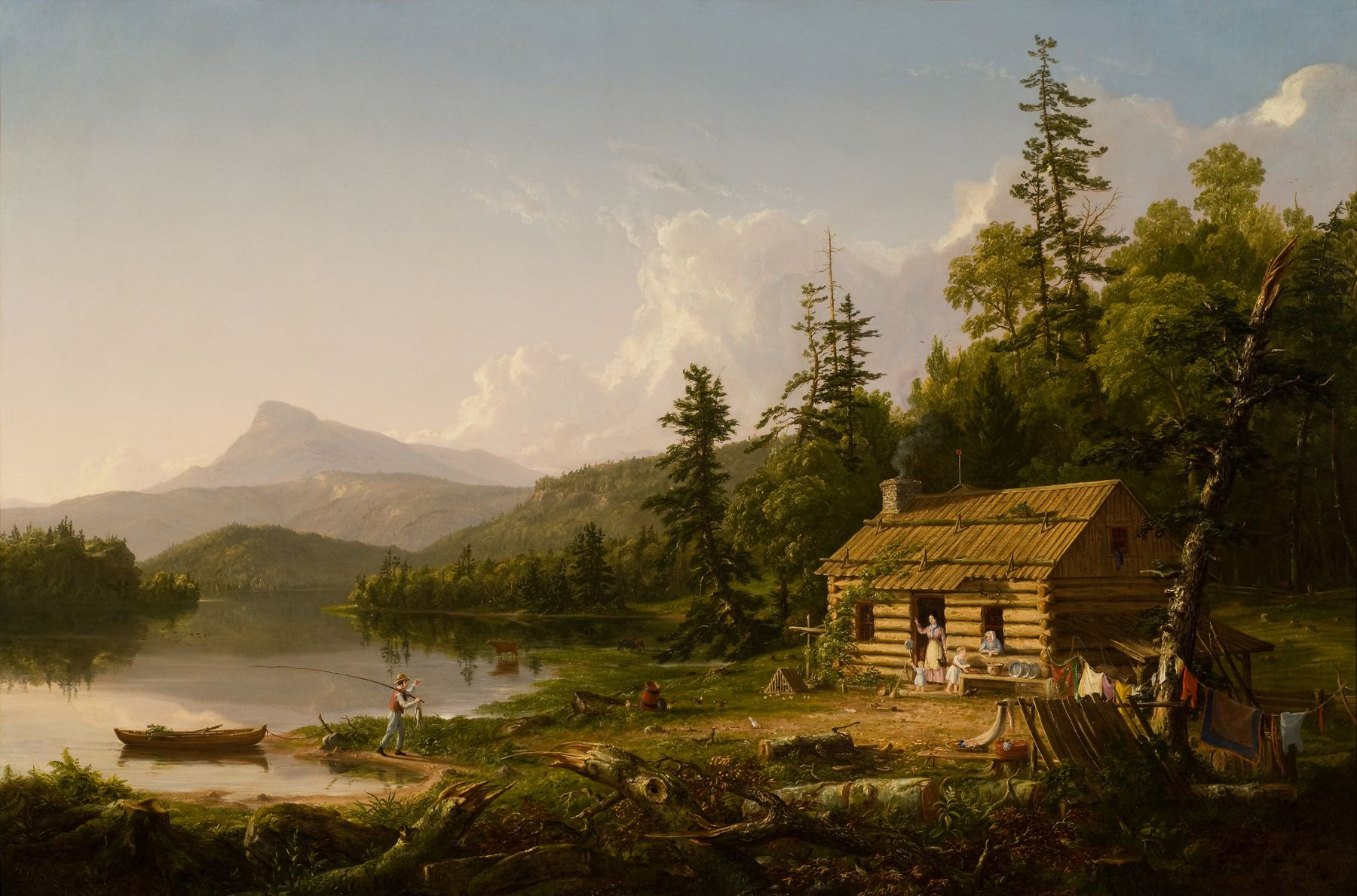
Home in the Woods (1847), Reynolda House Museum of American Art

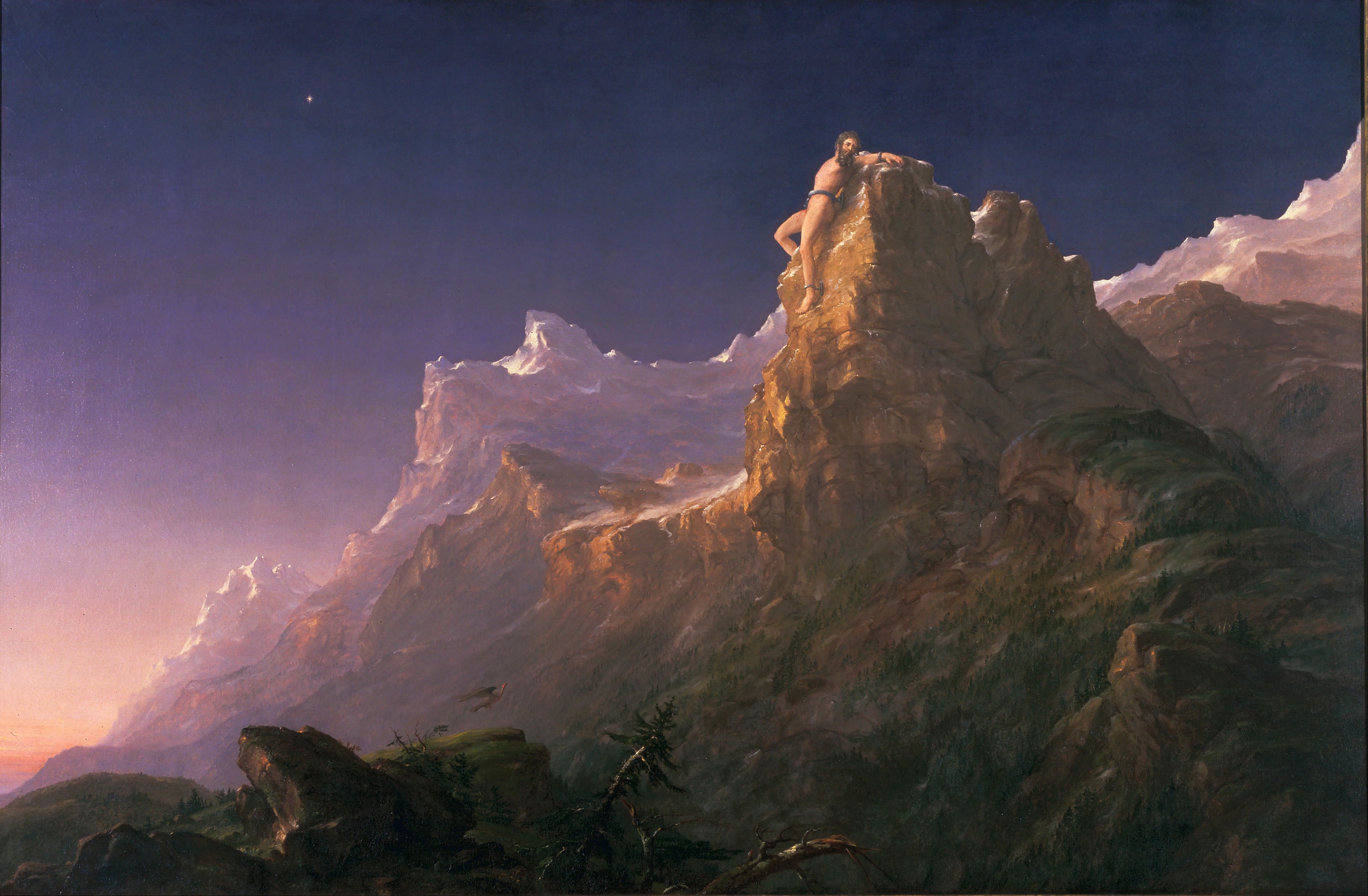
Prometheus Bound (1847), Fine Arts Museums of San Francisco

== See also ==
- List of paintings by Thomas Cole
- New Hampshire historical marker no. 38: White Mountain School of Art
