= Jill Cook =

British Museum curator

Jill Cook FSA
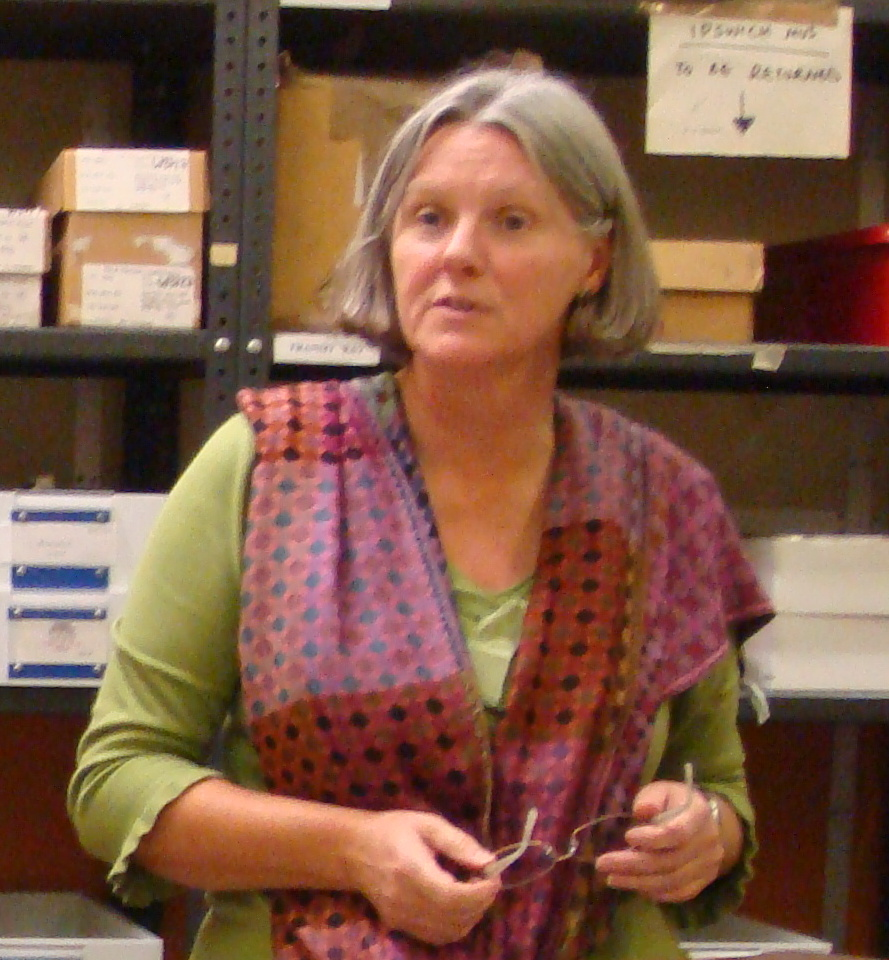
- Cook in 2011
- Born: 1954 (age 71–72)
- Occupation: Museum curator

Academic work
- Discipline: Palaeontology, Archaeology
- Institutions: British Museum
- Notable works: Ice Age Art, The Swimming Reindeer

Jill Cook, FSA (born 1954) is a British museum curator who is the acting Keeper of the Department of Britain, Europe and Prehistory at the British Museum. She curates the collection of European Prehistory and is a specialist in Ice Age art and the archaeology of human evolution.

== Career ==
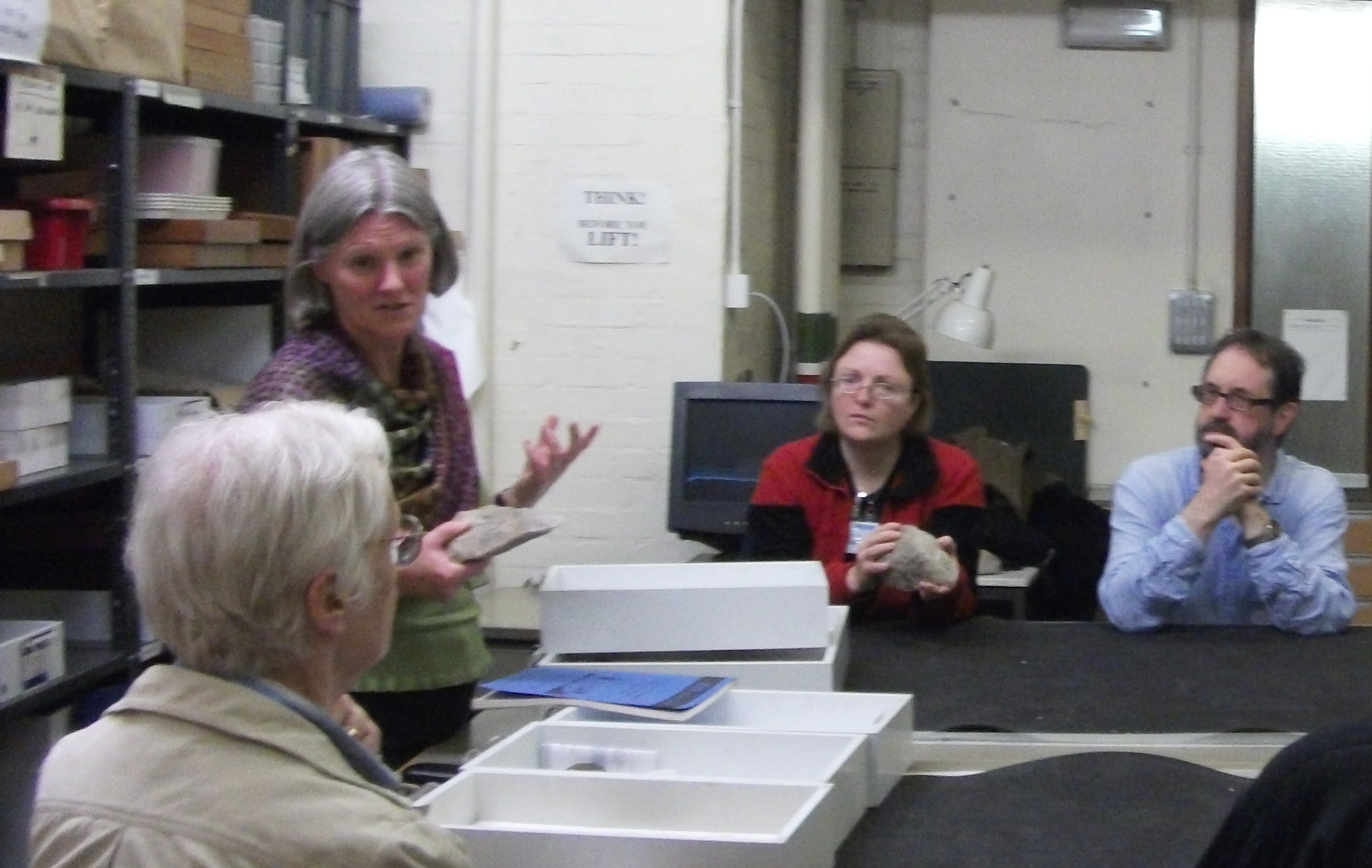
Jill Cook giving a talk on stone tools to a group of Wikipedians in 2011

Cook joined the British Museum in 1986 as the curator of European Prehistory, becoming Deputy Keeper and is presently the Acting Keeper (head of department) of Britain, Europe and Prehistory. Cook was elected a member of the Society of Antiquaries of London in 1990.

=== Ice Age Art ===
Cook curated the exhibition Ice Age art: arrival of the modern mind at the British Museum in 2013. The exhibition was a surprise success for the British Museum, which extended its run, despite the fact that it had struggled to attract sponsorship. Ice Age art attracted large visitor numbers and good reviews. Cook used art by Picasso, Degas, Mondrian, and Matisse, as well as work by modern artists such as Ghislaine Howard in combination with Ice Age artefacts to examine the development of western art.

Ice Age art was transformed into a new exhibition called Art in the age of Altamira at the Fundación Botín, Santander in late 2013.

=== The Lampedusa Cross ===
The Lampedusa Cross was acquired by Cook for the British Museum in 2015. It was made and donated by Francesco Tuccio, a carpenter who created crosses from the wreck of a boat which sank on 11 October 2013 off the coast of Lampedusa resulting in the deaths of 311 people. In 2021 the cross was temporarily loaned to Hastings Museum and Art Gallery.

=== Living with Gods ===
Cook curated the exhibition Living with gods: peoples, places and worlds beyond at the British Museum in 2017–2018. The exhibition was part of a series of related projects produced by the British Museum and the BBC, including the BBC Radio 4 series Living with the Gods.

== Select bibliography ==
- Ice Age art: arrival of the modern mind (British Museum Press, 2013)
- with P Woodman, 'Elephant's Teeth in the Diocese of Kilmore' Archaeology Ireland Vol. 27, No. 4 (Winter 2013), pp. 11–14
- The Swimming Reindeer (Objects in Focus) (British Museum Press, 2010)
- with S Milliken, A Very Remote Period Indeed. Papers on Palaeolithic Archaeology Presented to Derek Roe (Oxbow books 2001)
- 'Preliminary Report on Marked Human Bones from the 1986-1987 Excavations at Gough's Cave, Somerset, England' Anthropologie (1962-) Vol. 29, No. 3 (1991), pp. 181–187
- 'High Lodge: Einer der ältesten Fundplätze Englands?' Archäologie in Deutschland No. 3 (Juli-Sept. 1988), pp. 36–38
- with P Andrews, 'Natural Modifications to Bones in a Temperate Setting' Man New Series, Vol. 20, No. 4 (Dec., 1985), pp. 675–691
- 'A Re-Examination of Methods of Study Applicable to the British Lower Palaeolithic' World Archaeology Vol. 12, No. 2, Early Man: Some Precise Moments in the Remote Past (Oct., 1980), pp. 218–225
