= Emily Cole =

American artist

Emily Cole (1843-1913) was an artist who specialized in renderings of flowers and other plants in watercolor on paper and mineral paint on china. She was known as the "Catskill China Painter," and held exhibitions in her studio in Catskill, New York. She also participated in exhibitions in New York City. Recent exhibits including her work occurred in 2010, 2019, and 2025. She was a charter member of the New York Society of Ceramic Arts, founded in 1892. Her career as an artist spanned over fifty years. Emily Cole was the third daughter of the noted Hudson River School artist Thomas Cole, who died when she was almost five years old.

== Early life and training ==
Emily Cole was born August 27, 1843 to the landscape painter Thomas Cole and his wife, Maria Bartow Cole. She was the third of four children, and the only one who became a professional artist. She lived her entire life at the family's Cedar Grove homestead in Catskill, New York, which was originally owned by her mother's uncle and then willed to mother's sister upon the uncle's death.

She was mentored as an artist by her aunt on her father's side, Sarah Cole, who painted Hudson River landscapes, and by Frederick Edwin Church, who lived across the Hudson River at Olana. In the 1870s, Cole studied at the National Academy of Design in New York City, which was co-founded by her father. She also honed her abilities through her involvement in china painting.

== Work and style ==
Cole specialized in botanical painting, using the flowers and other plants found locally, often on the grounds of Cedar Grove. She specialized in painting the life cycles of flowers, from buds to wilting, using watercolor on paper and mineral paint on porcelain. "American flower painting emerged as a distinct genre in the mid-nineteenth century as scientists and artists were influenced by European still life painting traditions and scientific discoveries." Botany was originally seen as a pursuit for men, but in the 19th century, it became more acceptable for women to engage in its study, and scientific study more generally. Porcelain painting was also the domain of men prior to the 19th century. However, enhanced learning opportunities and increased leisure time opened the way for women to participate in both. Porcelain painting instruction became increasingly available both in cities and it rural areas, through classes and instructional books and magazines. Emily Cole was a founding member of the New York Society of Ceramic Arts in 1892. In the last decade of the 1800s, it is estimated that there were 25,000 women in the United States working as china painters.

Cole used high quality, unpainted white porcelain that she sourced from Limoges, France. She painted her designs onto the china, and would fire it in the kiln when she was happy with her drawing. After the initial firing, she would add gold luster paint to cup handles and plate edges, then fire the china for the final time. A review of the Philadelphia Exposition of china in 1899 praised Cole's submission: "Miss Emily Cole of Catskill, N.Y. , has a pretty pitcher, extremely well decorated with thistles, in Royal Worcester style."

She worked in the New Studio at Cedar Grove from the 1890s, painting and firing her ceramics, and holding exhibitions of her work. The New Studio had been built by her father, and he used it from December 1846, when it was finished, until his death in February of 1848. The New Studio contained Emily Cole's kiln, which she used not only for her own work, but offered a firing service to other ceramic artists. Between her exhibitions at Cedar Grove and her participation in group exhibits in New York City, Cole found collectors and patrons interested in her work, both within New York State and beyond. A Mr. Taylor of Brooklyn, New York ordered over 100 pieces of her painted china as a gift to managers of an 1883 fair being given to benefit the Home for Destitute Children in that borough. She herself donated her pieces to benefits, and worked on smaller orders for individual patrons.

Her obituary in the Columbia Republican noting her death on September 18,1913 stated that her work was to be found in many notable collections of china painting in New York City and elsewhere.

== Exhibitions/museum collections ==
- Remember the Ladies: Women of the Hudson River School, Thomas Cole National Historic Site, 2010
- The Art of Emily Cole, Thomas Cole National Historic Site, March 2 - August 11, 2019
- Emily Cole: Ceramics, Flora & Contemporary Responses, Thomas Cole National Historic Site, May 3 - November 2, 2025

Cedar Grove, Emily Cole's home throughout her life, is now the Thomas Cole National Historic Site. It owns over 100 works, both on paper and on china, by Emily Cole.
