= Living with the Gods =

BBC Radio 4 series

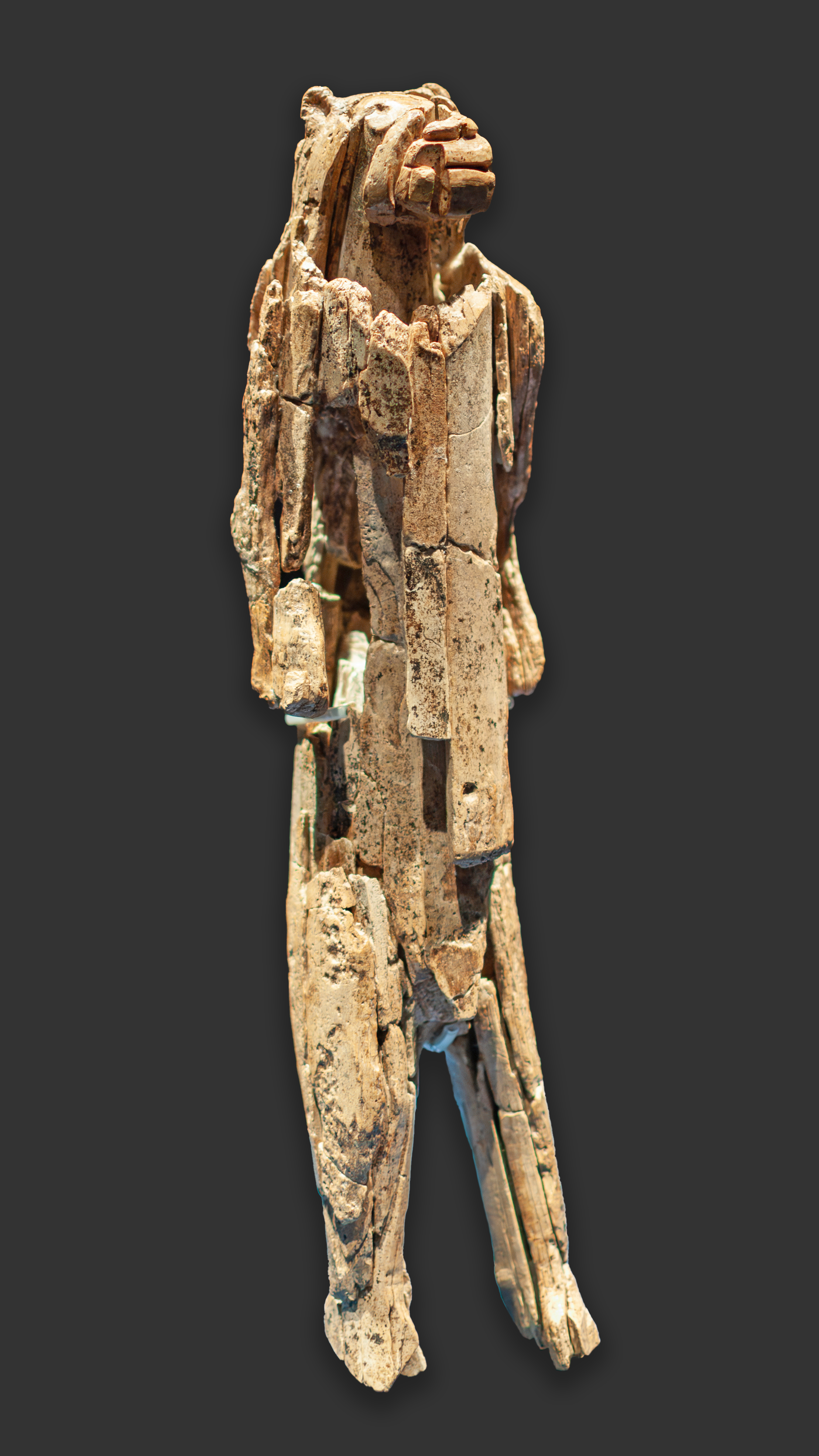
The "Lion-Man" artefact

Living with the Gods is a 30-part BBC Radio 4 series presented by Neil MacGregor, a former director of the British Museum. It explores human societies and what MacGregor describes as "the connections between structures of belief, and the structures of society". The series examines artefacts from the 40,000 year-old Lion-man sculpture to the contemporary Lampedusa Cross created by Francisco Tuccio in response to the 2013 drowning of refugees off the island of Lampedusa.

In the episode Living with Many Gods, MacGregor explained:

"Choosing a title for this series turned out to be extremely difficult, because although some societies have many gods there are others that acknowledge only one, and for whom even the idea of 'gods' in the plural is offensive. And then there are some communities that share the world around them with spirits, or shifting supernatural beings, which wouldn't match our understanding of a god. And a few societies like Soviet Russia have tried to live officially with no god at all. In every case the consequences for society are profound."

The series accompanied an exhibition at the British Museum, running until 8 April 2018.

== Reception ==
Writing in the New Statesman, Antonia Quirke asked, "What makes Neil MacGregor the best presenter on BBC radio? His new 30-part series Living With the Gods, about objects connected to belief, ceremony and ritual, begins on 23 October (BBC Radio 4, 9.45am), and listening to the first few episodes it’s clear that it is every bit the equal of Kenneth Clark's Civilisation or Jacob Bronowski's The Ascent of Man. None of them could hope to find a place on television now".
