= Ghislaine Howard =

English artist

Ghislaine Howard is a figurative artist who works with paint to describe the human figure and the universal experiences of the human condition.

== Early life and education ==
Ghislaine Howard was born in Eccles, Lancashire in 1953. Her father was an actor, Martin Dobson, and her mother, Maureen, a nurse.

Early promise as an artist lead to her taking art classes with Harold Riley. Her art studies included a foundation course at Manchester Polytechnic and a degree in Fine Art at the University of Newcastle, where she shared a flat with Debbie Horsfield

== Exhibitions ==
She first came to the attention of the wider art world in 1993 with "A Shared Experience" at Manchester City Art Gallery, an exhibition which looked at pregnancy and childbirth and garnered critical praise.

Liverpool's Capital of Culture status in 2008 led the artist to produce a major new work "The Empty Tomb" which was unveiled by the Bishop of Liverpool on Easter Sunday 2008.

This was followed by the equally acclaimed "Ghislaine Howard 365" at the Imperial War Museum North, an exhibition which group together 365 small canvases, one for each day of the year, in which she depicted a news event of the day.

She has shown her large cycle of paintings The Stations of The Cross / The Captive Figure at the two Liverpool Cathedrals at Canterbury Cathedral as part of an ongoing tour of cathedral cities in UK. Her 25 foot high Visitation Altarpiece can be seen in Trinity Chapel at Liverpool Hope University.

In 2013, her drawing Pregnant Self Portrait was at the centre of the British Museum's exhibition, an examination of the development of western art. British Museum curator Jill Cook said the drawing had proved of the most thought-provoking in an exhibition that included Henry Moore, Matisse and Picasso.

She has featured in numerous publications and television documentaries including Mischa Scorer's "Degas: An Old Man Mad about Art", 1996 and "Degas and the Dance" in 2004, which was awarded the prestigious international Peabody Award.

On 11 May 2020, Ghislaine Howard opened her collection at Elliot House, 151 Deansgate, Manchester, M3 3WD. Home to Greater Manchester Chamber of Commerce Ghislaine quoted "It's a real honour to be showing my work in this iconic Manchester building, with its connection with the inspirational suffragist and educationalist, Lydia Becker, and to know that my paintings will be seen by so many people from all kinds of different backgrounds and experiences."

== Public collections ==
Howard's work is in The Ghislaine Howard Collection at Elliott House; The Royal Collection; Manchester Art Gallery; Whitworth Art Gallery; Graves Art Gallery, Sheffield; Salford Museum and Art Gallery; the BBC; Saint Mary's Maternity Unit Manchester; the Manchester Metropolitan University; Her Majesty's Prison Service; British Medical Association; the Methodist Modern Art Collection; and Liverpool Hope University College and shown on Art UK.

== Bibliography ==
- A Shared Experience, Manchester City Art Gallery and Wellcome Foundation, essay by David Peters‑Corbett, 1993/4
- A Shared Experience: Paintings and Drawings by Ghislaine Howard, Manchester City Art Galleries, Manchester, (1993)
- Artist's Diary, Art Review, March 1994
- Portraiture and Drawing the Figure, Ray Smith, published by Dorling Kindersley, in association with the Royal Academy, 1994
- Steeple Chase Park, poetry by Frances Neagle, 1996
- Exhibiting Gender, Sarah Hyde, Whitworth Art Gallery, Manchester University Press, September 1997 ISBN 978-0719042430
- The Human Touch: Ghislaine Howard: Paintings, Drawings and Prints(1980-2016), Manchester Metropolitan University in association with Martin Heaps (16 Mar. 2017) ISBN 1910029262
- The Northern School: A Reappraisal, Martin Regan, ISBN 978-1-5272-0320-4
