= Sarah Cole (painter) =

American landscape painter (1805–1857)

- Born: January 1, 1805; Bolton, Lancashire, England
- Died: January 1, 1857 (aged 52); Catskill, New York, U.S.
- Known for: Painting
- Notable work: Mt. Aetna, A View of the Catskill Mountain House, Ancient Column Near Syracuse
- Movement: Hudson River School

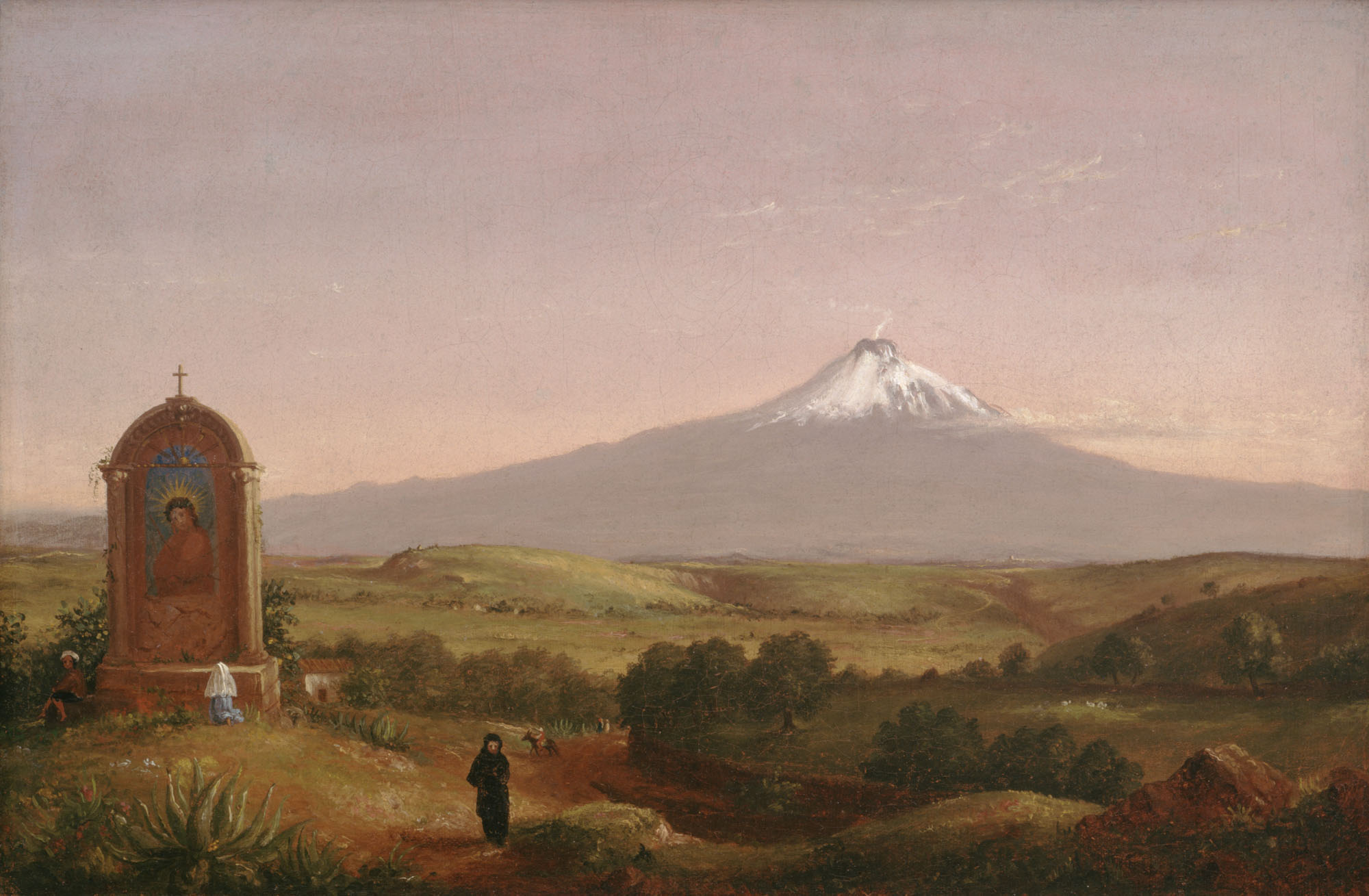
Mt. Aetna by Sarah Cole

Sarah Cole (1805–1857) was an American landscape painter and the sister of American landscape painter Thomas Cole. Although she was among the small group of early American female landscape painters, little is known about her life and few of her paintings are known to have survived.

== Early life ==
Cole was born in Lancashire, England. Her parents, James and Mary Cole, had six other children aside from her and Thomas, all daughters. Thomas was the seventh of the eight children, and Sarah was the youngest. In 1818, her parents immigrated to the United States with four of their children, the sisters Ann, Mary, and Sarah, their brother Thomas, and an aunt. The family arrived in Philadelphia in July, and moved to Steubenville, Ohio, in September of the same year, with Thomas following on a year later. In Steubenville, Ann and Mary opened a seminary, where Sarah may have also eventually taught.

In 1824, the family moved to Pittsburgh. The next year, they moved to New York City, where Sarah likely lived for the rest of her life. She often visited Catskill, where she and Thomas would hike in the Catskill Mountains, and occasionally visited family and friends in Baltimore.

== Career and paintings ==
It is not known when Sarah Cole began to make art, though she first mentions that she is painting in letters to her brother in the mid-1830s. She exhibited her paintings publicly only after the death of Thomas in February 1848, most likely to help support herself financially. The National Academy of Design in New York City displayed her work from 1848 to 1852, and her works also appeared in the American Art-Union and the Maryland Historical Society during her lifetime. Titles of these canvases indicate original, rather than copied, subjects. The majority of her exhibited paintings are now believed to be lost.

Two of Cole's paintings can be found today are on display in the Albany Institute of History and Art in Albany, New York. The paintings are A View of the Catskill Mountain House, a scene of the titular white house on a hill covered with fall foliage and a small seated figure on the ground looking up at it, and Mount Aetna, a view of the mountain in the background with a landscape and people praying to a shrine of an icon. A note on the back of the canvas of the Catskill Mountain House painting indicates that it was copied from a painting by her brother Thomas.

Another painting by Sarah Cole, Ancient Column Near Syracuse (1848), depicts a landscape with a Neoclassical theme. It pictures a person with some animals on a green field in front of ancient ruins. The Thomas Cole National Historic Site in the Catskills also houses her paintings Duffield Church, English Landscape, and Landscape with Church.

In addition to being a painter, Cole made etchings. She was trained in etching by the painter and engraver Asher B. Durand. Cole mentored her fraternal niece Emily Cole, after the death of the latter's father. Emily also worked as an artist In 1888, decades after her death, New York's Union League Club held an exhibition called “Women Etchers of America” that included some of her work. All of the other exhibitors in that show were living artists. None of her etchings are known to have survived.

Cole died in 1857, spending her final days in Catskill, New York.
