= Children Eating a Tart =

Painting by Bartolomé Esteban Murillo

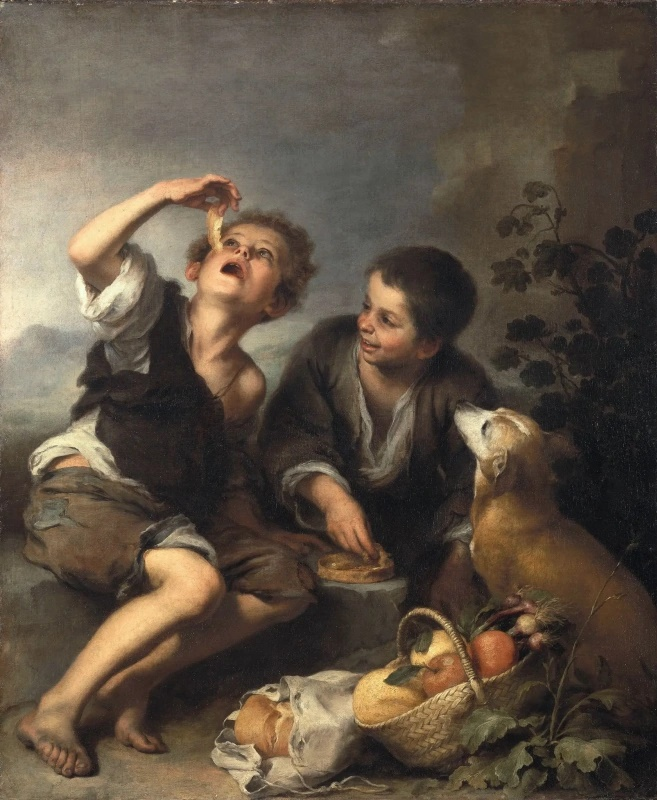
Children Eating a Tart (c. 1670–1675) by Bartolomé Esteban Murillo

Children Eating a Tart is a c. 1670-1675 oil on canvas painting by Bartolomé Esteban Murillo, measuring 123 by 102 cm and now in the Alte Pinakothek in Munich.

Murillo and some of his near-contemporaries like Bernhard Keil (a Dane mainly active in Italy who painted some works centred on children) were the first European painters to produce works centred on children. The work belongs to a group of genre paintings of children produced by Murillo between 1670 and 1675, based - like his earlier works on that theme like Children Eating Grapes and a Melon - on street children in Seville.
