= The Little Fruitseller =

Painting by Bartolomé Esteban Murillo

The Little Fruitseller (c. 1670-1675) by Bartolomé Esteban Murillo

The Little Fruitseller is a c.1670-1675 oil on canvas painting by Bartolomé Esteban Murillo, held in the Alte Pinakothek in Munich, to which it was bequeathed in 1768 by Franz Joseph von Dufresne, a Hofkammerrate.
