= Boy with a Dog =

Painting by Bartolomé Esteban Murillo

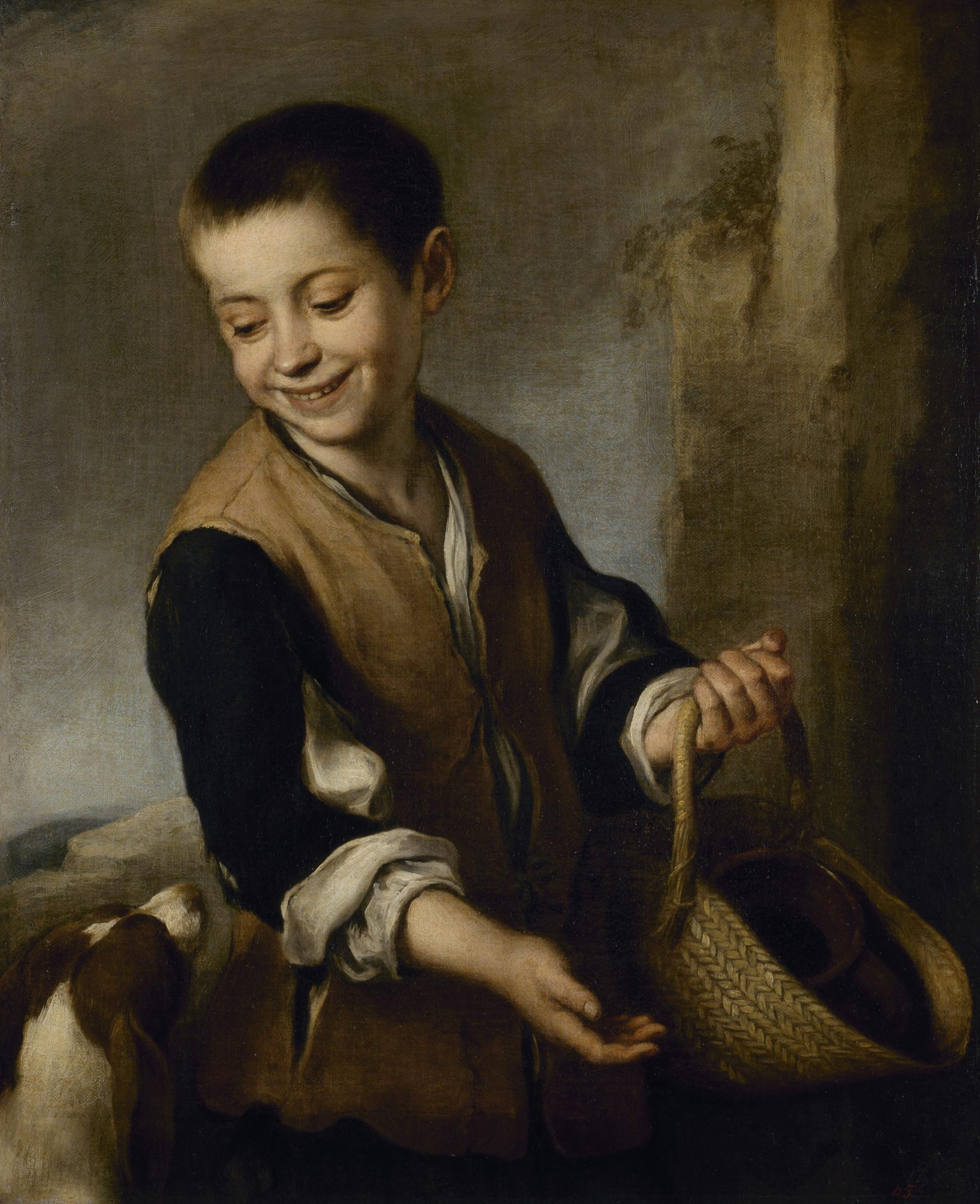
- Artist: Bartolomé Esteban Murillo
- Year: c. 1655-1660
- Medium: Oil on canvas
- Dimensions: 70 cm × 60 cm (28 in × 24 in)
- Location: Hermitage Museum; Saint Petersburg

Boy with a Dog is an oil on canvas painting executed ca. 1655–1660 by Bartolomé Esteban Murillo, now in the Hermitage Museum, in Saint Petersburg, for which it was acquired from the Comte de Choiseul collection in 1772.

The painting represents a ragged, mischievous and cheerful boy, playing with a dog. It is one of Murillo's paintings of children that displays signs of the hardship that in the mid-seventeenth century affected a Seville depleted by the taxes and the competition of Cádiz, after the plague of 1649.
