= Joseph and Potiphar's Wife (Murillo) =

Painting by Bartolomé Esteban Murillo

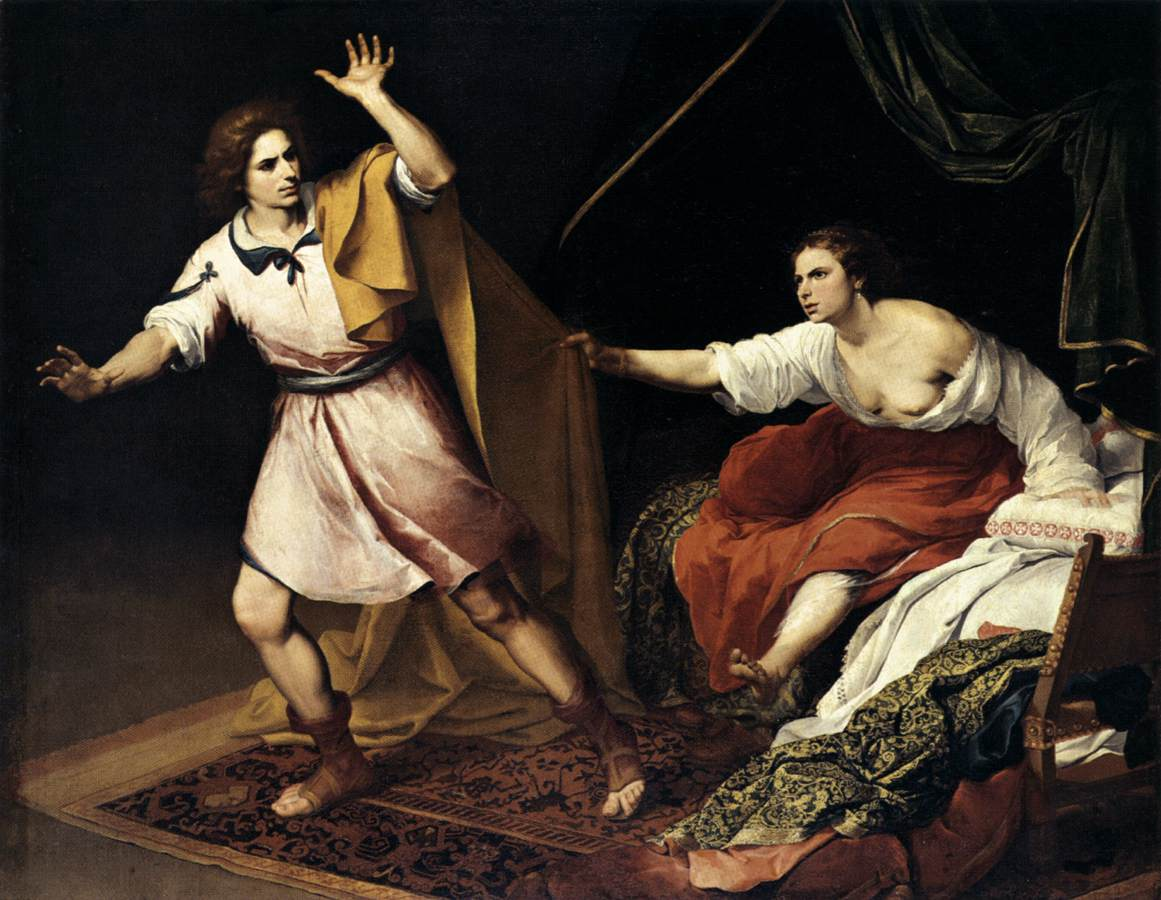
- Artist: Bartolomé Esteban Murillo
- Year: 1640–1645
- Type: Oil on canvas
- Dimensions: 197 cm × 254 cm (78 in × 100 in)
- Location: Gemäldegalerie Alte Meister, Kassel

Joseph and Potiphar's Wife is a 1640–1645 oil on canvas painting by the Spanish artist Murillo, now in the Gemäldegalerie Alte Meister (Kassel). His later 1660s version of the subject is now in a private collection.

== History and description ==
The theme relates to the story told in Book of Genesis chapter 39, of Joseph in Potiphar's house, when the wife of his master tried to seduced him, but he refused.

It depicts Joseph fleeing with his arms raised as Potiphar's wife attempts to pull him onto the bed where she sits, with her left breast exposed. To do so, she clutches a fold of the cloak belonging to the man she is vainly trying to make her lover with her right hand, causing the yellow garment to slip from his shoulder — the very garment she will soon use to accuse him of attempted rape out of spite.

Acquired before 1775 by Frederick II of Hesse-Kassel, the work is housed at the Gemäldegalerie Alte Meister, in Kassel.

== Sources ==
- "Joseph und die Frau des Potiphar - Onlinedatenbank der Gemäldegalerie Alte Meister Kassel". altemeister.museum-kassel.de.
