= Children Eating Grapes and a Melon =

Painting by Bartolomé Esteban Murillo

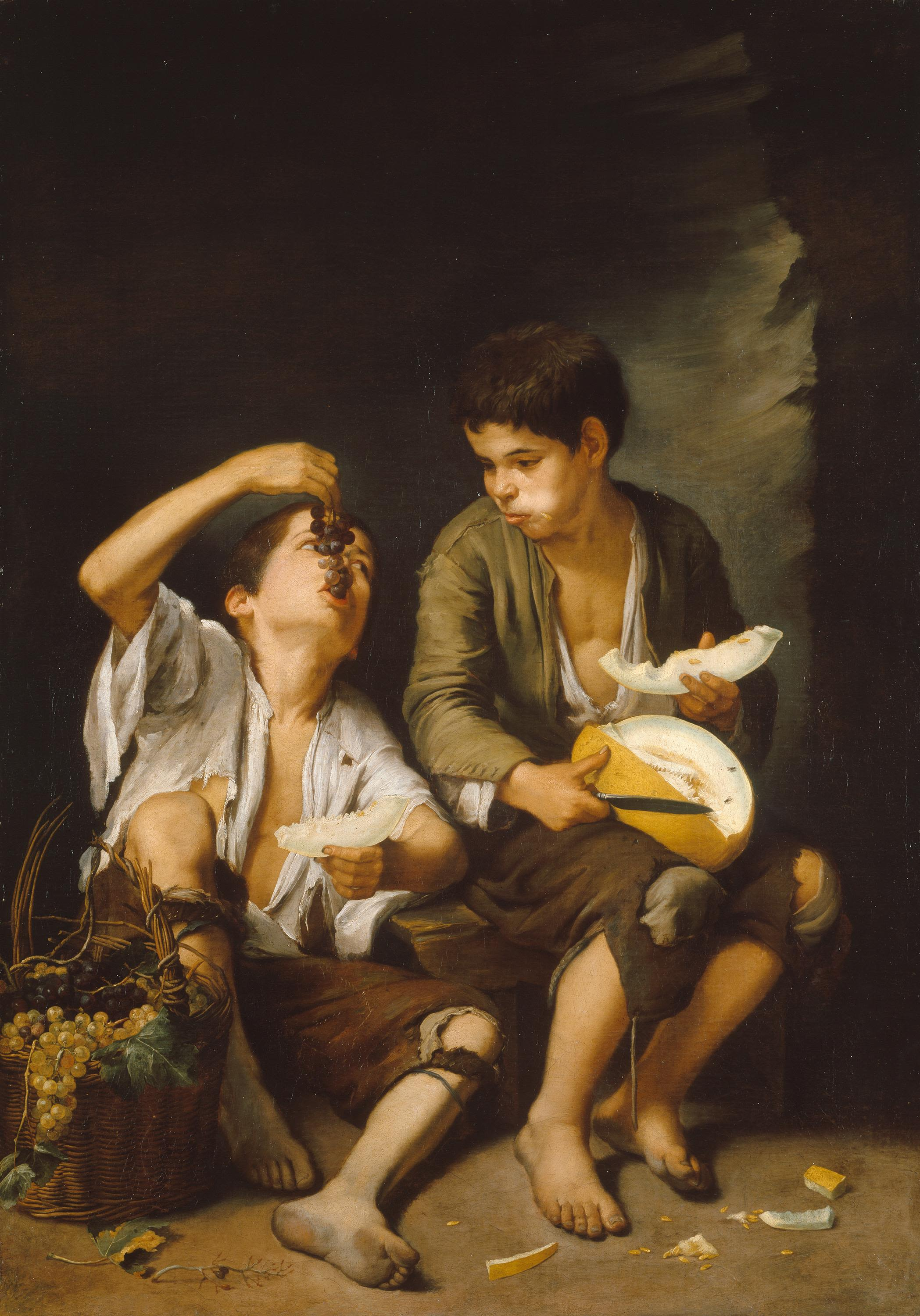
Children Eating Grapes and a Melon (1645-1650) by Bartolomé Esteban Murillo

Children Eating Grapes and a Melon is a 1645-1650 oil on canvas painting by Bartolomé Esteban Murillo, now in room XIII of the Alte Pinakothek in Munich. Along with religious works, realistic and naturalistic genre scenes like this form one of the most oft-repeated themes in the artist's oeuvre, often centred on children, as also seen in Children Playing Dice and The Young Beggar.

Almost all of these genre works by Murillo are now in collections outside Spain, perhaps indicating that they were commissioned for some of the many Flemish merchants based in Seville and destined for north European art dealers such as Nicolás de Omazur, an important collector and client of Murillo. This work and Children Playing Dice were both acquired by Maximilian II Emanuel, governor of the Spanish Netherlands in the late 17th and early 18th centuries, and they became the first two works by the artist to enter the Alte Pinakothek, which now also houses the artist's Sleeping Christ Child with Angels, The Young Fruitsellers, St Thomas of Villaneuva Healing a Lame Man, Laughing Shepherd Boy and Nit-Picking.

The painter shows beggars and poverty in Seville, one of the most important and commercial cities in Spain and Portugal, drawing a large number of homeless people, compounded by the ravages of plague and the deep economic and social crisis brought about by the absolute monarchy of the House of Austria. Its profane and everyday interpretation shows Murillo's knowledge of the Italian school and especially Caravaggio's Bacchus.
