= Bartolomé Esteban Murillo =

Spanish Baroque painter (1617–1682)

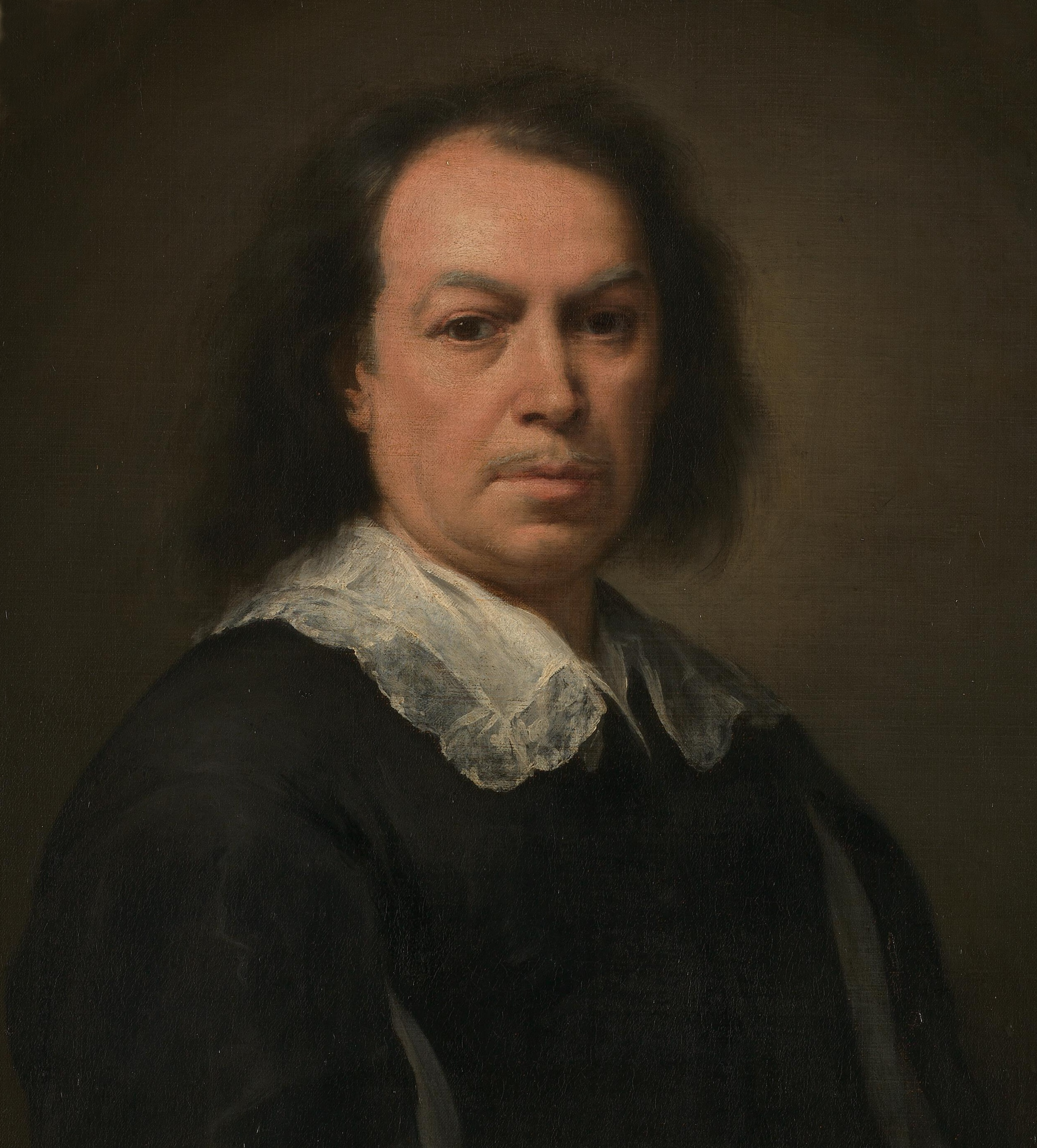
- Self-portrait, c. 1670–1673 (detail), National Gallery, London
- Born: Late December 1617; baptised 1 January 1618; Seville, Crown of Castile
- Died: 3 April 1682 (aged 64); Seville, Crown of Castile
- Known for: Painting, drawing
- Movement: Spanish Baroque

Signature
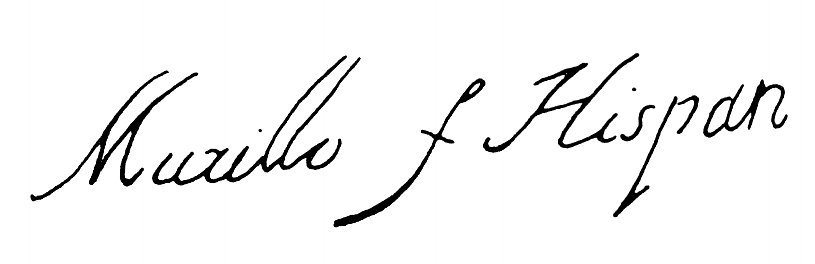

Bartolomé Esteban Murillo (/mjʊəˈrɪloʊ, m(j)ʊˈriːoʊ/ mure-IL-oh, m(y)uu-REE-oh, Spanish: [baɾtoloˈme esˈteβam muˈɾiʎo]; late December 1617, baptised 1 January 1618 – 3 April 1682) was a Spanish Baroque painter. Although he is best known for his religious works, Murillo also produced a considerable number of paintings of contemporary women and children. These lively realistic portraits of flower girls, street urchins, and beggars constitute an extensive record of the everyday life of his times. He also painted two self-portraits, one in the Frick Collection portraying him in his 30s, and one in London's National Gallery portraying him about 20 years later. In 2017–18, the two museums held an exhibition of them.

== Childhood ==
Murillo was probably born in December 1617 to Gaspar Esteban, an accomplished barber surgeon, and María Pérez Murillo. He may have been born in Seville or in Pilas, a smaller Andalusian town. It is clear that he was baptized in Santa Maria Magdalena, a parish in Seville in 1618. After his parents died in 1627 and 1628, he became a ward of his older sister Ana and her husband, Juan Agustín Lagares, who coincidentally also happened to be a barber. Murillo seemed to have remained close to the couple considering he did not leave their house until his marriage in 1645. Eleven years later, he was named the executor of Lagares' will despite his sister having already died. Murillo seldom used his father's surname, and instead took his surname from his maternal grandmother, Elvira Murillo.

== Early life and formative years ==
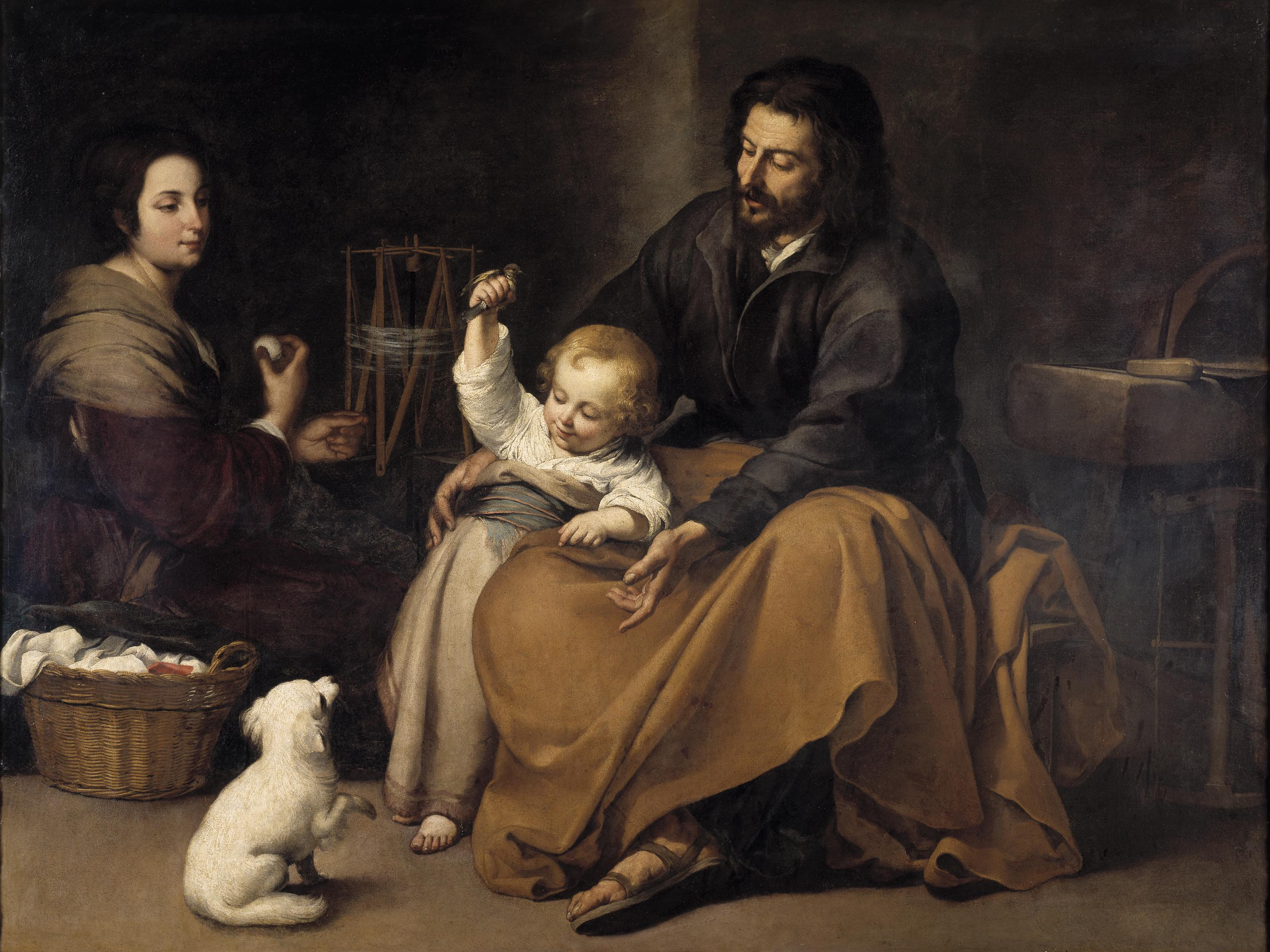
The Holy Family with a Little Bird, c. 1645–1650, Museo del Prado

There are few documents on the early years of Murillo's life or on his origins as a painter. In 1633, at 15, Murillo received a license for passage to America with his family. He probably began his artistic career, either during those years or slightly beforehand. Murillo began his art studies in Seville in the workshop of Juan del Castillo, Murillo's uncle and godfather, as well a skilled painter in his own right. Castillo was characterized by the dryness of his sketches and the loving expressions in the subjects he painted, and Murillo took much of this as inspiration in his early work. His first works were also influenced by Francisco de Zurbarán, Jusepe de Ribera and Alonso Cano, and he shared their strongly realist approach. The great commercial importance of Seville at the time ensured that he was subject to artistic influences from other regions. He became familiar with Flemish painting and the "Treatise on Sacred Images" of Molanus (Ian van der Meulen or Molano). As his painting developed, his more important works evolved towards the polished style that suited the bourgeois and aristocratic tastes of the time, demonstrated especially in his Roman Catholic religious works.

According to fellow painter and art historian Antonio Palomino, Murillo left Castillo's workshop after feeling he had grown sufficiently skilled in his painting. In 1642, at the age of 26, he allegedly traveled to Madrid, where he most likely became familiar with the work of Velázquez, and saw the work of Francisco de Palacios; the rich colors and softly modeled forms of his subsequent work suggest these influences. While it is likely that, like many Sevillian painters, Murillo took inspiration from religious images in an attempt to attract the lucrative American market, there is actually little evidence of Murillo traveling to Madrid. Similar claims, attributed by Joachim von Sandrart, a German historian of the time, argue that Murillo also travelled to Italy during the same period. Palomino denies these assertions, arguing that they stem from a refusal of foreigners to acknowledge that Murillo's success had come from Spain, and Spain alone.

Palomino, instead, argued that Murillo's skill came from hours spent in his room, studying the natural world. He would use these skills when painting for the public, for the Franciscan convents throughout Spain, and for his fellow painters, who until then had little knowledge of his existence or art. In either case, his style could easily have been learned without leaving Seville from its previous generation of artists, such as Francisco de Zurbarán or Francisco de Herrera the Elder.

== Career ==
Two women at a window, c. 1655–1660, National Gallery of Art, Washington, D.C.

In 1645, he returned to Seville and married Beatriz Cabrera y Villalobos, with whom he eventually had ten children. Of these children, only five outlived their mother, and only one, Gabriel (1655–1700) later carried on the work of Bartolome as a painter. The year of his marriage, Murillo received the first major commission of his career. This was to paint eleven canvases for the convent of San Francisco in Seville. He worked on this project from 1645 until 1648. These works depicted various stories of Franciscan saints which were not often told at the time. When selecting subjects, Murillo placed an emphasis on praising lives of contemplation and prayer as represented in paintings like Saint Francis Comforted by an Angel. His works vary between the Zurbaránesque tenebrism of the Ecstasy of St Francis and a softly luminous style (as in Death of St Clare) that became typical of Murillo's mature work. According to the art historian Manuela B. Mena Marqués, "in ... the Levitation of St Giles (usually known as The Angels' Kitchen) and the Death of St Clare (Dresden, Gemäldegal. Alte Meister), the characteristic elements of Murillo's work are already evident: the elegance and beauty of the female figures and the angels, the realism of the still-life details and the fusion of reality with the spiritual world, which is extraordinarily well developed in some of the compositions." Similarly in Saint Diego Giving Alms, Murillo carefully places the subjects on parallel planes over black background, and its center, surrounding a boiling pot, are a group of children seemingly bathed in a heavenly glow. In doing so, Murillo managed to combine both tenebrism and luminosity to showcase the glory of aiding the needy and the innocent.

Also completed c. 1645 was the first of Murillo's many paintings of children, The Young Beggar (Musée du Louvre), in which the influence of Velázquez is apparent. Following the completion of a pair of pictures for the Seville Cathedral, he began to specialize in the themes that brought him his greatest successes: the Virgin and Child and the Immaculate Conception.

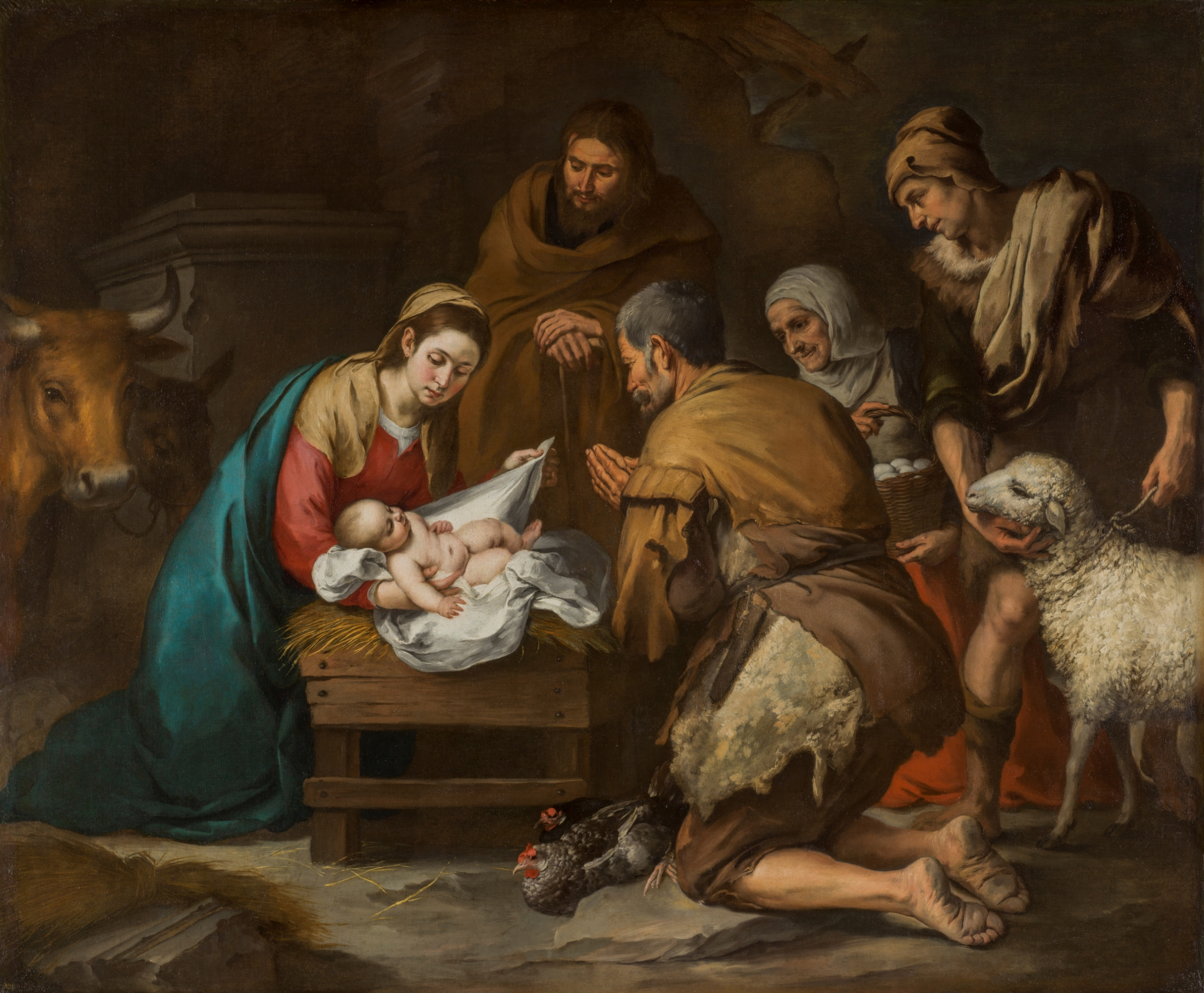
The Adoration of the Shepherds, c. 1650, Museo del Prado

After another period in Madrid, from 1658 to 1660, he returned to Seville. Here he was one of the founders of the Academia de Bellas Artes (Academy of Art), sharing its direction, in 1660, with the architect Francisco Herrera the Younger. This was his period of greatest activity, and he received numerous important commissions, among them the altarpieces for the Augustinian monastery, the paintings for Santa María la Blanca (completed in 1665), and others.

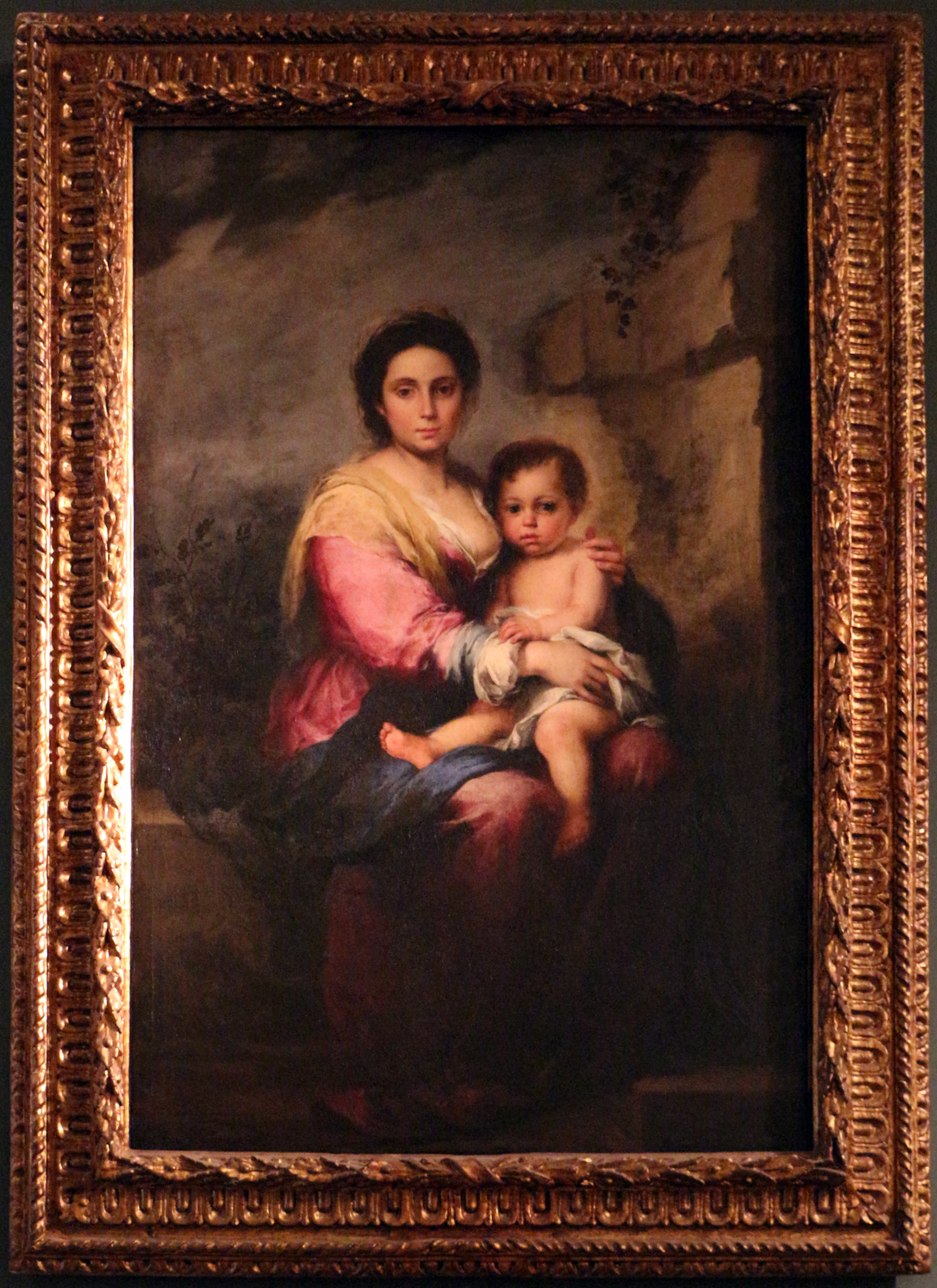
Murillo, Madonna and Child (Nursing Madonna or Gypsy Madonna), c. 1675–1679, Galleria Corsini, Rome

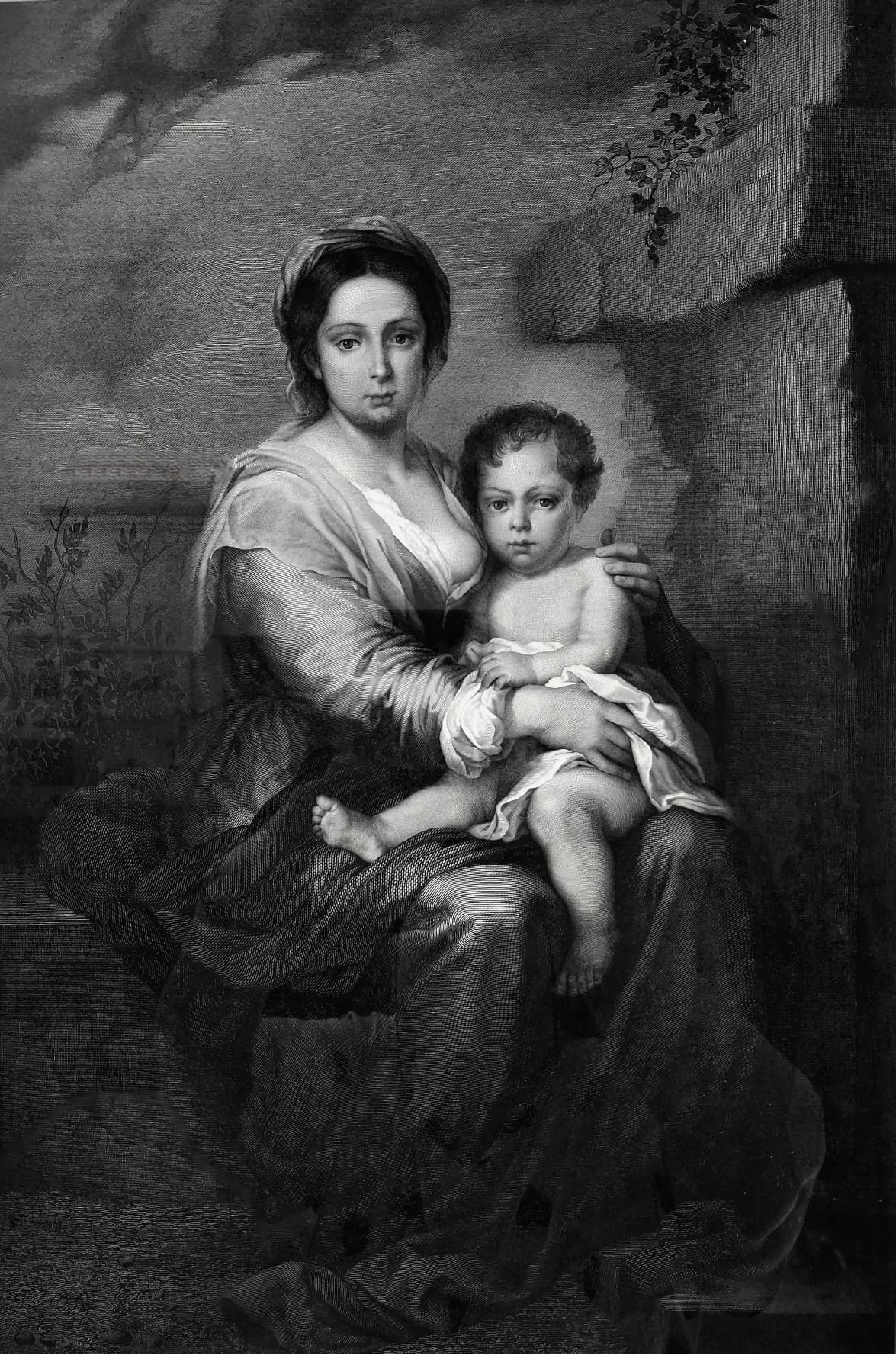
Francesco Di Bartolo, Madonna and Child after Murillo, burin engraving, 1882, Natalia Di Bartolo Collection, Catania

One of Murillo's late devotional paintings is the Madonna and Child, also known as the Nursing Madonna or Gypsy Madonna, dated c. 1675–1679 and held by the Galleria Corsini in Rome. In 1877 the Italian engraver Francesco Di Bartolo was commissioned by the Regia Calcografia to prepare a charcoal drawing after the painting, on condition that he would also be entrusted with the engraving. The drawing was approved in 1878, and the burin engraving was completed and published in Rome in 1882. The work documents the 19th-century reception of Murillo in Italy through official reproductive engraving.

Murillo died in Seville in 1682, a few months after he fell from a scaffold while working on a fresco at the church of the Capuchines in Cádiz.

== Legacy ==
Murillo had many pupils and followers. The prolific imitation of his paintings ensured his reputation in Spain and fame throughout Europe, and before the 19th century his work was more widely known than that of any other Spanish artist. Artists influenced by his style included Gainsborough and Greuze. Google marked the 400 years since Murillo's birth with a doodle on 29 November 2018.

== Public collections ==
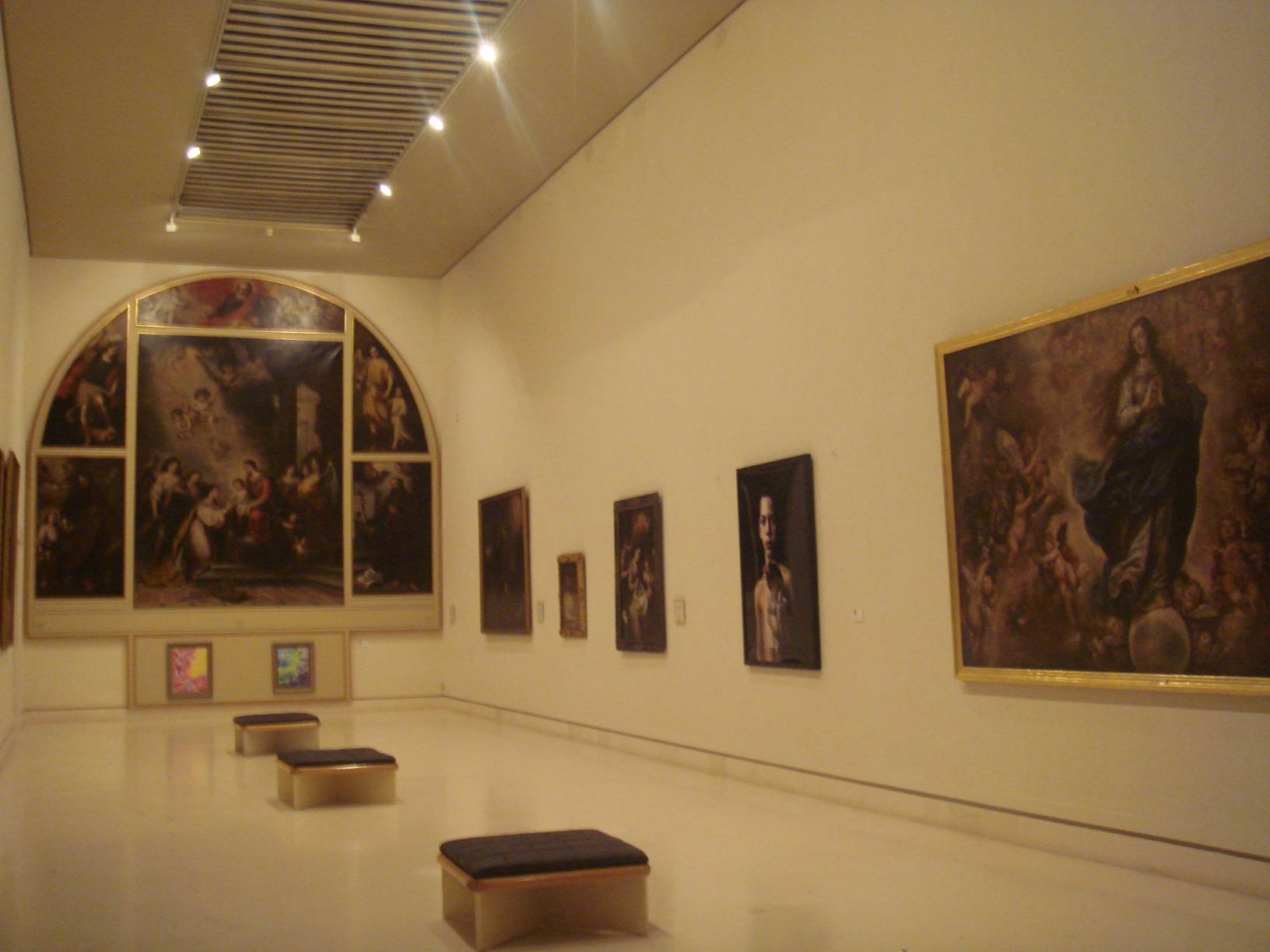
The Murillo Room in the Museum of Cádiz

The Museo del Prado in Madrid; Hermitage Museum in Saint Petersburg, Russia (such as Boy with a Dog); and the Wallace Collection in London are among the museums holding works by Murillo. His painting "The Coronation in Heaven of the Mother of God" is on display at the Basilica of St. Joseph Proto-Cathedral in Bardstown Kentucky. His painting Christ on the Cross is at the Timken Museum of Art in San Diego. Christ After the Flagellation is at the Krannert Art Museum, Champaign, Illinois. His work is also found at the Mabee-Gerrer Museum of Art in Shawnee, Oklahoma, and at the Meadows Museum at Southern Methodist University in Dallas, Texas. The National Gallery of Ireland holds a series of six paintings by Murillo depicting the parable of the prodigal son.

== Selected works ==
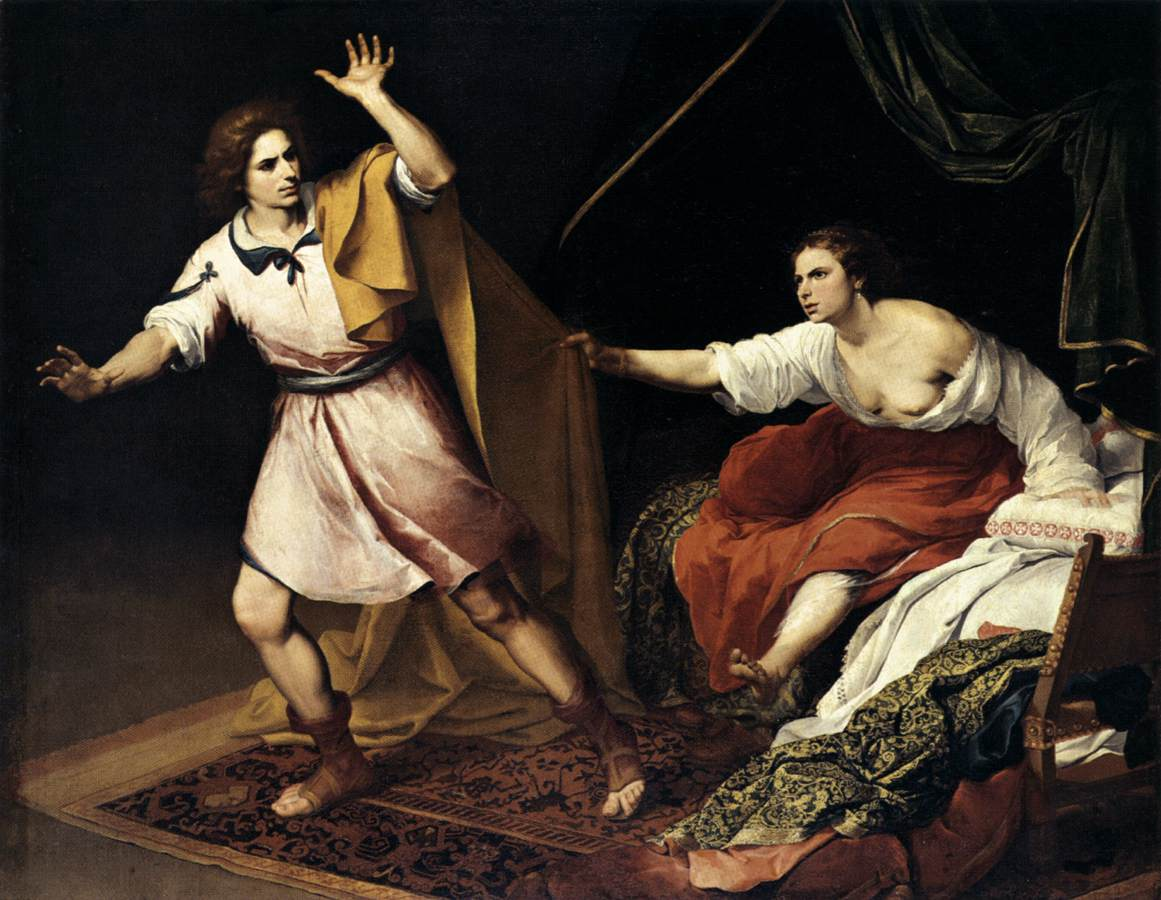
Joseph and Potiphar's Wife, c. 1640–1645, Gemäldegalerie Alte Meister, Kassel

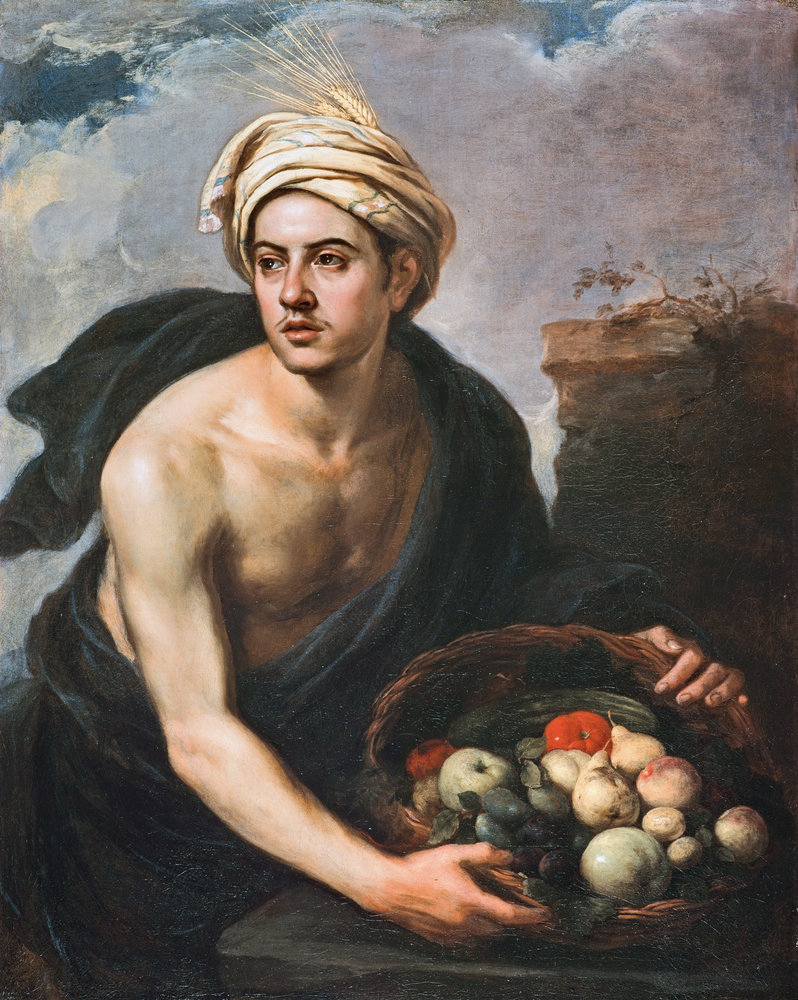
Young Man with a Basket of Fruit or Personification of Summer, c. 1640–1650, National Galleries of Scotland

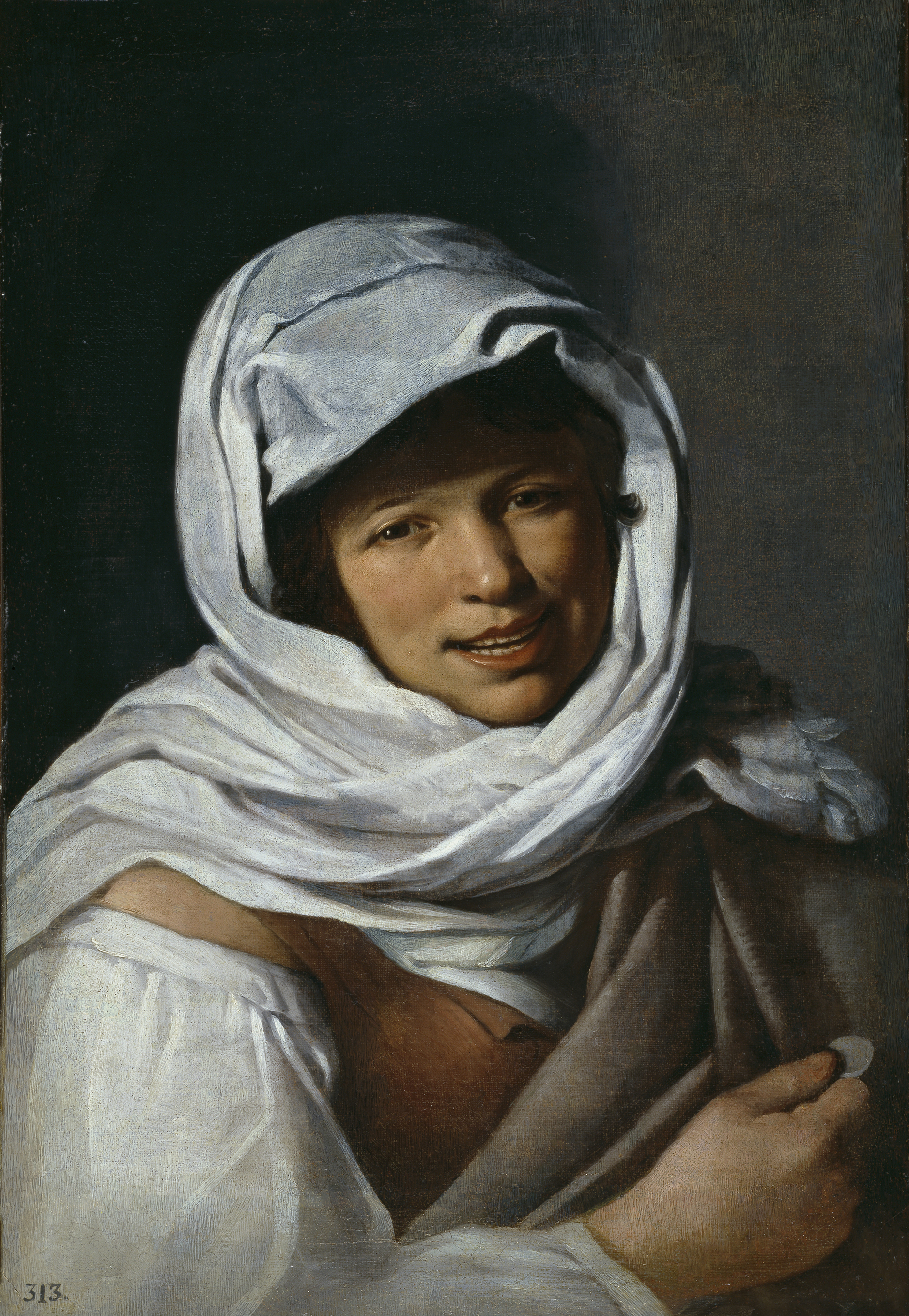
The Girl with a Coin or Girl of Galicia, c. 1645–1650, Museo del Prado

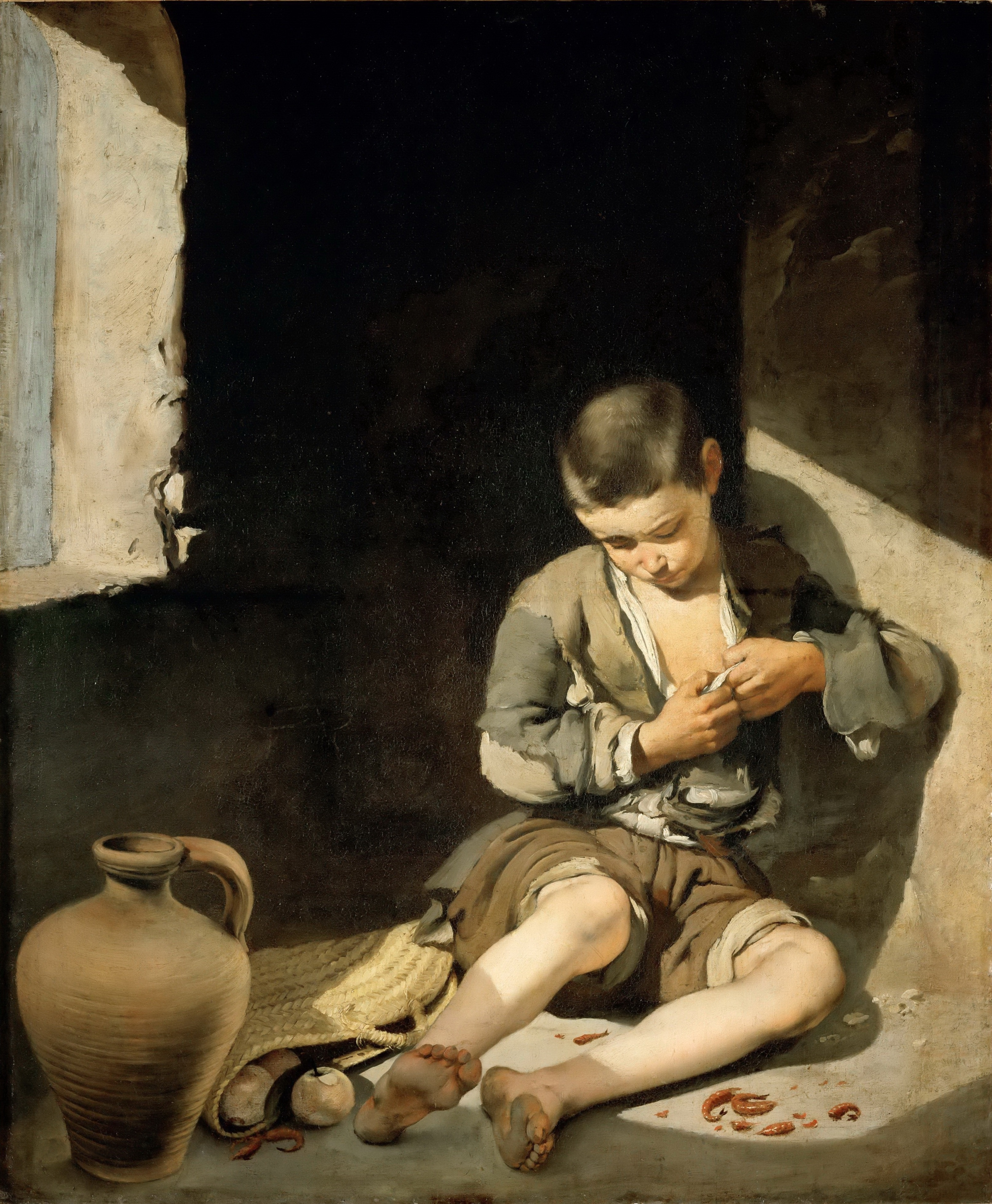
The Young Beggar, c. 1645, Musée du Louvre, Paris

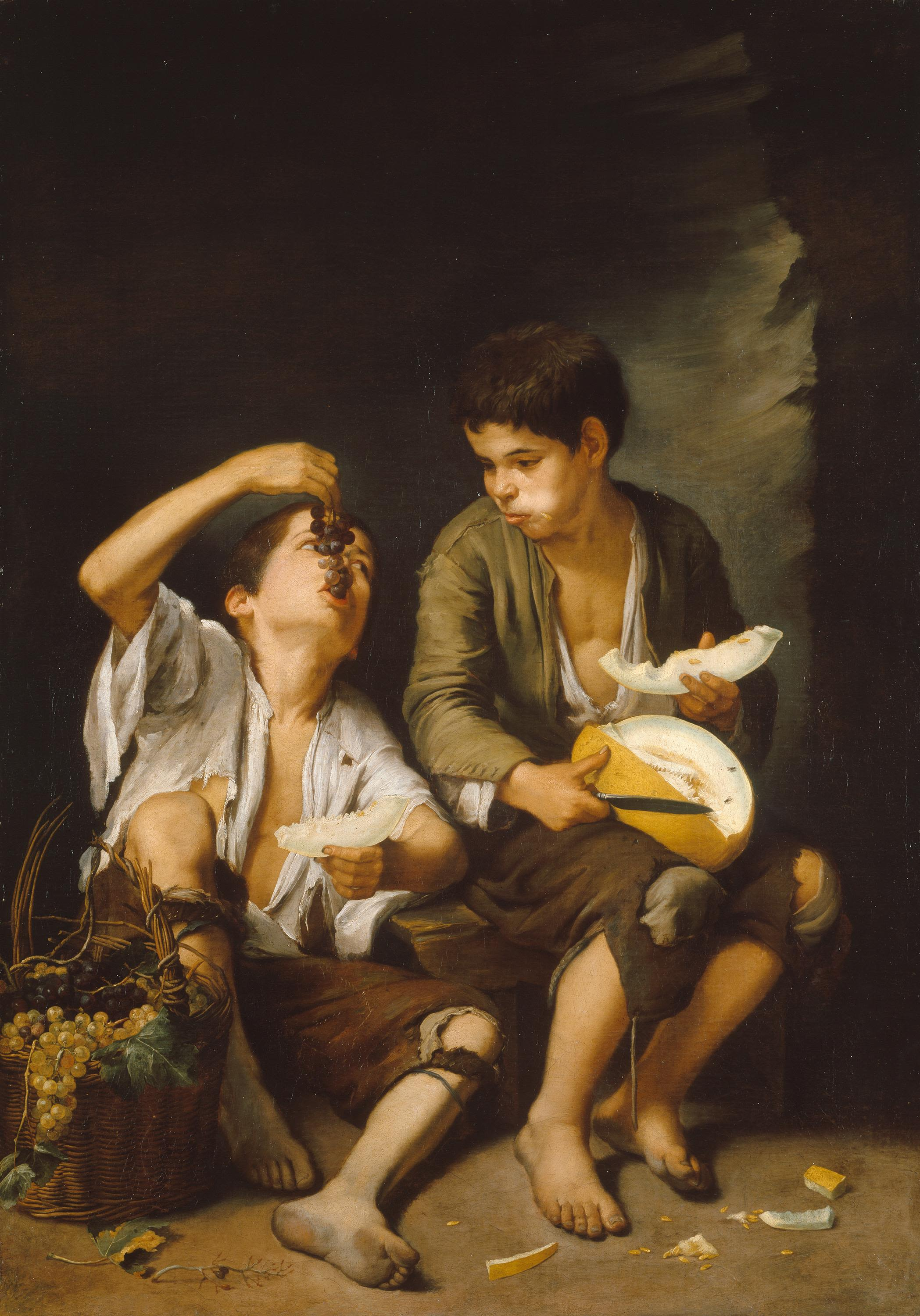
Boys Eating Grapes and Melon, c. 1645–46, Alte Pinakothek, Munich

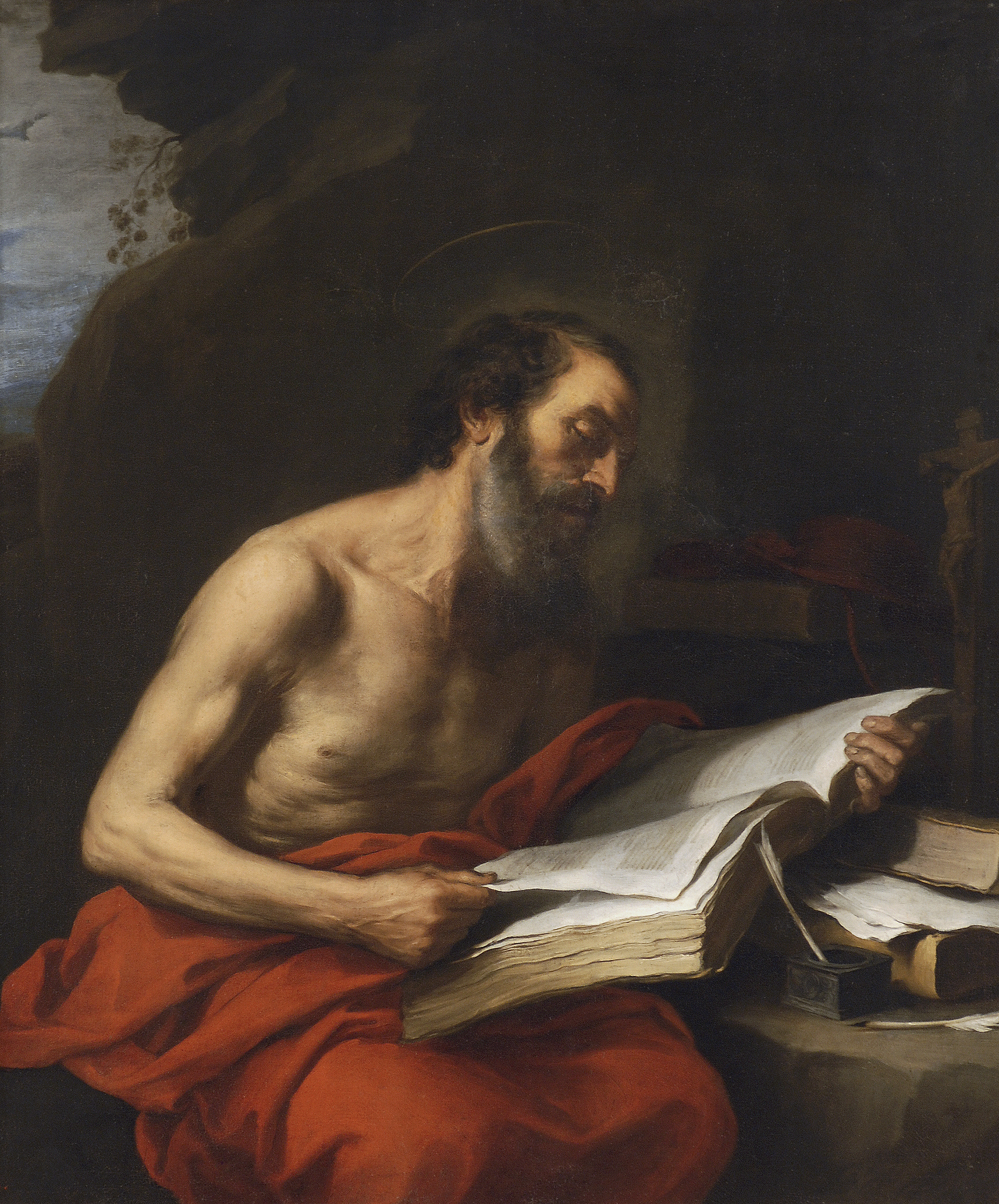
St. Jerome, c. 1650–1652, Museo del Prado

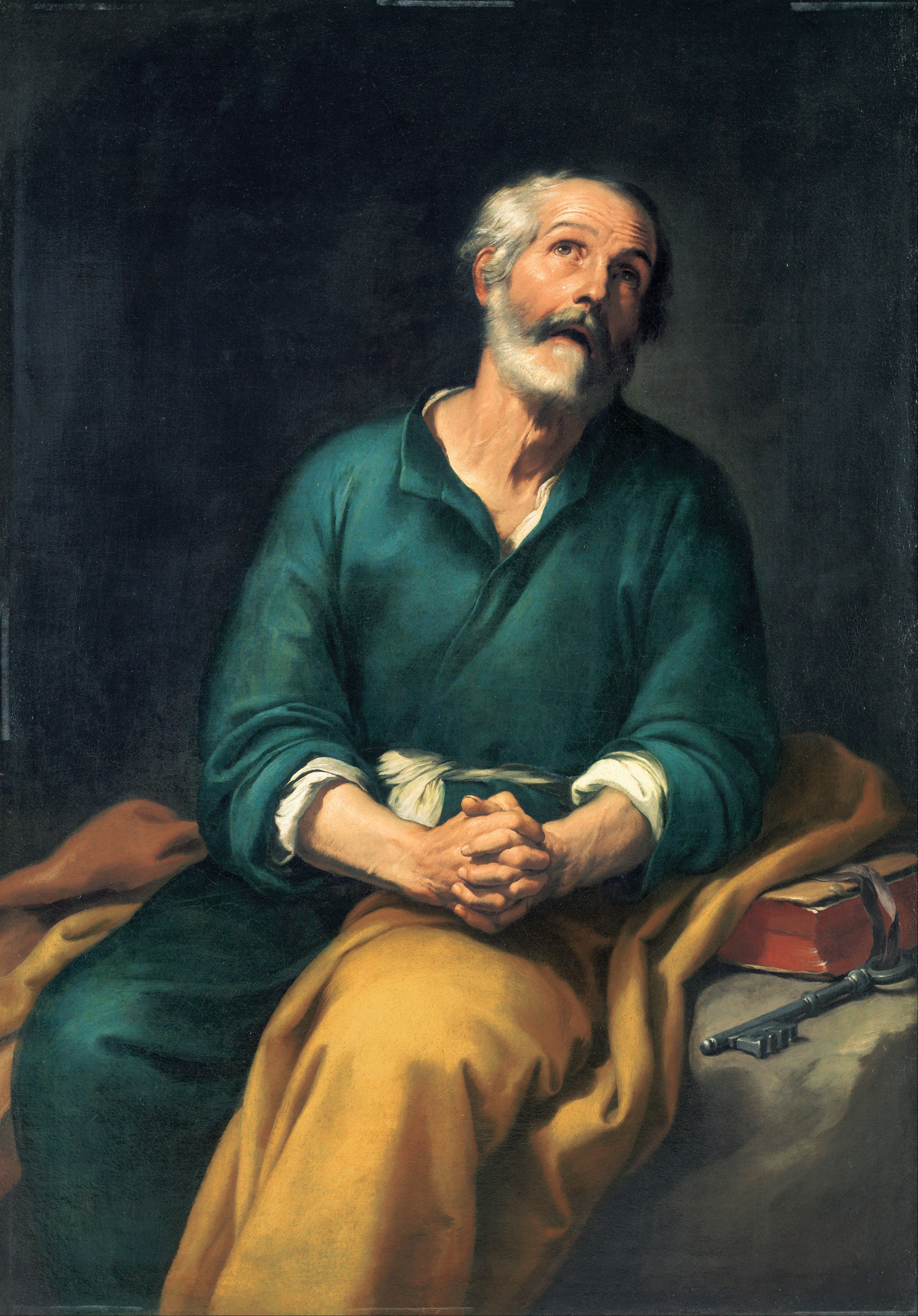
St. Peter in Tears, c. 1650–1655, Bilbao Fine Arts Museum

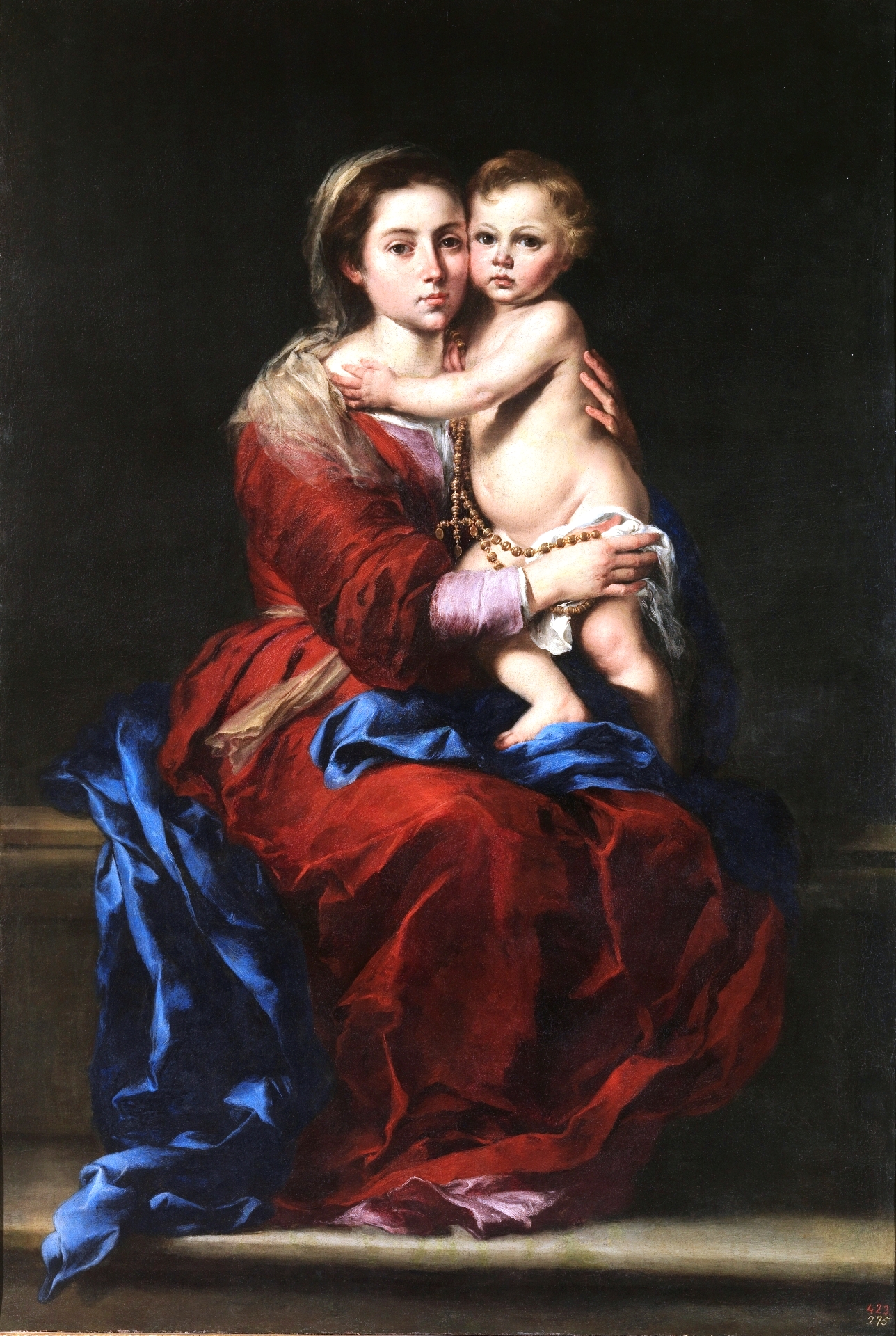
The Virgin of the Rosary, c. 1650–1655, Museo del Prado

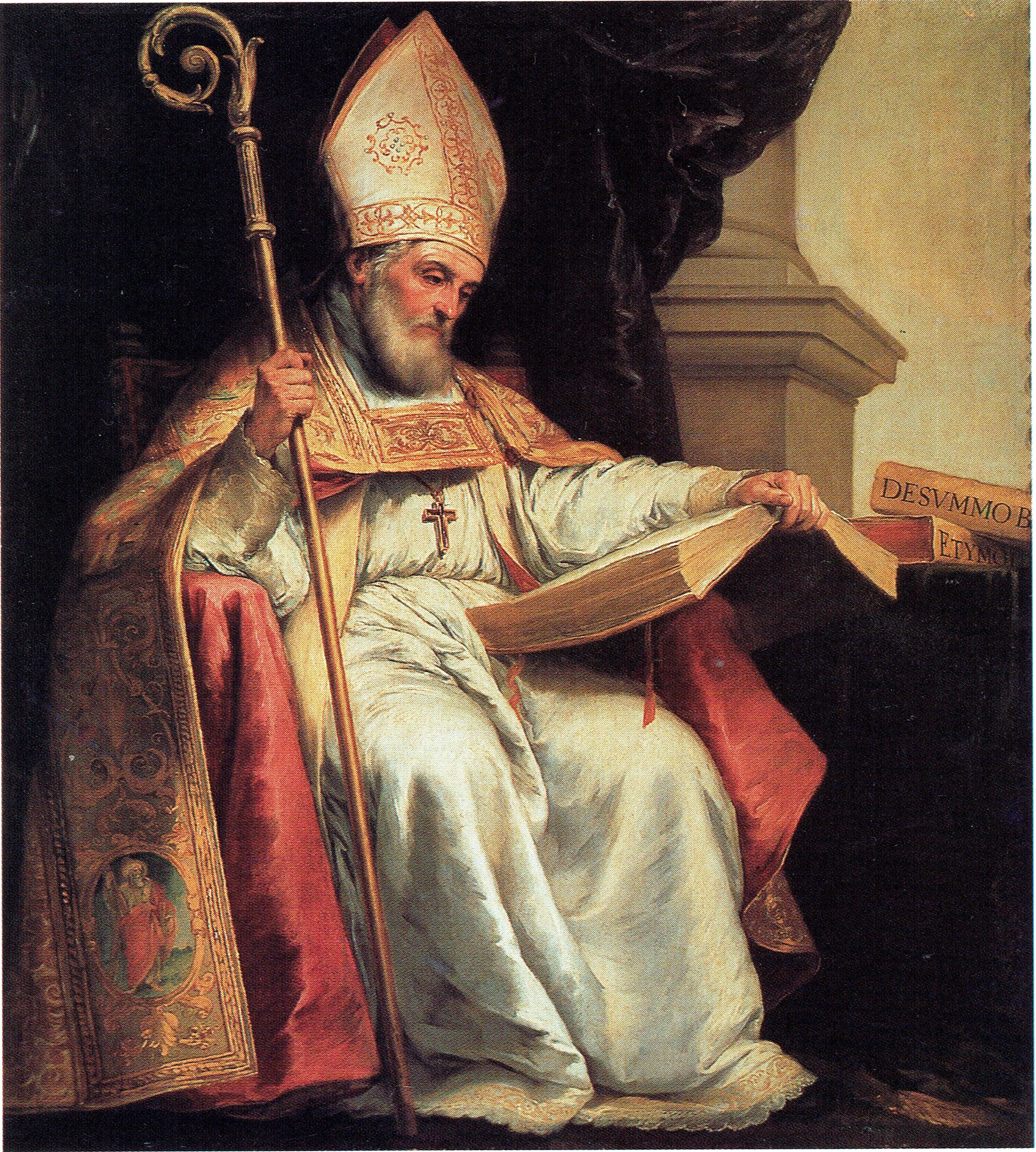
St. Isidore of Sevilla, 1654, Cathedral of Seville, Spain

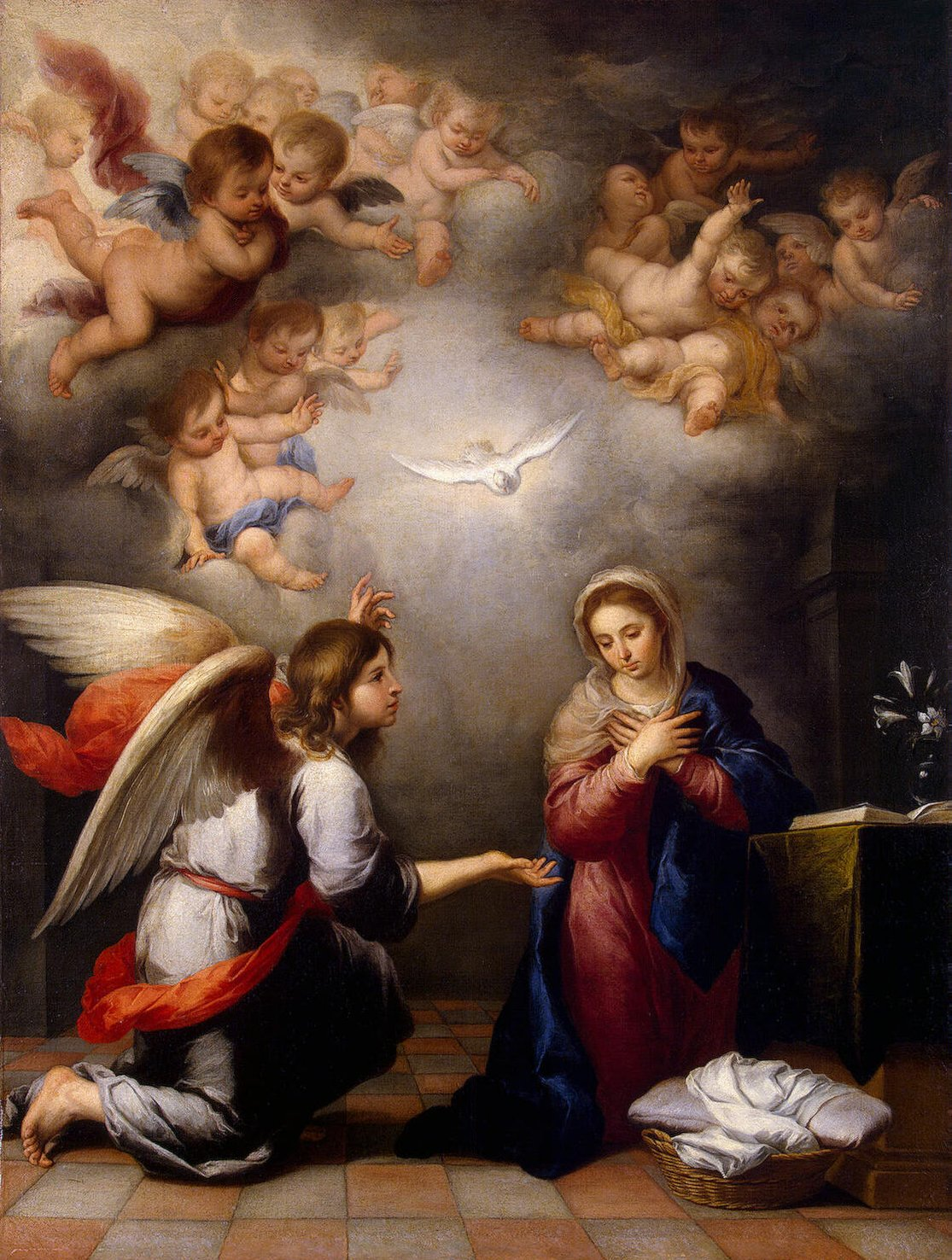
Annunciation, c. 1655–1660, Hermitage Museum, Saint Petersburg

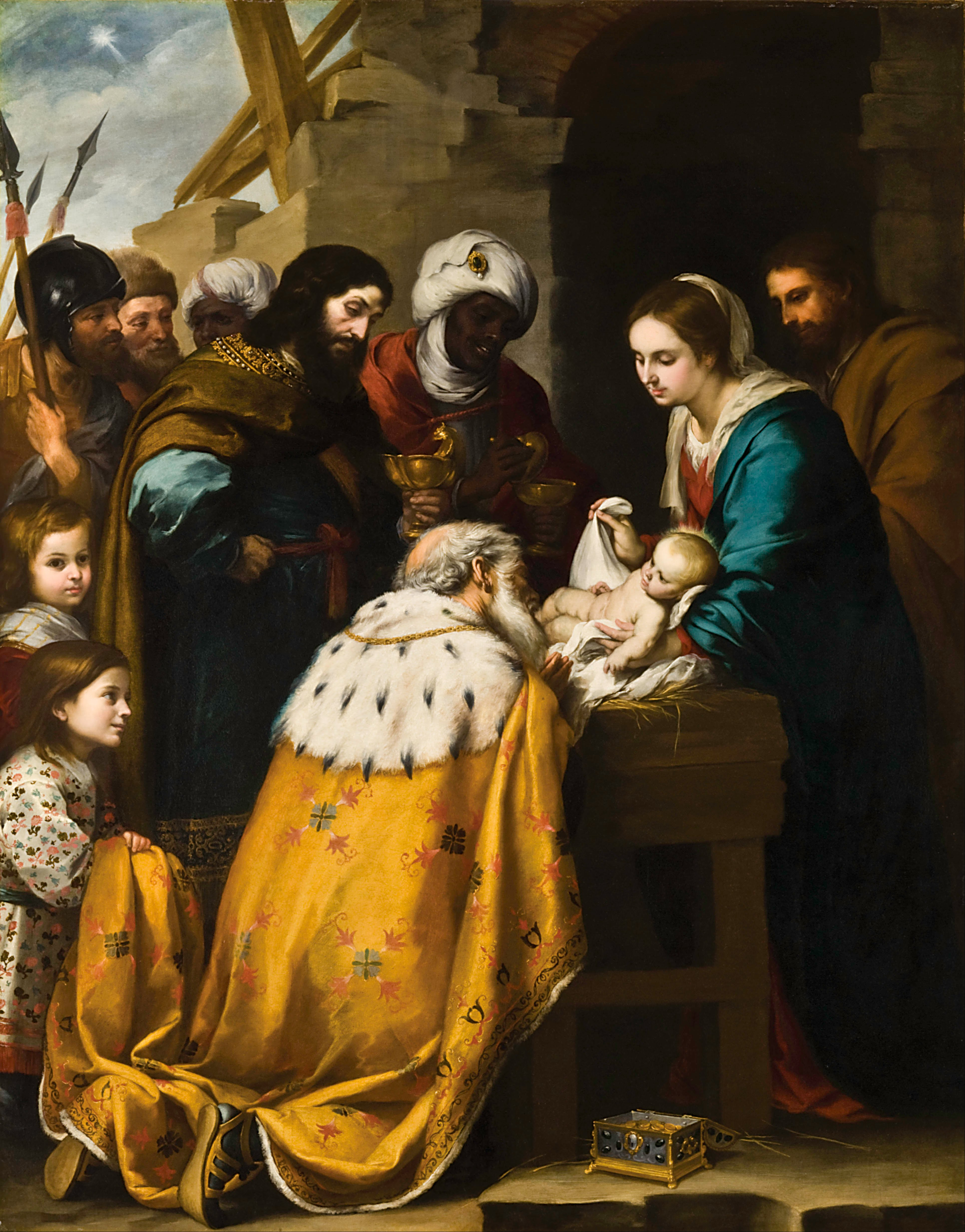
Adoration of the Magi, c. 1660, Toledo Museum of Art

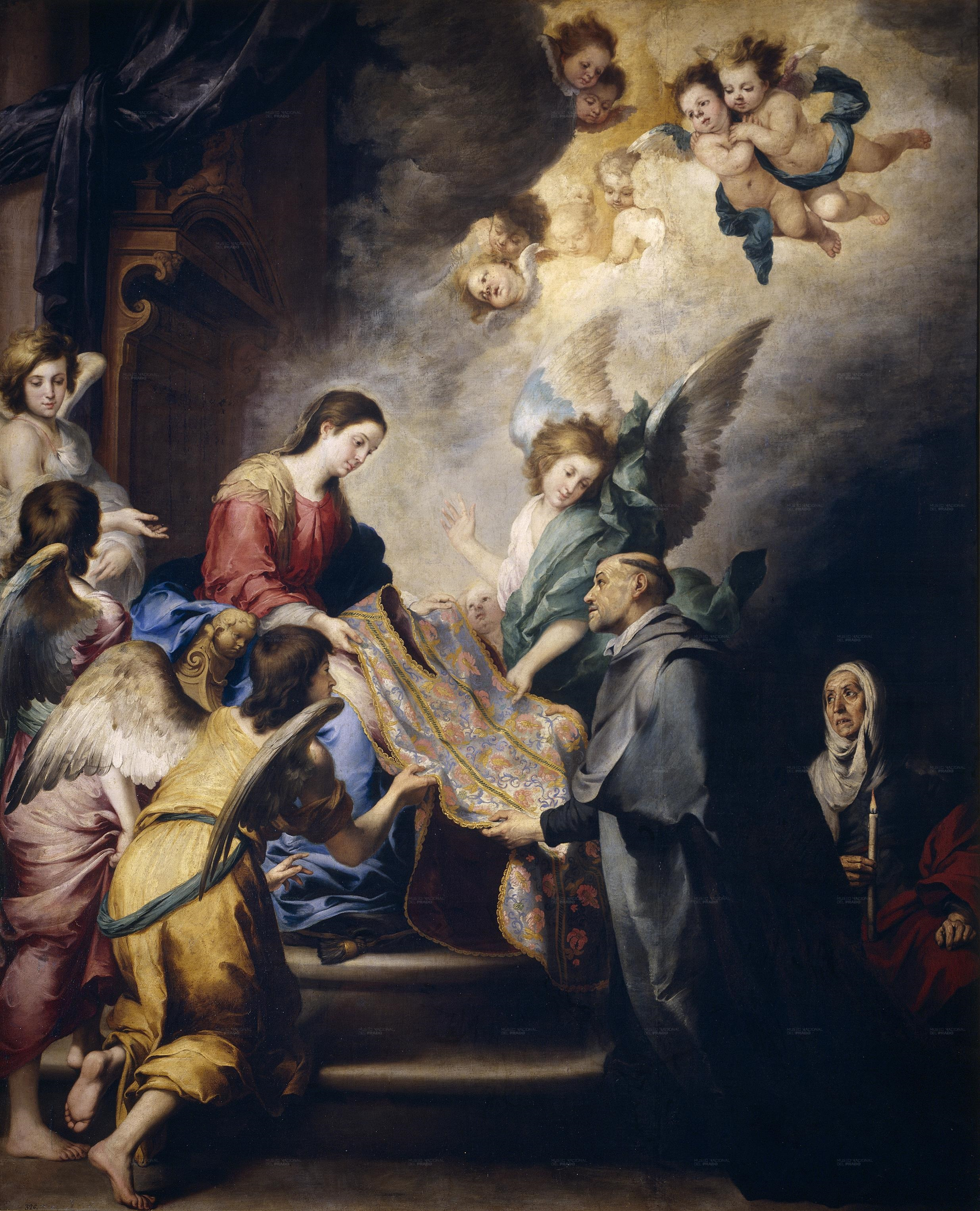
Apparition of the Virgin to St. Ildefonsus, c. 1660, Museo del Prado

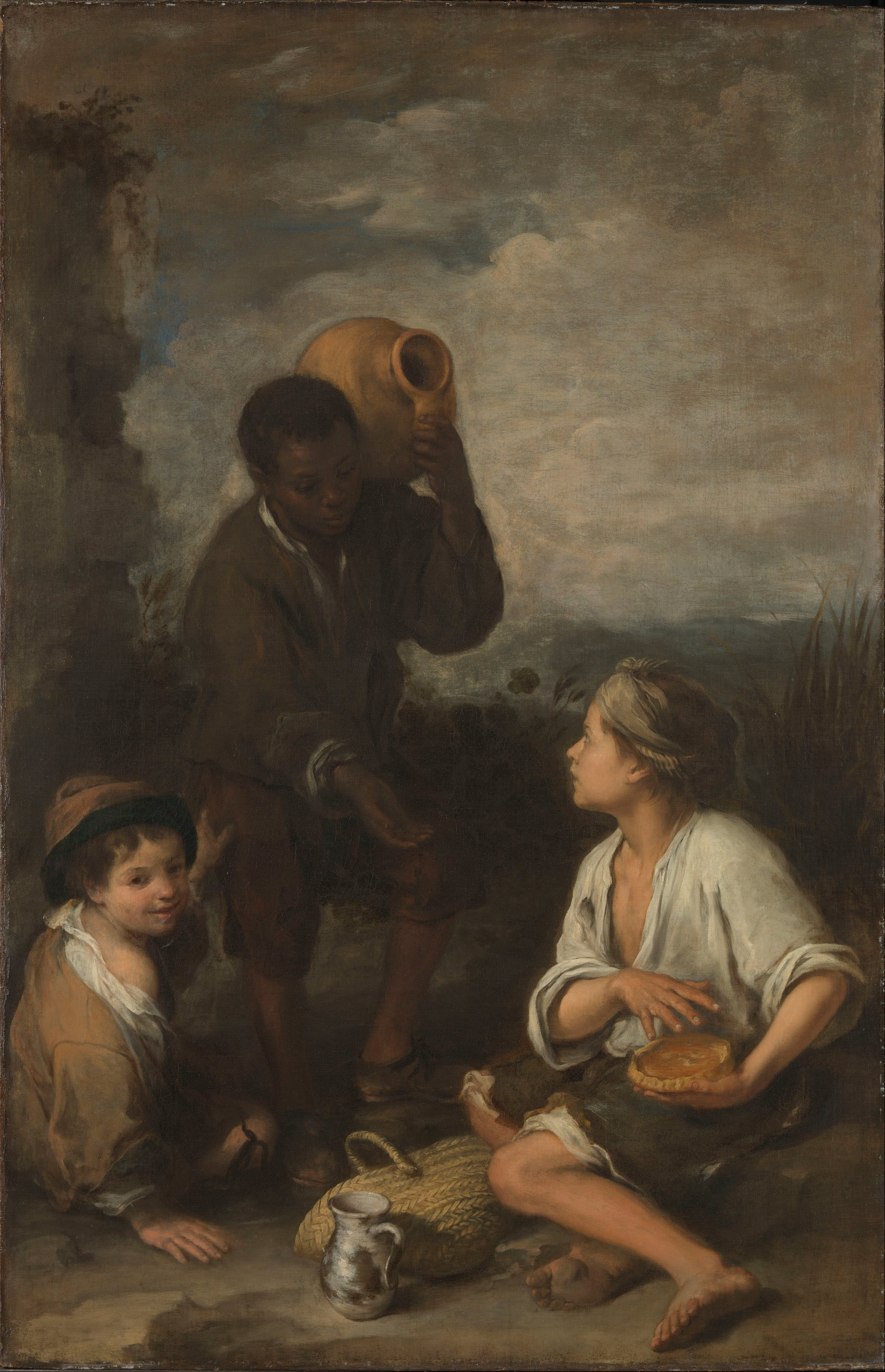
Three Boys, c. 1660, Dulwich Picture Gallery

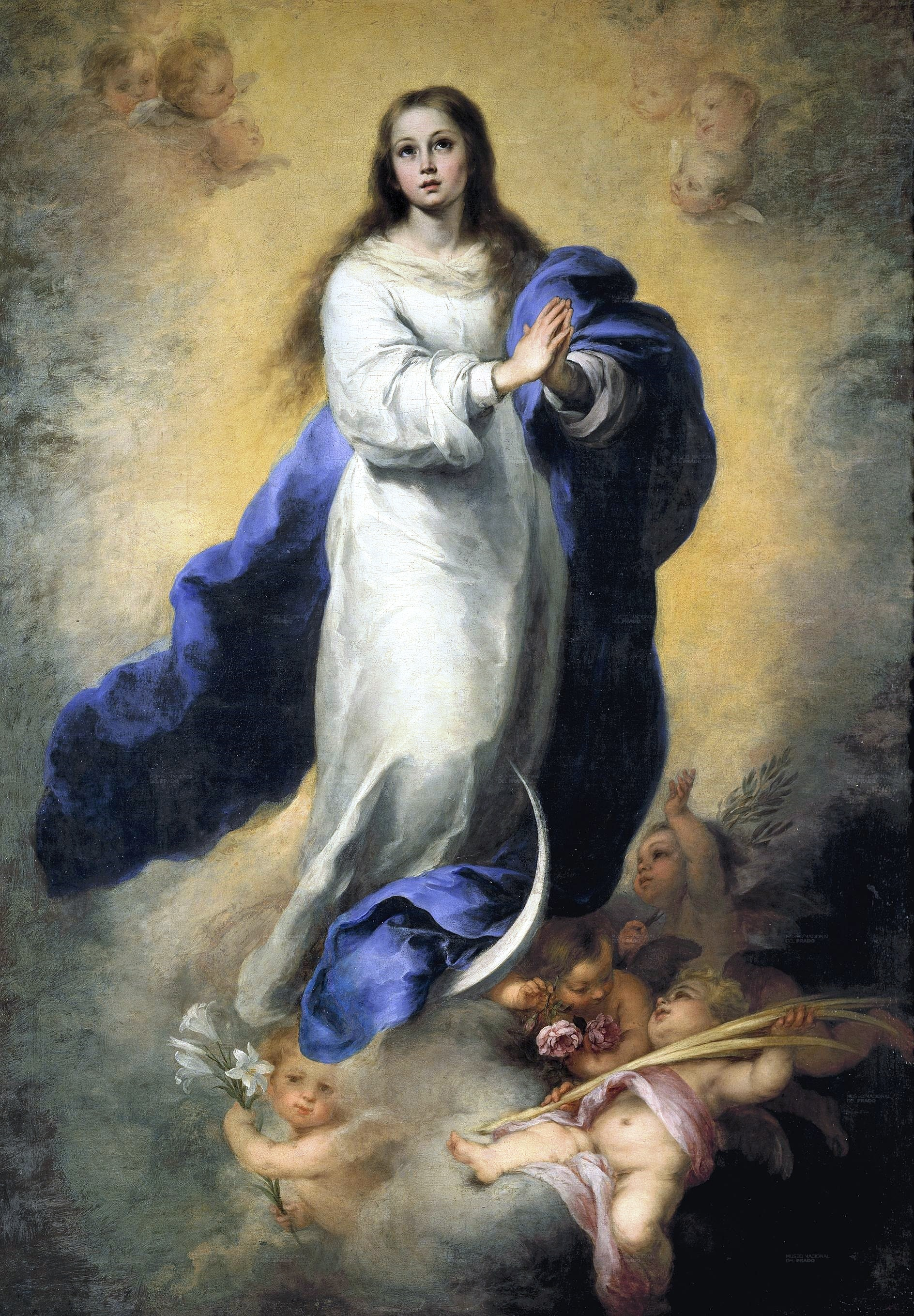
The Immaculate Conception of El Escorial, c. 1660–1665, Museo del Prado

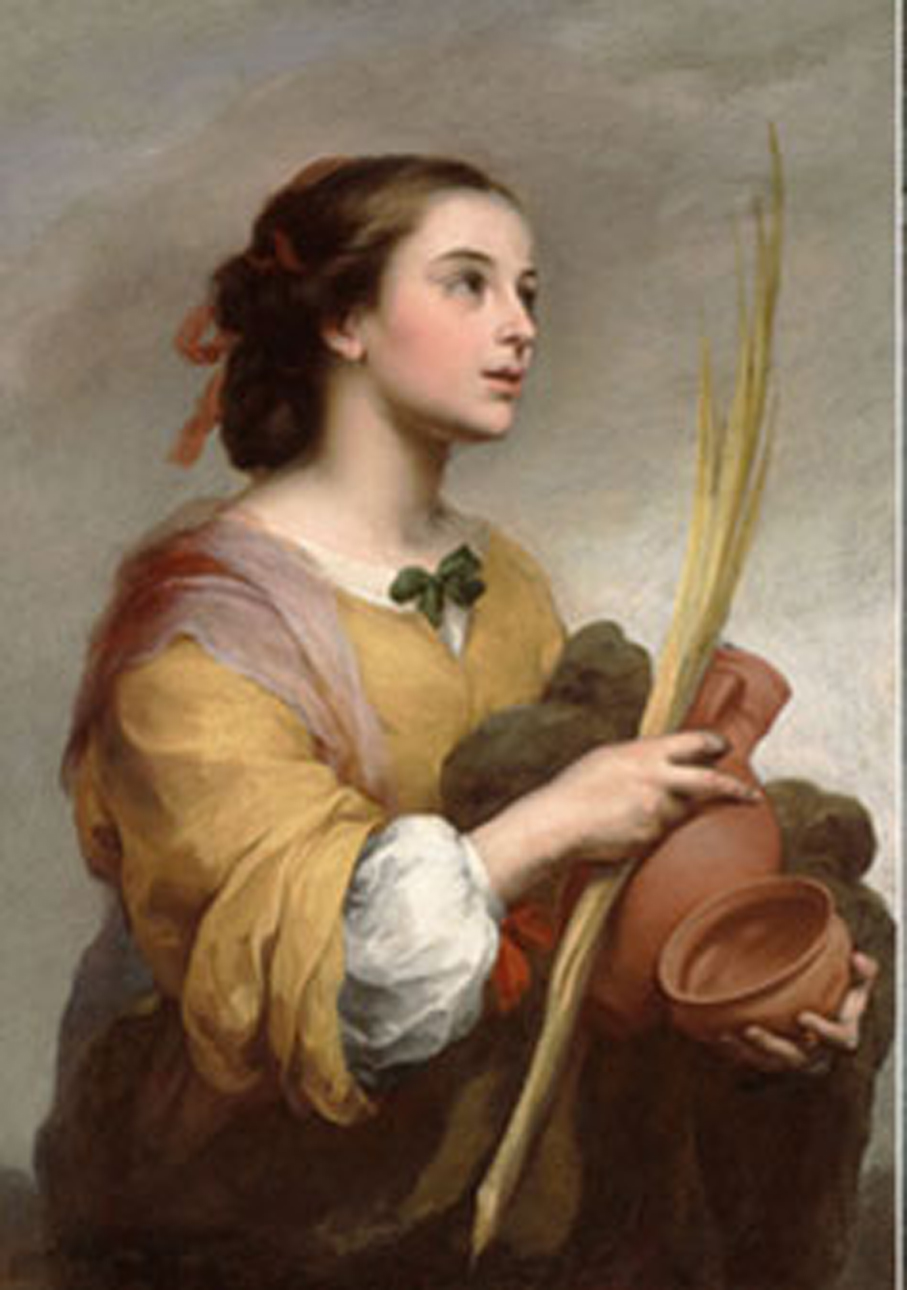
St. Justa, c. 1665, Meadows Museum

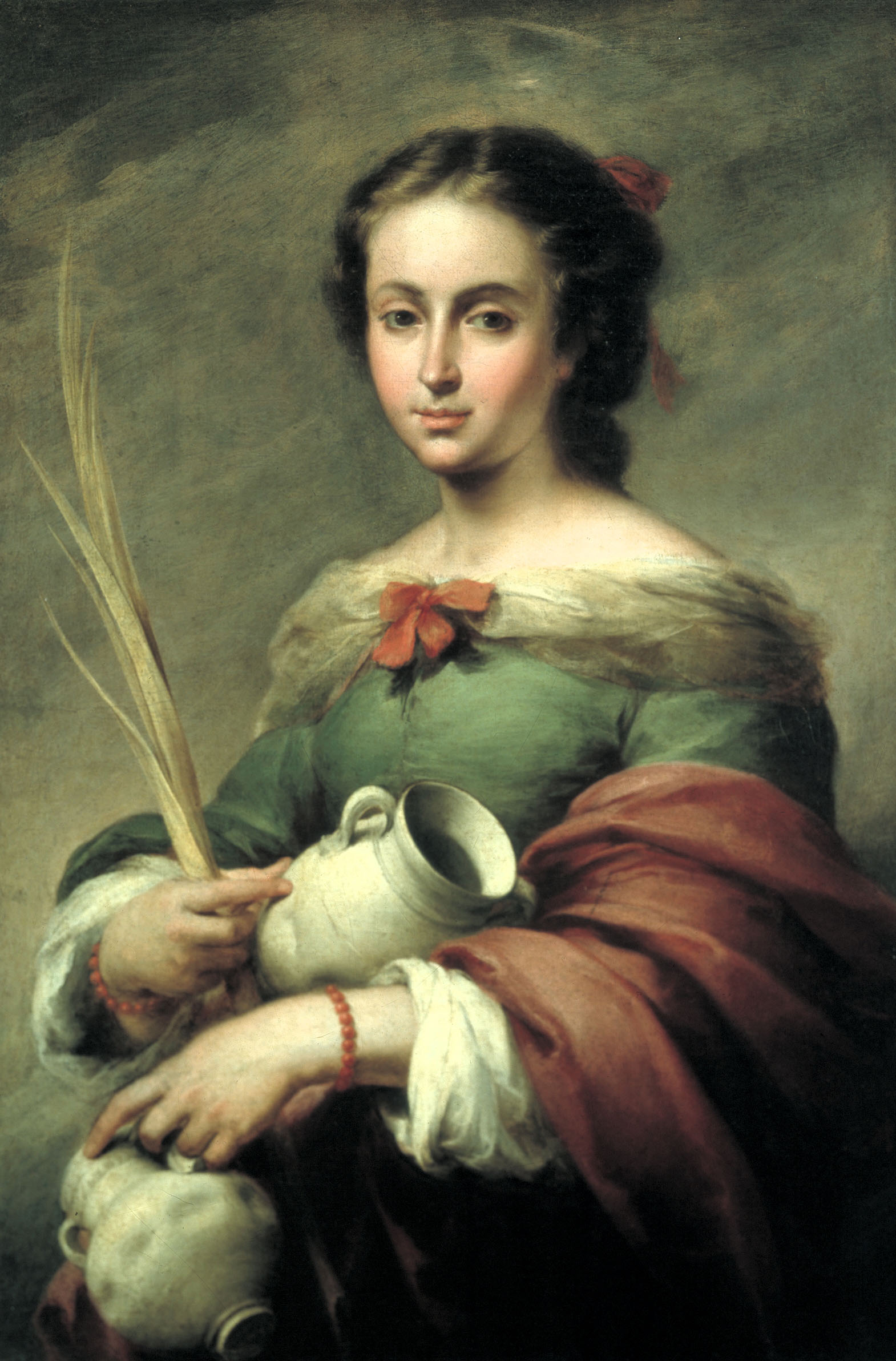
St. Rufina, c. 1665, Meadows Museum

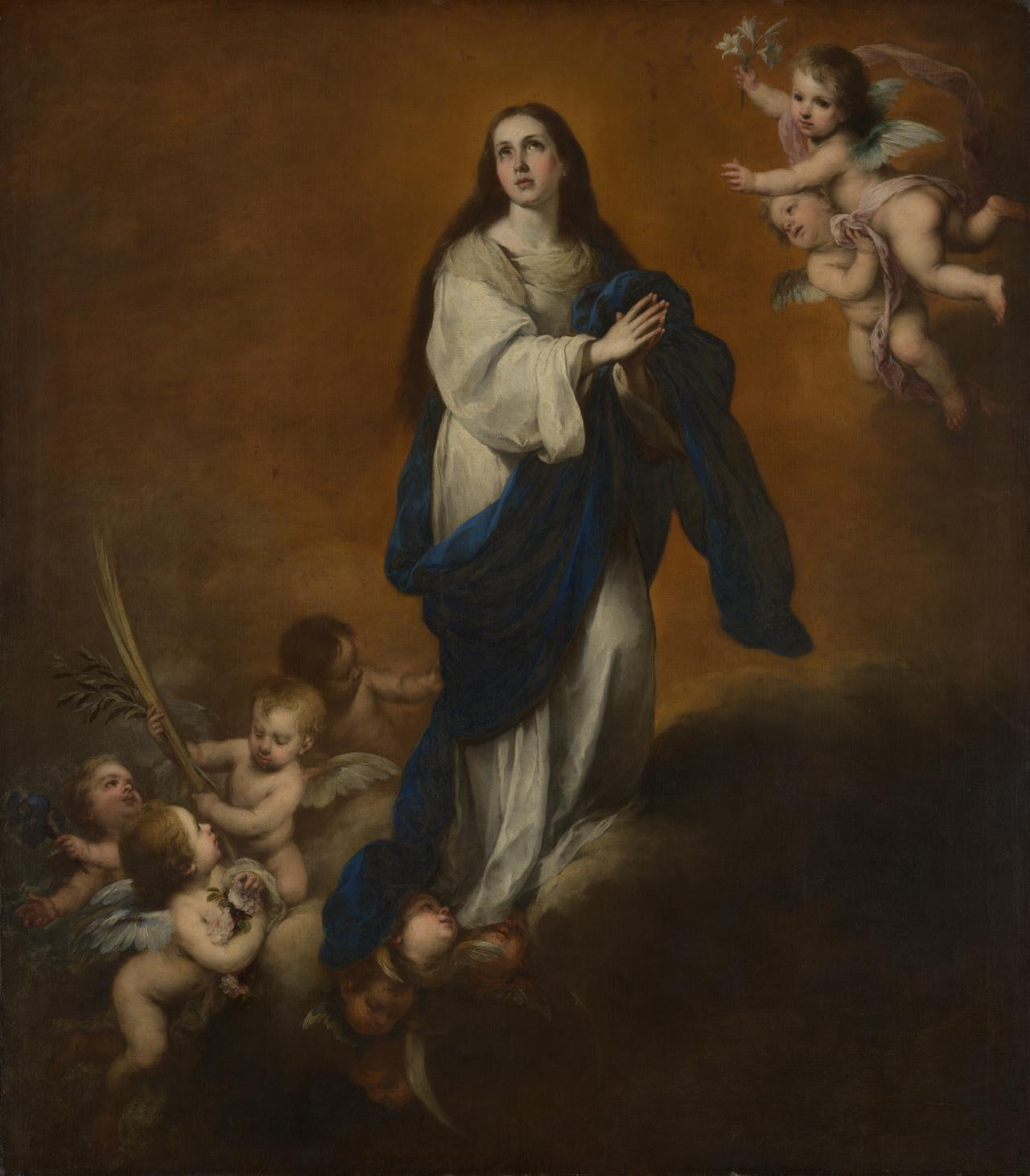
The Immaculate Conception, c. 1665, National Gallery of Victoria, Melbourne

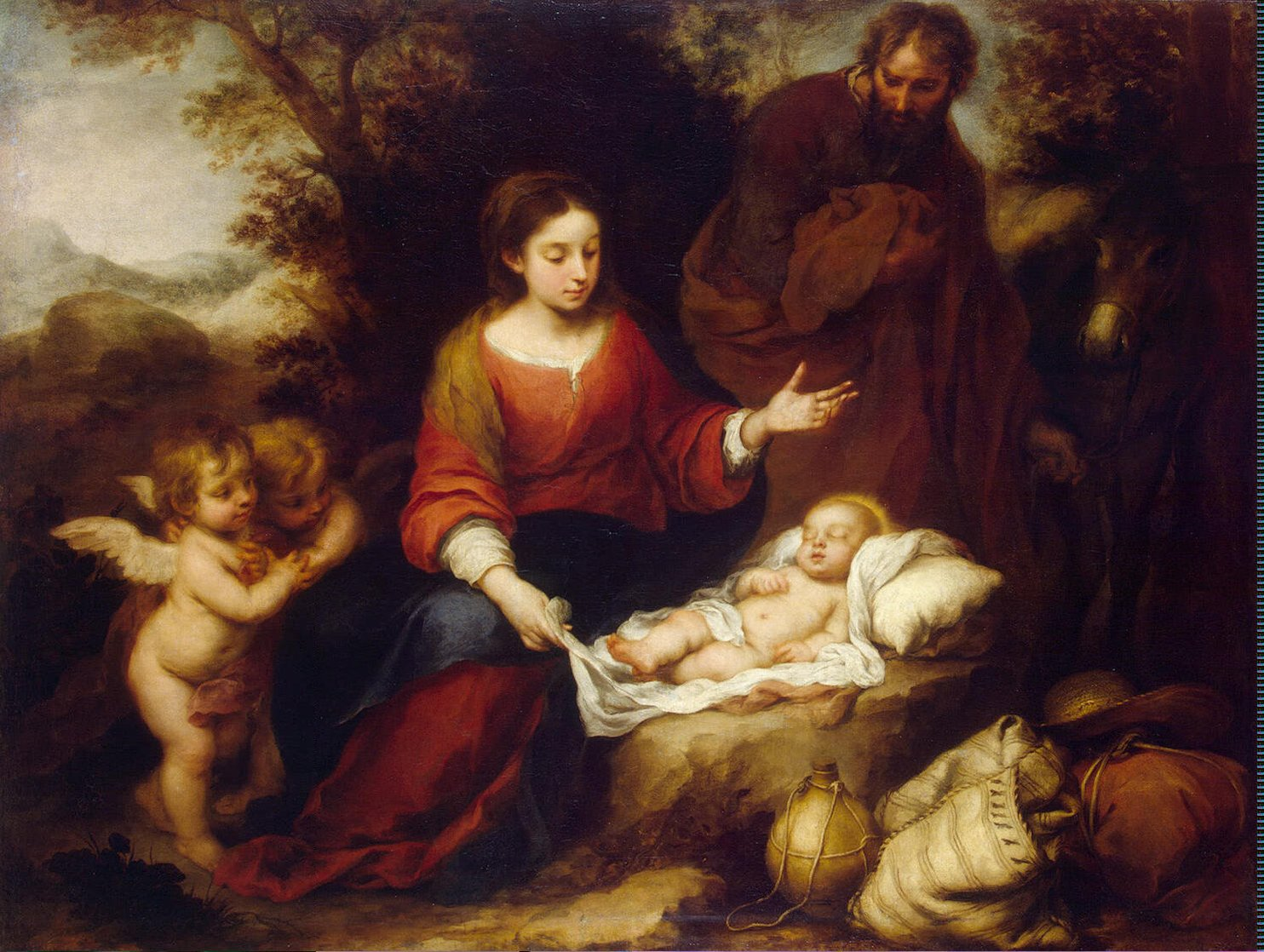
Rest on the Flight into Egypt, c. 1665, Hermitage Museum, Saint Petersburg

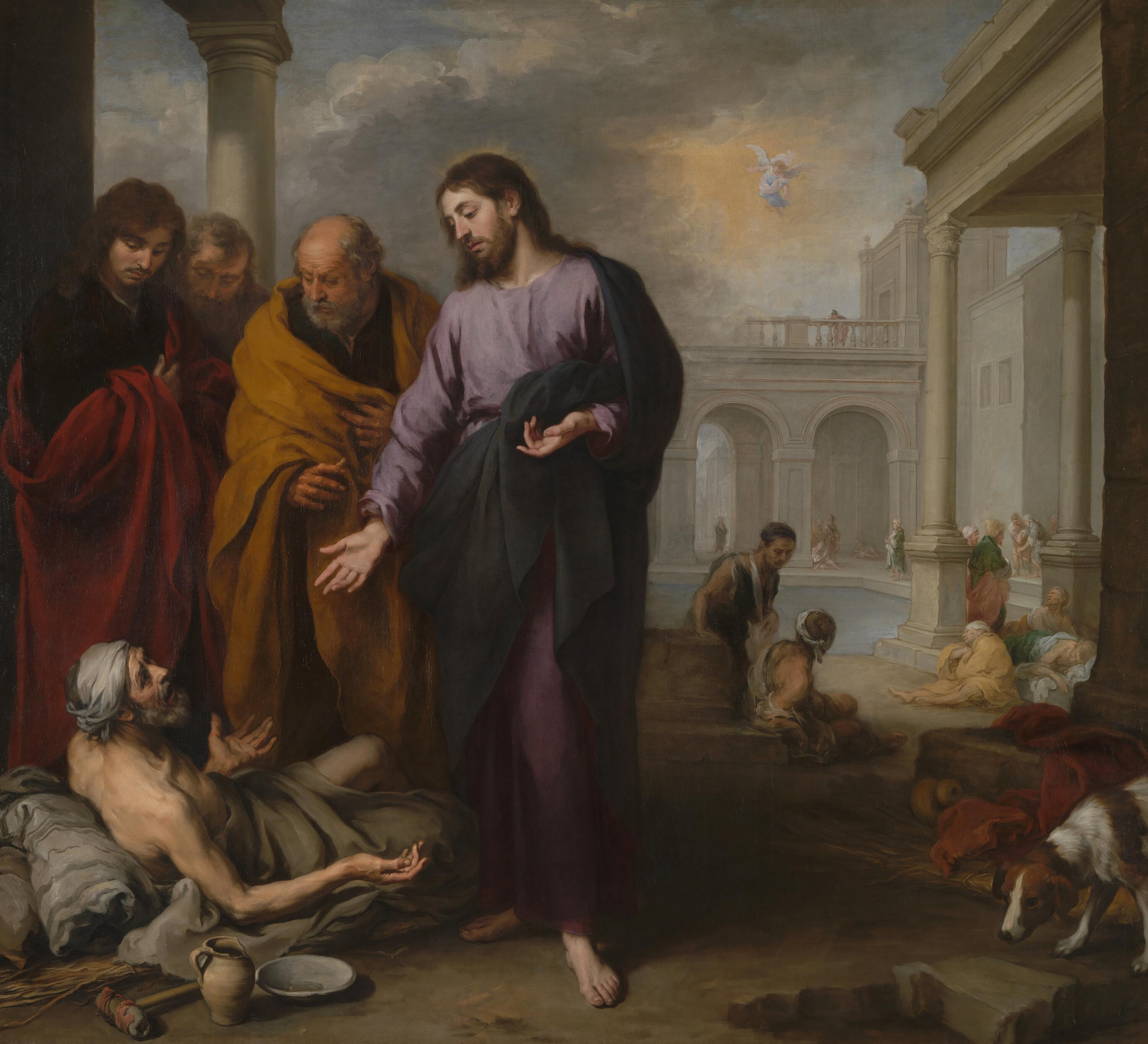
Christ Healing the Paralytic at the Pool of Bethesda, 1670, National Gallery, London

Saint Rose of Lima, c. 1670, Lazaro Galdiano Museum, Madrid

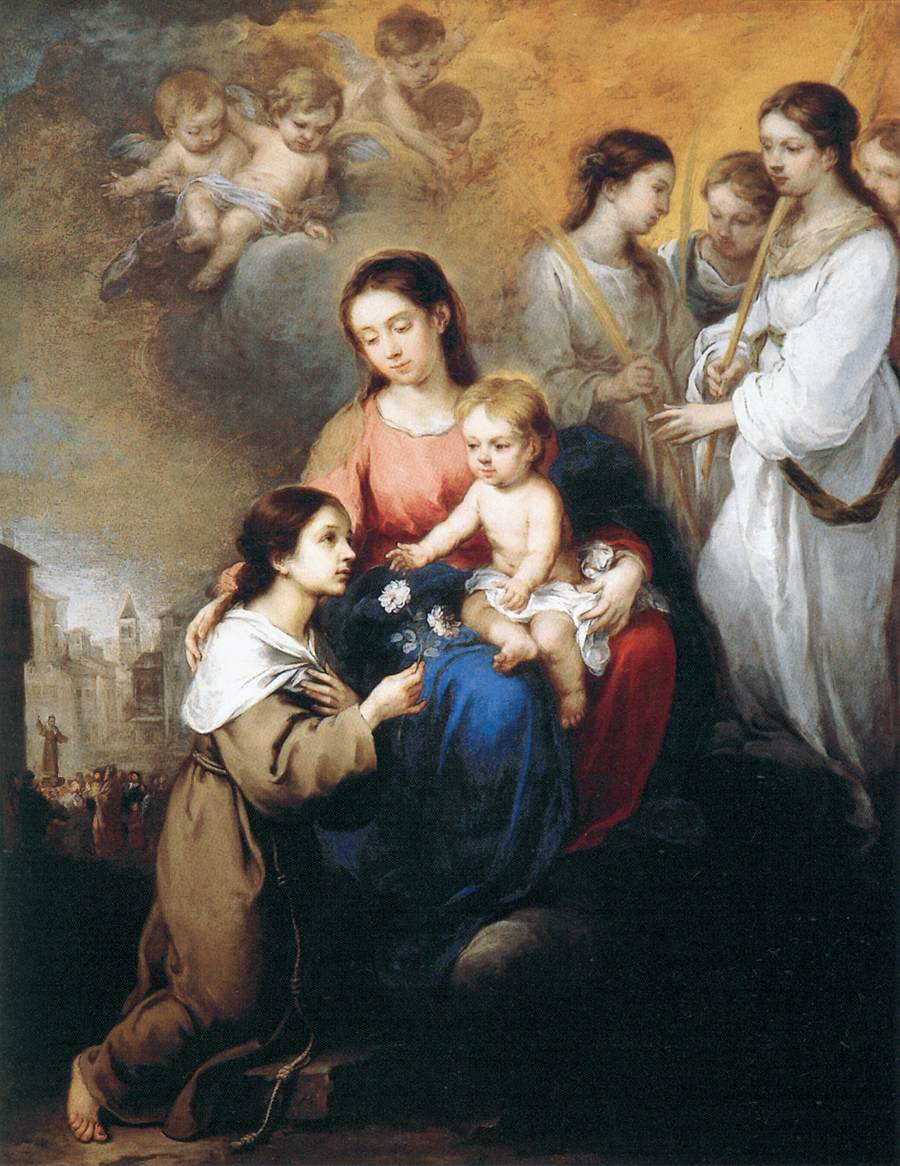
Virgin and Child with Saint Rose of Viterbo, c. 1670, Thyssen-Bornemisza Museum, Madrid

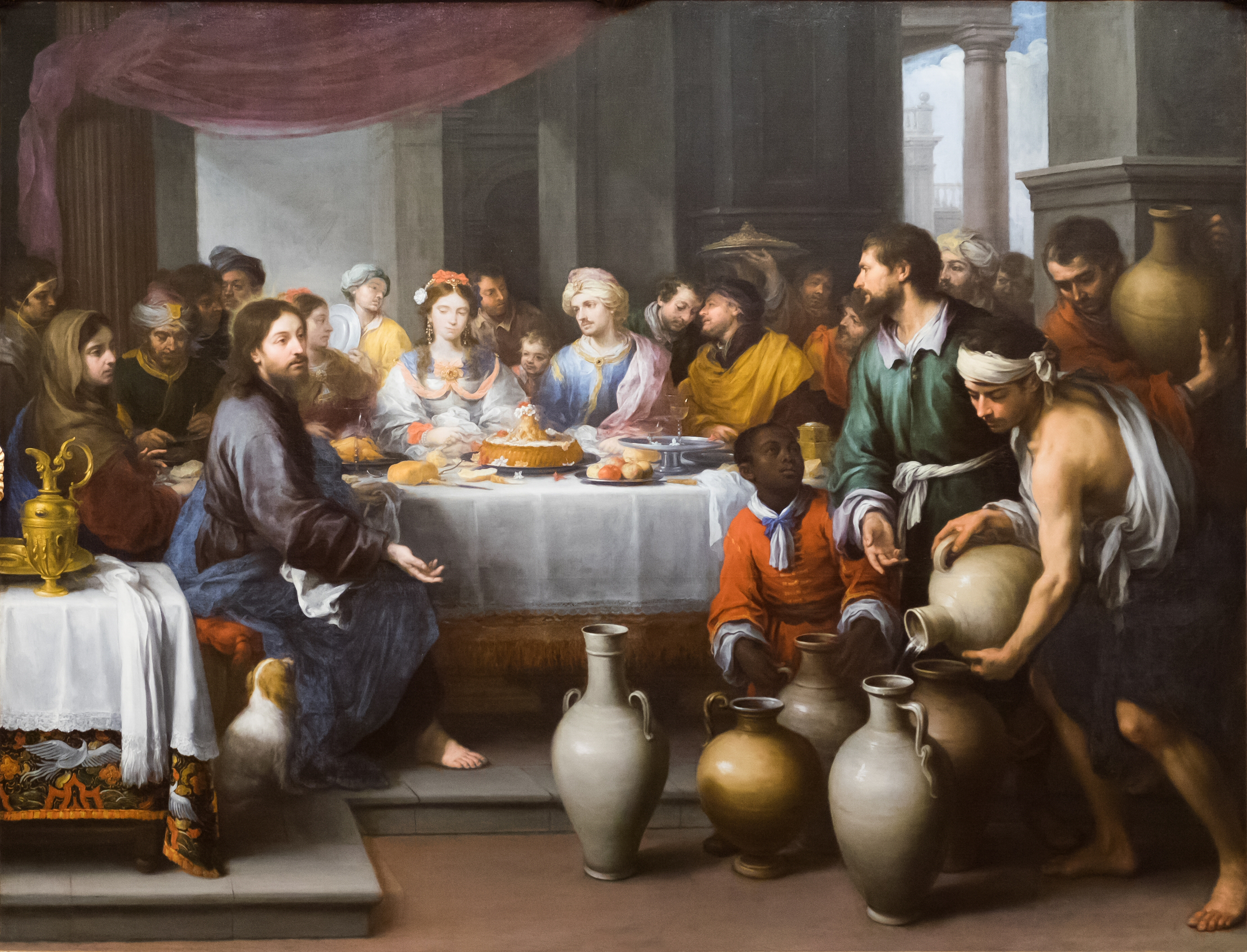
The Marriage Feast at Cana, c. 1672, The Barber Institute of Fine Arts, Birmingham

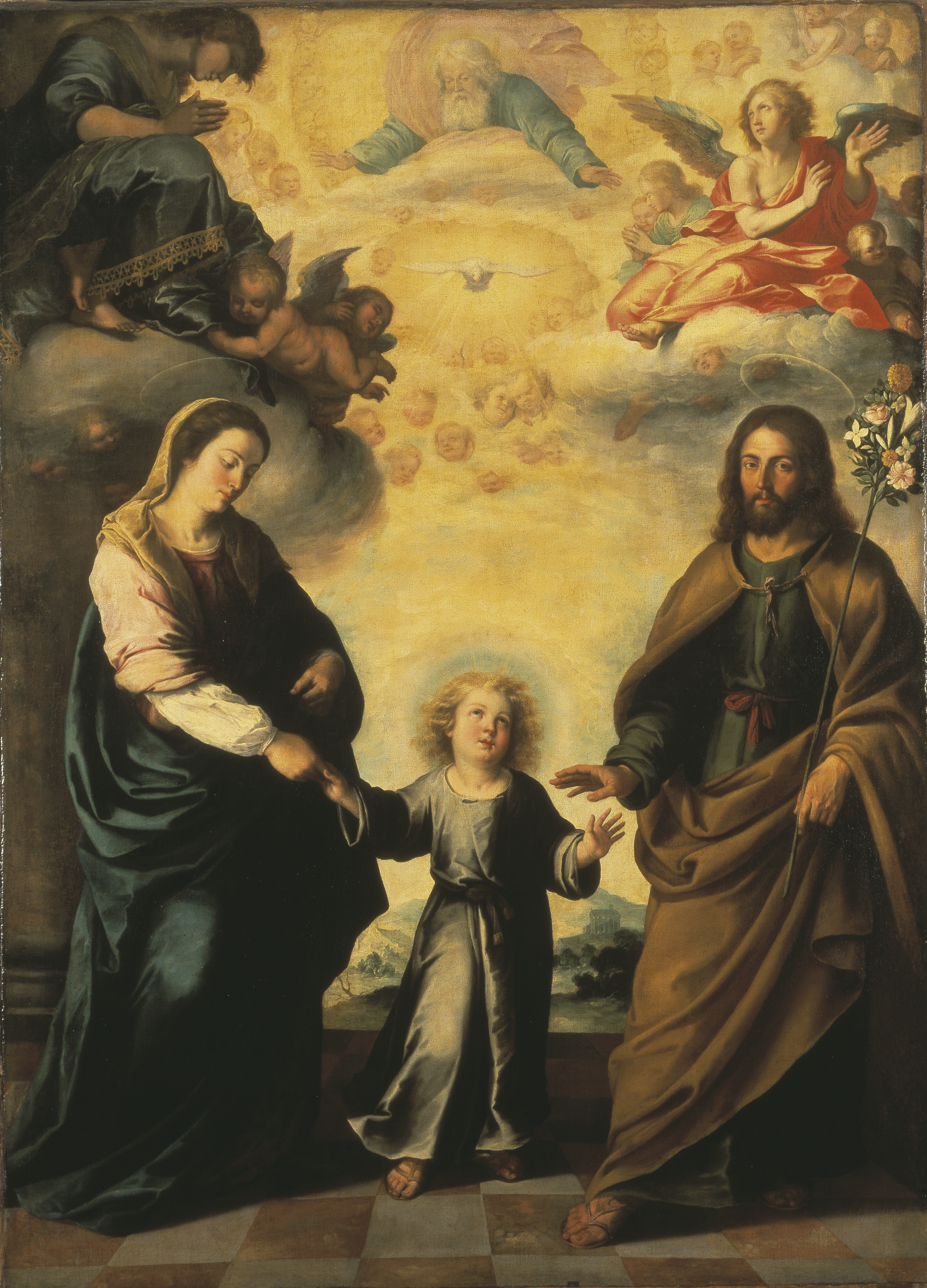
The Return of the Holy Family from Egypt, Nationalmuseum, Stockholm

The Little Fruitseller, c.1670–1675, Alte Pinakothek, Munich

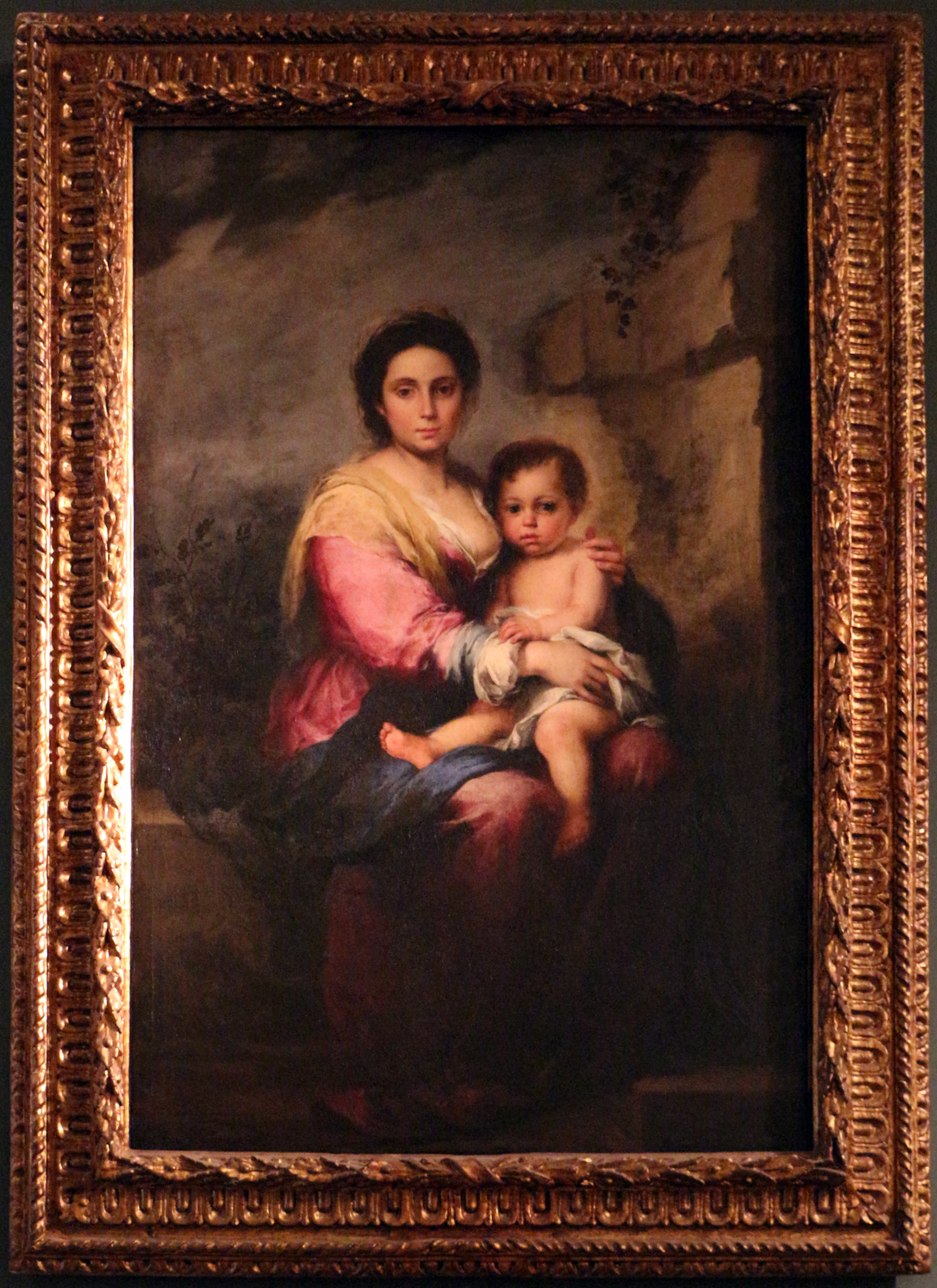
Madonna and Child (Nursing Madonna or Gypsy Madonna), c. 1675–1679, Galleria Corsini, Rome

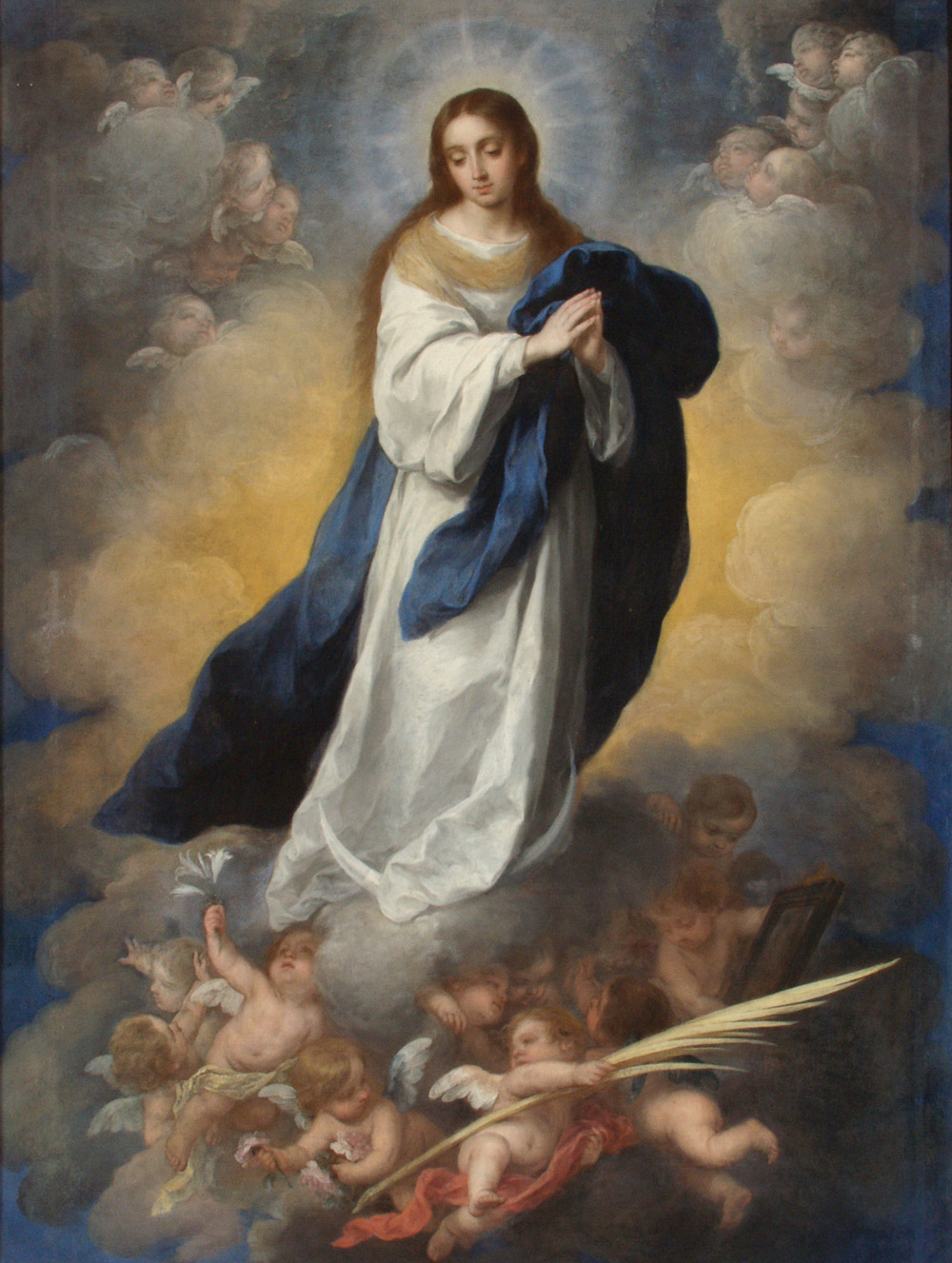
The Immaculate Conception of the Blessed Virgin Mary, 1678, Museo de Arte de Ponce

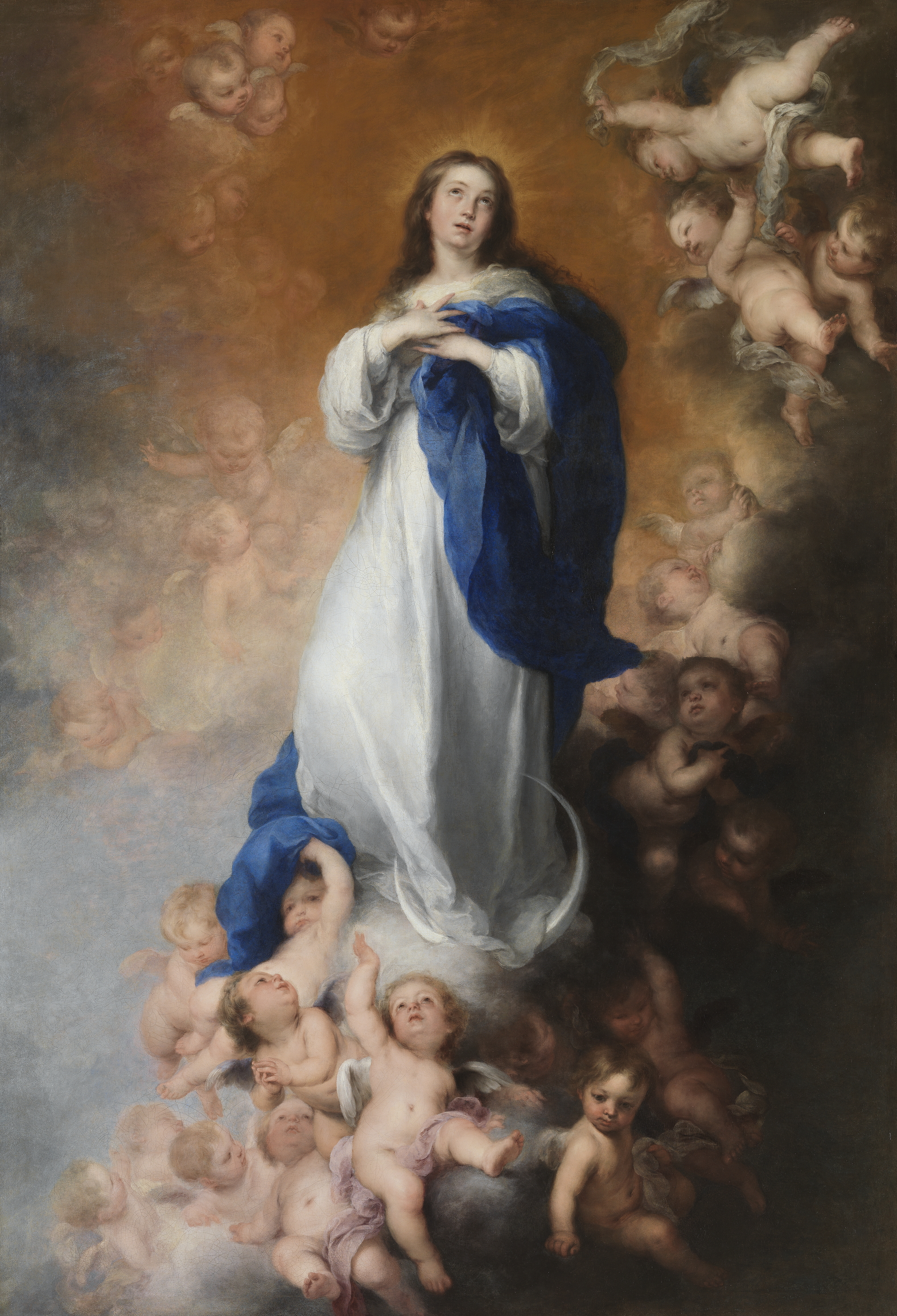
The Immaculate Conception of Los Venerables, 1678, Museo del Prado

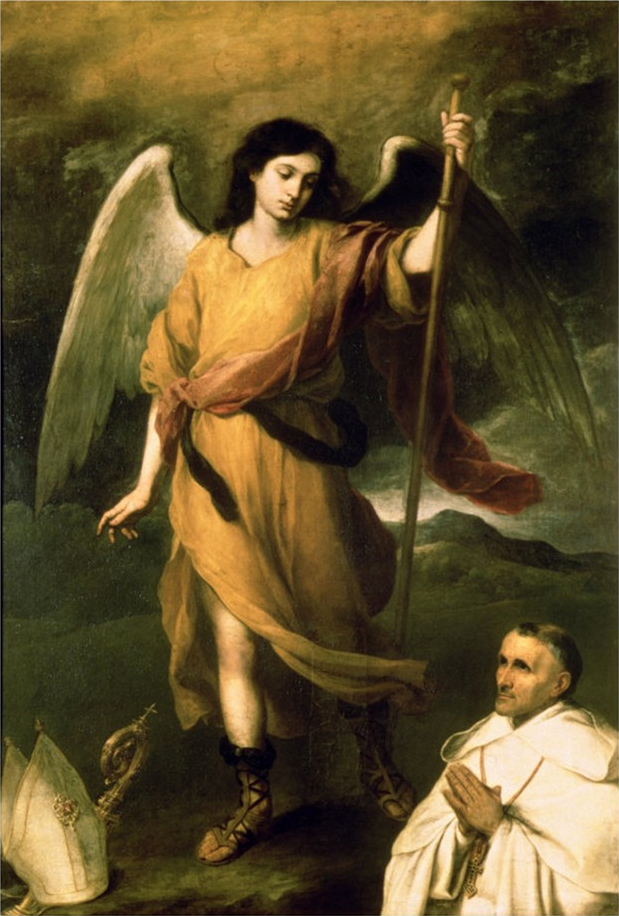
St. Raphael the Archangel with Bishop Domonte, c. 1680, Pushkin Museum, Moscow

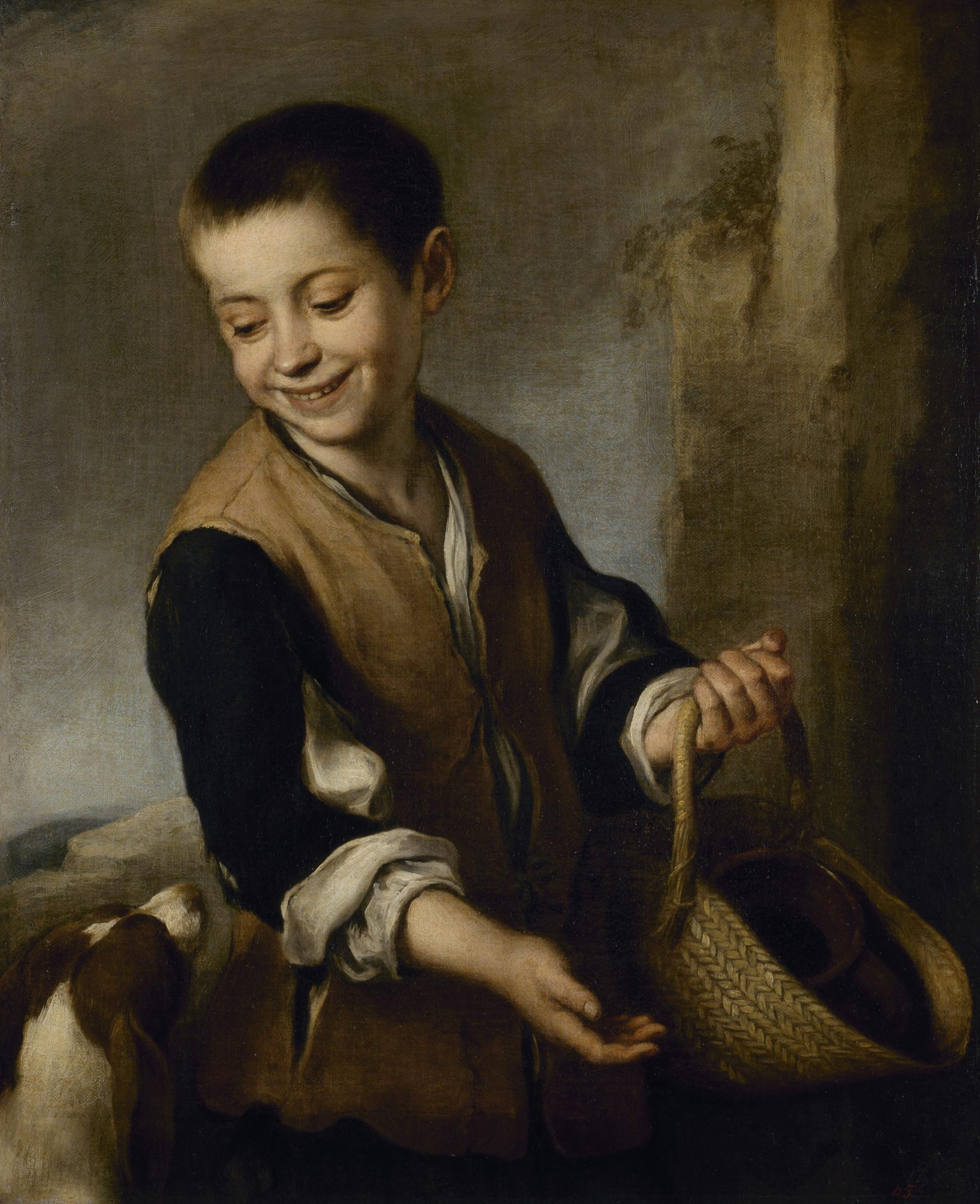
Boy with a Dog, (1655-1660), Hermitage Museum, Saint Petersburg
