= Miss Bentham =

Painting by George Bellows

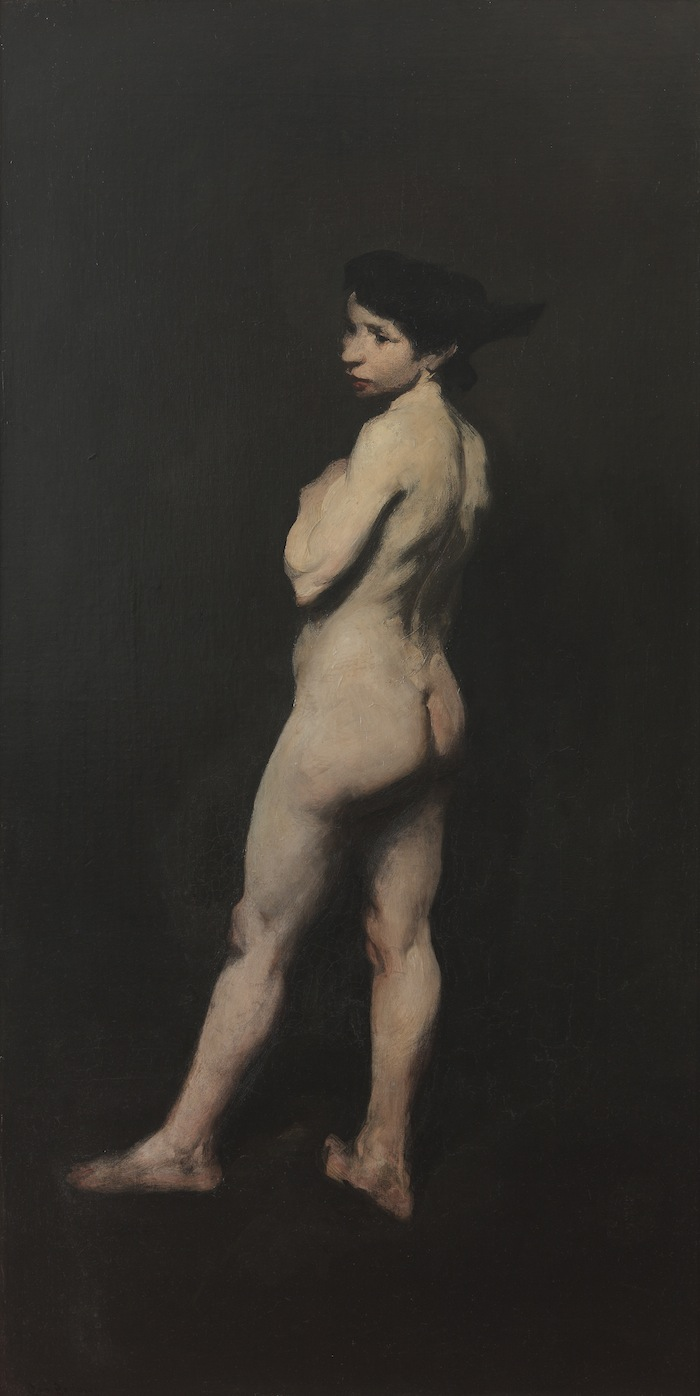
- Artist: George Bellows
- Year: 1906
- Medium: Oil on canvas
- Dimensions: 182 cm × 91 cm (72 in × 36 in)
- Location: Barber Institute of Fine Arts; Birmingham
- Owner: Barber Institute

Miss Bentham is a 1906 oil painting by the American artist George Bellows, depicting a full length, standing, nude woman, from the rear. In 2015, it was acquired by the Barber Institute of Fine Arts in Birmingham, England.

== History ==
Bellows made the painting, his first nude, in 1906 and never sold it. It was still in his studio at the time of his death and was sold by his widow in 1985, to Andy Warhol. After Warhol's death in 1987, it was sold to an anonymous private collector who in turn sold it in 2015, through the dealer Collisart, to the Barber Institute. They placed it on display shortly afterwards.

The painting is the Barber's first American painting, and only the second of Bellows' works to enter a public collection in the United Kingdom.

Hugh Carslake, Chairman of the Henry Barber Trust, which purchased the picture on behalf of the Institute, said:

This is a very exciting acquisition for the Barber collection. Our founder, Lady Barber, stated that the quality of the works in our collection should be "of exceptional and outstanding merit" and emulate that of the works in the National Gallery and the Wallace Collection, so this is a particularly apposite addition.

== See also ==
- List of works by George Wesley Bellows
