= Barber baronets =

Baronetcy in the Baronetage of the United Kingdom

There have been two baronetcies created for persons with the surname Barber, both in the Baronetage of the United Kingdom. One creation is extinct while one is still extant.

The Barber Baronetcy, of Culham Court in the County of Berkshire, was created in the Baronetage of the United Kingdom on 29 February 1924 for the property developer and solicitor William Barber. The title became extinct on his death in 1927.

The Barber Baronetcy, of Greasley in the County of Nottingham, was created in the Baronetage of the United Kingdom on 25 July 1960 for Philip Barber. He served on the Nottinghamshire County Council as a councillor from 1898 to 1925, as an Alderman from 1925 to 1961 and as its chairman from 1931 to 1945. Also he was chairman of the colliery firm, Barber, Walker and Co., Ltd. from 1896 until the coal mining industry in Great Britain was nationalised in 1947. As of 2012 the title is held by his grandson, the third Baronet, who succeeded his father in 1995.

== Barber baronets, of Culham Court (1924) ==
- Sir (William) Henry Barber, 1st Baronet (1860–1927)

== Barber baronets, of Greasley (1960) ==
- Sir (Thomas) Philip Barber, 1st Baronet (1876–1961)
- Sir William Francis Barber, 2nd Baronet (1905–1995)
- Sir (Thomas) David Barber, 3rd Baronet (born 1937)

The heir apparent is the present holder's son Thomas Edward Barber (born 1973).

Coat of arms of Barber baronets
Arms of Barber of Greasley	Crest In front of two swords in saltire points upward Proper hilts and pomels Or a bull's head erased also Proper. Escutcheon Ermine two chevronels between three fleur de lys Gules a bordure embattled also Gules. Motto In Deo Spes
