= The Marriage Feast at Cana (Murillo) =

Painting by Murillo

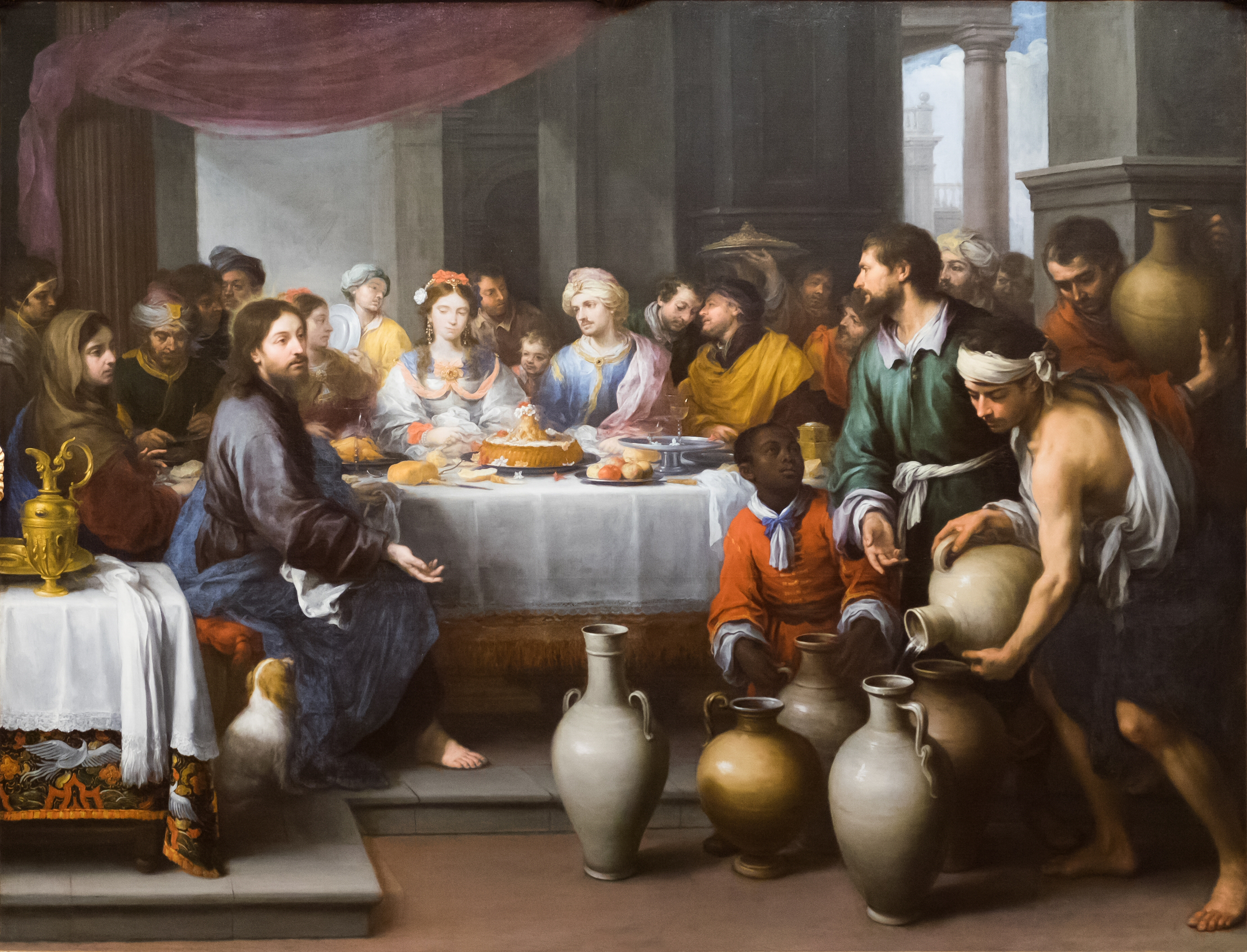
- Artist: Bartolomé Esteban Murillo
- Year: About 1672
- Medium: Oil on Canvas
- Dimensions: 179 x 235 cm
- Location: Barber Institute of Fine Arts

The Marriage Feast at Cana is a painting by Bartolomé Esteban Murillo. The painting depicts the Marriage at Cana as Christ performs the miracle of turning Water Into Wine. Murillo has seemingly painted the scene as if it is taking place in his own city of Seville.

== History ==
The painting was made around 1672 in Seville and was commissioned by Nicolas Omazur. presumably to mark his marriage with Isabel Malcampo. The paintings first recorded Location was in 1737 where it was recorded in the collection of Jean de Julienne, then at his estate sale in 1767 and was presumably sold to Guillaume Thomas François Raynal 1769, it was recorded at the estate sale of Guillaume Thomas François Raynal, then it was sold at the Prince de Conti sale in 1779 and was purchased for Aranc de Presle. The painting was then recorded in the estate sale of Aranc de Presle in 1792 and then the estate sale of François-Antoine Robit in 1801. Then at an unknown date between 1801 and 1821, it was sold to George Hibbert by Michael Bryan. In 1829, it was sold at George Hibbert's estate sale to the Marquess of Aylesbury and stayed wifh the family until 1947 where it was purchased by the Barber Institute of Fine Arts for £3,500.
