= Barber Institute of Fine Arts =

Art gallery and concert hall in Birmingham, England

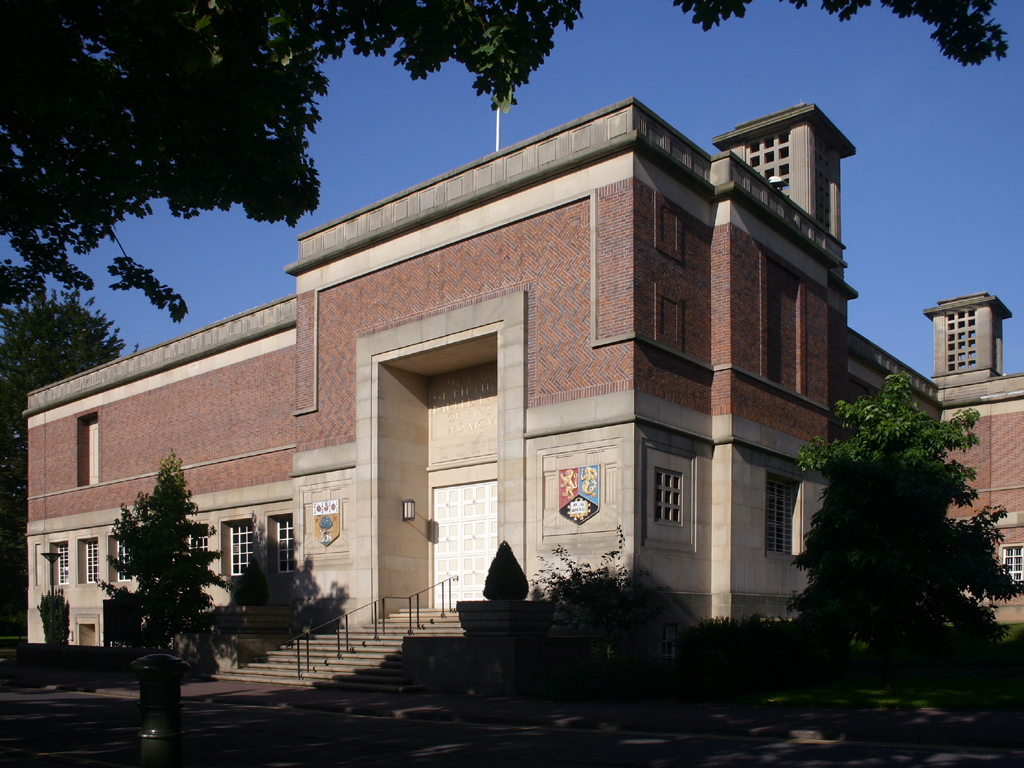
- Established: 1932; 94 years ago
- Location: University of Birmingham; Edgbaston, Birmingham; B15, United Kingdom
- Coordinates: 52°27′1.51″N 1°55′39.82″W
- Director: Professor Jennifer Powell
- Public transit access: University (Birmingham)
- Website: www.barber.org.uk

The Barber Institute of Fine Arts is an art gallery and concert hall in Birmingham, England. It is situated in purpose-built premises on the campus of the University of Birmingham.

The Grade I listed Art Deco building was designed by Robert Atkinson in the 1930s and opened in 1939 by Queen Mary. The first building to be purpose-built for the study of art history in the United Kingdom, it was described by architectural historian Sir John Summerson as representing "better than almost any other building (except, perhaps the RIBA in Portland Place) the spirit of English architecture in the 1930s." The layout of the museum is centred on a central concert hall which is surrounded by lecture halls, offices and libraries on the ground floor and art galleries on the first floor.

The heraldic shields of the University of Birmingham and the Barber family are afixed to the exterior of the building. The shields were created by the artist Gordon Herickx and produced between 1936-37 through the medium of painted and gilded Darley Dale stone.

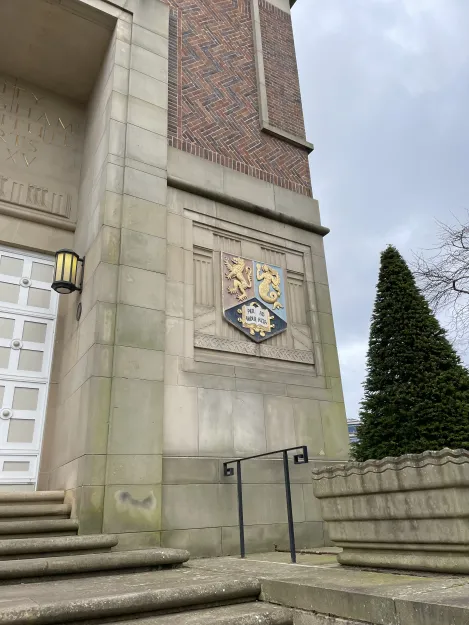
The Shield of the University of Birmingham on outside of the Barber Institute of Fine arts

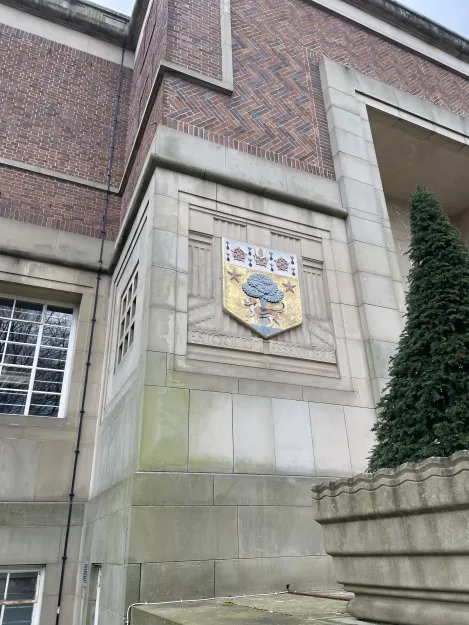
The Shield of the Barber Family on the outside of the Barber Institute of Fine arts

In the 2005 Penguin Books publication Britain's Best Museums and Galleries, the Barber Institute was one of only five galleries outside London to receive five stars for having "Outstanding collections of international significance" (the others were the National Gallery of Scotland, Oxford University's Ashmolean Museum, Cambridge University's Fitzwilliam Museum and the Walker Art Gallery, Liverpool).

== Location and history ==
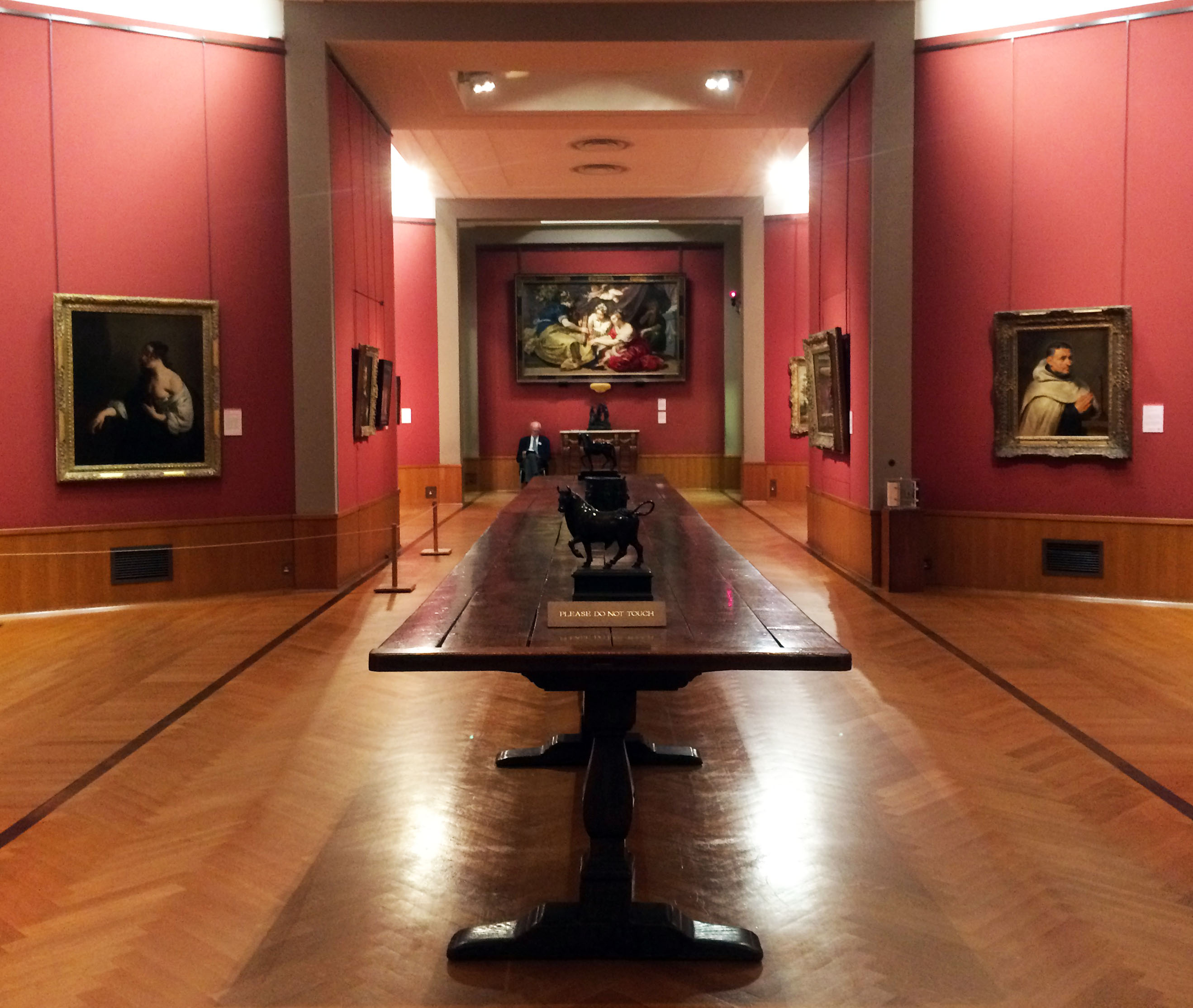
Interior of the gallery

The institute is located 5 km southwest of the city centre at the East Gate of the university campus and has one of the outstanding collections of art assembled in Britain in the 20th century, including works by Gwen John, André Derain, Fernand Léger, René Magritte and Egon Schiele. It was set up by Martha Constance Hattie Barber in memory of her husband William Henry Barber, a wealthy property developer who made his fortune expanding Birmingham's suburbs. Lady Barber was a descendant of the old Worcestershire Onions family of bellows-makers and was an heiress in her own right. By his mid-thirties, the couple had retired but their connections with the city remained strong. In 1924, Henry Barber received a baronetcy for 'Political Services to Birmingham'.

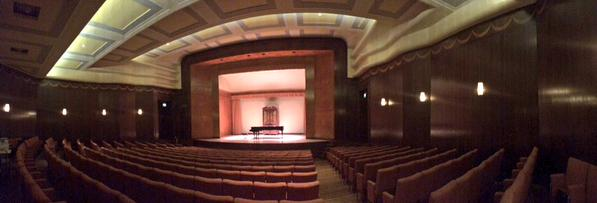
The Barber Concert Hall

He died three years later. Lady Barber decided to make a permanent contribution to the city in his memory. On 13 December 1932, the Barber Institute of Fine Arts was founded, and was bequeathed to the university 'for the study and encouragement of art and music'. Lady Barber died four months later leaving all of her assets to the trustees of the institute. This money was used to acquire works of art for a collection and fund the construction of a new building. In order to ensure that only artworks of the highest quality were bought for the Barber Institute, its founding trust deed stipulated that all purchases should be 'of that standard of quality as required by the National Gallery and the Wallace Collection'.

The founding director (from 1935 to 1952) was Thomas Bodkin, who acquired the nucleus of the collection described by The Observer as "the last great art collection of the twentieth century". Bodkin's successor was Professor Ellis Waterhouse who served from 1952 to 1970. The current director of the Barber is Professor Jennifer Powell who took up the role on 9 January 2023.

The building was Grade II listed in 1981 and uprated to Grade I by Historic England in September 2020. The foyer floor, door surrounds and staircase are of travertine marble. The auditorium is panelled in Australian walnut.

On 2 October 2023, the institute temporarily closed for refurbishment; it reopened on 22 June 2024, before closing again for a second phase of refurbishments from 26 January 2025. In 2026, the institute raised 14.3 million pounds for a third phase of refurbishments.

== Collections ==
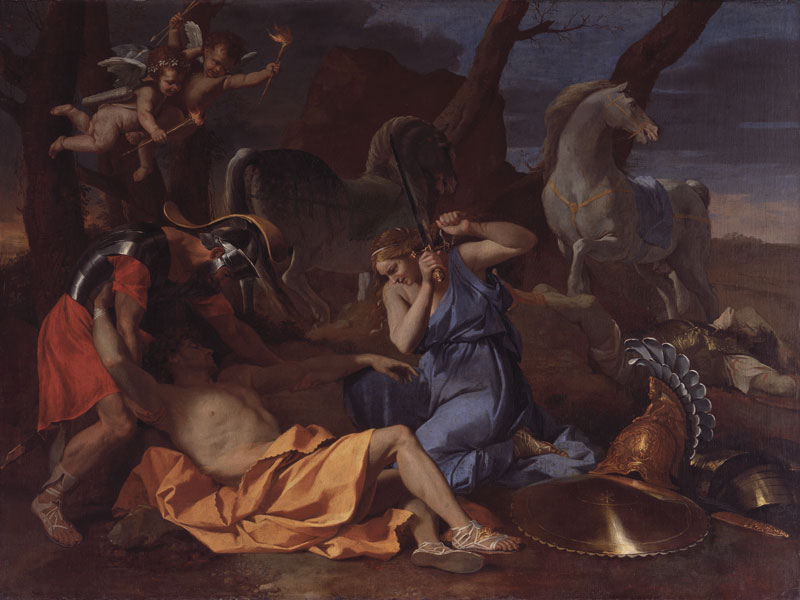
Nicolas Poussin, Tancred and Erminia (c.1634), oil on canvas

The collection is full of famous works by artists such as Vincent van Gogh, Claude Monet, Auguste Rodin, J. M. W. Turner and Rubens, displayed in spacious and elegant galleries on the first floor of the institute. The Renaissance is represented by masterpieces by Sandro Botticelli, Giovanni Bellini, Veronese and Simone Martini (e.g. his St John the Evangelist of 1320), the 17th century by artists including Rubens, Van Dyck, Poussin and Murillo.

The collections of French Impressionism and Post-Impressionism include artworks by Degas, Monet, Renoir, Van Gogh and Gauguin. Among the British artists represented are Aubrey Beardsley, Gainsborough, Reynolds, Rossetti, Whistler and Turner. There is also a fine collection of sculpture (including works by Rodin and Degas), Old Master prints and drawings, portrait miniatures and objets d'art. Standing at the entrance is the Equestrian Statue of George I, the oldest public sculpture in Birmingham. In 2013 the gallery acquired an important and commanding late work by Sir Joshua Reynolds: Maria Marow Gideon (1767–1834) and her Brother William (1775–1805), and in 2015 acquired George Bellows' Miss Bentham (1906), its first American painting, and only the second of Bellows' paintings to enter a public collection in the United Kingdom.

The institute also has one of the world's largest coin collections, especially of Roman and Byzantine coins. This outstanding collection was supplemented in 1967 with 15,000 coins, from Phillip Whitting and Geoffrey Haines. Many concerts take place at the Barber throughout the year, as well as a music festival which is held in June.

860 items of the Shaw-Hellier collection are held at the Barber's music library.

== Major works ==
=== Paintings ===
- The Harvest Wagon, Thomas Gainsborough
- Symphony in White, No. 3, James McNeill Whistler
- Portrait of François Langlois, Anthony Van Dyck
- The Marriage Feast at Cana, Bartolomé Esteban Murillo

=== Drawings ===
- A Man with an Oar, Albrecht Dürer
- A Sheet ot Studies, Rembrandt van Rijn

== Gallery ==
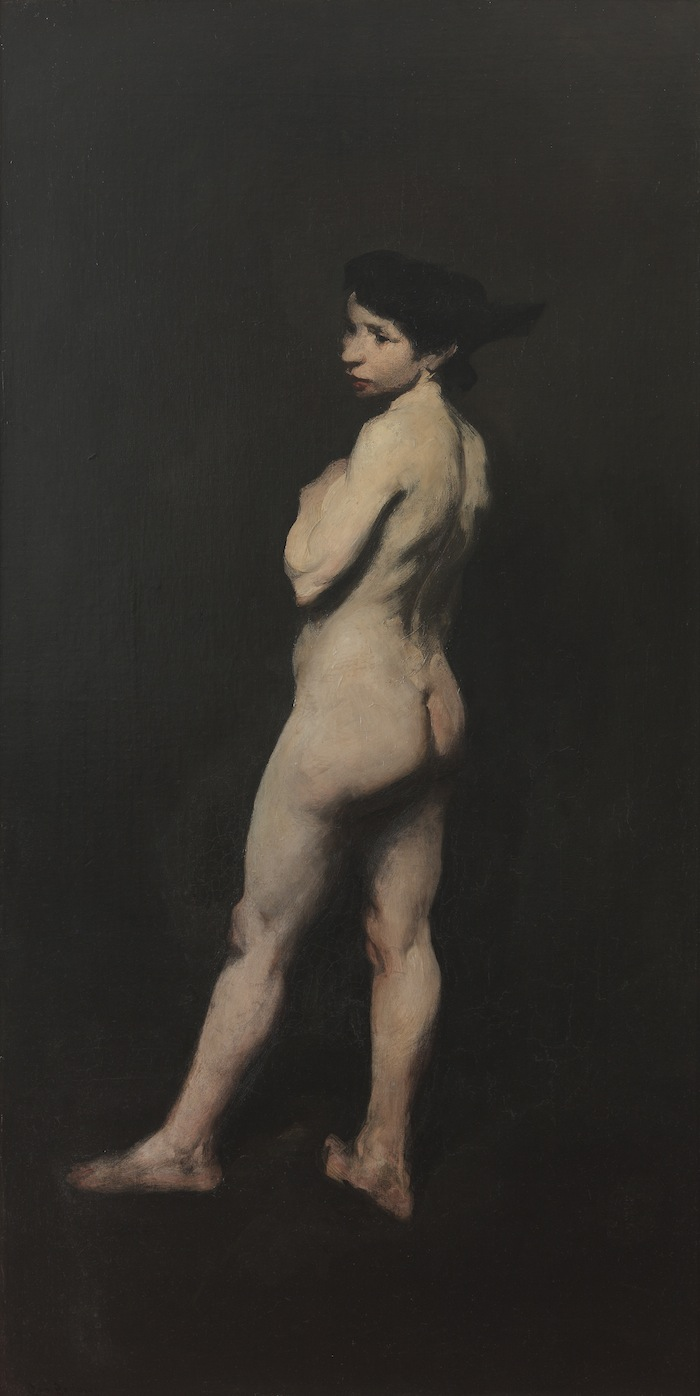
Miss Bentham (George Bellows, 1906)

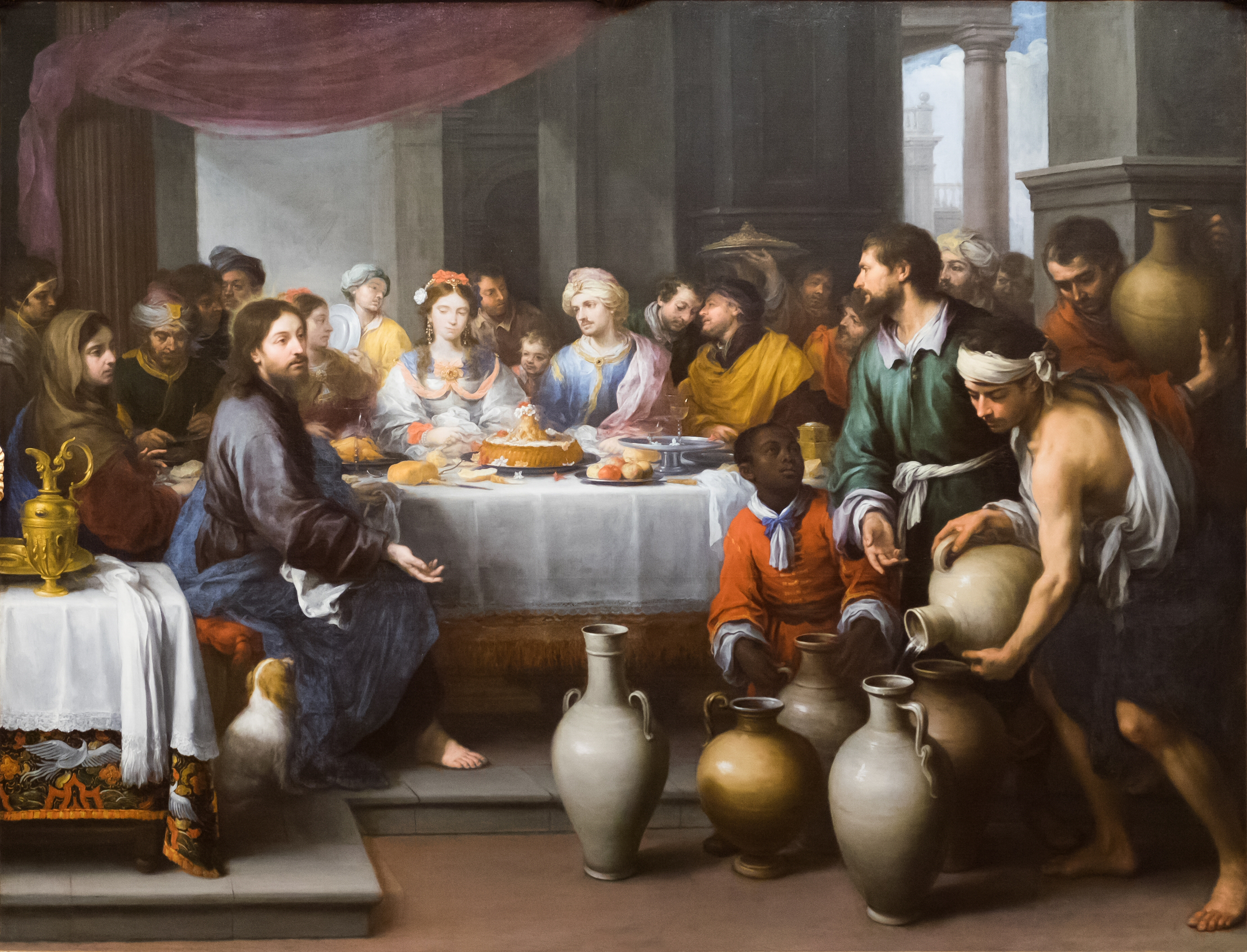
The Marriage Feast at Cana (Bartolomé Esteban Murillo, c. 1672)

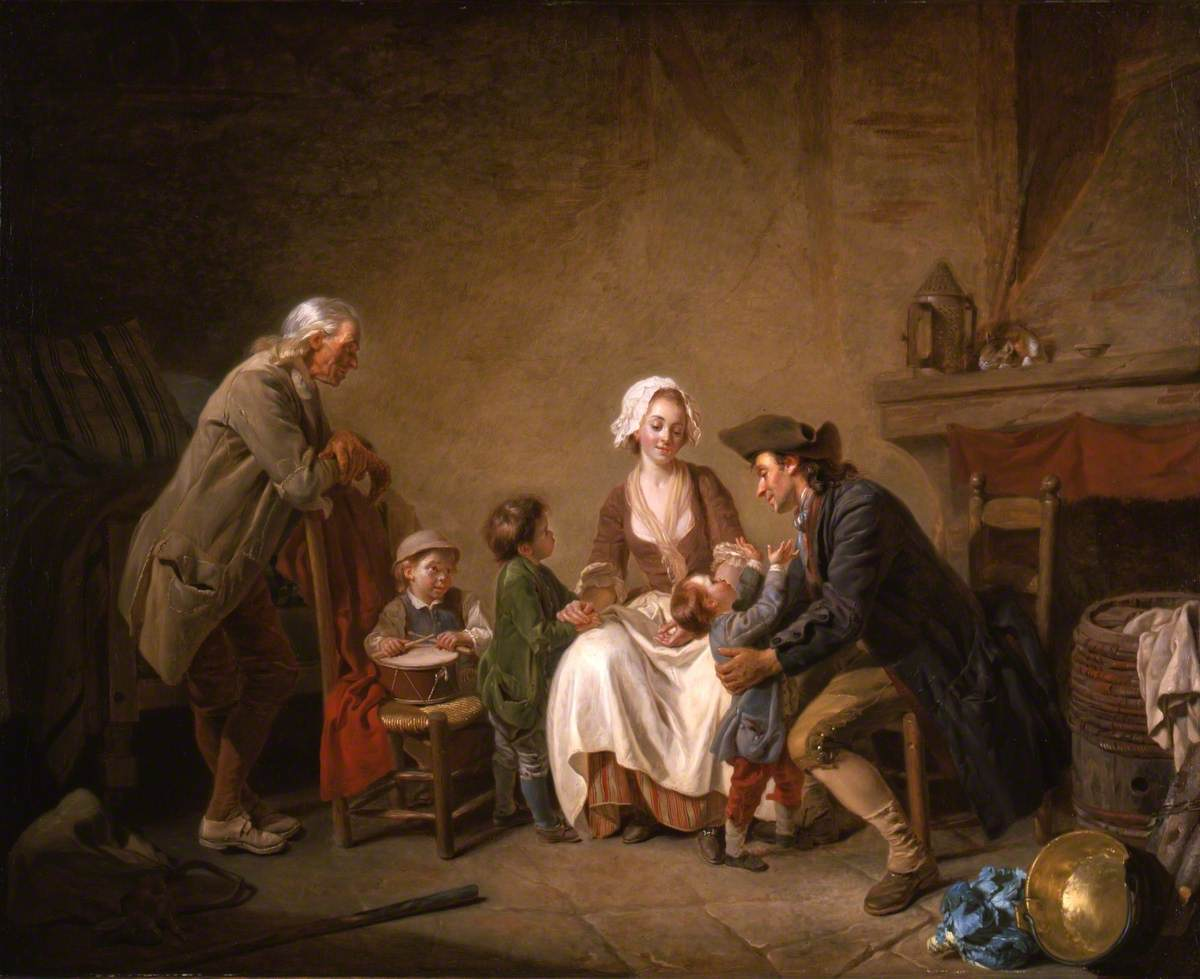
Paternal Love by Étienne Aubry, 1775

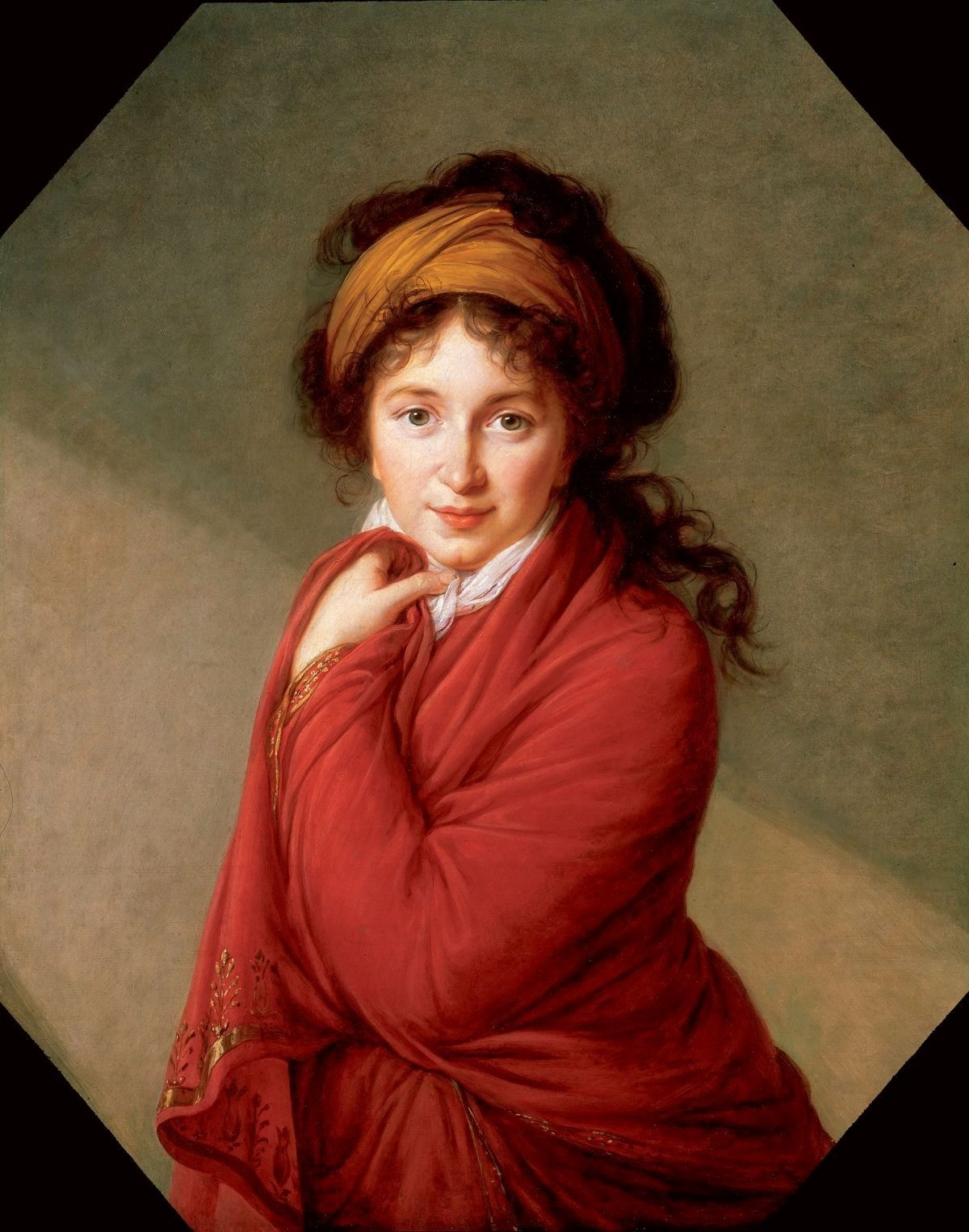
Portrait of Countess Golovina (Elisabeth Vigée-Lebrun, c.1800)

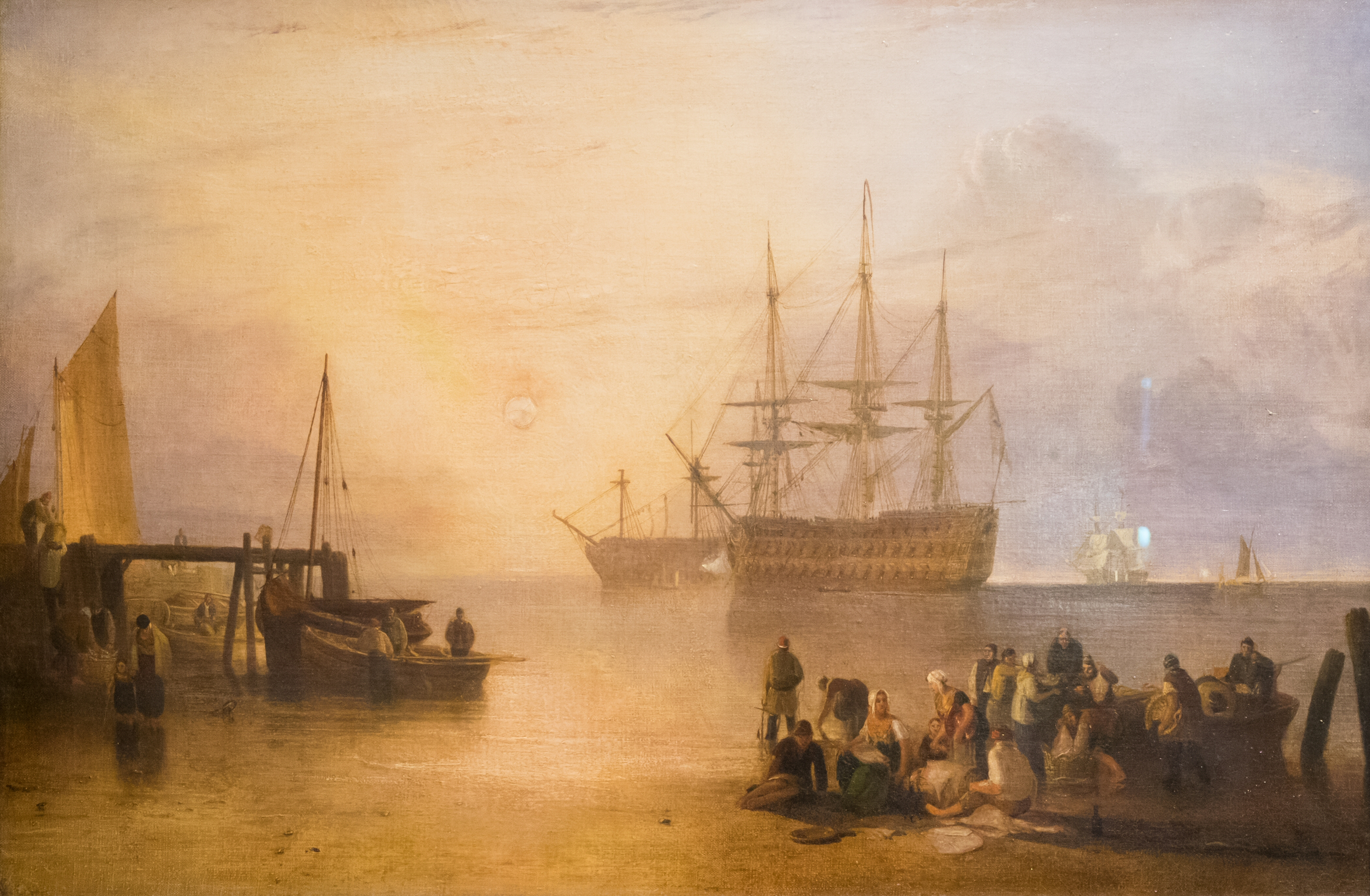
The Sun Setting through Vapour (Joseph Mallord William Turner), c. 1809

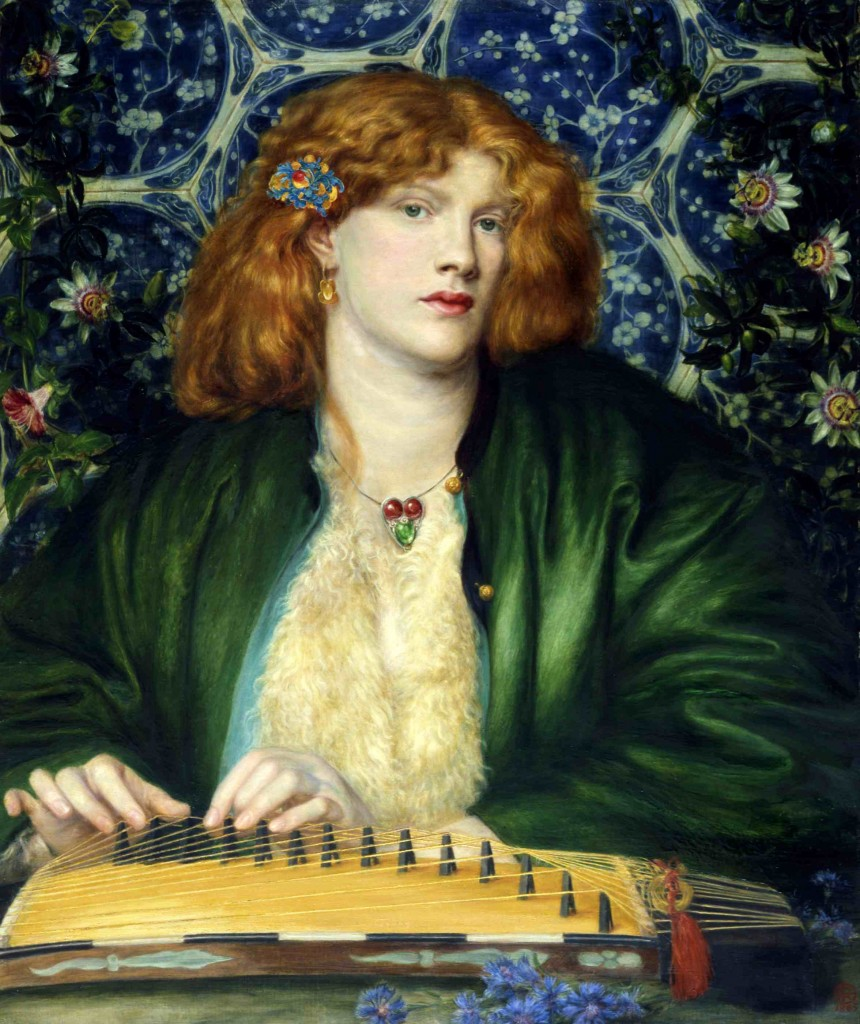
The Blue Bower (Dante Gabriel Rossetti, 1865)

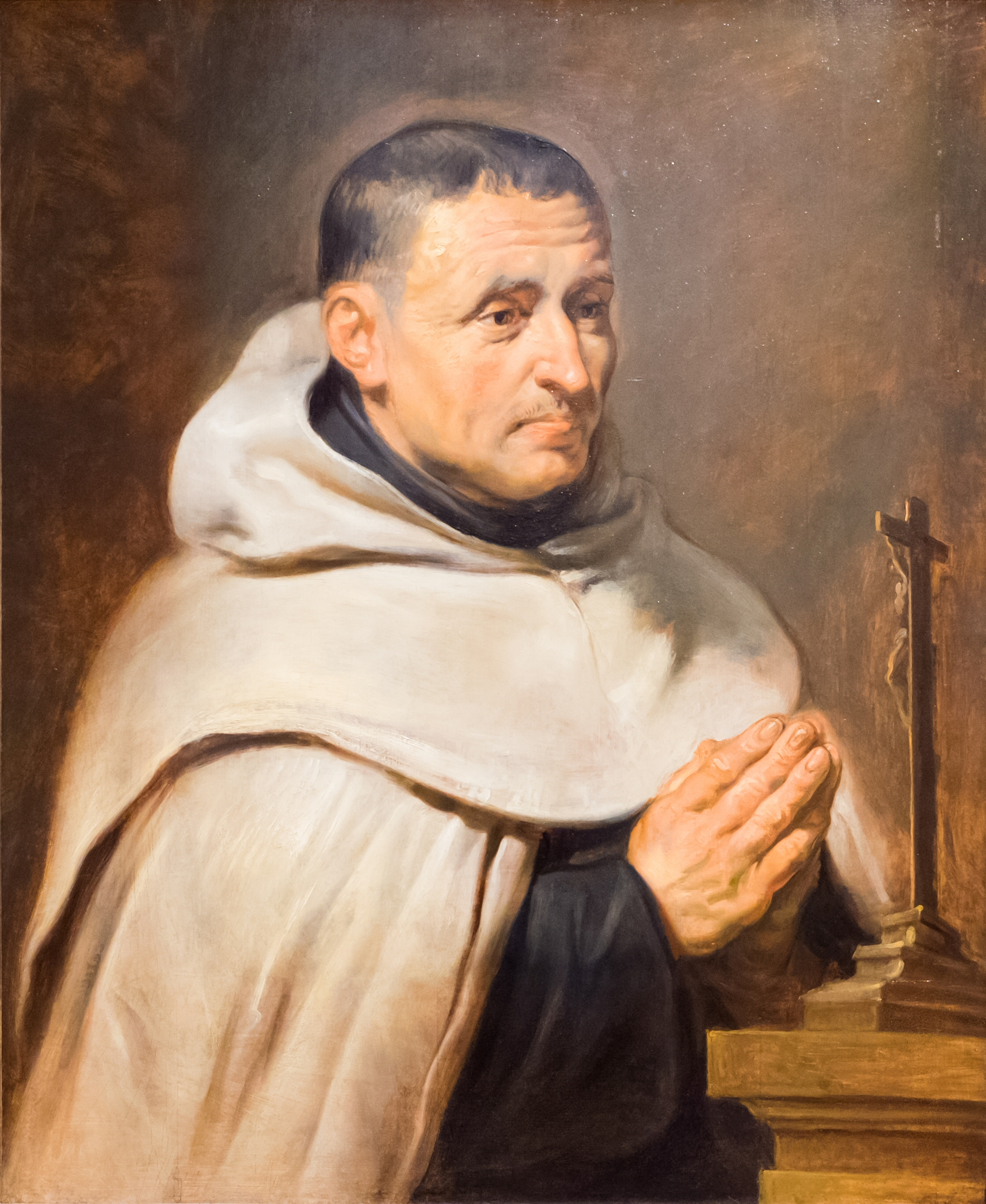
Portrait of a Carmelite Prior (Peter Paul Rubens), c. 1616

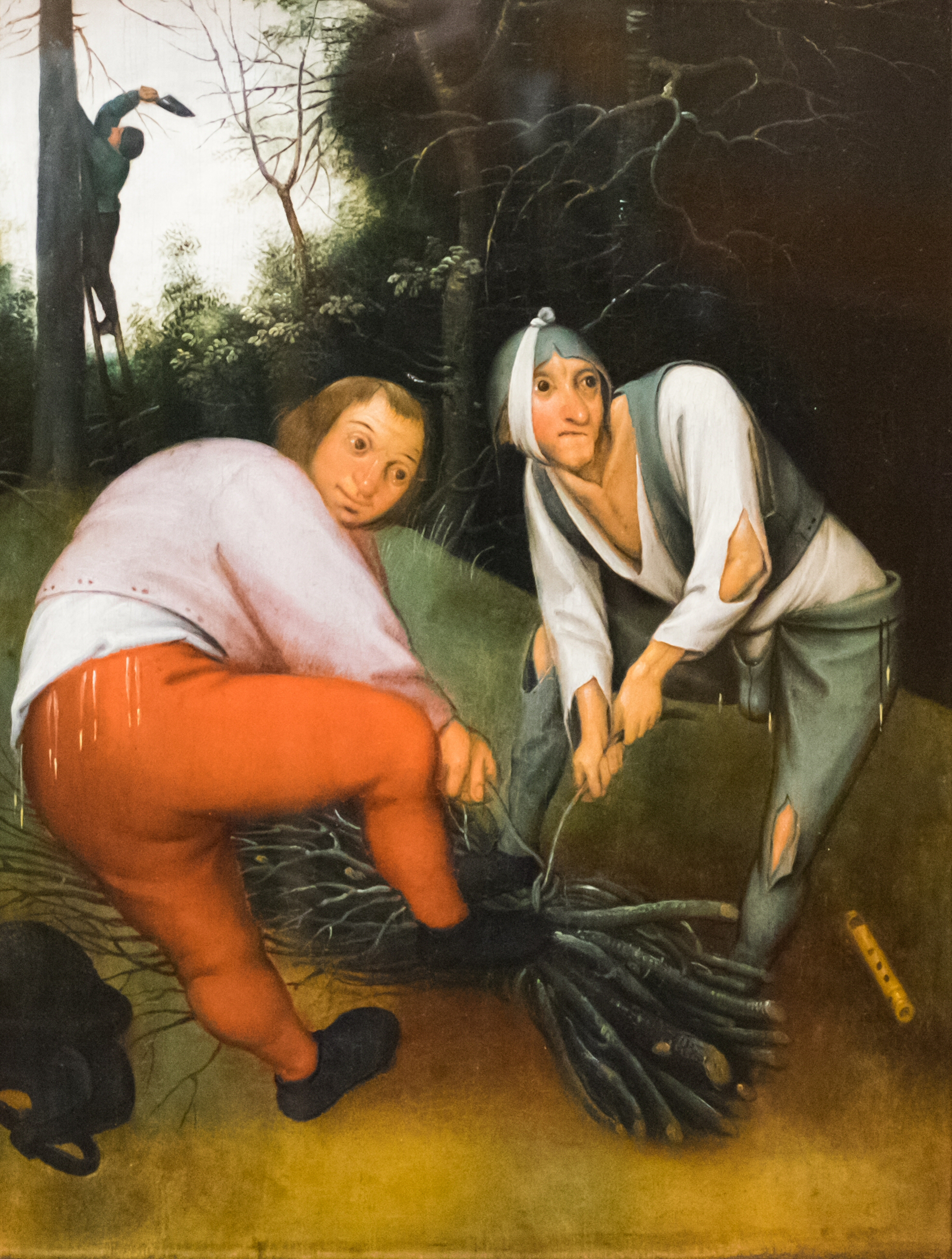
Two Peasants Binding Faggots (Pieter Brueghel the Younger), c. 1620
