= François L'Anglois =

French painter

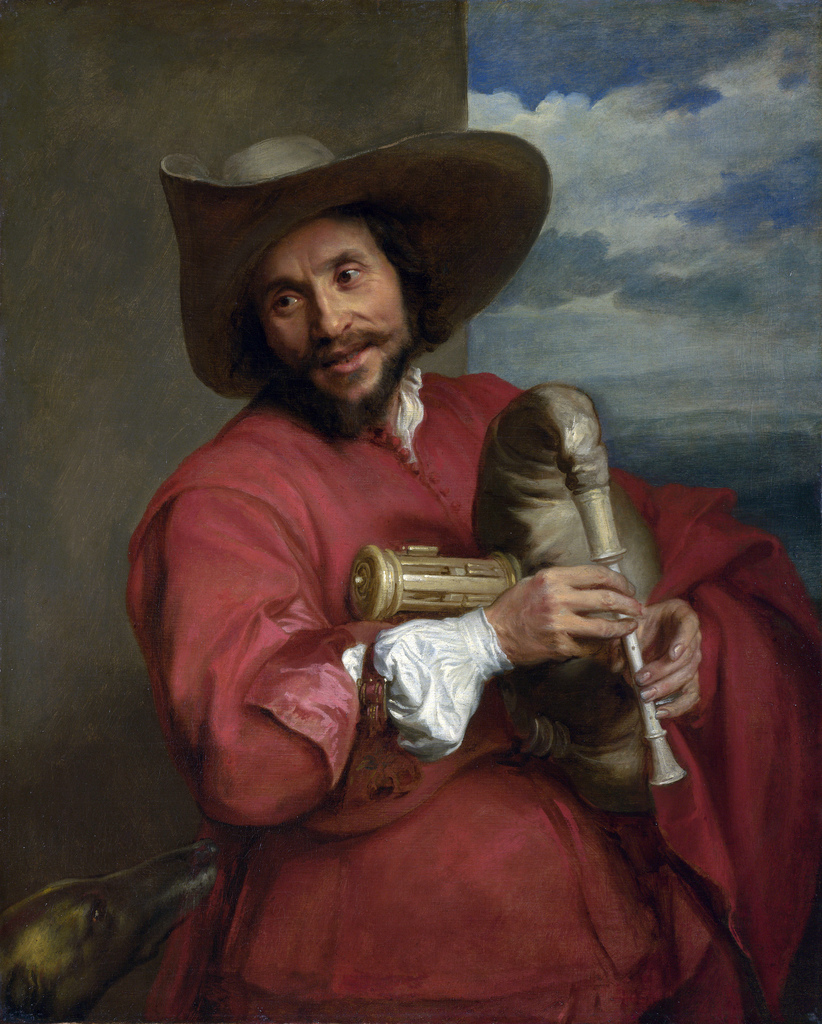
Portrait of François Langlois in the 1630s by Anthony van Dyck

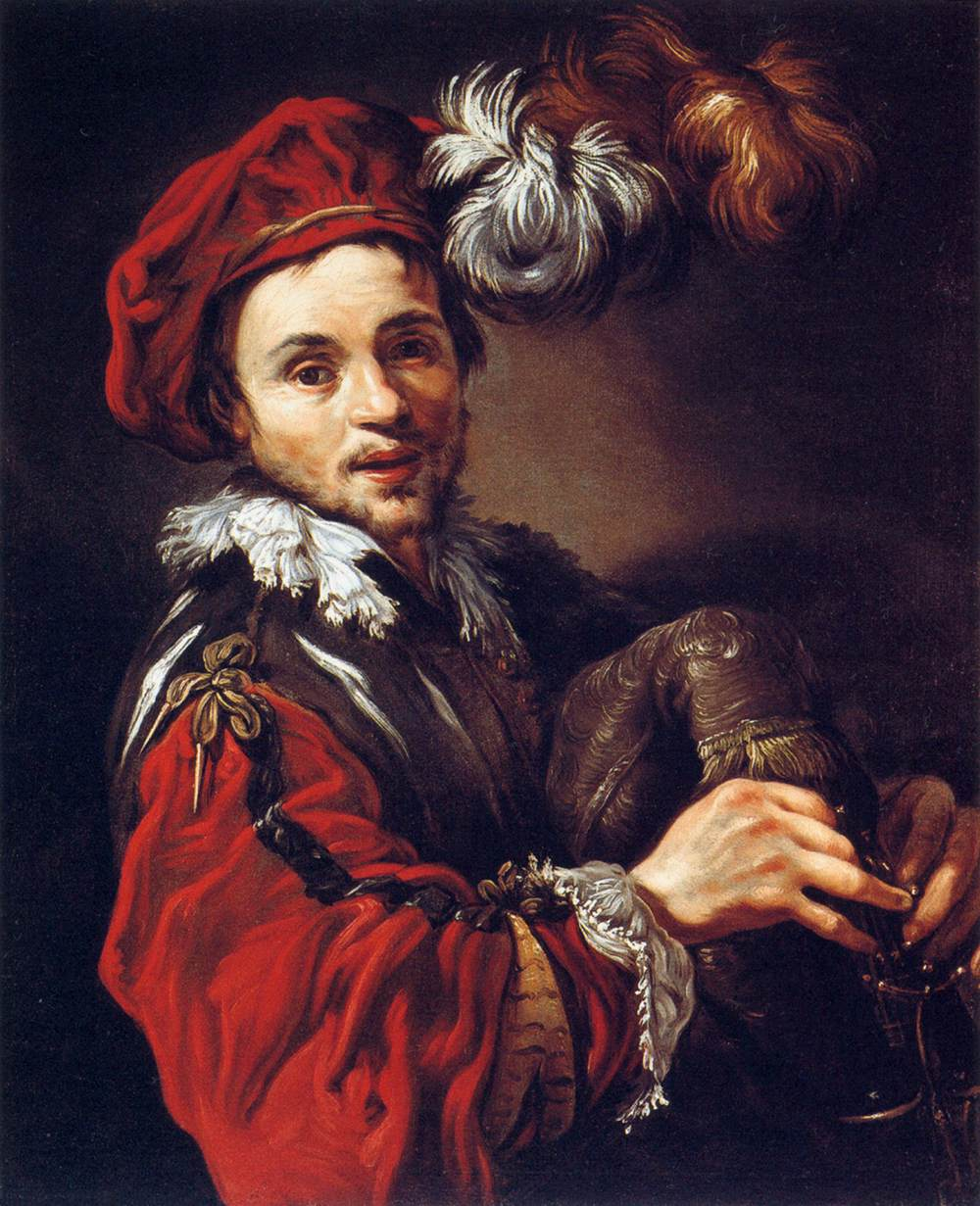
François L’Anglois (c. 1621) by Claude Vignon

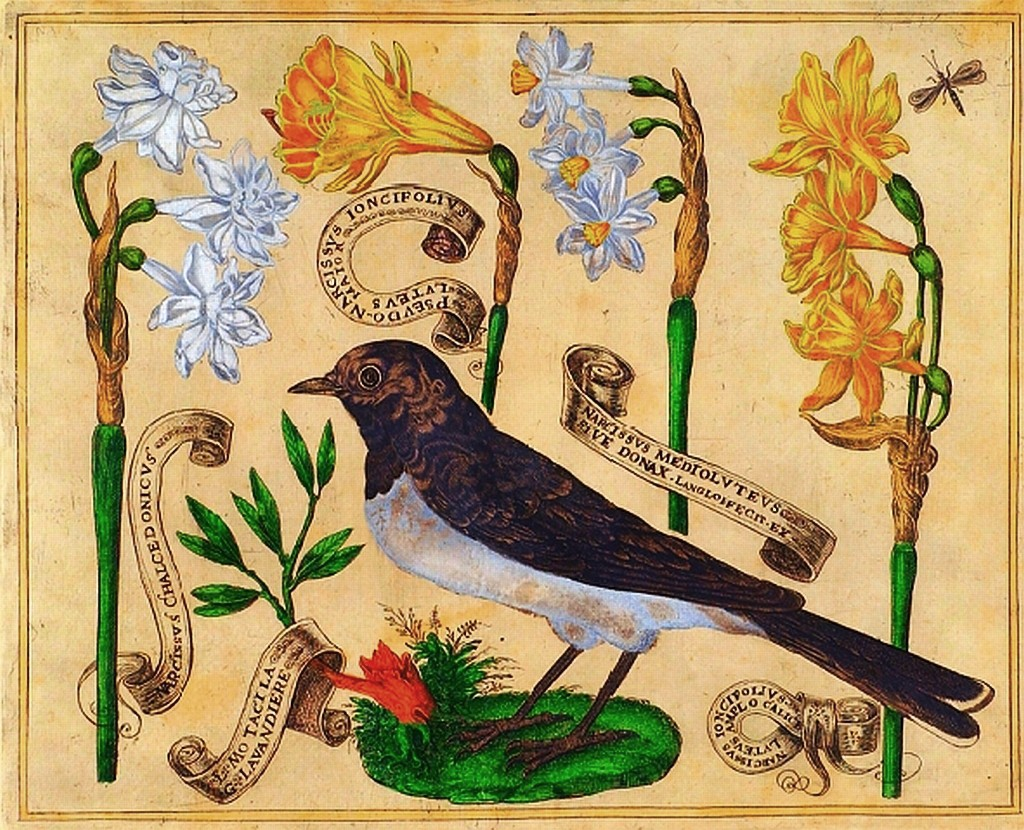
Plate from Livre de Fleurs

François L’Anglois or Langlois (French pronunciation: [fʁɑ̃swa lɑ̃ɡlwa]; 12 May 1589 (baptised) – 13 January 1647), also called F. L. D. Ciartres ("François Langlois from Chartres"), was a French print publisher, print seller, engraver, bookseller, art dealer, and painter. He is widely considered to have been the first important print publisher in France and to have contributed significantly to spreading awareness of contemporary artists' work throughout Europe.

== Life and career ==
François L’Anglois was born in Chartres and baptised there on 12 May 1589. He visited Italy on several occasions: Rome in 1613 and 1614 and Genoa, Florence, and Rome again in 1621. On these trips he met Anthony van Dyck and Claude Vignon, who both painted his portrait. He also became acquainted with the engravers Stefano della Bella and François Collignon. It was probably around this time that he acquired the nickname of Chartres (Ciartres in Italian). In 1624–1625 he was associated with Vignon as an art dealer (paintings) and acted as a print collector for Thomas Howard, 14th Earl of Arundel, and Charles I of England.

He is also known for his 1620 book Livre de Fleurs, a compendium of garden flowers, birds and insects. He designed the title page for Livre de Fleurs and had the botanical plates engraved by the German, Léonard Gaultier (1561–1641), also resident in Paris, Claude Savary, and Barthélémy Gaultier, the editor being Jean Le Clerc. The remaining plates were drawn and engraved by L’Anglois.

In 1629, on his way to Italy, he collaborated with Matthieu Fredeau, a painter from Antwerp, on the Rosary altarpiece of the Dominican church of Aix-en-Province. About this time he began his career as a print publisher, producing illustrated books in collaboration with Melchior Tavernier, and becoming a master in the bookseller's guild on 26 October 1634. He set up his own business at the sign of the 'Colonnes d'Hercule' on the rue Saint-Jacques, Paris, shortly before his marriage to Madeleine de Collemont in 1637.

L’Anglois also published Pierre de Sainte-Marie Magdeleine's Traitté d'horlogiographie in 1645, a treatise on timekeeping, methods for determining the time both by day and by night, the timing of tides, how to cut geometrically regular shapes from stone or wood, and all aspects of measurement and projection. Nicolas Langlois (1640–1703), the son of François, published another edition of the book in 1657 in Paris.

François L'Anglois died in Paris on 13 January 1647.

== Some selected works published by François L’Anglois ==
- Livre des fleurs (1620)
- R. P. Ioannis Francisci Niceronis Parisini, ex Ord. Minim. Thaumaturgus opticus, seu Admiranda Optices, per radium directum: Catoptrices, per reflexum e politis corporibus, planis, cylindricis, conicis, polyedris, polygonis & aliis: Dioptrices, per refractum in diaphanis. ... Opus curiosum & utile Pictoribus, Architectis, Statuariis, Sculptoribus, Caelatoribus, & quibuscumque aliis, quorum opera in delineandi studio posita est. Pars prima De iis quae spectant ad visionem directam. Ad emin[entissi]mum cardinalem Mazarinum by Jean François Nicéron (1646) in Latin and held by 5 libraries worldwide
- Le Livre Original de la Portraiture pour la Jeunesse tiré de F. Bologne et autres bons peintres. L. Ferdinand fecit
- La perspective speculative, et pratique. Ou sont demonstrez les fondemens de cet art, & de tout ce qui en a esté enseigné jusqu'à present. Ensemble la maniere universelle de la pratiquer, non seulement sans plan geometral, & sans tiers poinct, dedans ni dehors le champ du tableau. Mais encores par le moyen de la ligne, communément appellée horizontale. De l'invention du feu sieur Aleaume, ingenieur du roy. Mise au jour par Estienne Migon, professeur és mathematiques by Jacques Aleaume
- Maniere de bien bastir pour toutes sortes de personnes par Pierre Le Muet Architecte ordinaire du roy et conducteur des desseins des fortifications de la province de Picardie. Reveue, augmentée et enrichie en cette seconde édition de plusieurs figures & de beaux bastimens & edifices, de l'invention & conduitte dudit sieur Le Muet, & autres by Pierre Le Muet

== Bibliography ==
- Benezit (2006). "Langlois, François called F. L. D. Ciartres", vol. 8, p. 428, in Benezit Dictionary of Artists. Paris: Gründ. ISBN 9782700030709.
- Préaud, Maxime (1996). "Langlois, François", vol. 18, pp. 745–746, in The Dictionary of Art, 34 volumes, edited by Jane Turner. New York: Grove. ISBN 9781884446009.
