= 1924 Prime Minister's Resignation Honours =

British government recognitions

The 1924 Prime Minister's Resignation Honours were awards announced on 8 February 1924 to mark the exit of Prime Minister Stanley Baldwin, who resigned his first term as prime minister in late January.

The recipients of honours are displayed here as they were styled before their new honour, and arranged by honour, with classes (Knight, Knight Grand Cross, etc.) and then divisions (Military, Civil, etc.) as appropriate.

== Barons ==
- Sir John George Butcher Bt KC JP Member of Parliament for the City of York, 1892–1906, 1910-23. Served on many Select and other Committees of the House of Commons.

== Privy Councillor ==
The following became members of the Privy Council:

- Sir James Tynte Agg-Gardner MP Member of Parliament for Cheltenham 1874–80, 1885–95, 1900–06, and since April 1911. Chairman of House of Commons Kitchen Committee.
- Lieutenant-Colonel Wilfrid William Ashley JP DL MP Member of Parliament since 1906, for Blackpool 1906-18, for Fylde 1918–22, for New Forest and Christchurch since November 1922. Unionist Whip 1911–13. Parliamentary Secretary, Ministry of Transport, 1922–23. Under Secretary of State for War, 1923 to January, 1924
- Captain the Honourable Edward Algernon Fitzroy JP DL MP Member of Parliament for South Northamptonshire, now the Daventry Division, 1900–06 and since 1910. Deputy Chairman of Committees, House of Commons, 1922–23.
- Lieutenant-Colonel the Honourable Walter Edward Guinness DSO MP Member of Parliament for Bury St. Edmunds since August, 1907. Under Secretary of State for War, 1922–23. Financial Secretary to the Treasury, 1923 to January 1924.
- Sir Herbert Nield KC JP DL MP Member of Parliament for Ealing since 1906. Member of the Council of the National Unionist Association and Chairman, 1923–24. Chairman of the Association of Conservative Clubs. Recorder of York since 1917. Deputy Chairman, Middlesex Magistrates.

== Baronet ==
- William Henry Barber. For political services in Birmingham. A generous benefactor to the University of Birmingham.
- The Right Honourable Sir Clement Anderson Montague Barlow KBE Member of Parliament for South Salford, December, 1910–23. Minister of Labour, October 1922 to January 1924. Parliamentary Secretary to Ministry of Labour, April 1920 to October, 1922. Senior Government Delegate at the International Labour Conferences, Genoa, 1920 and Geneva, 1921 and 1922.
- Major Harry Barnston JP DL MP Member of Parliament for Eddisbury Division of Cheshire since 1910. Comptroller of His Majesty's Household, 1921 to January 1924.
- Sir Otto John Beit KCMG For services rendered to the Imperial College of Science and Technology at South Kensington.
- Lieutenant-Colonel Henry Page Croft CMG TD JP DL MP Member of Parliament for Christchurch Division, January, 1910–18, for Bournemouth since 1918.
- Sir Herbert Hambling JP For important services rendered to the Air Ministry on financial and commercial matters.
- Sir John Sutherland Harmood-Banner JP DL MP Member of Parliament for Everton Division of Liverpool since 1905.
- John Mackintosh MacLeod DL Member, of Parliament for Central Division of Glasgow, 1915–18, for Kelvingrove Division, 1918–22. Honorary Treasurer of the Western Divisional Council of the Scottish Unionist Association since 1893, and of Glasgow Conservative Club since 1895. Member of General Assembly Church of Scotland and of Committee on Union of Scottish Presbyterian Churches.
- John Denton Marsden JP For public and political services in Grimsby. Principal of the Consolidated Steam Fishing and Ice Company, Limited. A large supporter of charities in Great Grimsby and District.

== Knight ==
- Alderman Arthur Carlton CBE For valuable public services. Mayor of the City of Worcester 1916–19, 1922–23
- Charles Edward Cottier. For political and public services. Honorary Treasurer of the Empire Development Union.
- Thomas Davies MP Member of Parliament for Cirencester and Tewkesbury since 1918. County Councillor for Camden, 1899–1910. Vice-Chairman of Local Education Authority.
- Nicholas Grattan-Doyle JP DL MP Member of Parliament for Newcastle-on-Tyne North since 1918. One of the founders of the Northern Tariff Reform Federation and Honorary Secretary since its formation 1905. Deputy Director Education and Propaganda, Ministry of Food 1918.
- Gerald Fitzroy Hohler KC MP Member of Parliament for Chatham, January 1910; and for Gillingham since 1918. Called to Bar, Inner Temple 1888; Bencher 1915; Practises on South Eastern Circuit. K.C. 1906.
- George Hopwood Hume JP Member of Parliament for Greenwich 1922–23. Member of the London County Council since March 1910. Leader of Municipal Reform Party since 1918. Chairman of Highways Committee 1914–19; Chairman of Electricity Committee since 1913.
- Henry Jackson JP Mayor of Wandsworth since 1921. Chairman of the Metropolitan Boroughs Standing Joint Committee, Chairman of many local organisations such as the League of Nations Union, Red Cross, Council of Churches. Raised large sums of money for hospitals.
- William Clare Lees OBE JP For public and political services in Manchester. President of Manchester Chamber of Commerce 1922–24. Chairman Manchester Branch National Propaganda and Manchester Economic League. Appointed by H.MI. Government Deputy Commercial Adviser to British Delegation to recent International Conference on Customs formalities convened by the League of Nations (Oct. 1923.)
- Robert John Lynn MP Member of Parliament for Wood Vale, Belfast since December, 1918; for West Belfast in Ulster Parliament 1921, and for West Belfast in Imperial Parliament since November 1922. Chairman of Committee set up by Government of Northern Ireland on Education.
- John Arthur Ransome Marriott MP Member of Parliament for Oxford City, 1917–22, for York since 1923. Served on Select Committees on National Expenditure, 1917–20. Honorary Fellow, formerly Fellow and Lecturer of Worcester College. Oxford.
- Lieutenant-Colonel Joseph Nail DSO TD MP Member of Parliament for Hulme Division of Manchester since 1918. Parliamentary Private Secretary (unpaid) to the Rt. Hon. W. C. Bridgeman, August 1919 to October 1920. Director of Manchester Chamber of Commerce.
- Lieutenant-Colonel John Robert Pretyman Newman JP DL Member of Parliament for Enfield Division, 1910, for Finchley Division, 1918–23.
- Felix John Clewett Pole, General Manager of the Great Western Railway.
- John Holdsworth Robinson JP For political services in Yorkshire. A member of the Council and Executive Committee of the Yorkshire Provincial Division of the National Unionist Association. President of the Shipley Parliamentary Division Unionist Association. Late President of the Bradford Chamber of Commerce.
- Alderman Frederic William Senier JP For public and political services. Mayor of Leigh-on-Sea, 1919–20. Member of the War Pensions Committee and Chairman of Finance Committee. Chairman of Finance Committee, National Insurance.
- Hugh Corbet Vincent. For political and public services. Member of Carnarvonshire County Council for 15 years and member of Bangor City Council. Mayor of Bangor three times.

== Order of St Michael and St George ==
=== Companion of the Order of St Michael and St George (CMG) ===
- Sir Harry Ernest Brittain KBE MP For services in connection with the Imperial Press Conferences.

== Order of the British Empire ==
=== Knight Commander of the Order of the British Empire (KBE) ===
- Robert Patrick Malcolm Gower CB CVO private secretary to the prime minister.
- Lieutenant-Colonel Walter Edgeworth-Johnstone CB late Commissioner of Dublin Metropolitan Police.
- Gershom Stewart, Imperial Services. For Colonial and Imperial Services.

=== Dame Commander of the Order of the British Empire (DBE) ===
- Caroline Beatrix Bridgeman, Chairman of the Women's Organisation of National Unionist Association.
- Beatrix Margaret Hudson Lyall CBE JP Member of Central Unionist Council. Member Ladies' Grand Council Primrose League. Member for East Fulham on the London County Council.
