= Sun Rising through Vapour =

Painting by J. M. W. Turner

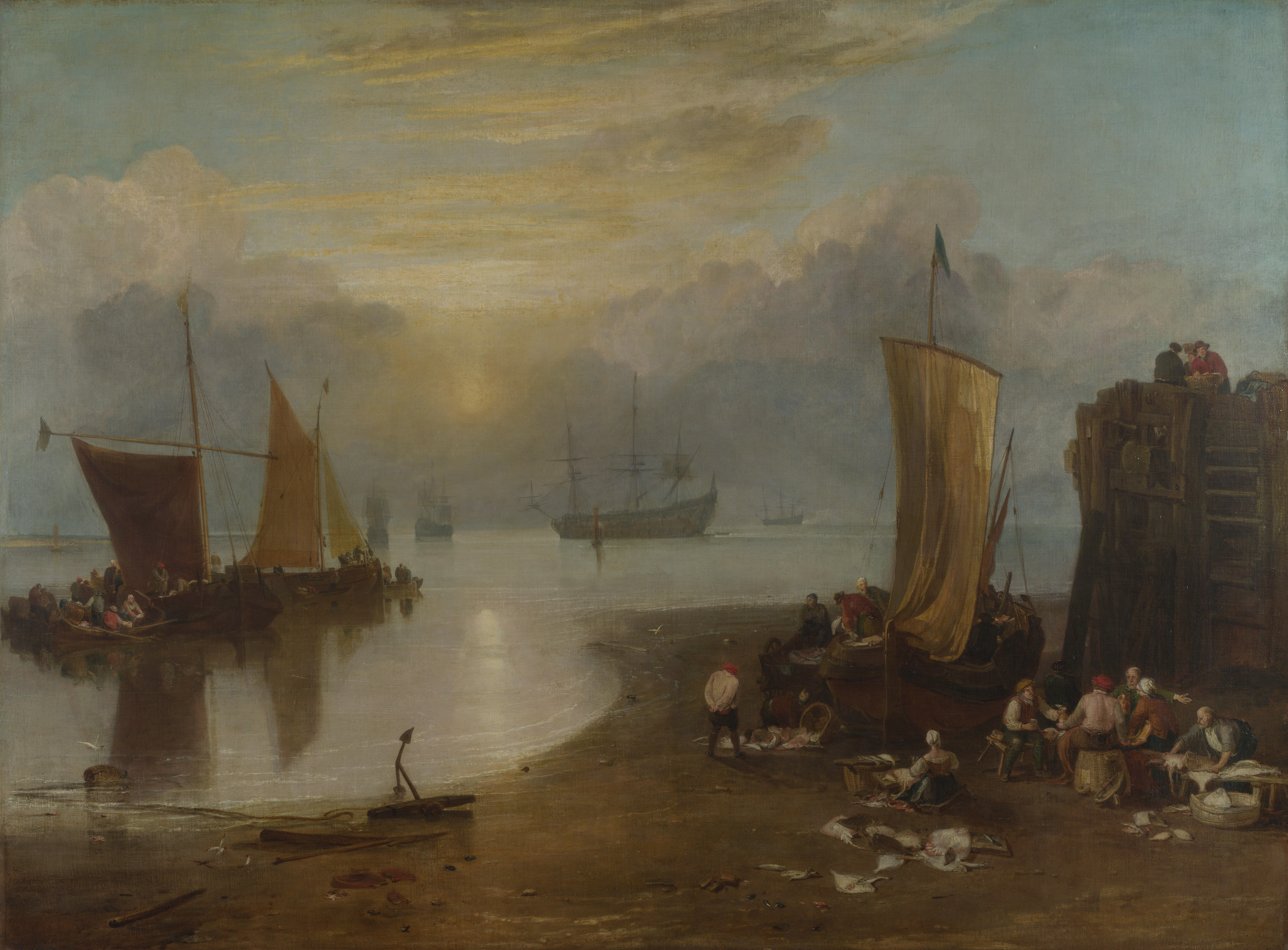
- Artist: J. M. W. Turner
- Year: 1807
- Medium: Oil on canvas
- Dimensions: 134.5 cm × 179 cm (53.0 in × 70 in)
- Location: National Gallery, London
- Accession: NG479
- Website: nationalgallery.org.uk/paintings/joseph-mallord-william-turner-sun-rising-through-vapour

Sun Rising through Vapour is a c.1807 landscape painting by the English artist J.M.W. Turner. Also known by the longer title Sun Rising through Vapour: Fishermen Cleaning and Selling Fish it depicts a scene on the English coast.

It was exhibited at the Royal Academy's Summer Exhibition at Trafalgar Square along with his genre painting The Country Blacksmith. The painting demonstrates the influence of seventeenth century Dutch art on Turner and in 1810 he exhibited it in his own studio under the changed title of Dutch Boats. It was acquired by the art collector Sir John Leicester in 1818. However, following the latter's death Turner bought the painting back.

Today it is in the collection of the National Gallery on Trafalgar Square in London having been part of the Turner Bequest of 1856.

== See also ==
- List of paintings by J. M. W. Turner
- Sun Setting through Vapour, 1809 painting by Turner

== Bibliography ==
- Bailey, Anthony. J.M.W. Turner: Standing in the Sun. Tate Enterprises Ltd, 2013.
- Hamilton, James. Turner - A Life. Sceptre, 1998.
