= Portrait of Countess Golovina =

Painting by Élisabeth Vigée Le Brun

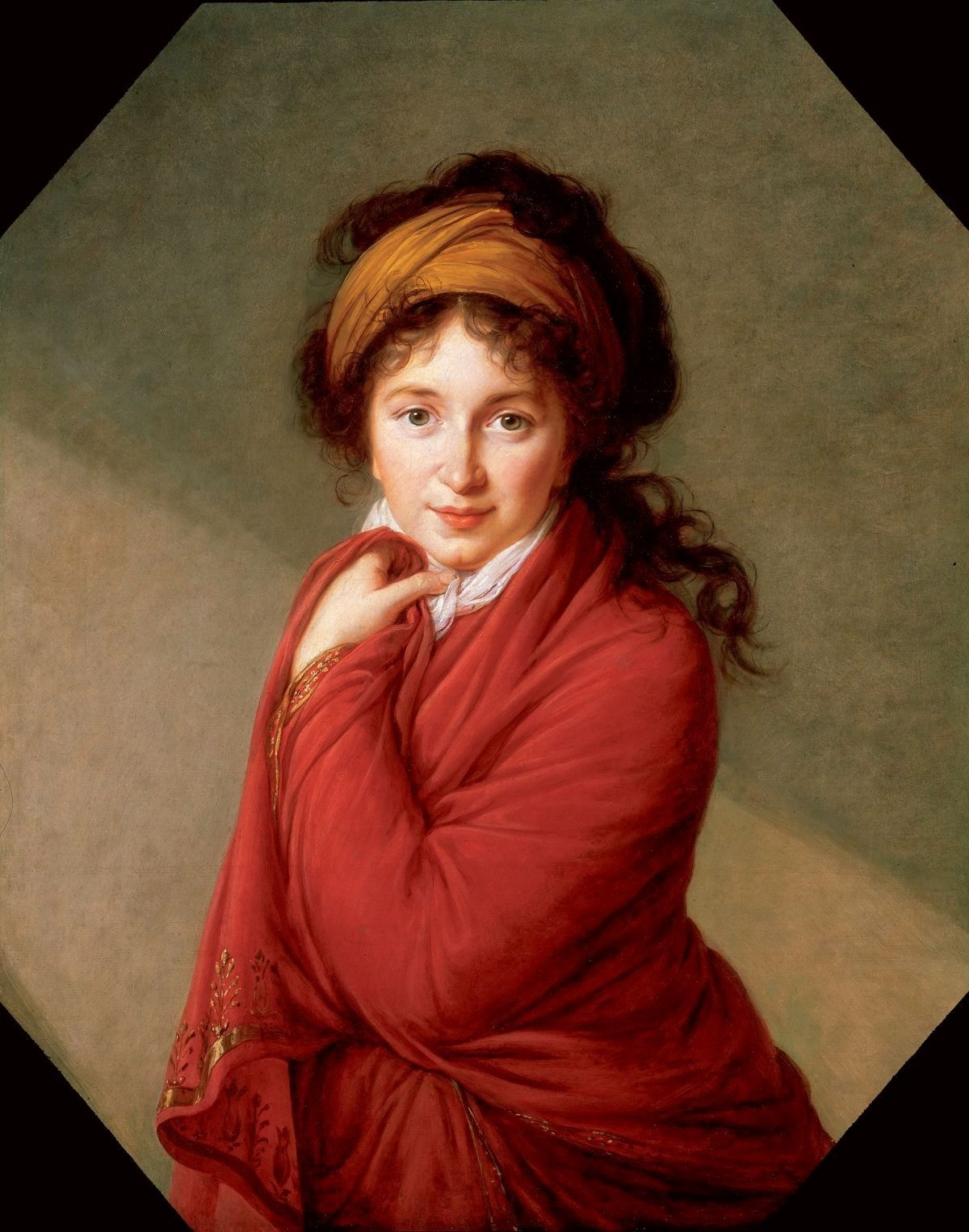
- Artist: Élisabeth Vigée Le Brun
- Year: c.1800
- Type: Oil on canvas, portrait painting
- Dimensions: 83.5 cm × 66.7 cm (32.9 in × 26.3 in)
- Location: Barber Institute of Fine Arts, Birmingham

Portrait of Countess Golovina is a c.1800 portrait painting by the French artist Élisabeth Vigée Le Brun. It depicts the Russian aristocrat Varvara Golovina. The painting was produced during Vigée Le Brun's lengthy exile from her native France during the Revolutionary era. While in Saint Petersburg the two woman became friends and the countess sat for her wearing a red shawl. Today the painting is in the collection of the Barber Institute of Fine Arts in Birmingham, which acquired it in 1980.

== Bibliography ==
- Baillio, Joseph, Baetjer, Katharine & Lang, Paul. Vigée Le Brun. Metropolitan Museum of Art, 2016.
- Goodden, Angelica. The Sweetness of Life: A Biography of Elisabeth Louise Vigée Le Brun. Andre Deutsch, 1997.
- Moyle, Franny. Mrs Kauffman and Madame Le Brun: The Entwined Lives of Two Great Eighteenth-Century Women Artists. Bloomsbury Publishing, 2025.
