= Varvara Golovina =

Russian artist and memoirist

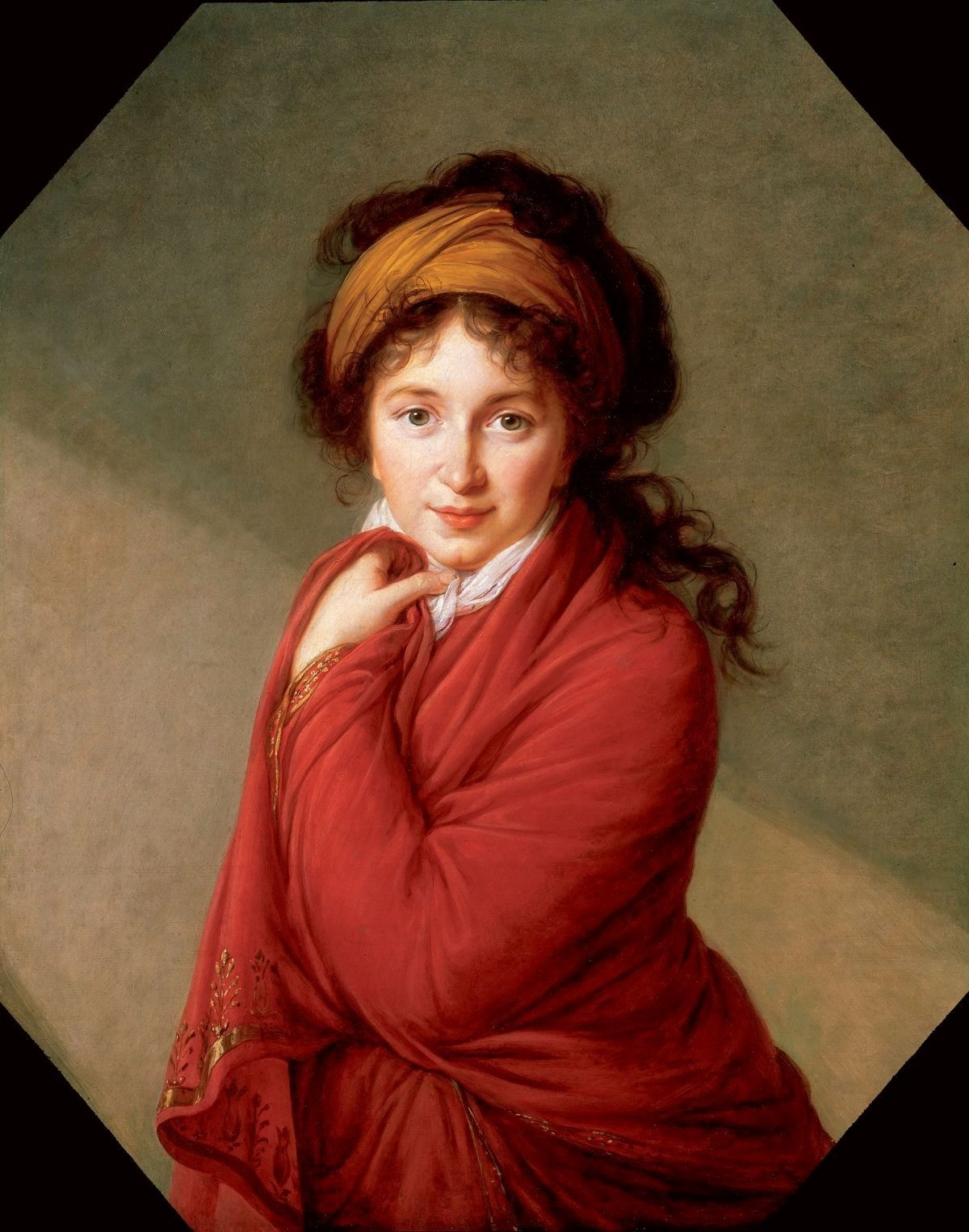
- Portrait of Countess Golovina by Elisabeth Vigée-Lebrun, 1800
- Born: Varvara Nikolayevna Golitsyna; 1766; Russian Empire
- Died: 11 September 1821 (aged 54–55); Paris, France
- Noble family: Golitsyn
- Spouse: Nikolai Nikolaevich Golovin
- Father: Nikolai Fyodorovich Golitsyn (1728-1780)
- Mother: Praskovia Ivanovna Shuvalova (1734-1802)
- Occupation: artist and memoirist

Countess Varvara Nikolayevna Golovina, née Princess Golitsyna (Russian: Варвара Николаевна Головина, княжна Голицына, 1766–11 September 1821) was an artist and memoirist from Russian nobility, maid of honour of the Russian court, a close confidant of Empress Elizabeth, favorite Ivan Shuvalov's niece and Dame of Order of Saint Catherine (1816).

== Biography ==
She was the youngest child of Lieutenant-General Nikolai Fyodorovich Golitsyn (1728-1780) and Princess Praskovia Ivanovna Shuvalova (1734-1802). She had two brothers: Fyodor (1751-1827) and Ivan (1759-1777).

Varvara's father was from the House of Golitsyn. Her mother, Praskovia Ivanovna, was a sister of Ivan Shuvalov (1727-1798), whom she inherited tendency to literature and art.

Varvara grew up on the Petrovsky estate in the Moscow province. Her mother was mild, kind, although indecisive character, who loved art and valued education.

In 1777, Varvara moved with her parents to Saint Petersburg. After the death of her father, she moved with her mother to the house of her uncle, Ivan Shuvalov, on the corner of Nevsky Prospekt and Malaya Sadovaya.

Varvara was fond of painting and music. She participated in concerts of Tsarskoe Selo and the Winter Palace, where she sang songs of his own composition.

In 1783, she was appointed a maid of honor at the court of Catherine the Great.

=== Marriage ===
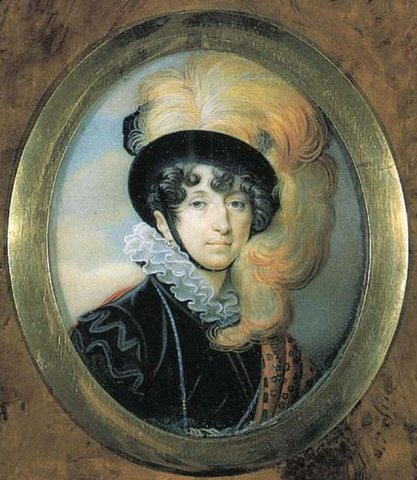
Varvara Golovina.

At the court, Varvara met a handsome Count Nikolai Nikolayevich Golovin (1756-1820), a grandson of Generalissimo Field Marshal Count Fyodor Alexeyevich Golovin. They liked each other, but Princess Golitsyna opposed an immediate marriage, finding it premature. Golitsyna went on four years of foreign travel, spending much of her time in Paris, but his acquaintances and connections there had nothing to do with literature or the arts.

Upon returning from a trip, Varvara married Count Golovin, on 4 October 1786. The wedding was celebrated at the Winter Palace.

The Golovins were very fond of each other, and gave the impression of a happy couple. Descriptions of Nikolai Golovin by his contemporaries were controversial, most of them unfriendly. Promoted to the rank of colonel, he felt no inclination to any military or the civil service, but his strict honesty was noted.

In 1796, Nikolai Golovin was appointed to the court of Grand Duke Alexander Pavlovich (future Alexander I).

=== Conversion and later life ===
At the same time, the Countess Golovin became closer to the French emigrant Princess de Tarant and under her influence, converted to Roman Catholicism.

In 1802, Varvara Golovina went to Paris for several years, returning to Russia in 1805.

A few months later the Countess Golovin with his family followed her. In Paris, they were accepted in the high society of Château de Saint-Germain-en-Laye, but the beginning of the Napoleonic wars forced them to return to Russia. With scarce resources, Golovina accepted the Tarant's offer and moved to her home. The two friends were inseparable till the Princess's death in 1814.

Thanks to the efforts of her husband, on April 9, 1816 Countess Golovin was granted in chevalier's ladies of the Order of St. Catherine (small cross), and her younger daughter as the maid of honor.

Golovina was close friends with Louise of Baden, later Empress Elizabeth, who was deeply unhappy in Russia. In her memoirs, written with the direction of the empress, she described the life at the courts of Catherine the Great and Paul I.

In 1818, for health reasons she made her second trip to France. Returning briefly to Russia in 1820, she again come back to France.

She returned to Paris and died there in 1821, and was buried at the Père Lachaise Cemetery. Her memoirs were later published in France.

== Children ==
In marriage, Varvara had four children:

- Son (1787, died soon after birth)
- Praskovia Nikolayevna (1790-1869), author of "Memories", converted to Catholicism, since 1819 the wife of Count Jan-Maximilian Fredro (1784-1845).
- Daughter (1792, died soon after birth)
- Yelizaveta Nikolayevna (1795-1867) — maid of honor, converted to Catholicism, married to diplomat Lev Pototsky, or Potocki (1789-1850).

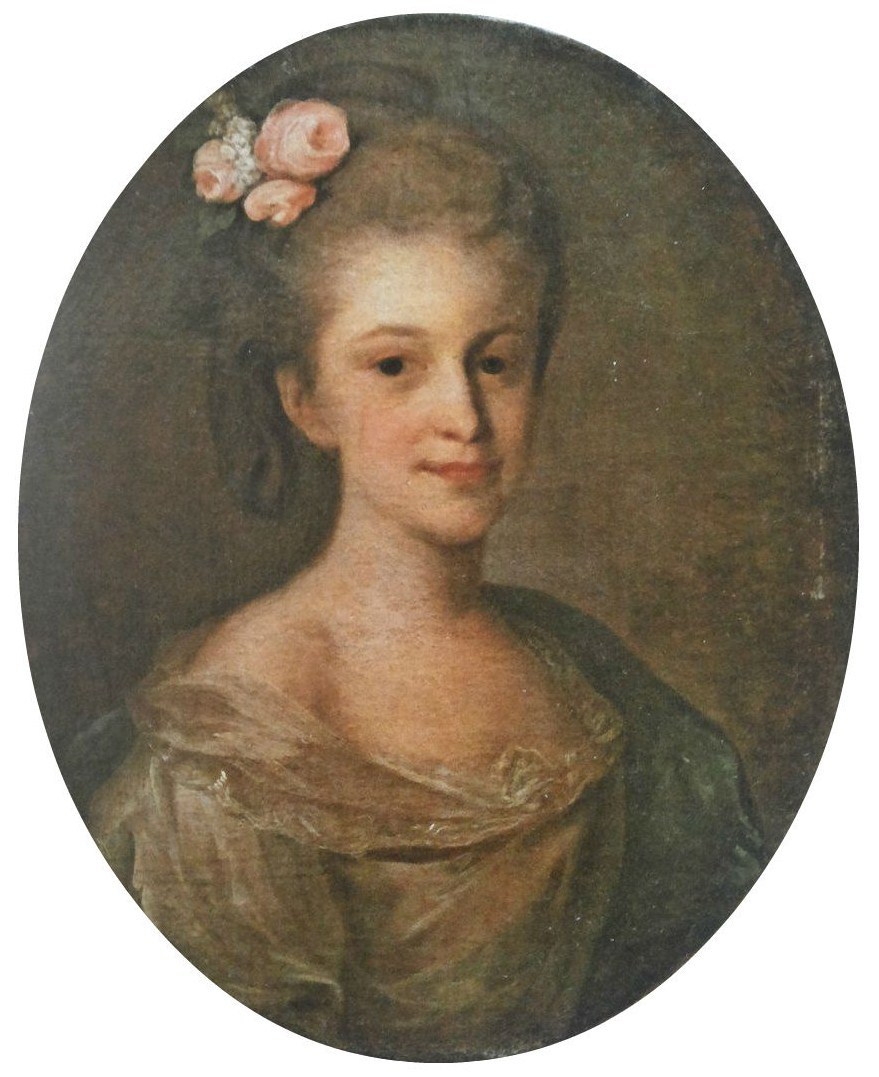
Varvara Golovina in her youth

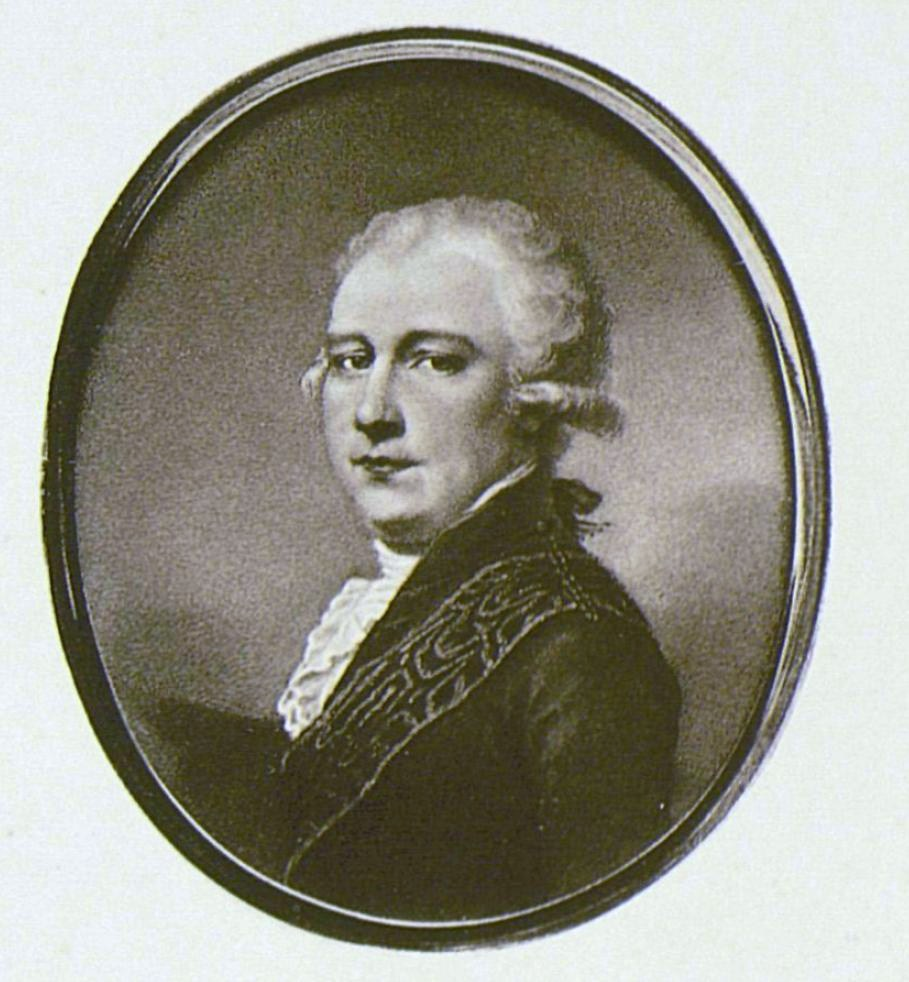
Husband Nikolai Golovin

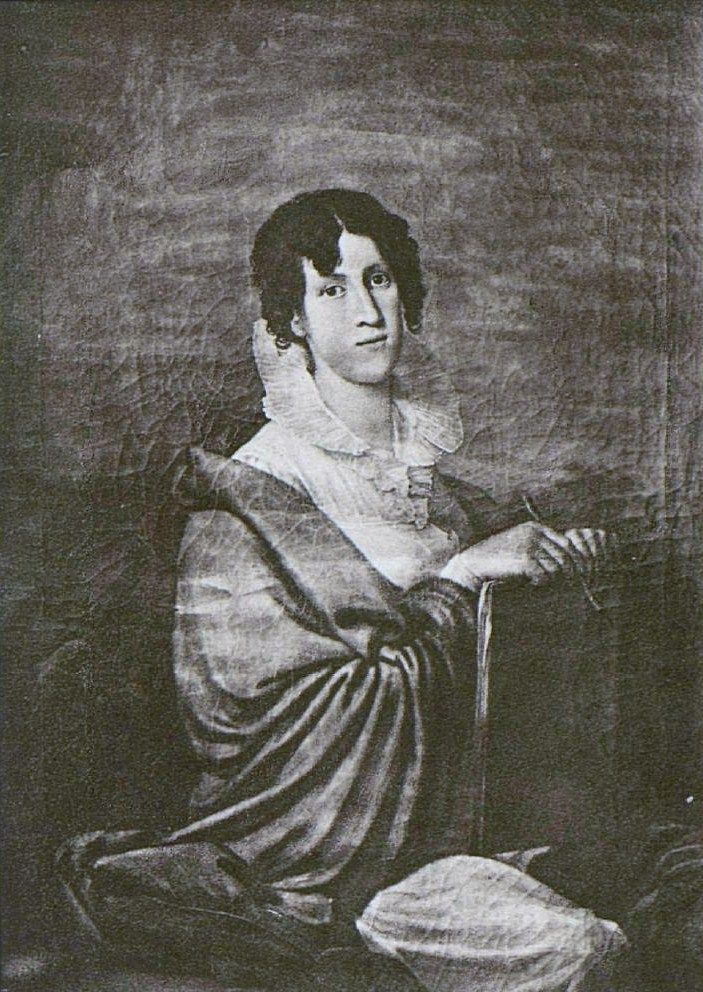
daughter Praskovia

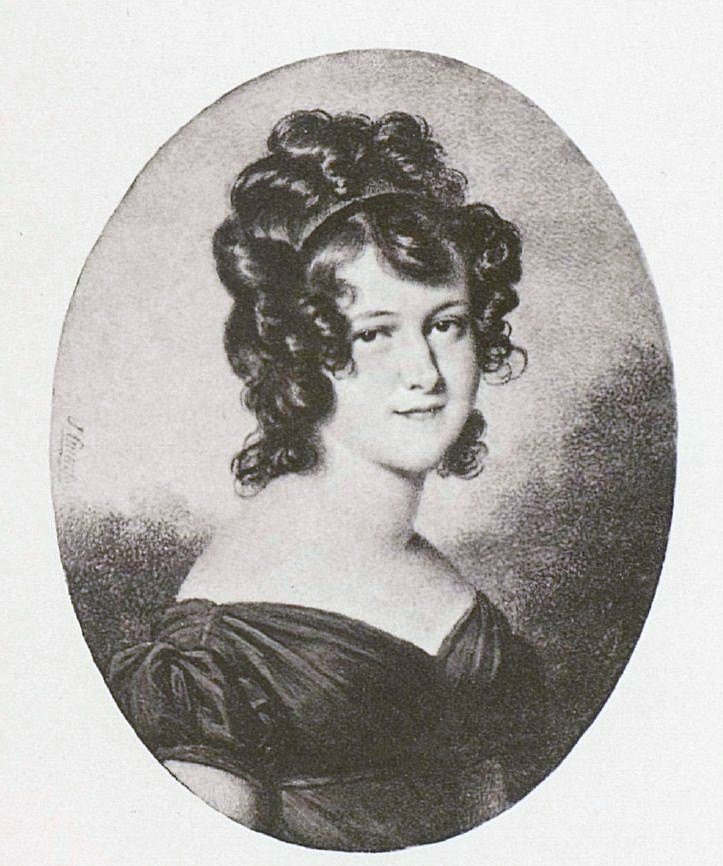
daughter Yelizaveta

== Works ==
- Memoirs of Countess Golovine: a Lady at the Court of Catherine II

== Compositions ==
Varvara Golovina was also an accomplished composer.

1. Solitaire sejour
2. Le beau Fernand
3. Le Montagnard
4. Roses d'amour

== For Further Listening ==
Here are links to recordings which includes the compositions mentioned in this article:

Russian Women Composers of the 18th Century The first 3 songs listed in the Composition section can be found in this recording.

Music of the Russian Princesses The fourth song listed in the Composition section can be found in this recording.

== See also ==
- Russian culture
