= Portrait of François Langlois (Van Dyck) =

Painting by Anthony Van Dyck

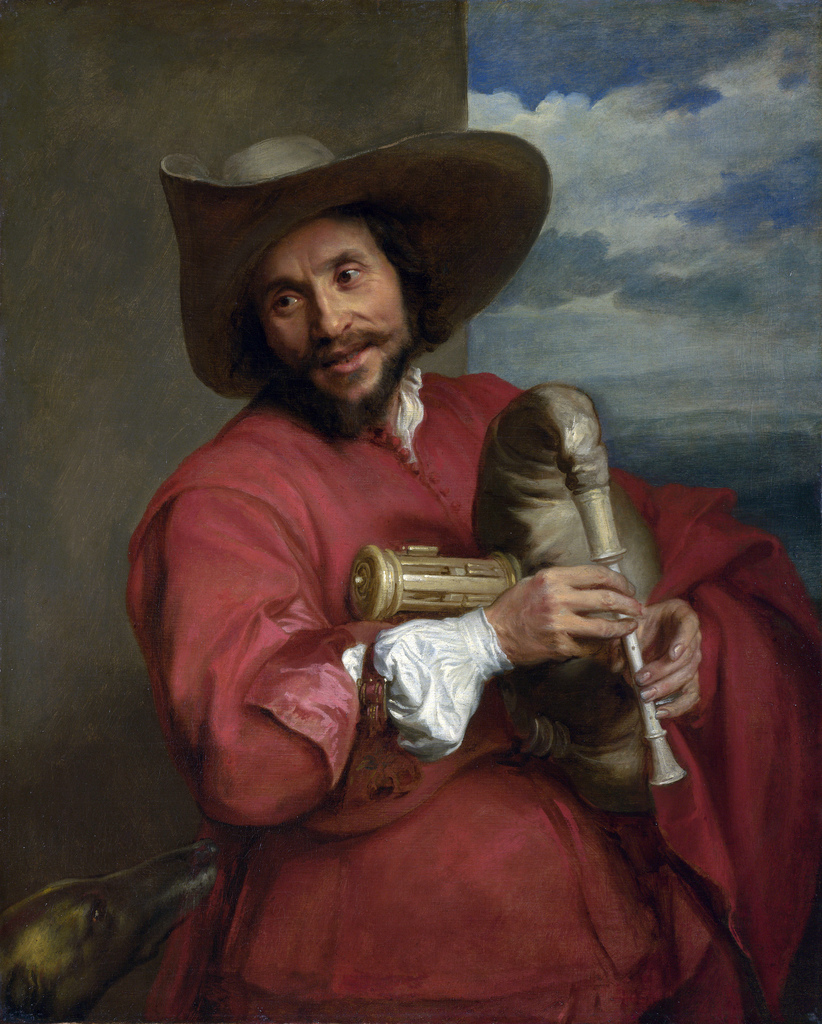
- Artist: Anthony Van Dyck
- Year: Probably the Early 1630s
- Medium: Oil on Canvas
- Movement: Flemish Baroque
- Dimensions: 97.8 x 80 cm
- Location: The Barber Institute of Fine Arts and The National Gallery

Portrait of François Langlois is a Portrait painting by the 17th century Flemish Painter Anthony Van Dyck. This painting depicts François Langlois, who is believed to have met Van Dyck in Rome in the 1620s, as a Savoyard wearing a red coat and a cocked hat while holding a bagpipe tucked under his arm. To his left a dog peers up at him while a vast landscape is visible behind François Langlois.

== Provenance ==
The painting was first recorded at the estate of François Langlois in 1677, Then it was recorded in the collection of Charles François de Broglie and then in the estate sale of Louis-François de Bourbon-Conti in 1777.. It was then recorded in the collection of Charles de Choiseul after being bought from Alexandre Joseph Paillet, then it was sold in 1808 by Charles de Choiseul and again in 1808 by John Hoppner. Then it went through multiple private collectors until it was purchased from Thomas Agnew & Sons by the Cowdray family in 1919. Finally it was jointly purchased by the Barber Institute of Fine Arts and the National Gallery in 1997 with contributions from the Art Fund
