= Sun Setting through Vapour =

Painting by J. M. W. Turner

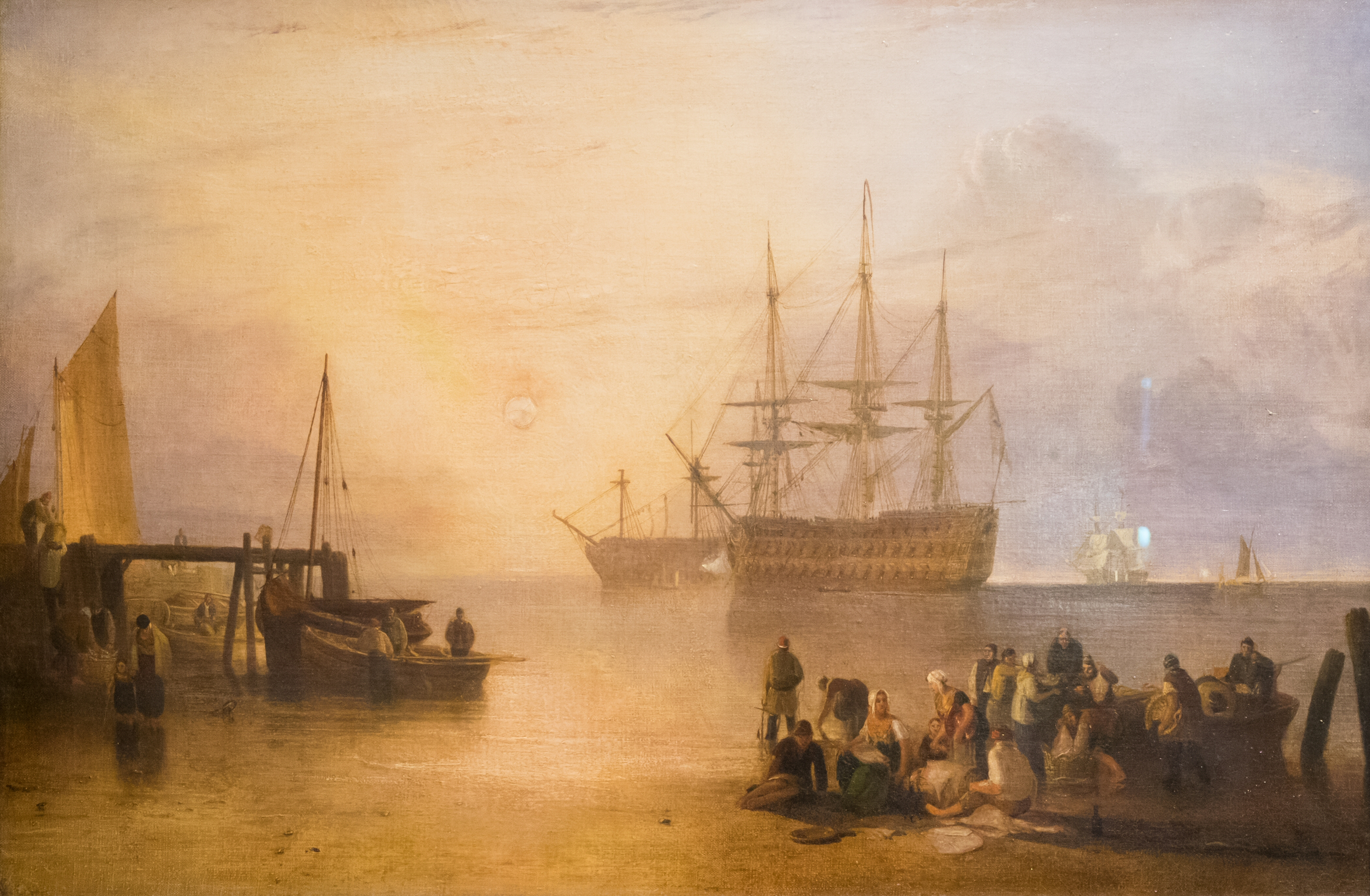
- Artist: J.M.W. Turner
- Year: 1809
- Type: Oil on canvas, landscape painting
- Dimensions: 69.2 cm × 101.6 cm (27.2 in × 40.0 in)
- Location: Barber Institute of Fine Arts, Birmingham

Sun Setting through Vapour is an 1809 landscape painting by the British artist J.M.W. Turner. It depicts a scene on the coast of England, the bright sun blending with the mist in the air. In the foreground fisherman are shown on the beach with their catch. Prominently out to sea is a Royal Navy ship-of-the-line (sometimes identified as Admiral Nelson's flagship at Trafalgar HMS Victory). Behind it lies a prison hulk, a further reference to the ongoing Napoleonic Wars.

It is also known by the alternative title Sun Rising through Vapour, a name it shares with a painting in the collection of the National Gallery in London. The painting was purchased by Turner's friend and client Walter Fawkes. It is now in the Barber Institute of Fine Arts in Birmingham, having been acquired in 1938.

== See also ==
- List of paintings by J. M. W. Turner
- Sun Rising through Vapour, c. 1807 painting by Turner

== Bibliography ==
- Bailey, Anthony. J.M.W. Turner: Standing in the Sun. Tate Enterprises Ltd, 2013.
- Boime, Albert. A Social History of Modern Art, Volume 2: Art in an Age of Bonapartism, 1800-1815. University of Chicago Press, 1993.
- Hamilton, James. Turner's Britain. Merrell, 2003
- Reynolds, Graham. Turner. Thames & Hudson, 2022.
- Spencer-Longhurst, Paul. The Sun Rising Through Vapour: Turner's Early Seascapes. Third Millennium Information, 2003.
