= Sir Henry Barber, 1st Baronet =

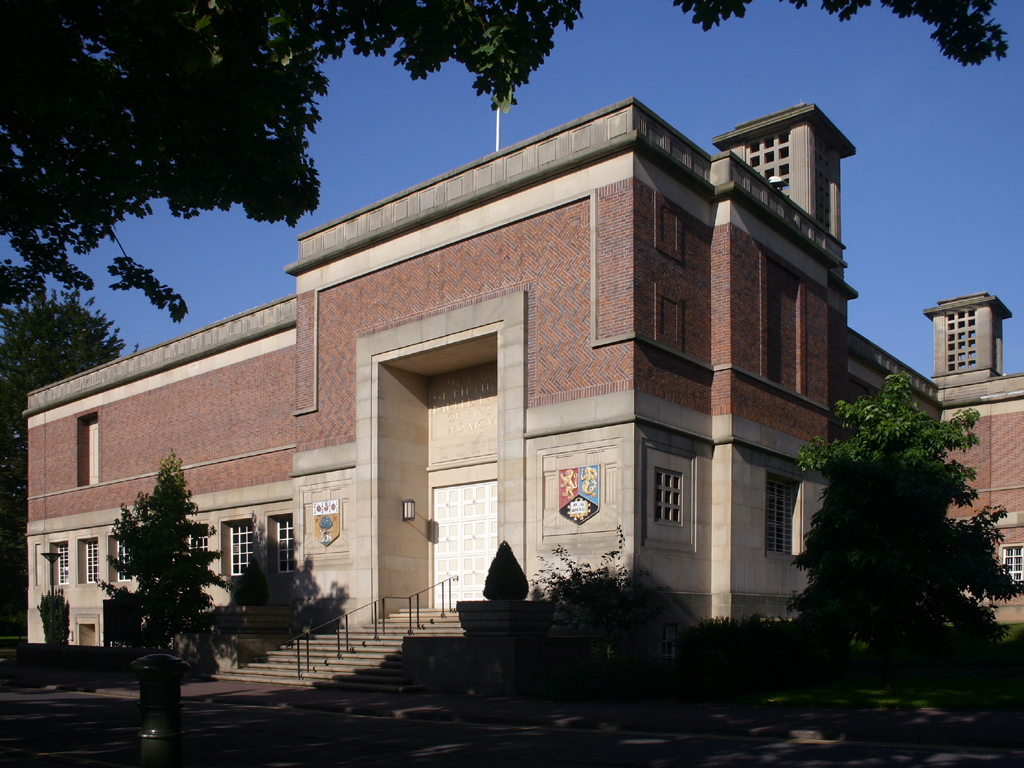
The Art Deco Barber Institute of Fine Arts in the University of Birmingham, founded by his widow

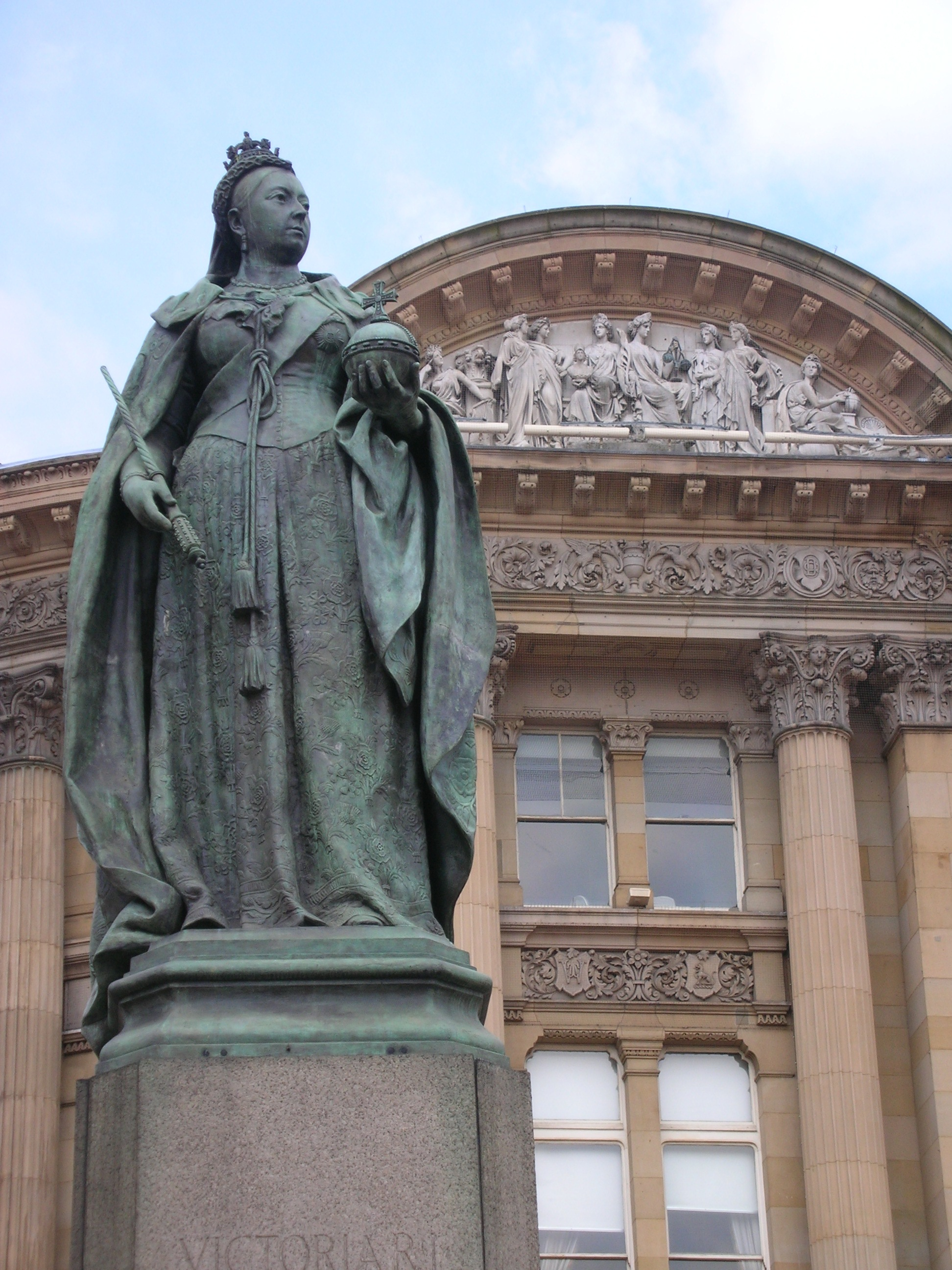
Statue of Queen Victoria in Victoria Square, Birmingham, donated by Barber

Sir William Henry Barber, 1st Baronet (9 November 1860 – 2 July 1927), known as Henry Barber, was a wealthy solicitor and property developer who made his fortune expanding Birmingham's sprawling suburbs, building and renting out 5,000 properties in areas including Sparkbrook, Hay Mills, Acocks Green, Bordesley Green and Aston.

He was born in Handsworth (then in Staffordshire, now Birmingham), the eldest son of a master jeweller, and grew up in the city's Jewellery Quarter before training as a solicitor.

In 1893, he married Martha Constance Hattie Onions, who was an heiress, daughter of Simon Brookes Onions, of the Birmingham family of bellowsmakers, J. C. Onions (later, Alldays and Onions Engineering Company). The couple moved into the eighteenth-century Culham Court on the Thames near Henley in the same year, which they rented.

By his mid-thirties the couple retired but their connections with the city remained strong.

He donated the original marble statue to Queen Victoria in Victoria Square, Birmingham in 1897. Designed by Thomas Brock it was unveiled on 10 January 1901, twelve days before the death of the Queen.

In the 1924 Prime Minister's Resignation Honours, Barber was created a baronet, of Culham Court in the County of Berkshire, for 'Political Services to Birmingham'. On his death, the baronetcy became extinct.

== Henry Barber Trust ==
After his death, Barber's widow founded the Barber Institute of Fine Arts at the University of Birmingham for the study and encouragement of art and music. Lady Barber's inheritance was also dedicated to the Institute and was used to expand the collection and fund the construction of a new building: the Grade I listed building of art deco architecture was designed by Robert Atkinson and opened in 1939 by Queen Mary.

Baronetage of the United Kingdom
New creation	Baronet (of Culham Court); 1924–1927	Extinct
