= Vera the Silent =

Orthodox ascetic, recluse of the St Volodymyr's Cathedral in Syrkov, Novgorod region

Recluse Vera the Silent
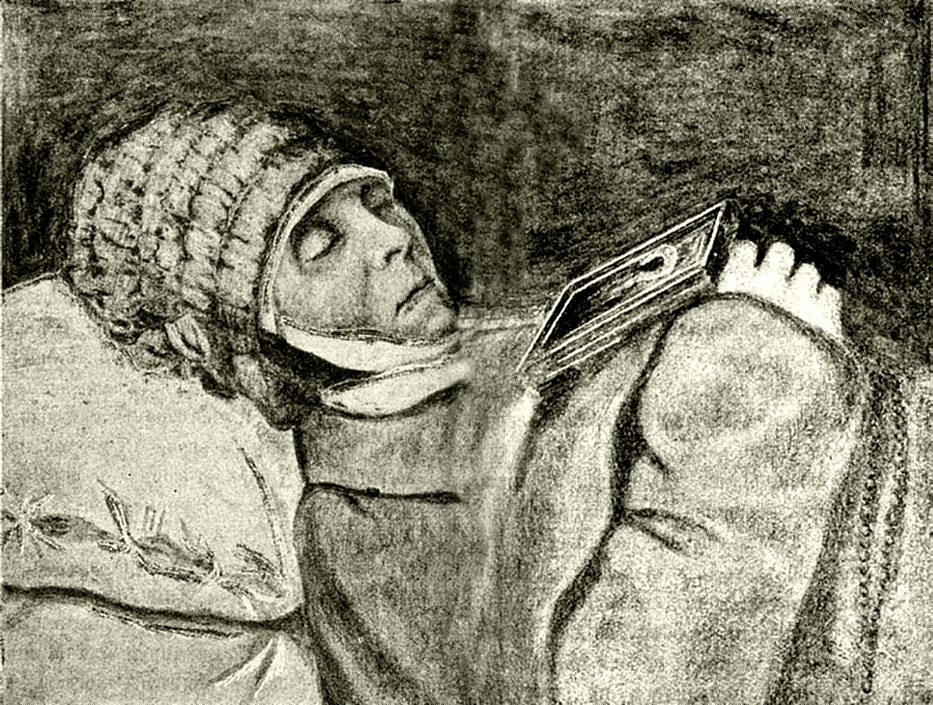
- Born: unknown
- Died: 30 May 1861; Syrkov monastery, Veliky Novgorod, Rusia
- Venerated in: Eastern Orthodox Church

Vera the Silent (? - 6 [18] May 1861) was an Orthodox ascetic, a hermit of the Syrkov Maiden Monastery in the Novgorod region, who kept a vow of silence for 23 years.

Vera the Silent owes her fame to a legend in which she is identified with Empress Elizabeth Alexeevna —Alexander I's wife— who allegedly followed his example after the emperor, having faked his death, became a Siberian elder Feodor Kuzmich.

== Biography ==
=== Emergence ===
The unknown woman who called herself Vera Alexandrovna appeared in Tikhvin in 1834 and lived in the house of the landlord Vera Mikhailovna Kharlamova. She was respected for her piety and scrupulous adherence to religious rules, but she never talked about her past or gave her surname. She was often seen in the Tikhvin Dormition Monastery praying before the Theotokos of Tikhvin. She also made pilgrimages to other local monasteries. The Tikhvinians treated Vera Alexandrovna with great respect, often visiting her for spiritual talks and sending her to their children to teach them prayers and the law of God. Thus, if we believe the surviving sources, she lived about three years. Then, having learned that the wife of the deacon of the Vinnitsa pogost in the province of Olonets was seriously ill, she left Tikhvin and voluntarily went to take care of her.

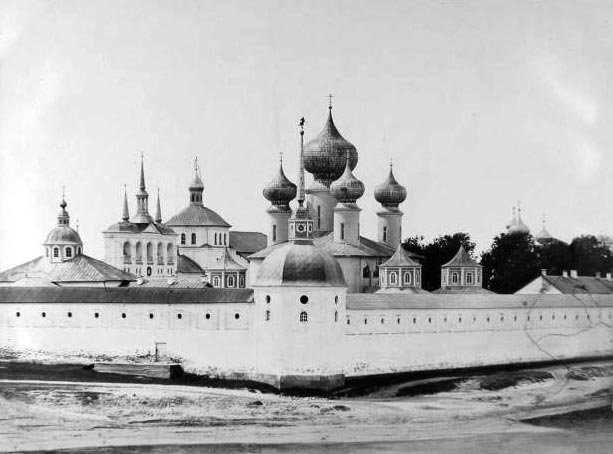
Dormition Monastery, Tikhvin

A year later she returned to Tikhvin, but soon left the city for good, as is believed, burdened by excessive attention to herself. It was caused by the story of a Tikhvin landlord that in the St. Peter's Fast he saw how Vera Alexandrovna was transformed after taking communion and became like an angel (this story became known in 1852 and in the Syrkov monastery, where Vera then lived, by the landowner Kharlamova, who came to visit her). Vera moved to the Valday village of Beryozovsky Ryadok, where she liked the worship and piety of the parishioners of the local church, and at the request of the peasant Prokopiy Trofimov agreed to stay there for some time. There she lived in a separate hut, where she took in only children, painted for them pictures of Christ and the Mother of God, taught them prayers and how to read. Such a life of Vera lasted about 9 months and aroused the suspicion of the police. In 1838 Vera Alexandrovna was arrested for not having a passport. On a stage she was sent to Valdai prison, where, according to the legend, when asked about her surname and origin, she replied to the investigator: "Judged heavenly, I am the dust of the earth; judged earthly, I am above you". The policeman continued to insist, and all he achieved was that Vera Alexandrovna finally stopped answering questions. After that, for 23 years and until her death, she did not open her mouth, answering questions only occasionally by means of notes or very rarely by scraps of sentences.

The police considered the strange prisoner insane, and after a year and a half in Novgorod prison she was sent to the Home for the Insane in Koloma, where she spent another year and a half. During her stay in the asylum, Vera wrote the essay "The Lamentation of the Mother of God at the Passion of Her Son, the Lord Jesus on the Cross". Vera Alexandrovna's notes on this period of her life have been preserved. About her stay in the asylum she wrote:

"I felt good there; I was blissfully happy there... I thank God for allowing me to live with the prisoners and the poor. God has endured more than that for us sinners!

=== Life in Syrkov Monastery ===
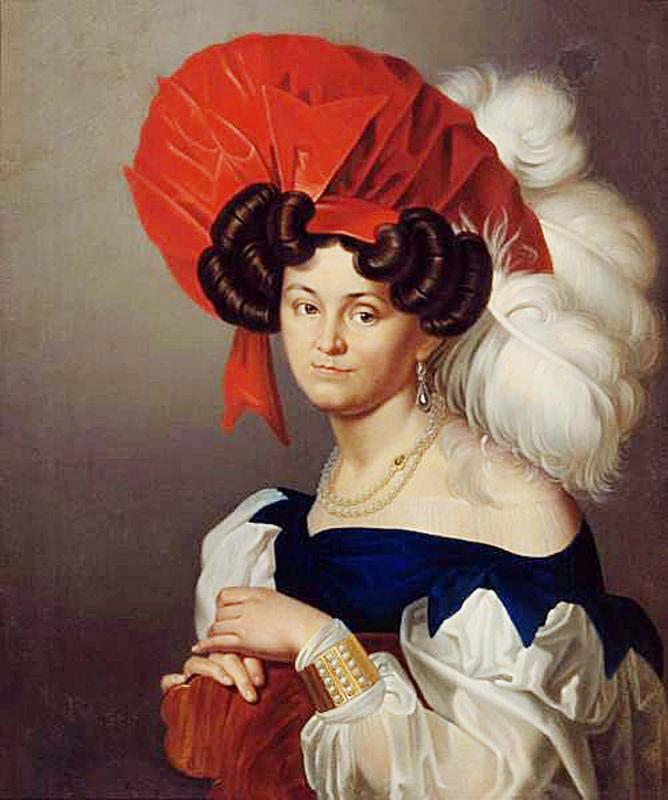
Countess Anna Orlova (secretly tonsured Agniya)

In the Kolomovsky house of the insane Vera was found by a local benefactress — Countess Anna Alexeevna Orlova-Chesmenskaya (daughter of Alexei Orlov) and offered the "silent woman" to settle in the Syrkov Cathedral. It is said that she received information about Vera from St. Petersburg. For Vera, who gave her consent, the abbess of the convent came and took her to the convent. About Vera's transfer to a convent the decree of the Novgorod Spiritual Consistory from April 10, 1841 was issued, in which it was determined that Vera would be placed in a convent at the expense of Countess Anna Orlova. According to the church historian Count M. V. Tolstoy, Vera in the convent took hostile. The abbess went to St. Petersburg Metropolitan Seraphim with a request to expel the silent woman from the convent. To this request the Metropolitan replied:

"You stupid woman! You and I would rather be thrown out than her, and don't you dare mention it".

Vera lived in a separate hut cell, with a single whitewashed room and a small hall leading into it. The furnishings of the cell included a cupboard with books, an analogion for reading the Holy Scriptures, a copper samovar, two wooden chairs, a bed and a cuckoo clock (on which Vera pasted a picture of a shepherd's life with quotations from the Bible about death and the hereafter). Supporters of the legend point out that her cell was an "exact copy" of the cell of Feodor Kuzmich in Siberia (an hermit who, according to the legend of the House of Romanov, became Emperor Alexander I) — which seems very problematic due to the great distance and complexity of communication with Siberian cities and especially with remote villages. Vera's bedside icon was the picture of Christ in bonds, which had been with her since the time of her stay in the home for the insane, in front of which she kept an altar lamp. Vera slept on a bed covered with thin felt, with firewood placed on the sides, forming a kind of coffin for her, reminding her of the brevity of life.

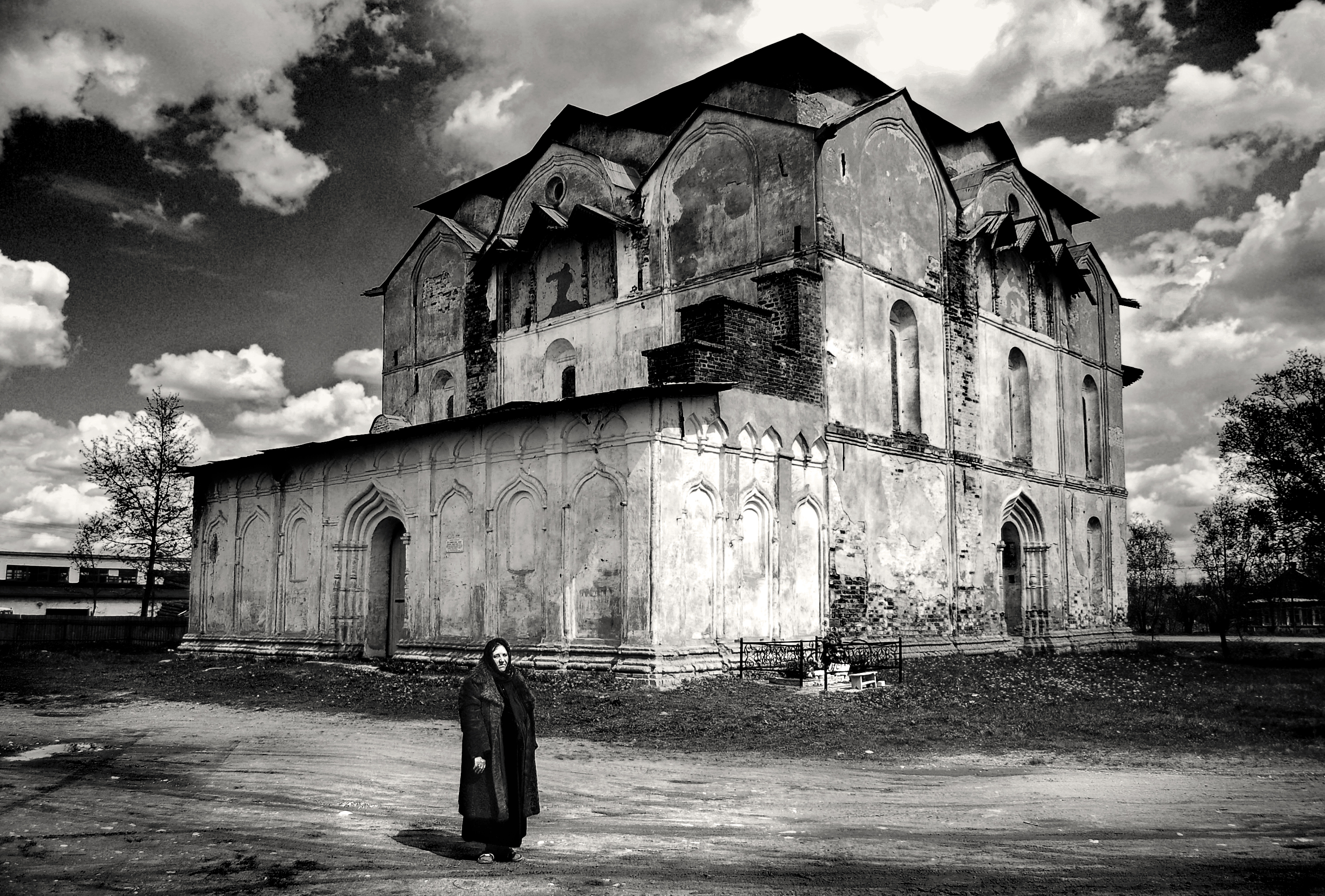
St. Vladimir's Cathedral in Syrkov

Vera's first cell-mate was the nun Mariamna, who suffered from epilepsy. Like many sisters, she insulted Vera and once, according to N. Gruzinsky, the priest of the Syrkov convent, she twisted her leg after a disrespectful rebuke about the silent nun, which was considered God's punishment. Countess Anna Orlova appointed a new cell-mate from among her courtiers. The nun Amfiloya (died in 1901) was deaf, and supporters of the existence of some mystery connected with the Silent Woman of Syrkov claim that the Countess, being initiated into it, specially chose a deaf servant so that she could not hear if Vera in delirium or by forgetfulness would say something about herself.

In the monastery, Vera Alexandrovna until her death led a reclusive and very ascetic life, which limited her presence in the monastery cell and in the church (the exception was her traditional exit on Easter, when she climbed the monastery wall for prayer). Vera's confessor was the priest John Lebedev, to whom she confessed by means of notes, which he burned in the flame of a candle after the sacrament. Most of the food brought to her (the hermit did not use the monastery refectory) was given to the beggars or fed to the birds. Vera was unpretentious in her dress: in her cell she wore a white knee-length dress and a mobcap, to go to the temple she wore a lustrine jacket (in winter she wore an old cotton greatcoat), a cap and a shawl.

During her stay at the Syrkov monastery, Vera gained a reputation for clairvoyance, especially for predicting the death or recovery of sick children (she announced this by signs or gestures). Many visitors approached her with requests to pray for them or their loved ones, which Vera immediately did, asking in return to pray for them. To those who wished to receive something from her as a memento, she gave small boxes made of plain paper, which she decorated with crosses, Scripture verses, and bread crumbs. Vera also knitted rosaries out of worsted (wool yarn).

There is a legend that in 1848 the silent nun was visited by Emperor Nicholas I, who talked to her for several hours behind closed doors, and the nun responded to his words in writing, taking up several sheets of paper; when he left, the cautious (or graceful) emperor politely kissed the nun's hand and burned her notes with a lamp. Other visitors to Vera included Metropolitan Gregory (Postnikov) of Novgorod, St. Petersburg, Estonia and Finland, and the writer Count Mikhail Tolstoy.

=== Death ===
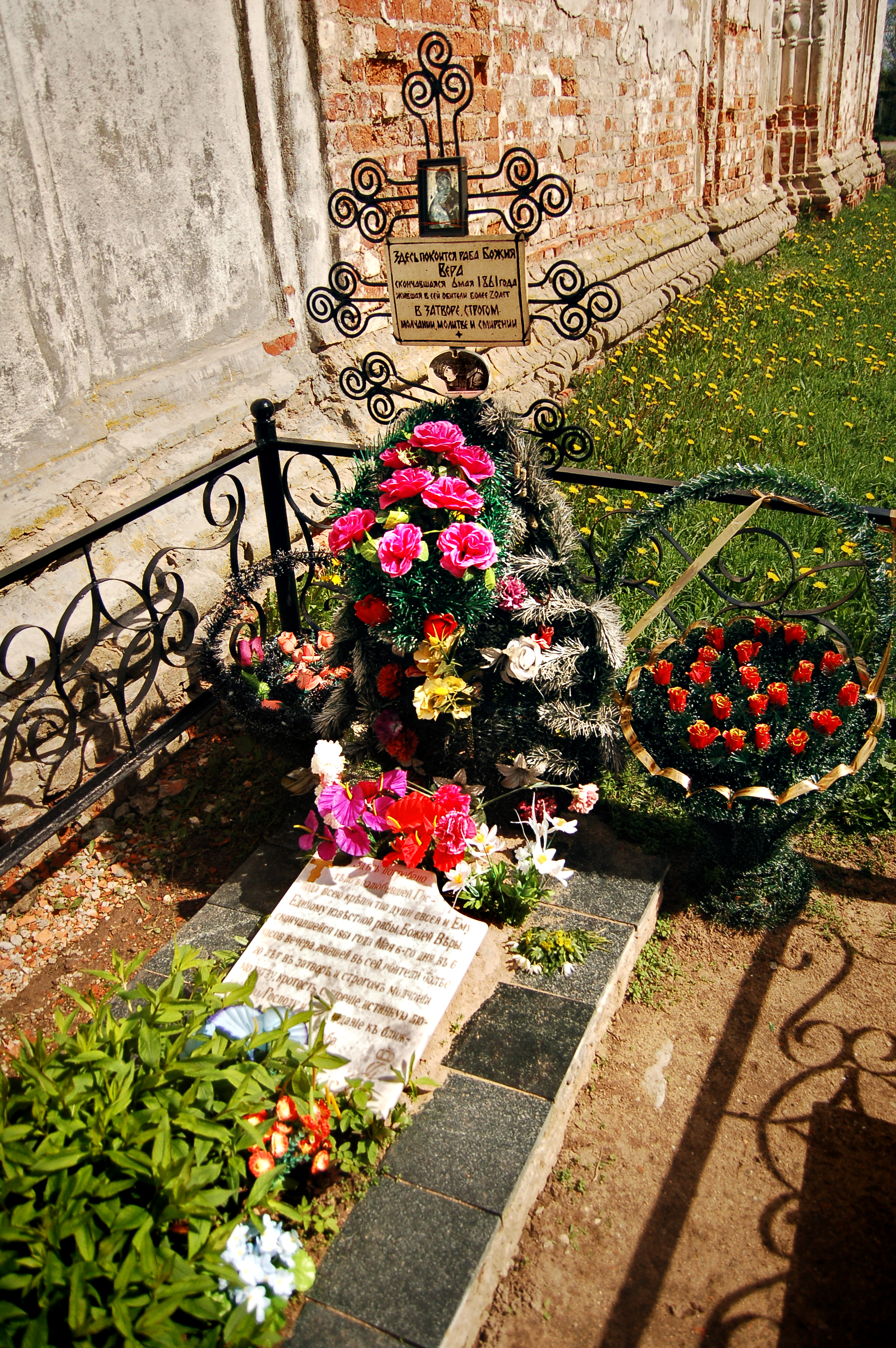
The cenotaph of Vera the Silent in the monastery of Syrkov

On Holy Saturday (April 22), she confessed (gave the priest a written confession), and when he returned it to her after reading it, Vera knelt down and turned the page — there was written: "Father, pray to the Lord for the remembrance of my soul. My end is near and the days are dry". On the 27th of April, Holy Week, as usual, she went up to the tower of the monastery, looked at Novgorod and prayed, then went to the northern gate of the monastery and looked at the Khutyn Monastery from there. Having taken some twigs, Vera went to the southern side of the cathedral church of the Vladimir icon of the Mother of God, laid the twigs on the ground and, having made three earthen arcs, pointed to them with her hand, thus determining the place of her burial. As the followers of the legend point out, this place was near the grave of the Abbess Alexandra Shubina, who was the godmother of the Empress when she converted to Orthodoxy in May 1793.

When she returned to her cell, the hermit had a high fever. Witnesses of her last days report that she had pneumonia. On April 30, she was already very weak, she wrote confused letters, she wrote a note to the abbess asking her to be sobered up, she asked that this sacrament be performed only by the priest and the abbess, and she added: "I ask and beg you not to take me away", that is, not to perform the washing of her body after her death. On May 5, she was confessed and received Holy Communion, and the nun took the priest into another room and asked him to come the next day and give the dying woman Holy Communion again. At that time, Vera entered the room, crossed herself on the icon of the Redeemer and pointed her hand to the ground. With this gesture she foretold the death of the sick person. About 6 o'clock in the evening of May 6, 1861, Vera the Silent died without revealing her true name and origin.

Vera's dying wish was not granted and her body was washed. They found a canvas corset with notes sewn on it at the level of the heart: the first was a prayer to Christ the Savior for the pardon of her soul, and the second, which could not be read because of its deterioration. On the third day after her death, an oil portrait of Vera on her deathbed was painted, and copies were distributed to many people. The burial took place on the fifth day after her death in a grave dug on the spot that Vera had marked with twigs before her death.

The monument erected on Vera's tomb at the expense of a St. Petersburg merchant resembled a granite coffin on bronze lion's paws, standing on a pedestal. On the western side of the tomb an icon of St. Vera the Martyr was placed, on the southern side the following inscription was carved:

Here is buried the body of the servant of God, Vera, who loved the Lord with all the strength of her soul and was known to Him alone, who died on May 6, 1861, at 6 o'clock in the evening, who lived in this convent for more than 20 years in seclusion and strict silence, who carried to the grave her prayer, gentleness, humility, true love for the Lord and compassion for her neighbors, and who peacefully surrendered her spirit to the Lord. Remember your servant in your kingdom, O Lord, and grant her heavenly rest from earthly toil and sorrow.

Until now the tomb has not been preserved, the cemetery was destroyed and a road was built through it. The memorial slab and the cenotaph of Vera Alexandrovna were restored near the walls of the Vladimir Cathedral of the Monastery.

Vera Alexandrovna's coded notes, which have not yet been published and researched, have been preserved. Also left after her death were extracts from the Gospels written in her own hand, the monograms "EA" and "P" in ink and cinnabar, as well as hagiographies of saints written in ink and cinnabar, and a gilded cross with a lock of blond hair (the crucifix, together with a copy of Vera's portrait, was found in 1892 among the belongings of the late abbess of the Valdai Korotsky Monastery).

== The rise of a legend ==
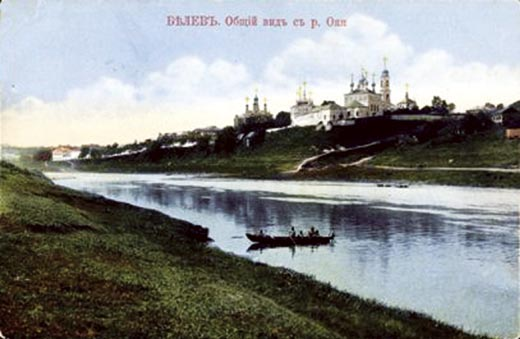
General view of Belyov from the Oka River

Rumors that the Empress Elizabeth Alexeievna did not really die, but after her husband "renounced the world", began to circulate soon after her death. Folded legend sounded like this: the Empress, passing through Belyov, gave knowledge of a certain landowner (whose name was never mentioned), who wanted to stay in her house. Upon her arrival, the Empress, covering her eyes with her hand, complained that there was "too much light" in the hall and categorically ordered it to be "reduced," after which the servants, rushing to fulfill the order, left only two candles burning. Then Elizaveta Alexeevna, claiming to be tired, asked to be left alone.

The landlady went to another part of the house and lay down on the sofa without undressing, but she was awakened at midnight and announced the death of the Empress. The landlady approached to kiss the hand of the deceased (someone had already changes her clothes and put them on the table), and allegedly realized that before her stood a completely different woman —as is sometimes believed, instead of blonde— brunette. Protoiereus Pokrovsky reports that at night in the house of the landowner was invited a priest from the Belyovo theological school, who confessed and gave communion to some wrapped woman. After the coffin containing the body of Elizabeth Alexeievna, which had been sealed in Belyov by order of Emperor Nicholas I, was taken away, a certain stranger appeared at the house of the local priest Donetsky. She was distinguished by good manners and high education, and when the owners asked her where she was from, she replied: "I cannot say who I am. Why do I wander? God's will". After that the rumor spread in the city that this wanderer was the Empress Elizabeth Alexeievna.

Supporters of the legend point to certain inconsistencies that allegedly occurred during the last months of the royal couple's stay in Taganrog. They recall that the Empress, after arriving in Taganrog, "suddenly began to recover", which does not fit well with the serious heart disease she was supposed to be suffering from. They also refer to an excerpt from a letter written by the Empress, in which she writes about her husband: "...as long as he stays here, and I will stay here; and when he goes, I will go too, if it is possible. I will follow him as long as I am able to follow him" — contradicting her own words, the Empress stayed in Taganrog for another four months, taking this as an indication of her supposedly "posthumous" fate.

Even in the months after the tsar's death, Elizabeth Alexeievna was able to give orders and attend funeral services, which, in the opinion of the supporters of the legend, indicates that her health was by no means so deplorable as it was reported to St. Petersburg Logvinov.

=== The legend and Vera the Silent ===
Those who believe in the legend of the Empress Elisabeth's disappearance from the world and her appearance as a reclusive Vera, find confirmation of the noble origin of the Empress in the following words and deeds of the Empress:

- "Judged heavenly, I am the dust of the earth; judged earthly, I am above you" (said Vera in Valdai prison in 1838);
- "I am dust, I am ground, but my parents were so rich that I took out gold by the handful to give to the poor; I was baptized on the White Banks" (said during a fever attack during her first year in the convent);
- “You think my name is Vera? No, I'm not Vera, I'm Lisa” (said at the time and place mentioned before);
- In the last years of her life, her cell mistress asked Vera to give her parents' names so that she could write to them in the event of her death. In response, Vera pointed to the icon of the Savior, picked up a stick and a stone, and tilted the stick toward the stone several times, pretending to bow before it.
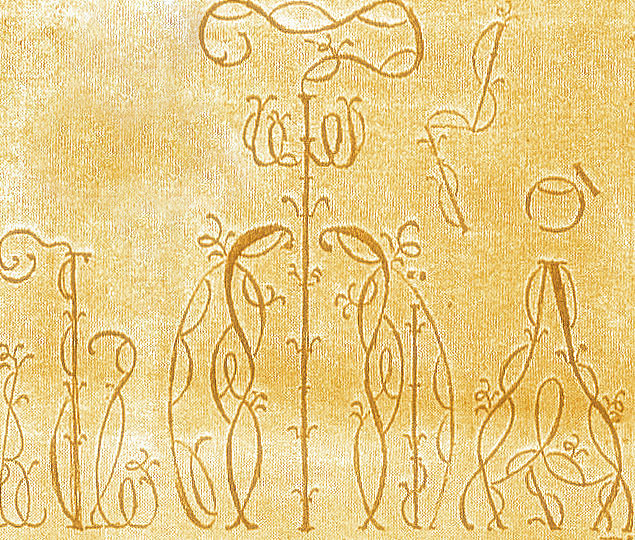
  Vera the Silent's cryptographic note with monograms
  They also believe that the very name "Vera Alexandrovna" contains her true origin in a coded form and actually means "the faith ("vera" means "faith" in Russian, including religious faith) of Tsar Alexander".

Moreover, in the memorial book of Countess Orlova-Chesmenskaya, who took the most direct part in the fate of Vera Molchalnitsa, the names of Emperor Alexander I and his wife are missing, which seems to be an indirect proof that the countess was privy to the secret of her disappearance. Also, in the ecclesiastical books of Elizabeth Alexeevna were found records, which prescribed after her death (as supporters of the legend — imaginary) to send some things from her wardrobe to one of the Novgorod monasteries. There is also an opinion about the external resemblance of the Empress and the nun, which is rejected by the opponents of the legend.

In favor of Vera's aristocratic origin, legend's followers cite evidence of her education and knowledge of painting. Also on the basis of the notes preserved after her they conclude that she was not of Russian origin (the Empress Elisabeth Alexeevna was German). On the excerpts from the Holy Scriptures preserved after her in large numbers there are monograms with the letters A, P and E in various combinations (for example, AP, EA), which some researchers consider to be the monograms of the Emperor Alexander Pavlovich and his wife Elizabeth. Monograms are always carefully written, and often next to the letters AP (deciphered as Alexander Pavlovich) there is a postscript "Tsar (Father) and my God are you". One of the sentences in Vera's notes is taken as a reference to her escape through an imaginary death: "Miracles are you, with the dead in the coffin I will be put to death". The notes of Vera the Silent Woman were kept in the archives of the Syrkov monastery, with which the monastery priest N. Gruzinsky worked at the beginning of the 20th century. Attempts to decipher the notebook with Vera Alexandrovna's notes and her individual notes in the 20th century suggested that they were a guide to the practice of the Jesus prayer, i.e. Hesychasm. For example, among Vera Alexandrovna's notes there is the following discourse on prayer:

Every virtue, but especially prayer, must be practiced with great diligence. Our soul prays with such diligence when it overcomes anger. Those who are diligent in prayer should be merciful. By this virtue, monks will gain a hundredfold. But others will gain something else: prayer that enters the human heart is kindled by the fire of heaven. As soon as it is kindled and rises to heaven, the same fire descends with it to the upper chamber of our souls.

== Pros and cons ==
The legend of Vera the Silent is based on the strange circumstances of the Empress Elisabeth Alexeevna's death, in which researchers see a number of ambiguous moments.

=== The official version of Elizaveta Alexeevna's death ===
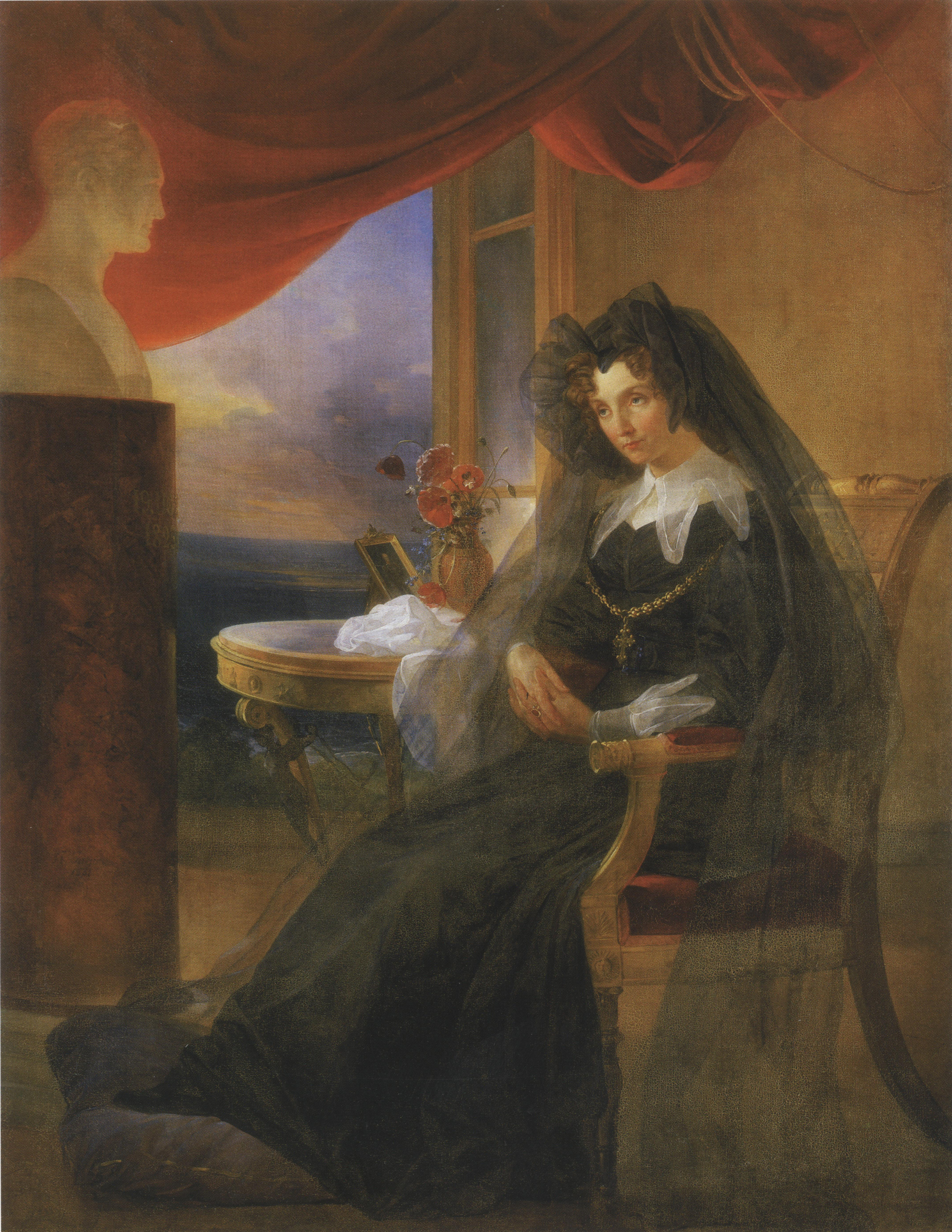
Elizabeth Alexeevna in mourning

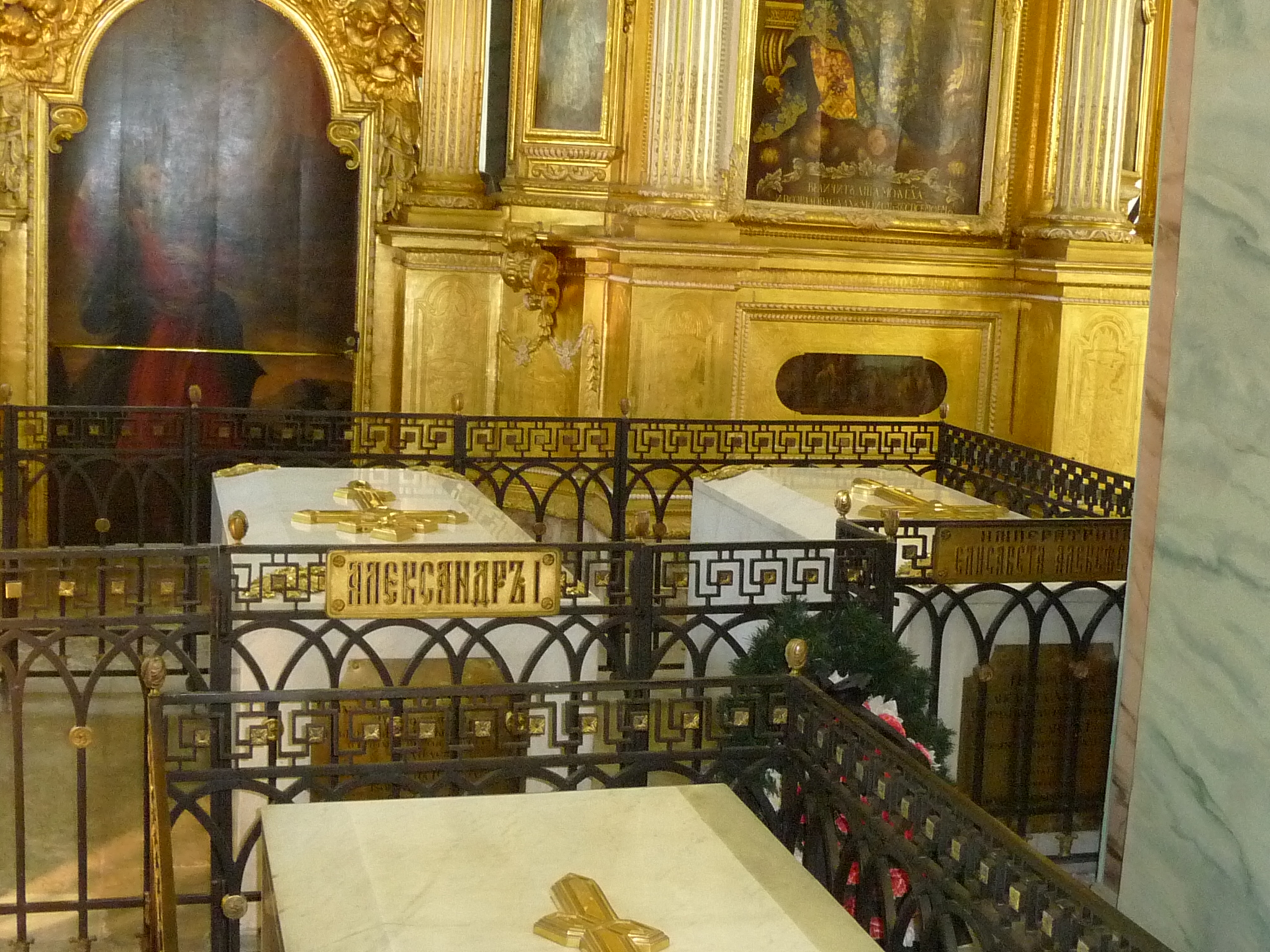
The tombs of Alexander I and Elizabeth Alexeevna in the Peter and Paul Cathedral

According to the official version in 1825 after the death of her husband on November 19 (December 2) in Taganrog, the Empress, staying in the city for another four months, finally decided to return to St. Petersburg. Elizabeth Alexeevna at that time was already seriously ill, suffering from heart failure, which was expressed in constant pain and shortness of breath. Her health was constantly deteriorating, which was reported to St. Petersburg by her secretary N. M. Longinov and Prince P. M. Volkonsky, who was in charge of her entourage. The latter reported in St. Petersburg to the new Tsar Nicholas I and Empress Dowager Maria Feodorovna that Elizabeth Alexeevna ordered “to move the traveling church in the room where the late Emperor died, it can easily be that the memory of the sad incident produces this effect on Her Majesty,” adding also that “the Empress torments herself with memories”. Worried about the health of his daughter-in-law, Nicholas I gave the right to decide on the time of her return to St. Petersburg accompanied by her medics and entourage. It was decided to wait until the weather settled and the rains stopped. In April 1826, the temperature rose to 18 degrees, the road dried up, and the departure from Taganrog was scheduled for the 22nd day. The state of health of the Empress continued to cause concern, so it was decided to move slowly, with a long stop in Kaluga on May 3. The Empress Maria Feodorovna left to meet her daughter-in-law.

However, due to the Empress's ill health she had to move more slowly and on May 3, 1826 at 8 o'clock in the evening she stopped for the night in Belyov, a town 90 versts away from Kaluga. Here the Empress stopped at the merchant Dorofeev's, where a cot was set up for her. The same night (May 4 (17) 1826) she died. A few hours later, Maria Feodorovna arrived in the city.

The autopsy report of the empress's body, written by her personal physician, Konrad von Stofregen, has been preserved. In particular, it states that:

After this careful examination, it turned clear that Her Majesty's long and painful sufferings had their origin in the pathological structure of the heart, which had completely disturbed the equilibrium of the blood circulation. The part of this noble organ that receives the venous blood was so stretched and weakened that it could no longer perform its function, which is to push the blood it receives forward by means of contractions. The destruction of the walls finally made this function impossible. The complete cessation of blood circulation must have been the immediate consequence of this fact and at the same time the cause of the sudden death.

The body of the deceased was carried through Torzhok, Vyshny Volochok, Tosno and Chudovo. The funeral train went directly to the Chesmensky Palace in St. Petersburg, where it arrived on May 13. For the funeral, the empress received a rather modest sum of 100 thousand rubles — probably because some of the materials left over from her husband's funeral were used for the burial.

On June 14, 1826 the funeral cortege set off from the Chesmensky Palace to the Peter and Paul Cathedral. A witness of the procession, General Vagenmeister A.D. Solomko, later recalled:

At the entrance of the sad chariot, many people wept... At the beginning of the day, the sun was shining, but as the funeral procession was moving, the clouds became thicker and it even began to rain. — It should be remembered that on the day of the entrance of the body of the late Tsar Alexander I it was snowing and the weather was cloudy. Nature takes part in the common mourning.

The body of the empress was taken to the cathedral for the farewell of the people and on June 22 it was buried. The tomb of Elizaveta Alexeevna is located in the Cathedral of Peter and Paul, next to the tomb of her husband, Emperor Alexander I.

=== An alternative version of the Empress' death ===
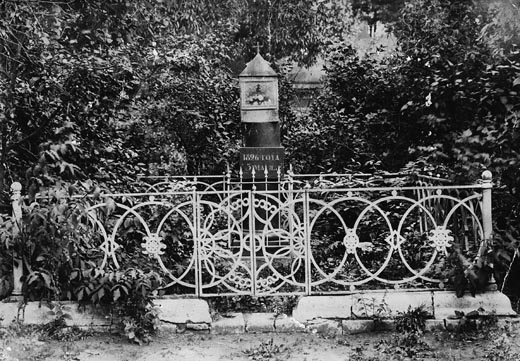
Monument in Belyov on the place of burial of Elizaveta Alexeevna's entrails

Soon after the empress's death, a rumor spread in St. Petersburg, probably started by her maid of honor, Varvara Mikhailovna Volkonskaya, "an old maid with great oddities", which was ironized by Alexander Pushkin, who dedicated an ironic epigram to her.

According to the story, Princess Volkonskaya, who suffered from insomnia, saw how some people carried the Empress out into the garden and drowned her in a pond, and the maid of honor, who had sneaked in after them, almost immediately raised the alarm, woke the servants, but it was impossible to bring the Empress back to life. This rumor has never been confirmed. The researcher L. Vasilieva, trying to find evidence for it, argued that the Empress Elizabeth was supposedly a danger to Nicholas and his mother with her "left views" (among others, in her entourage was the Decembrist revolt F. N. Glinka), and therefore they hurried to get rid of her. She saw additional evidence of this in the fact that Nicholas and his mother hastened to destroy the diary and other personal papers of the deceased; she also seemed suspicious of Maria Feodorovna's too "hasty trip" to meet her daughter-in-law. In addition, it is said that the Empress was "secretly buried in Belyovo", where the old inhabitants showed her grave to the curious for a long time. In this statement there is a clear error: in the garden of the merchant Dorofeev there was a crypt in which were buried the internal organs removed from the body of the empress during embalming.

This version is also contradicted by the fact that during the new reign the empress's confidants were not disgraced, for example, her personal secretary N. M. Logvinov became a real Privy Councillor, a senator, who was entrusted with numerous responsible tasks, including abroad.

=== Other versions of Vera the Silent's identity ===
A different version from the above was presented in the study of K. V. Kudryashyov, who studied the family archive of N. S. Mayevsky. S. Mayevsky. According to the received data, under the name "Taciturna" hid Vera Alexandrovna Butkevich, daughter of the Catherine nobleman Major General Alexander Dmitrievich Butkevich and Anna Ivanovna von Moller, his second wife. Butkevich's estate, Milokhovo, was located near Novgorod, near the village of Koloma. The father of the future nun served under Alexander Suvorov, in particular, in 1794 he took part in the battle for Warsaw. He scandalously divorced his wife, leaving her with two daughters practically at the mercy of fate. On both girls experienced shock affected quite severely. The elder, Catherine, who was married to Count Stroynovsky, then by second marriage to E. V. Zurov, is believed to have ended her life in one of the local monasteries and was buried in Nalyucha. The fate of the youngest daughter is unknown. According to Kudryashyov, Mayevsky learned from his dying mother Lubov Aleksandrovna Butkevich, General Butkevich's daughter from his third marriage, that Vera, a silent woman, was in fact his aunt.

Nikolai Lerner suggested that Ekaterina Butkevich and her younger sister were the prototypes of Tatiana and Olga Larina in Alexander Pushkin's novel Eugene Onegin.

Vera Molchalnitsa also saw some stepdaughters of Emperor Alexander I, as well as the Grand Duchess Anna Feodorovna (wife of Konstantin Pavlovich, with whom he was divorced in 1820), as well as the collateral daughter of Emperor Paul I from the luminous Princess Anna Lopukhina. The latter assumption was made by Count Mikhail Tolstoy, who visited Vera in 1860.

== Veneration ==
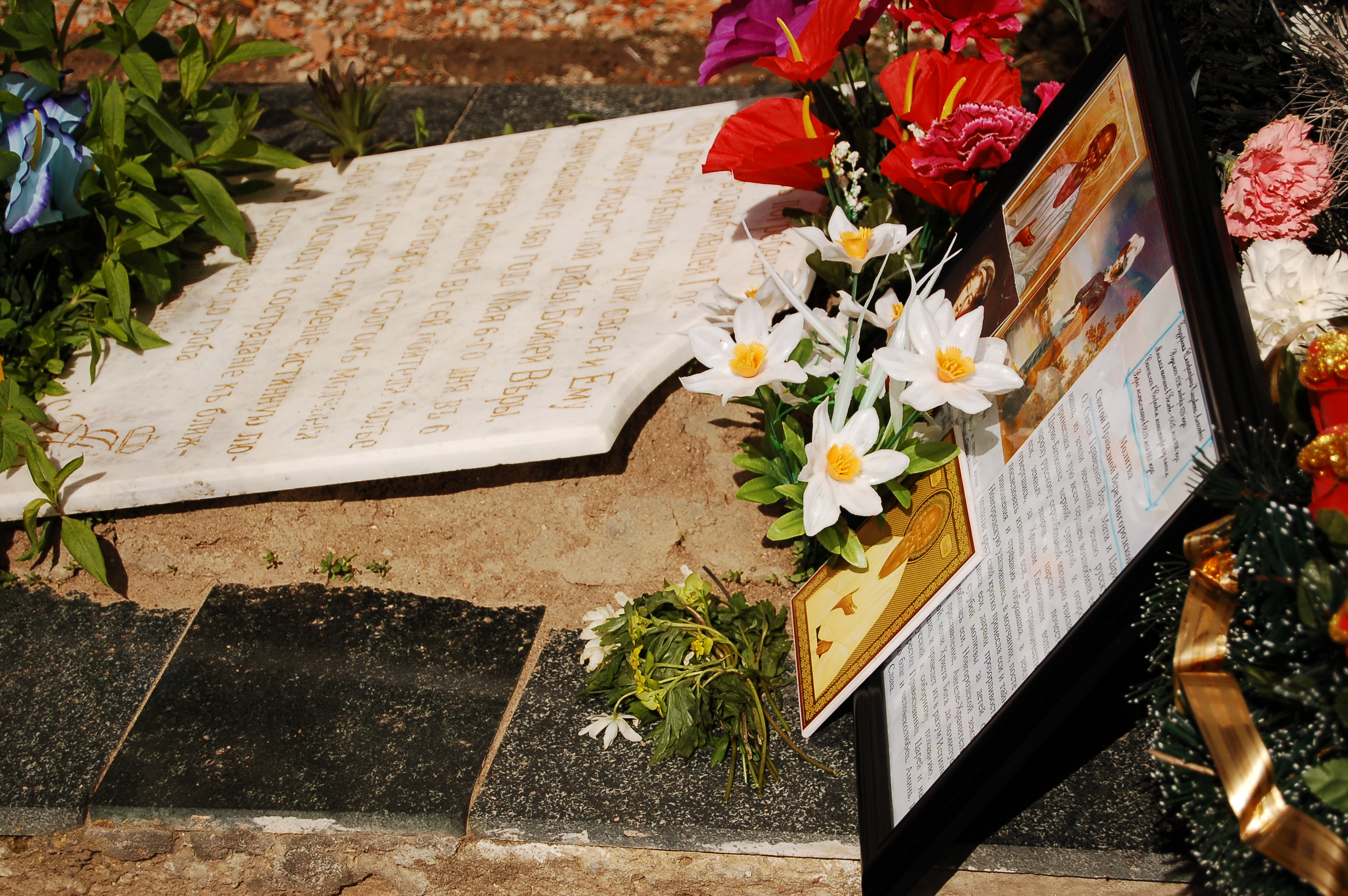
The cenotaph of Vera the Silent with icons of Feodor Kuzmich and portraits of Empress Elizaveta Alexeevna installed by her devotees

Local people associate Vera Alexandrovna's tomb in the Syrkov Monastery with the legend of miracles performed there. It is said that the nun was famous for several miraculous healings during her lifetime, and after her death they continued at her tomb. In particular, it is believed that a flower plucked from the mound gives comfort and hope, and the number of flowers does not decrease no matter how many pilgrims pluck them. It is also believed that Vera Molchalnitsa especially helps parents who pray for their children, appearing to them in dreams in the form of a silent woman in dark clothing and inviting them to make a pilgrimage to the Syrkov Monastery, which is a sign that their prayers will be heard. A troparion and prayer were also created for St. Righteous Vera of Novgorod, who was not officially declared a saint, but is venerated by some Orthodox groups. Specifically, the troparion says:

Having loved Christ with all your heart, you followed Him, in silence, fasting and prayer you meekly bore your cross and kept the secret of the Tsar's land of Novgorod a glorious adornment and glorification, Holy Righteous Faith pray to Christ God that He may have mercy on the people of Russia and lead them to repentance and restore the throne of the Orthodox kings and bless His people with peace.

== Sources ==
The main biographical about Vera the Silent is an article by John Lebedev, a priest of the Syrkov Monastery, who was her confessor for 15 years. The article was published in the July issue of the magazine Strannik for 1868, i.e. 7 years after her death. In 1895 the magazine Russian Pilgrim published an article about Vera, which was later published in a separate booklet by the Novgorod researcher P. M. Silin, with a photograph of the portrait of the hermit of Syrkovo. The spiritual writer Eugene Pogozhev (Poselyanin) in his work on Russian spiritual ascetics of the 19th century (published in 1900) devoted a separate chapter to Vera Alexandrovna. A similar biography was included in one of the pamphlets of the Trinity under the title An Example of Saviorly Silence.

All these works do not support the idea of the identity of Vera and the Empress Elizaveta Alexeevna. This version is mentioned for the first time in the review of the Grand Duke Nikolai Mikhailovich's work Empress Elizaveta Alexeevna, the Wife of Emperor Alexander I (1909), written by the historian E. Shumigorsky denies any reality of this story and writes: "As for the silent Vera in the Novgorod Syrkov Monastery, her name is already known: it is Vera Alexandrovna Butkevich, daughter of Major General Pavlov, chief of the Belozersk infantry regiment".

The largest study of the history of Vera Molchalnitsa was written in 1909 by Nikolai Gruzinsky, a priest of the Novgorod Syrkov Monastery. In addition to biographical information about Vera Alexandrovna, he gives his conclusions from her notes kept in the monastery archives (a large number of separate notes and a notebook written in a kind of cipher). In his work he repeatedly tries to prove the identity of the hermitess of Syrkovo and the Empress Elisabeth Alexandrovna.

The Soviet historiography did not study the history of Feodor Kuzmich and Vera Molchalnitsa, folk legends, if they were published, were presented briefly and, as a rule, accompanied by references to the works of previous years. Modern works about Vera the Silent also consist of retellings of pre-revolutionary publications and do not contain new information and hypotheses.

== In literature ==
The mystery of Vera the Silent became the subject of Elena Grushko's novel The Silent Shadow. (Louise Elizabeth Alexeevna and Alexander I).

== See also ==
- Feodor Kuzmich

== Bibliography ==
- Грузинский, Н. (1911). Вера Молчальница (in Russian). p. 16.
- Лебедев, И. (1868). Девица Вера Александровна Молчальница (in Russian). СПб.: Странник. pp. 95–116.
- Мордвинов, И. П. (1918). Исторические загадки. Молчальница Вера // Тихвинец (in Russian). Странник. pp. 16–19.
- Погожев Е.П. (Евгений Поселянин) (1910). Молчальница Вера Александровна // Русские подвижники XIX века (in Russian). pp. 169–176.
- Силин, П.М. (1895). Молчальница Вера Александровна (in Russian). p. 27.
- Цеханская, К. В. (1999). Мнимая смерть Императрицы? Или история монастырской Молчальницы Веры Александровны (in Russian). Наука и религия. pp. 20–23.
- Цеханская, К. В. (2004). Вера Александровна (in Russian). Vol. 7. М.: Православная энциклопедия. pp. 696–697. ISBN 5-89572-010-2.
