= Elizabeth Alexeievna (Louise of Baden) =

Empress of Russia from 1801 to 1825

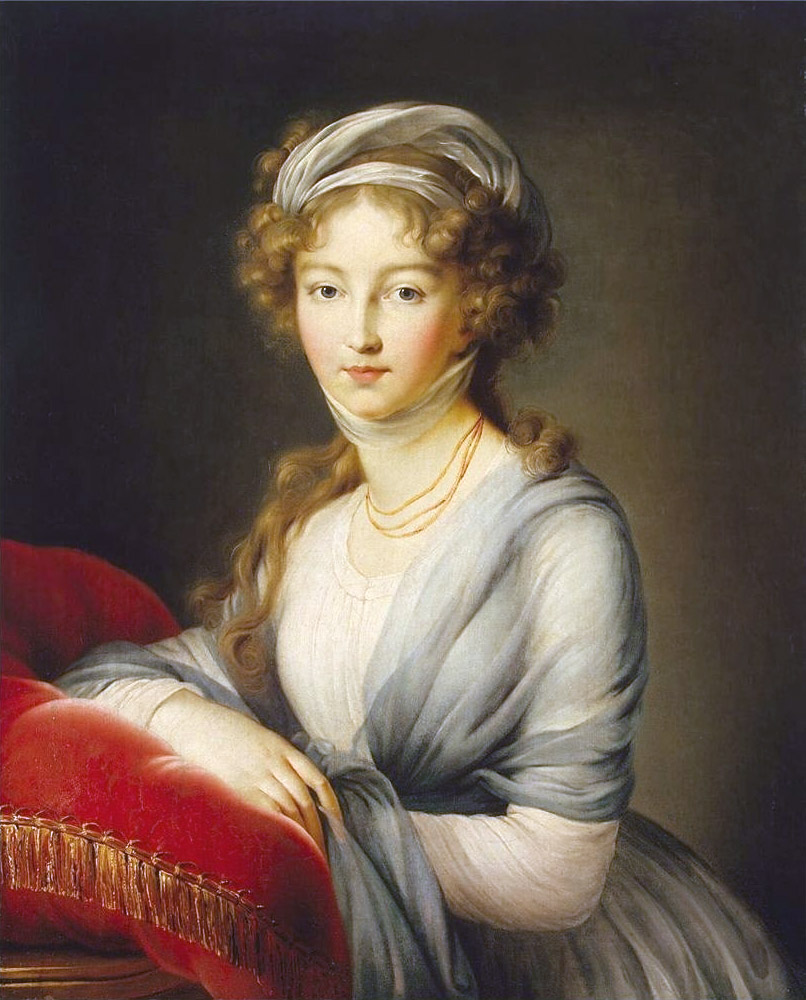
- Portrait by Madame Le Brun, 1795. The Empress later sent this portrait as a gift to her mother.

Empress consort of Russia
- Tenure: 24 March 1801 – 1 December 1825
- Coronation: 15 September 1801
- Born: Princess Louise Marie Auguste of Baden; 24 January 1779; Karlsruhe, Margraviate of Baden, Holy Roman Empire
- Died: 16 May 1826 (aged 47); Belyov, Russian Empire
- Spouse: Alexander I of Russia (m. 1793; died 1825)
- Issue: Grand Duchess Maria; Grand Duchess Elizabeth
- House: Zähringen
- Father: Charles Louis, Hereditary Prince of Baden
- Mother: Princess Amalie of Hesse-Darmstadt

Elizabeth Alexeievna (Russian: Елизавета Алексеевна, romanized: Elizaveta Alekseyevna; 24 January [O.S. 13 January] 1779 – 16 May [O.S. 4 May] 1826), born Princess Louise of Baden (German: Luise Marie Auguste von Baden), was Empress of Russia during her marriage to Emperor Alexander I.

== Princess of Baden ==
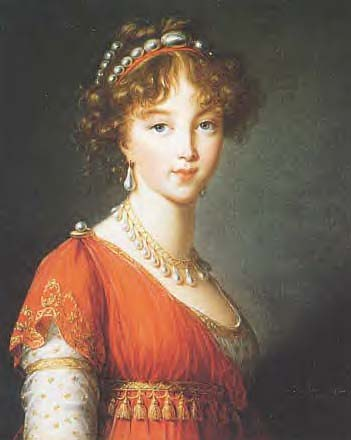
Elizabeth Alexeievna, praised for her beauty, would not find happiness in her marriage or fulfillment in her position in Russia

Elizabeth Alexeievna was born in Karlsruhe, on 24 January [O.S. 13 January] 1779 as Princess Louise Maria Auguste of Baden of the House of Zähringen. She was the third of seven children of Charles Louis, Hereditary Prince of Baden, and his wife, Landgravine Amalie of Hesse-Darmstadt. At birth, the child was so small and weak that doctors feared that she would not live.

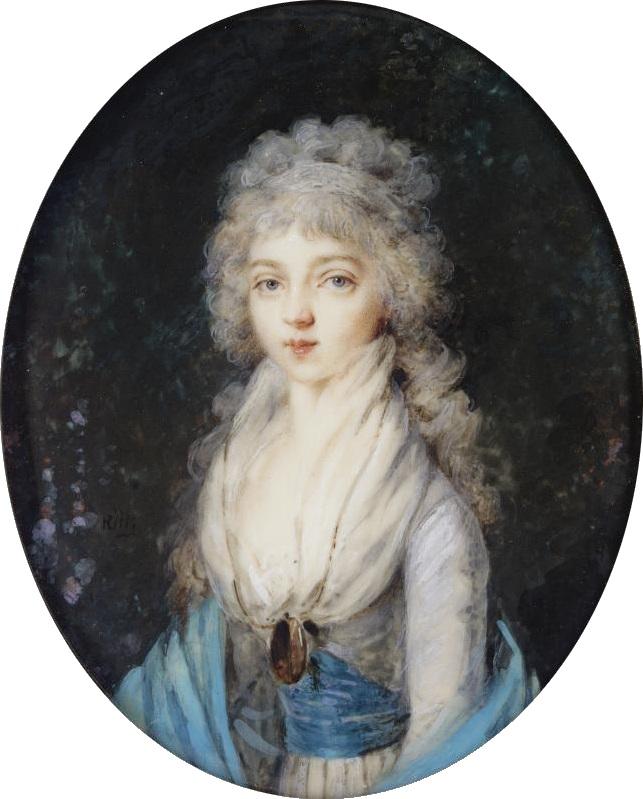
Louise of Baden in childhood, gouache and watercolour on ivory, Augustin Ritt, 1791

Louise grew up in a close, warm family environment. She would remain particularly attached to her mother, with whom she maintained an intimate correspondence until her death (the Margravine of Baden outlived her daughter). She received a thoughtful education at the Baden court. She spoke and wrote both in French and German; studied history, geography, philosophy, and French and German literature. Thanks to the close proximity between Baden and France, she was well acquainted with French culture and refinements, as was the custom of that era. Because her grandfather, the reigning margrave of Baden, was not rich, the family lived modestly by royal standards.

Catherine the Great was looking for a bride for her eldest grandson, the future Alexander I, and set her eyes on the princesses of Baden who were the nieces of Queen Frederica Louisa of Prussia and the deceased Grand Duchess Natalia Alexeievna (Wilhelmina Louisa of Hesse-Darmstadt) who had been the first spouse of Tsesarevich Paul. Thus, an alliance to Prussia and several German royal houses they were closely related to would be a beneficial outcome. After favorable impressions, Catherine invited Princess Louise and her younger sister Frederica, who later became Queen of Sweden, to Russia. In the autumn of 1792, the two sisters arrived in St. Petersburg.

The Empress was delighted by Louise, finding her a model of beauty, charm, and honesty. Louise herself was attracted to Alexander; he was tall and handsome. At first, Alexander was shy with his future bride — very young and inexperienced, he did not know how to treat her — and she mistook his reserve for dislike. However, the young couple soon grew fond of each other. "You tell me that I hold the happiness of a certain person in my hands", she wrote to Alexander. "If that is true, then his happiness is assured forever… this person loves me tenderly, and I love him in return, and that will be my happiness… you can be certain that I love you more than I ever can say", she added. They were engaged in May 1793.

The Princess learned Russian, converted to the Orthodox Church, took the title of Grand Duchess of Russia and traded the name Louise Maria Auguste for Elizabeth Alexeievna. The wedding took place on 28 September 1793. "It was a marriage between Psyche and Cupid", Catherine wrote to the Prince of Ligne. Elizabeth was only fourteen, her husband a year older.

== Grand Duchess of Russia ==
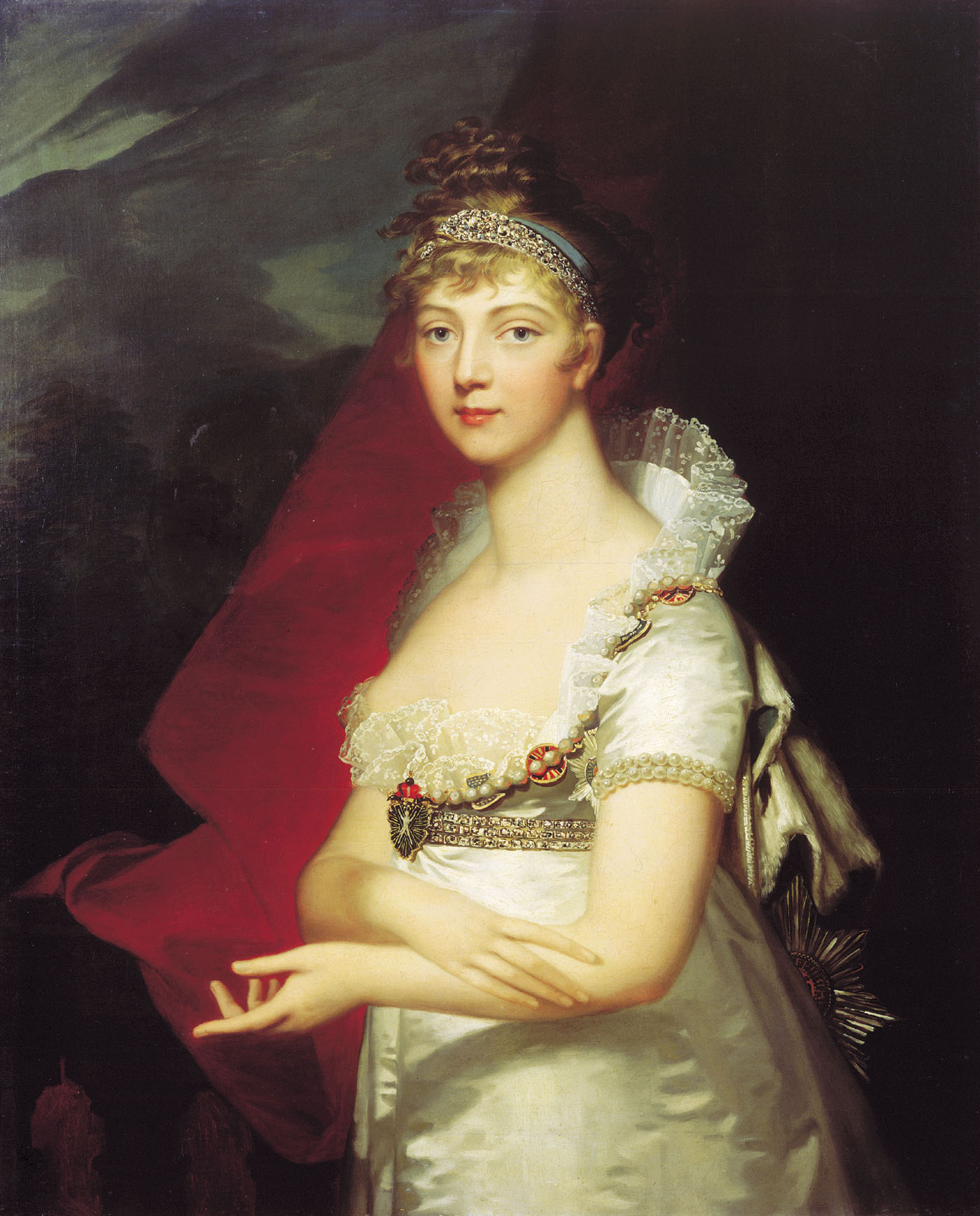
Elizabeth Alexeievna, by Jean-Laurent Mosnier

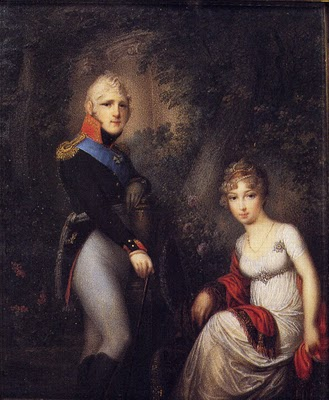
Alexander and Elizabeth

=== Relationship with Catherine II ===
Although Elizabeth Alexeievna initially found the grandeur, elaborate etiquette and political intrigues of the Russian imperial court difficult to adjust to, she developed a close and affectionate relationship with Catherine II. According to Countess Varvara Golovina, the empress regarded Elizabeth with particular tenderness and admired her beauty, grace and accomplishments. Catherine also appreciated Elizabeth's musical talents, especially her singing. The historian Igor Zimin, citing Natalia Ogarkova's research into music at the imperial court, records Catherine's enthusiastic assessment:

Grand Duchess Elizabeth is a true Siren; her voice goes straight to the heart, and she has completely captivated mine.

Elizabeth took music lessons from Giuseppe Sarti and frequently participated in amateur concerts, sometimes singing duets with Golovina. The private life of Catherine's court also included informal entertainment, outdoor games and excursions. Golovina recalled that Catherine arranged races on the lawns at Tsarskoye Selo and watched the participants from a bench. Elizabeth, who was particularly agile, outran the other women. On another occasion, while Elizabeth was stroking Catherine's small greyhound, the empress accidentally placed her hand on Elizabeth's. The grand duchess kissed it and replied: "If it was an accident, then I bless the accident." According to Golovina, Catherine was delighted by the remark and spoke of Elizabeth with special affection.

Despite the formal hierarchy of the imperial court, Catherine allowed the young couple considerable freedom in their private recreation. Golovina wrote that the empress wished to see her grandchildren happy and encouraged them to enjoy walks, games and excursions. Catherine also demonstrated consideration for Elizabeth's personal privacy. During a visit to the Alexander Palace, she asked the grand duchess's permission before showing her private apartments to visiting courtiers. In June 1796, Catherine arranged for Golovina to occupy rooms close to Elizabeth's and expressed concern for the happiness of her marriage:

I hope she is pleased with me; I do everything I can to please her. I have given her the handsomest young man in the whole empire. [...] Tell me, do they really love one another, and are they happy with one another?

Elizabeth's close relationship with Catherine II aroused the jealousy of her mother-in-law, Maria Feodorovna, who also resented her intimate friendship with Countess Varvara Golovina. Maria attempted to undermine the friendship by portraying Golovina to Elizabeth and Alexander as a dangerous intriguer. The unusually close attachment between the two women attracted suspicion among Maria's associates. Their meetings, conversations and private interactions were closely monitored by courtiers, who reported their observations to Maria through Count Saltykov.

Elizabeth nevertheless remained deeply attached to Golovina and resisted attempts to separate them. In 1795, she insisted that the countess accompany her and Alexander on an excursion to Kronstadt, declaring that she would derive no pleasure from the journey without her friend. Maria attempted to prevent Golovina from participating, but Catherine personally intervened, questioning who had presumed to forbid her from accompanying Elizabeth and declaring that she would herself ensure that Golovina received the consideration she deserved. Elizabeth was delighted by the intervention, and the two women subsequently made the journey together.

Elizabeth also became the object of unwanted romantic attentions from Catherine's favourite, Platon Zubov. His attempts to approach the young grand duchess were facilitated by Countess Shuvalova and other courtiers, while Elizabeth found herself increasingly embarrassed by his conduct. Rumours subsequently circulated that Catherine had encouraged Zubov's pursuit of Elizabeth in the hope of obtaining a great-grandchild. Contrary to these allegations, Catherine personally confronted Zubov over his inappropriate behaviour in late 1795 and compelled him to abandon his advances towards Elizabeth.

In June 1796, Catherine arranged for Golovina to occupy apartments close to Elizabeth's in the Alexander Palace, allowing the two women to maintain their friendship. The empress also expressed particular concern for the happiness of Elizabeth's marriage to Alexander. On 9 June, she explicitly reassured Golovina of her confidence in her integrity despite the intrigues surrounding the young couple:

I know, Countess, that you are not someone who would destroy a family's happiness. I have seen everything; I know more than some suppose. My favour towards you therefore remains unchanged.

Catherine continued to show affection and protection towards Elizabeth and Golovina until her death in November 1796.

Elizabeth retained an enduring affection for Catherine after her death in November 1796. In a later letter to her mother, she recalled the late empress's reign:

I confess that I always like to return in thought to the reign of Empress Catherine; and although I experienced only four years of it, at an age when one reflects very little, that period has remained for me a model, a pattern, a standard by which I involuntarily measured everything.

=== Relations with Paul I and Maria Feodorovna ===
The death of Catherine in November 1796 brought Elizabeth's father-in-law Paul I to the Russian throne. During the years of his reign, Elizabeth avoided Paul's court. She utterly disliked her father-in-law and disapproved of the injustices of his government and the bluntness of his character.

Following Catherine II's death in 1796, Elizabeth became increasingly dissatisfied with the restrictions imposed on the young imperial couple under Paul I and Maria Feodorovna. In letters to her mother, she complained of the compulsory attendance, elaborate dress and ceremonial obligations enforced by her mother-in-law. On 29 June 1797 (Old Style), she contrasted these arrangements with the relative freedom she had enjoyed under Catherine:

Under the late Empress, the chains appeared gilded to some eyes; we were a little freer and undoubtedly had fewer vexations and more amusements. But if the whole world cannot now see that they are made of iron, then the whole world must simply be blind.

Golovina's account also describes Maria's attempts to control her daughters-in-law's daily lives. According to a passage from her memoirs published in 1918, Maria required Elizabeth and Anna Feodorovna to remain constantly in her company and, while staying at Pavlovsk, even to sleep in her apartments. Golovina associated these restrictions with Elizabeth's deteriorating health and her eventual need for a period of seclusion.

Elizabeth also strongly condemned Paul's punishments of military personnel and the conduct of Maria Feodorovna during his outbursts. In a letter to her mother dated 4/15 August 1797, she described a disturbance involving the palace troops:

The enraged Emperor, with his sword drawn, rushed towards a hussar officer, struck his horse and shouted, "Back, scoundrel!" [...] The Emperor was angry and agitated; the Empress even more so, crying out that this was insolence and demanding punishment. The Emperor returned with his sons to the barracks of his battalion. In a terrible fit of rage, he ordered two soldiers to be beaten immediately, before his very eyes. Heaven knows why, he slapped a non-commissioned officer who said he did not know who had run out first. He then deprived officers of their ranks, although he soon relented. [...] Oh, if only someone could take the lead! He is simply a tyrant, dear Mama; and she [...] commits fresh follies every time.

The historian A. N. Shebunin identified strong anti-autocratic sentiments in Elizabeth's early correspondence and observed that she encouraged Alexander's critical attitude towards the political environment under Paul.

The Grand Duchess felt lonely and homesick, particularly after her sister Frederica returned to Baden. Elizabeth was abandoned in an alien world where she could never be herself, even among her servants and ladies-in-waiting. The relationship with Alexander was her only source of solace. "Without my husband, who alone makes me happy, I should have died a thousand deaths"

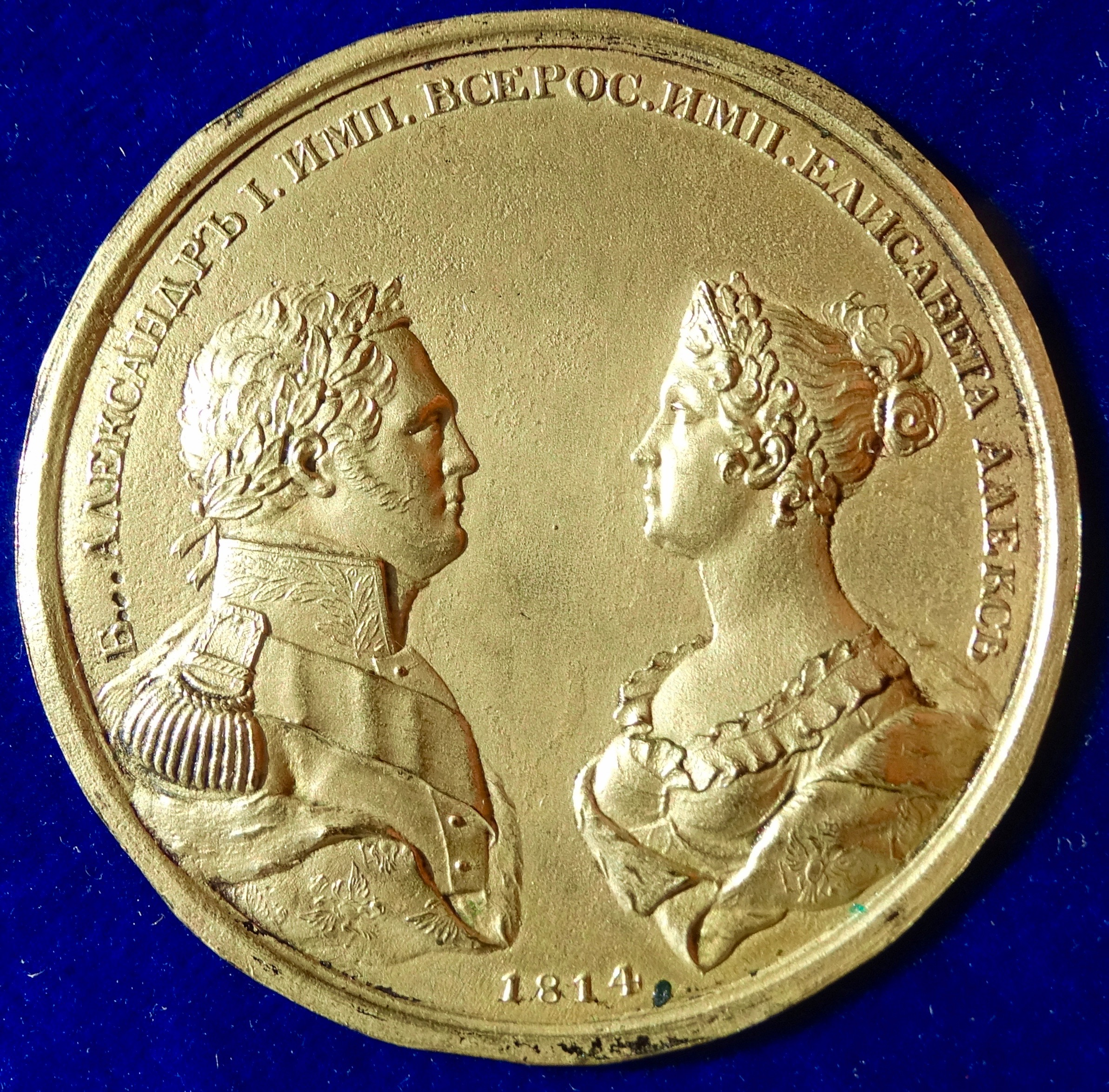
Elizabeth Alexeievna with Alexander at the Congress of Vienna 1814 Cliché (medal by Leopold Heuberger)

The first cracks in Elizabeth's marriage began to appear. She did not find fulfillment for her romantic nature in a husband who neglected her. Elizabeth looked for emotional solace elsewhere. She first found refuge for her loneliness in a close intimate friendship with the beautiful Countess Golovina. Later, she started a romantic liaison with Alexander's best friend, the dashing and clever Polish prince, Adam Czartoryski. Their relationship lasted for three years.

After more than five years of a childless marriage, on 29 May 1799, Elizabeth gave birth to a daughter, Grand Duchess Maria Alexandrovna. At court, some attributed the paternity to the Polish prince. The child had black hair and dark eyes. At the baptism, Tsar Paul I did not fail to express his amazement that the two blonde and blue-eyed parents had a dark-haired child. Elizabeth Alexeievna soon lost both her lover and her daughter. Adam Czartoryski was sent on a diplomatic mission, and Elizabeth's baby daughter did not live long. "As of this morning, I no longer have a child, she is dead" she wrote to her mother on 27 July 1800. "Not an hour of the day passes without my thinking of her, and certainly not a day without my giving her bitter tears. It cannot be otherwise so long as I live, even if she were to be replaced by two dozen children."

The Tsarevna maintained a close friendship with Grand Duchess Anna Fyodorovna, who had married Alexander's younger brother, Constantine. The Grand Duchess was constantly mistreated by her husband, although she maintained a close relationship with the Tsarevna. Her husband Grand Duke Alexander continually sought out his sister-in-law, a situation that began to strain the siblings' marriages. In 1802, Anna Fyodorovna left the Russian court.

== Personality and appearance ==
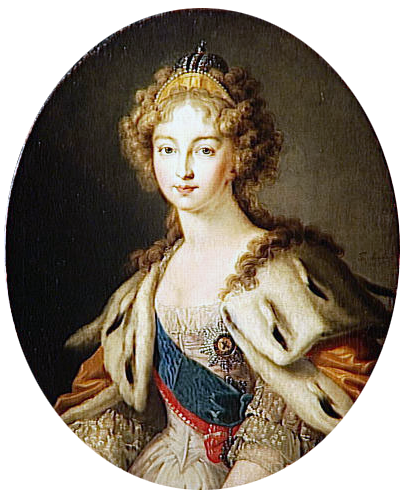
Empress Elizabeth by Vladimir Borovikovsky, 1813. Russian poet Alexander Pushkin dedicated her his poem "I wasn't born to amuse the Tsars" (я не рожден царей забавить...)

Elizabeth Alexeievna had a soft voice and an oval face with delicate features; a Greek profile, large almond-shaped blue eyes and curly ash blond hair, which she usually left floating on her shoulders. With an elegant figure, regal carriage, and an angelic face, contemporaries regarded her as one of the most beautiful women in Europe.

Elizabeth Alexeievna loved literature and the arts. She took music lessons from Ludwig-Wilhelm Tepper de Ferguson (1768–after 1824). Unfortunately, she possessed a shy, withdrawn personality which failed to endear her to either the Russian court or her in-laws. She preferred simplicity and solitude to the pomp and ceremony of life at court.

Her marriage also failed to bring her fulfillment. Although Elizabeth Alexeievna loved her husband, and encouraged him in many personal and political crises, Alexander neglected her. Their relationship was harmonious, but emotionally distant, with each engaging in love affairs outside their marriage.

== Russian Empress ==
The eccentricities of Paul I led to a plot to overthrow him and place Alexander on the Russian throne. Elizabeth was well aware of this scheme and on the night of Paul's assassination, she was with her husband giving him support.

Once Alexander became emperor, Elizabeth Alexeievna encouraged him to leave behind the trauma of Paul I's murder and dedicate himself to serve Russia. As Empress Consort, she took part in court life and the duties of representation, but the first female rank in the empire was reserved for her mother-in-law Empress Maria Feodorovna. During official events, Maria walked next to the Emperor while Elizabeth was forced to walk alone behind them.

Alexander treated his wife indifferently, he was polite toward her in public ceremonies and made an effort to have his meals in her company. Elizabeth was said to be too soft and placid to keep a hold on a restless and soul tortured man such as her husband. In 1803, Alexander began a love affair that would continue for more than fifteen years with the Polish Princess Maria Naryshkina, wife of Prince Dmitri Naryshkin. Maria Naryshkina flaunted her liaison at court in a tasteless, blatant fashion.

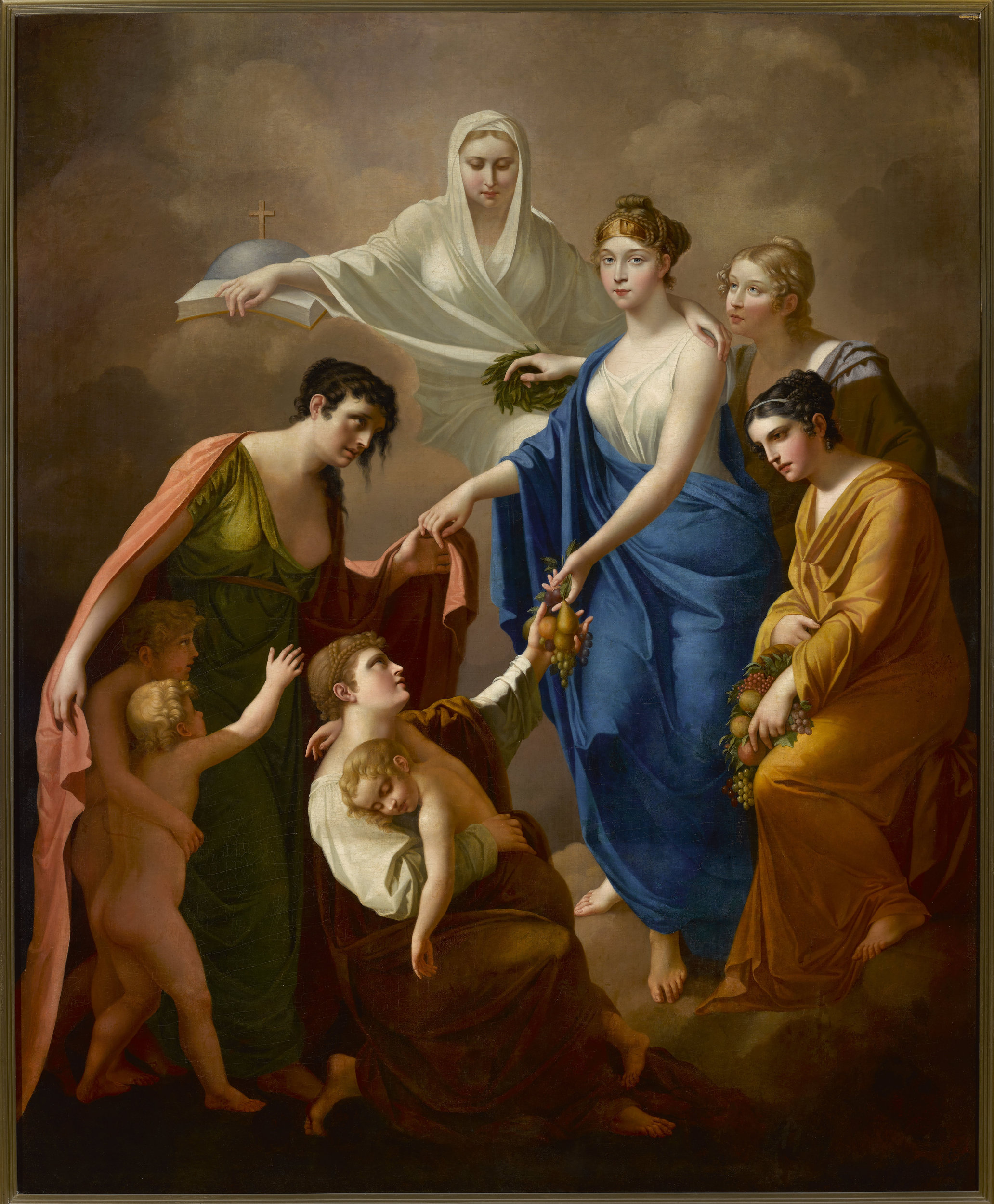
Apotheosis of Empress Elizabeth Alexeievna (1813) by Józef Oleszkiewicz: National Museum in Warsaw

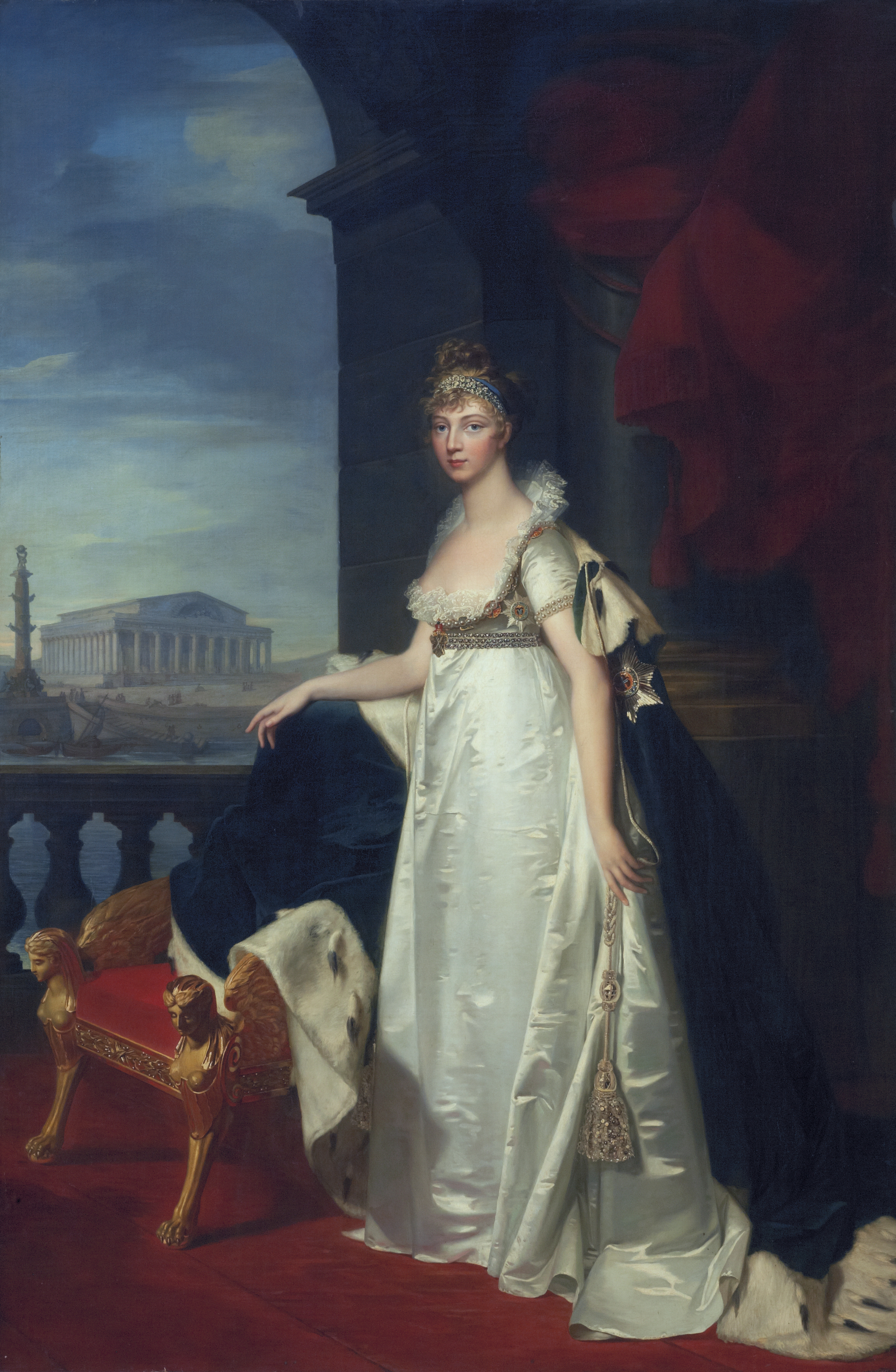
Portrait of Elizabeth Alexeievna (1805) by Jean-Laurent Mosnier: The Chelyabinsk State Museum of Fine Arts

Elizabeth, for her part, found solace in her relationship with Prince Adam Jerzy Czartoryski, who had returned to Russia at Alexander's ascension to the throne. This liaison ended when she started a love affair with a handsome staff captain, Alexis Okhotnikov. All the correspondence between Elizabeth and Alexis Okhotnikov, and some of her diaries were destroyed by Emperor Nicholas I after her death.

The affair with Okhotnikov had a tragic end. The staff captain, who suffered from tuberculosis, retired due to his worsened health and died in 1807. It was apparently rumored later that Alexander or his brother Grand Duke Constantine had ordered him killed; in the early twentieth century Grand Duke Nicholas Mikhailovich turned those rumors into an elaborate legend for his biography of Elizabeth Alexeievna, although the chapter on Okhotnikov was not published at the time due to Nicholas II's personal intervention, and his other studies of that period.

On 16 November 1806, Elizabeth gave birth to a second daughter. There were rumors that the newborn, Grand Duchess Elizabeth Alexandrovna was not a child of Alexander but of Okhotnikov. After his death, Elizabeth Alexeievna felt more abandoned than ever and poured out all her affection on her daughter Elizabeth, "Lisinka". Fifteen months later, the little girl died suddenly of an infection blamed on teething. "Now," wrote Elizabeth to her mother, "I am not longer good for anything in this world, my soul has no more strength to recover from this last blow."

In 1807, Rev. London King Pitt, Chaplain to the British community in St. Petersburg, was appointed as Elizabeth's English Language Tutor, and she came to know his wife, Frances. After Rev. Pitt died of typhus in 1813, Frances returned to England with their son, but Elizabeth persuaded Frances to return to Russia to be a companion to her. A portrait of Elisabeth as a widow, executed for Frances in 1826 by George Dawe, Alexander's court painter, is now in the Royal Collection in London.

The death of their daughter temporarily brought Alexander and Elizabeth closer. Although Elizabeth Alexeievna was not yet thirty years old, neither she nor Alexander had further hopes of a family and they would have no more children.

During the Napoleonic Wars, Elizabeth Alexeievna was a reliable supporter of her husband's policies as she had been in other personal and political crises. After the fall of Napoleon, she joined her husband and many of the crowned heads of Europe in the Congress of Vienna (1814), where she was reunited with her old paramour, Adam Czartoryski. He was still in love with her and forgave her past infidelity with Okhotnikov. Their reunion was short-lived.

== Last years and death ==
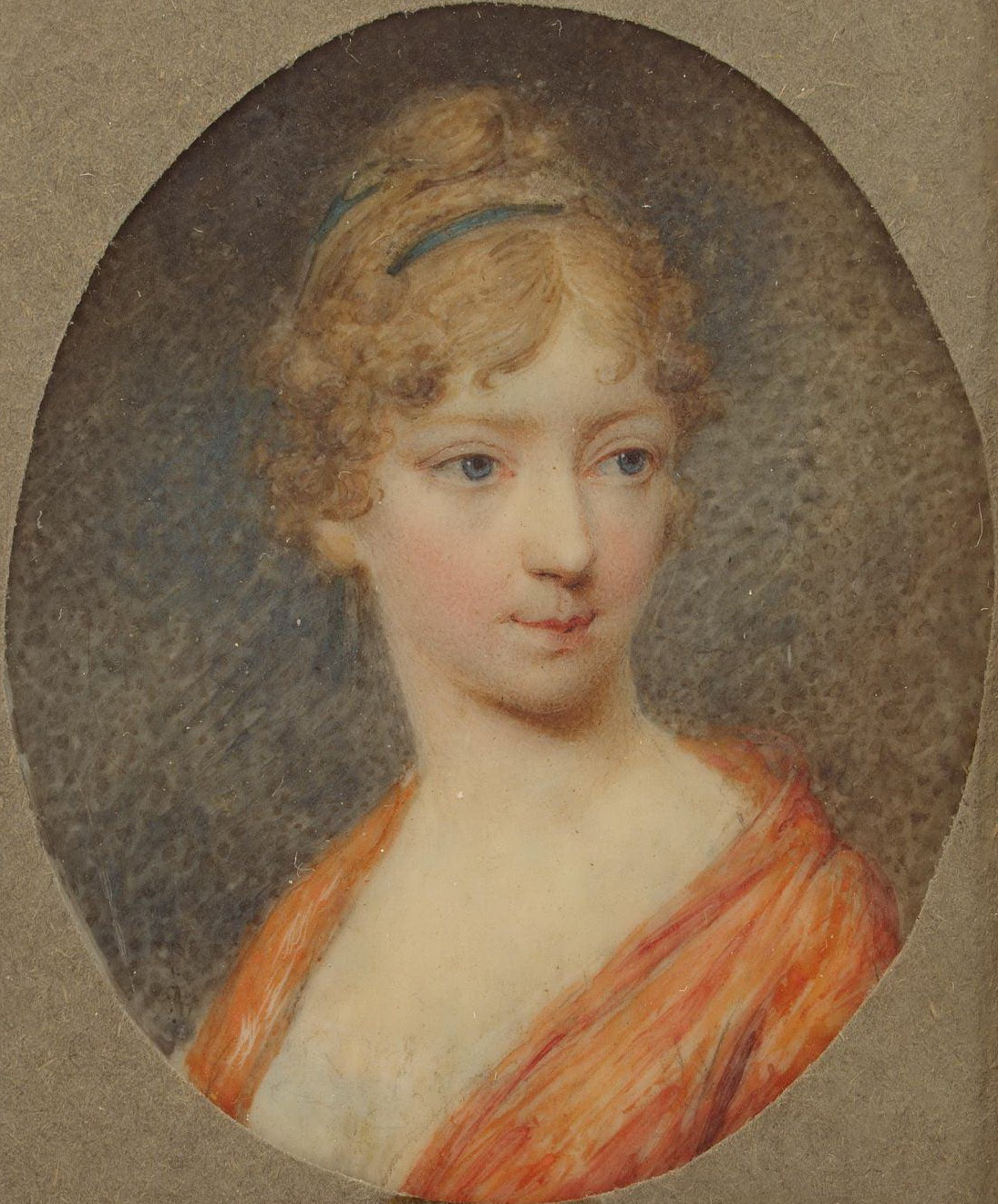
Portrait miniature of Empress Elizabeth Alekseevna in her later years (unidentified artist, c. 1810)

Once she reached forty, she left behind any romantic pretensions. Her husband also experienced a personal transformation that drove the couple closer than they ever were. In 1818, Alexander, became more devoted in Orthodox Christianity, broke his long relationship with Maria Naryshkina. From then on, the husband and wife started to spend more time together. The Empress sympathized deeply with him and Alexander found her supportive when he lost his beloved natural daughter Sophia. The marked reconciliation between the Emperor and the Empress caused general surprise. "I am reduced to thinking of myself sometimes as Alexander's mistress, or as if we had been married secretly..." Elizabeth wrote to her mother.

By 1825, Elizabeth Alexeievna's health was frail; she suffered from a lung condition and a nervous indisposition. The doctors recommended her to take a rest in a temperate climate and suggested the southern city of Taganrog by the Sea of Azov. With no comfortable palace, the imperial couple were established in a modest house in Taganrog by 5 October. They were happy together living in intimate simplicity. On 17 November 1825 Alexander returned to Taganrog from visiting Crimea with a cold, which developed into typhus, from which he died that December in the arms of his wife. Elizabeth was stricken by her loss, writing "I do not understand myself, I do not understand my destiny... What am I to do with my will, which was entirely subjected to him, with my life, which I loved to devote to him?"

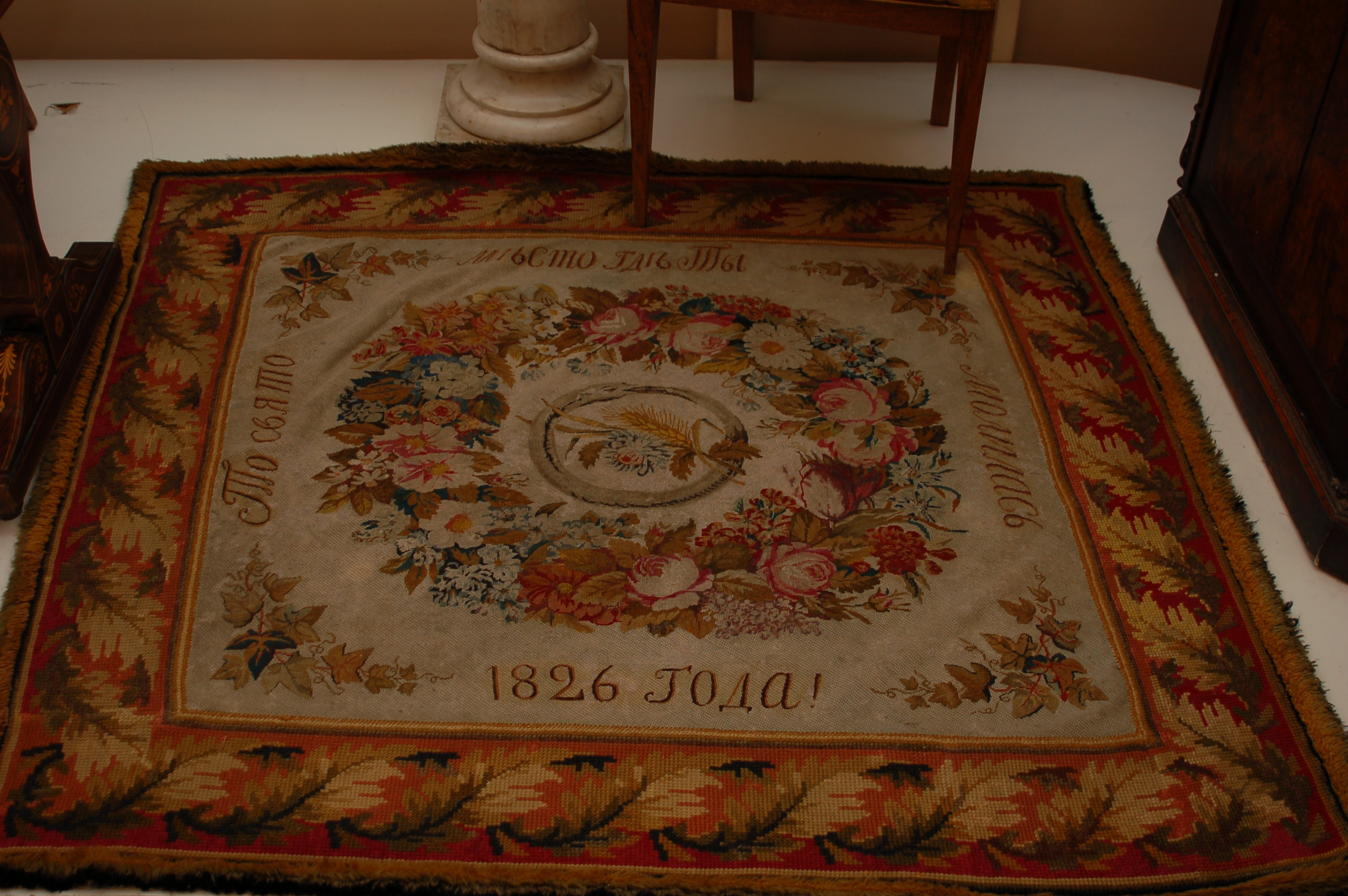
Carpet on which Elizabeth Alexeievna stood to pray after death of Alexander I of Russia from Alexander I Palace in Taganrog. "Blessed Be the Place where You Prayed. 1826!"

The now Dowager Tsarina was too frail to come back to St. Petersburg for the funeral. When Elizabeth Alexeievna finally started her return journey to the capital, she felt so sick that she had to stop at Belyov, Tula Governorate on the road to St. Petersburg, just a few hours before she was to meet her mother-in-law, who was coming south to greet her. In the early hours of 16 May 1826, towards 4.30 am, when her lady's maid went to check on the Empress, she found her dead in bed. Elizabeth Alexeievna had died of heart failure.

Three days after her husband's death Elizabeth had written her mother, "Do not worry too much about me, but if I dared, I would like to follow the one who has been my very life."

== Children ==
Alexander I and Elizabeth Alexeievna had two daughters, both of whom died in early childhood. Their common sorrow drew husband and wife closer together for a brief time.

- Grand Duchess Maria Alexandrovna of Russia (29 May 1799, St. Petersburg – 8 July 1800, St. Petersburg)
- Grand Duchess Elizabeth Alexandrovna of Russia (15 November 1806, St. Petersburg – 12 May 1808, St. Petersburg)

== Ancestry ==
Ancestors of Elizabeth Alexeievna (Louise of Baden)

8. Frederick, Hereditary Prince of Baden-Durlach
4. Charles Frederick, Grand Duke of Baden
9. Princess Amalia of Nassau-Dietz
2. Charles Louis, Hereditary Prince of Baden
10. Louis VIII, Landgrave of Hesse-Darmstadt
5. Princess Caroline Louise of Hesse-Darmstadt
11. Countess Charlotte of Hanau-Lichtenberg
1. Louise of Baden
12. Louis VIII, Landgrave of Hesse-Darmstadt (= 10)
6. Louis IX, Landgrave of Hesse-Darmstadt
13. Countess Charlotte of Hanau-Lichtenberg (= 11)
3. Princess Amalie of Hesse-Darmstadt
14. Christian III, Count Palatine of Zweibrücken
7. Countess Palatine Caroline of Zweibrücken
15. Countess Caroline of Nassau-Saarbrücken

== See also ==
- Vera the Silent

== Footnotes ==
Elizabeth Alexeievna (Louise of Baden) House of Zähringen Born: 24 January 1779 Died: 16 May 1826
Russian royalty
Preceded by Maria Feodorovna (Sophie Dorothea of Württemberg)	Empress consort of Russia; 1801–1825	Succeeded by Alexandra Feodorovna (Charlotte of Prussia)
