= Posthumous Notes of the Hermit Fëdor Kuzmich =

Short story by Leo Tolstoy

"Posthumous Notes of the Hermit Fëdor Kuzmich" ("Посмертные записки старца Федора Кузьмича") (AKA: "Posthumous Notes of the Elder Fëdor Kuzmich") is a short story by Leo Tolstoy written in December, 1905, and then only published in 1912, over the ferocious objections of the tsarist censors and two years after Tolstoy's death. It was never completed.

The preface of the work indicates that it is the fictional notes of the real hermit Feodor Kuzmich. Its translators were Louise Maude and Nigel J. Cooper. It is narrated from the point of view of Alexander I, who suddenly has a religious awakening and discovers that living the lavish, decadent lifestyle of an emperor was wrong and that it was time to live among the common people. According to Solomon Volkov, the theme here is a fictional death (the religious conversion) as a means of escaping one's former life.

== See also ==
- Bibliography of Leo Tolstoy
