= Feodor Kuzmich =

Russian saint (1776–1864)

Saint Theodore Kuzmich of Tomsk
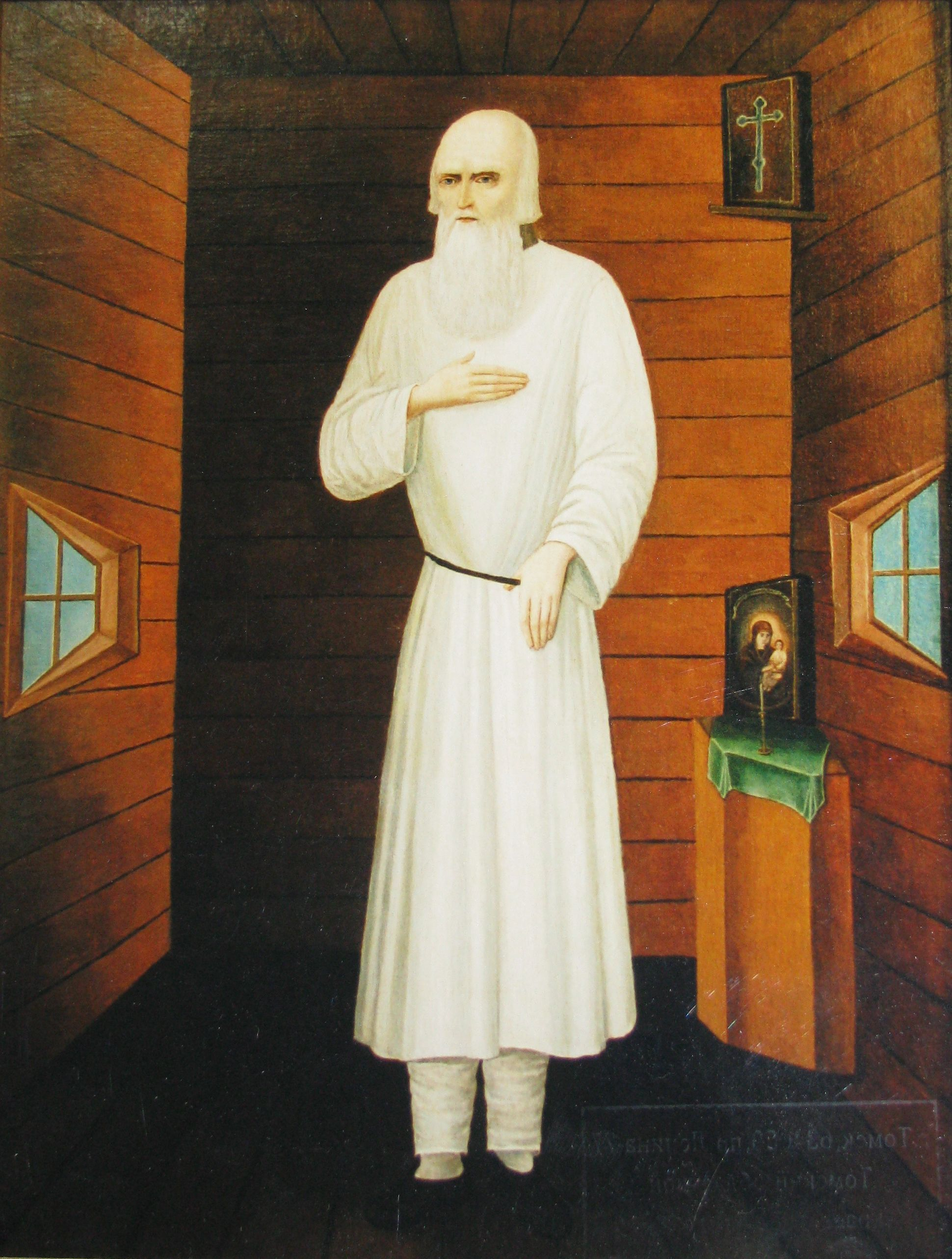
- Portrait made by Tomsk artist for Simeon Feofanovich Khromov. Regional Museum of Tomsk Oblast.

Hermit, Elder, Righteous, Wonderworker
- Born: 1776
- Died: February 1, 1864 (aged 87–88); Tomsk
- Venerated in: Eastern Orthodoxy
- Canonized: 1984 by Patriarch Pimen I, Russian Orthodox Church
- Major shrine: Tomsk
- Feast: 2 February (Old Calendar) and 5 July

Fyodor Kuzmich (Note: Also Feodor) (Russian: Фёдор Кузьми́ч; c. 1776 – 1 February 1864), also known as the Righteous Theodore of Tomsk, Siberian, elder (Church Slavonic: Пра́ведный Фео́дор Кузьми́ч То́мский, Сиби́рский, ста́рец, romanized: Pravednyy Feodor Kuzmich Tomskiy, Sibirskiy, starets) (Note: Or Fomich) was a Russian Orthodox starets. He was canonized as a righteous saint by the Russian Orthodox Church in 1984. There are many variations of a legend that claims that he was Alexander I of Russia who faked his death in 1825 to become a hermit. The question is still pending between historians.

== Biography ==
There are no accounts of Feodor Kuzmich's early life. The first reported incident involving Feodor Kuzmich occurred on 4 September 1836, in Krasnoufimsk of the Province of Perm riding on a "snow-white horse" harnessed on a cart. Because he had no records, nor had any background, this caused suspicions from a local blacksmith with his behavior and evasive answers. He later reported him to the authorities.

The old man was detained as a tramp; there were traces of whip blows on his back, and he did not have any documents with him. On September 10, his case was considered by the court: the detainee called himself sixty-year-old Feodor Kuzmich Kozmin (after that, this surname, like any other, was never called an elder), could not name his origin. By age, he was unfit to give back to soldiers and therefore, as a tramp, he received 20 whip blows and was exiled to Siberia. Fyodor Kuzmich was satisfied with the sentence, but asked the bourgeois Grigory Shpynyov to sign for him, stating that he himself was illiterate (although subsequent facts indicate the opposite).

On October 13, 1836, with the 43rd batch of exiles, he was sent in stages to the Bogotolsky parish of the district of Mariinsky, in the province of Tomsk. During the journey through the stage, he attracted prisoners and escorts to himself, showing care for the weak and sick. The elder was the only prisoner who was not shackled. In the materials of the Tomsk expedition about exiles, a description of Fyodor Kuzmich's appearance has been preserved.

In the document, His height was described as 2 arshin and 6 with 3/4 verst. (Approximately 172 centimeters, or almost 5’8) Other parts of the description included “hair on the head and beard light blond with graying, round chin, on the back - traces of beatings with a whip.”

On March 26, 1837, a party of exiles arrived in Tomsk, from where Fyodor Kuzmich was sent further to the place of exile. The elder was attributed to the village of Zertsaly, but was settled at the Krasnorechensky distillery, where he lived for five years. Due to his age, the elder was not involved in forced labor. It is known that the local Cossack Semyon Sidorov, seeing the elder's tendency to privacy, built him a cell-hut in Beloyarskaya.

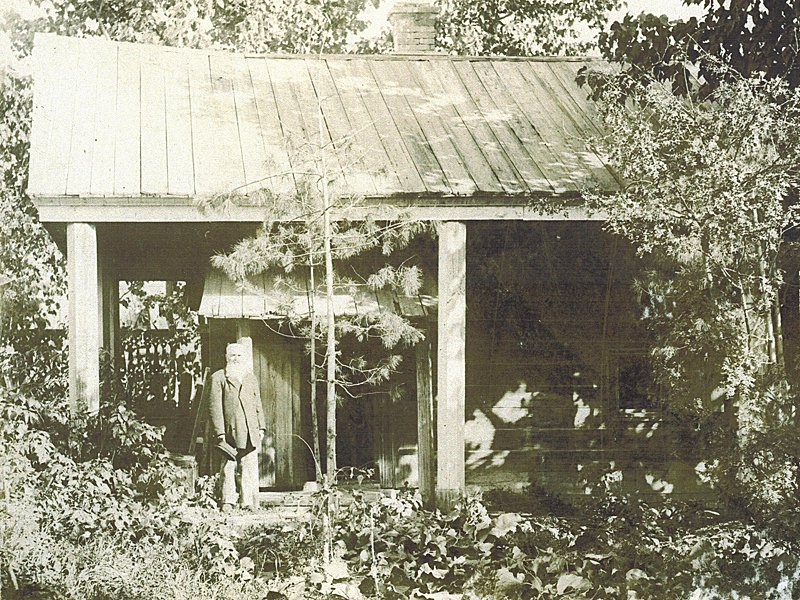
Kuzmich's house

According to his life's history, Feodor Kuzmich lived a life of rigor, sleeping on a bare board and wearing only simple clothes. Due to Feodor Kuzmich's strange appearance and mannerisms, residents assumed that his previous life was quite different from his present. Before and after his death many miracles were attributed to Feodor Kuzmich. When asked about his previous life, Feodor Kuzmich responded:

"Why do you usually think that my situation is worse now than it was once before? At the present time I am free, independent, and, most importantly, – easy-going. Before, my peace and happiness depended on many conditions: it was necessary to take care of my loved ones enjoying the same happiness as I did, so that my friends would not deceive me ... Now there is nothing of this except what will always remain with me – except the words of my God, except for the love of the Savior and neighbor. Now I have no grief and disappointment, because I do not depend on anything earthly, nor on anything that is not in my power. You do not understand what happiness is in this freedom of the spirit, in this unearthly joy. If you would restore me to the former position and make me again the guardian of earthly wealth, perishable and now altogether unnecessary to me, then I would be an unhappy man. The more our body is pampered and groomed, the more our spirit becomes weaker. Every luxury relaxes our body and weakens our soul."

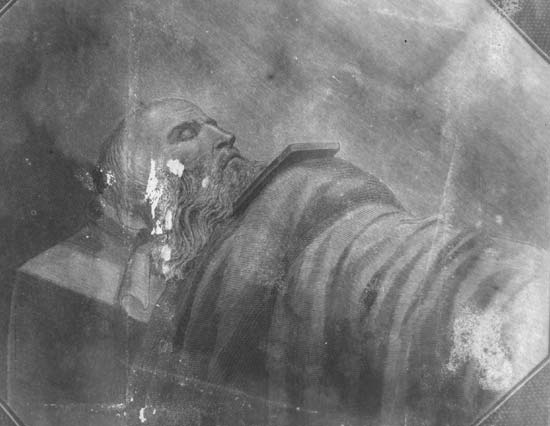
The death of Feodor Kuzmich

Upon his death, Feodor Kuzmich's grave was visited by prominent people such as the Grand Duke Alexei Alexandrovich and Nicholas II.

In 1984, Feodor Kuzmich was canonized as a saint by Patriarch Pimen I of the Russian Orthodox Church.

== Rumors of a previous life ==
According to one account, he lived in a modest house with a garden; protected in a variety of ways by the Imperial Chancery, he received a visit from Tsarevich Alexander in 1837 and his grave was visited by Tsarevich Nicholas in 1893. Rumors of Alexander's tomb being empty have persisted since 1866. According to legend, Alexander's tomb has been opened four times, with the latest happening in 1921 when Soviet authorities allegedly opened his tomb in search of valuable metals. In each case it was reported that the tomb was empty or exhibited signs of tampering.

"Even when monk Feodor Kuzmich was alive – he came to Siberia in 1836 and lived for 27 years in various places there – there were strange rumours about him that he was hiding his real name and position and that it was Emperor Alexander I. After the monk's death these rumours only spread and became stronger. Not only common people believed them but many from the elite, including the royal family of Tsar Alexander I"

— Tolstoy's "Posthumous Notes of the Elder Feodor Kuzmich"

It is suspected that Alexander I would have faked his death due to feelings of guilt about his father Paul I's death, and he faked his death to abdicate his throne and seek forgiveness for allowing his father to be killed. Prominent visitors include Innocent of Alaska, Father Peter Popov, and Bishop Athanasius of Irkutsk. In addition, Feodor Kuzmich is reported to have known French and spoke about life in Saint Petersburg and Moscow, as well as speaking about prominent people as if they were his friends.

Feodor Kuzmich discussed in detail Metropolitan Philaret, as well as intimate details about the war of 1812. By this time, there were many rumors that Feodor Kuzmich was in fact Alexander I. On his deathbed, the priest reportedly asked him if he was in fact the Alexander the Blessed. In response, Feodor Kuzmich said, "Your works are wonderful, Lord ... There is no secret, which is not opened."

== Support for the legend ==
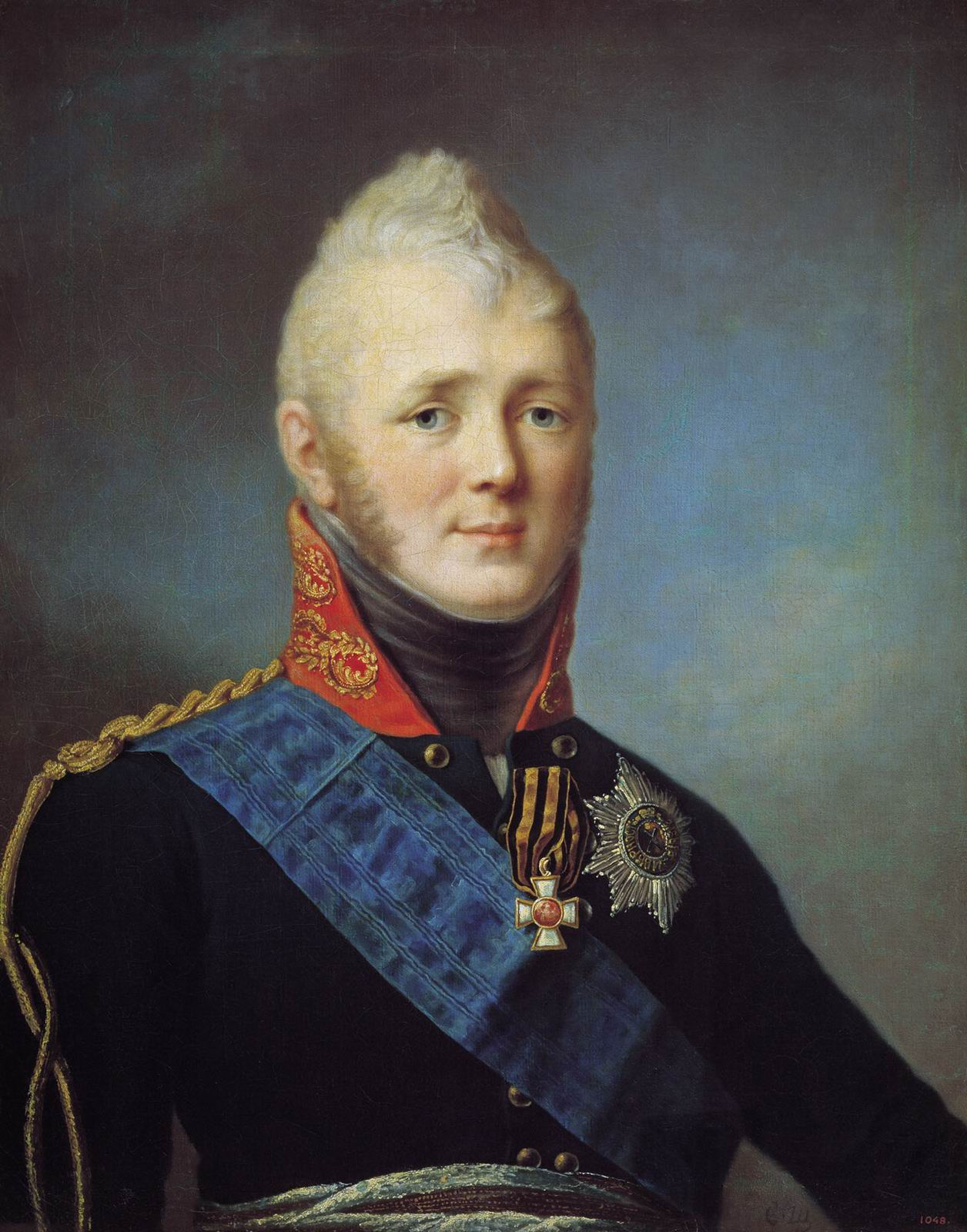
Alexander I of Russia

Among some of reasons supporting the belief that Alexander I faked his death are curious similarities between Alexander and Feodor Kuzmich. Svetlana Semyonova, president of Russian Graphological Society, analyzed both Alexander's and Feodor Kuzmich's handwriting and concluded that they are the same. Furthermore, there are rumors that Alexander's wife also faked her death a year after Alexander's death and became a nun in Saint Petersburg.

In his work Posthumous Notes of the Hermit Fëdor Kuzmich, author Leo Tolstoy referred to the legend when he wrote:

"After the monk's death these rumours only spread and became stronger. Not only common people believed them but many from the elite, including the royal family of Tsar Alexander III. The reasons for these rumours were the following: Alexander died unexpectedly, he did not suffer from any disease before, he died far away from home in a remote place of Taganrog, and when he was put in the coffin many who saw him, said that he changed a lot, this is why the coffin was quickly sealed. It was known that Alexander said and wrote that he wanted so much to leave his post and to stay away from this world."

== Canonization ==
In the beginning of 20th century a chapel was built over his tomb.

In 1984 his name was added to Russian Church Menologium by Patriarch Pimen I, next year on 5 July 1985, his relics were translated and a new chapel was built.

His feast days are:

- 10 June (Saints of Siberia)
- 20 January (Day of death, Siberia)
- 22 June (Translation, Diocese of Tomsk)
