= A Dame's School =

Painting by Thomas Webster

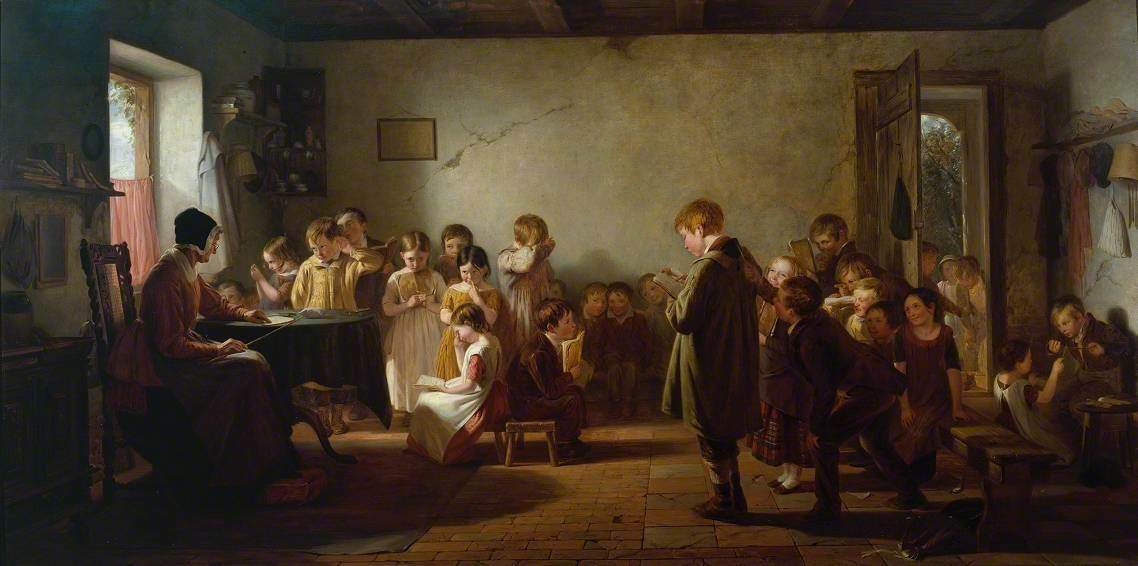
- Artist: Thomas Webster
- Year: 1845
- Type: Oil on mahogany, genre painting
- Dimensions: 121.9 cm × 62.2 cm (48.0 in × 24.5 in)
- Location: Tate Britain, London

A Dame's School is an 1845 oil painting by the British artist Thomas Webster. It depicts the interior of a Dame school in an English village. Such places were where young boys and girls could receive a basic education, in this case overseen by an elderly teacher.

Webster specialised in such genre paintings of everyday life, later becoming associated with the Cranbrook Colony which focused on such pictures. The painting was displayed at the Royal Academy Exhibition of 1845 held at the National Gallery in London. It was acquired by the businessman and art patron Robert Vernon. Today it is part of the collection of Tate Britain, having been presented to the nation as part of the Vernon Gift in 1847.

== Bibliography ==
- Nicholson, Graham & Fawcett, Jane.The Village in England: History and Tradition. Rizzoli, 1988.
- Prochner, Larry. A History of Early Childhood Education in Canada, Australia, and New Zealand. University of British Columbia Press, 2010.
- Rose, Clare. Children's Clothes Since 1750. Batsford, 1989.
- Thompson, Carol (ed.) The Cranbrook Colony: Fresh Perspectives. Wolverhampton Art Gallery, 2010.
