= Royal Academy Exhibition of 1845 =

1845 art exhibition in London

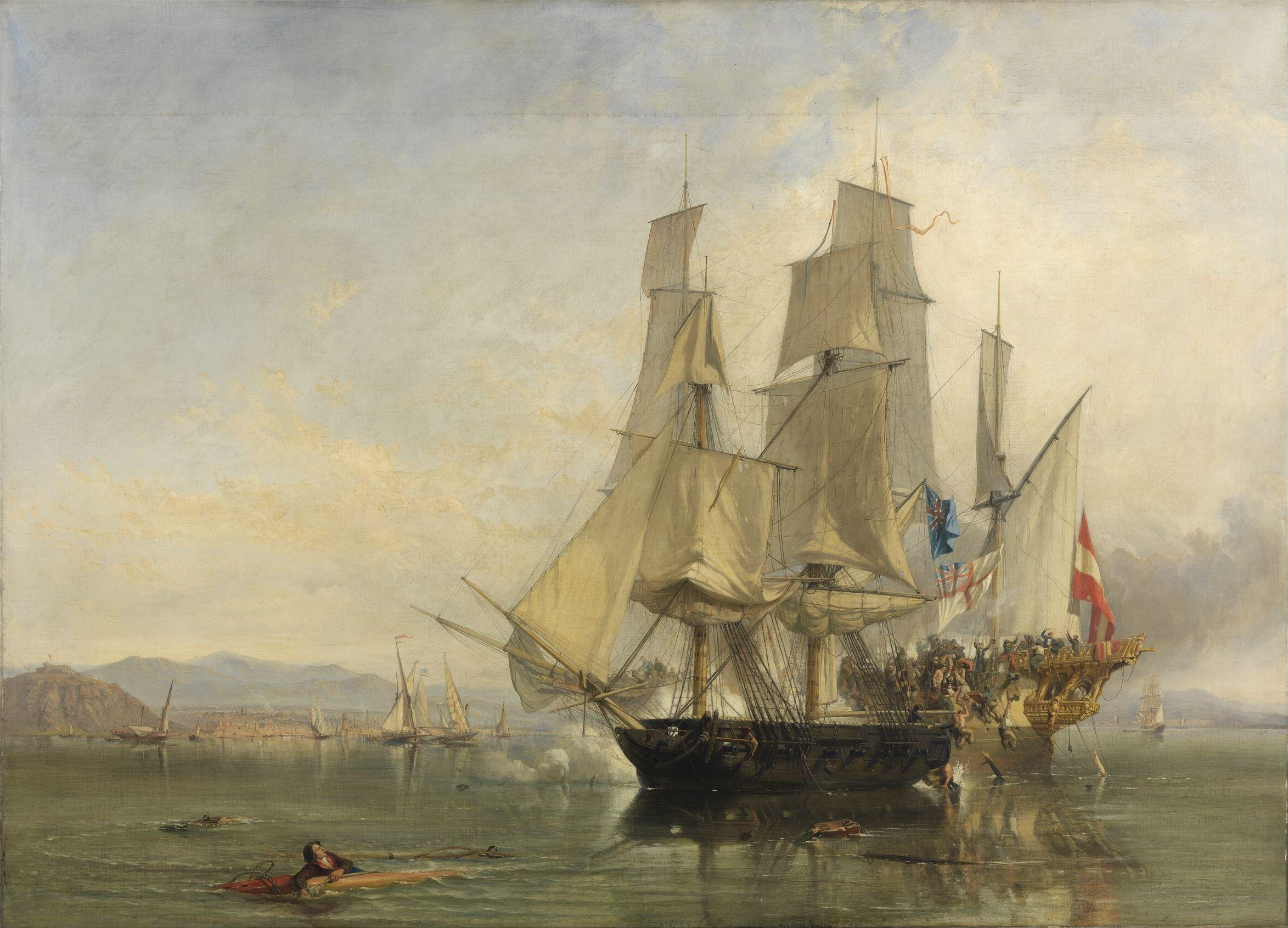
The Capture of the El Gamo by Clarkson Stanfield

The Royal Academy Exhibition of 1845 was the seventy seventh annual Summer Exhibition organised by the British Royal Academy of Arts. It was held at the National Gallery in London between 5 May and 26 July 1845 and featured submissions from notable artists and architects from the early Victorian era.

J.M.W. Turner submitted a number of paintings including a number depicting views of Venice. He also displayed two paintings featuring scenes of whaling, probably with the hope of selling them to his patron Elhanan Bicknell who was involved in the trade. Richard Redgrave enjoyed success with his genre painting The Governess.

Clarkson Stanfield displayed The Capture of the El Gamo, a depiction of a naval engagement during the French Revolutionary Wars. In addition he submitted his landscape Trajan's Arch, Ancona. Francis Grant displayed several fashionable society portraits including one of the Anglo-Irish aristocrat the Marquess of Londonderry.

== Gallery ==
The United Service by Andrew Morton

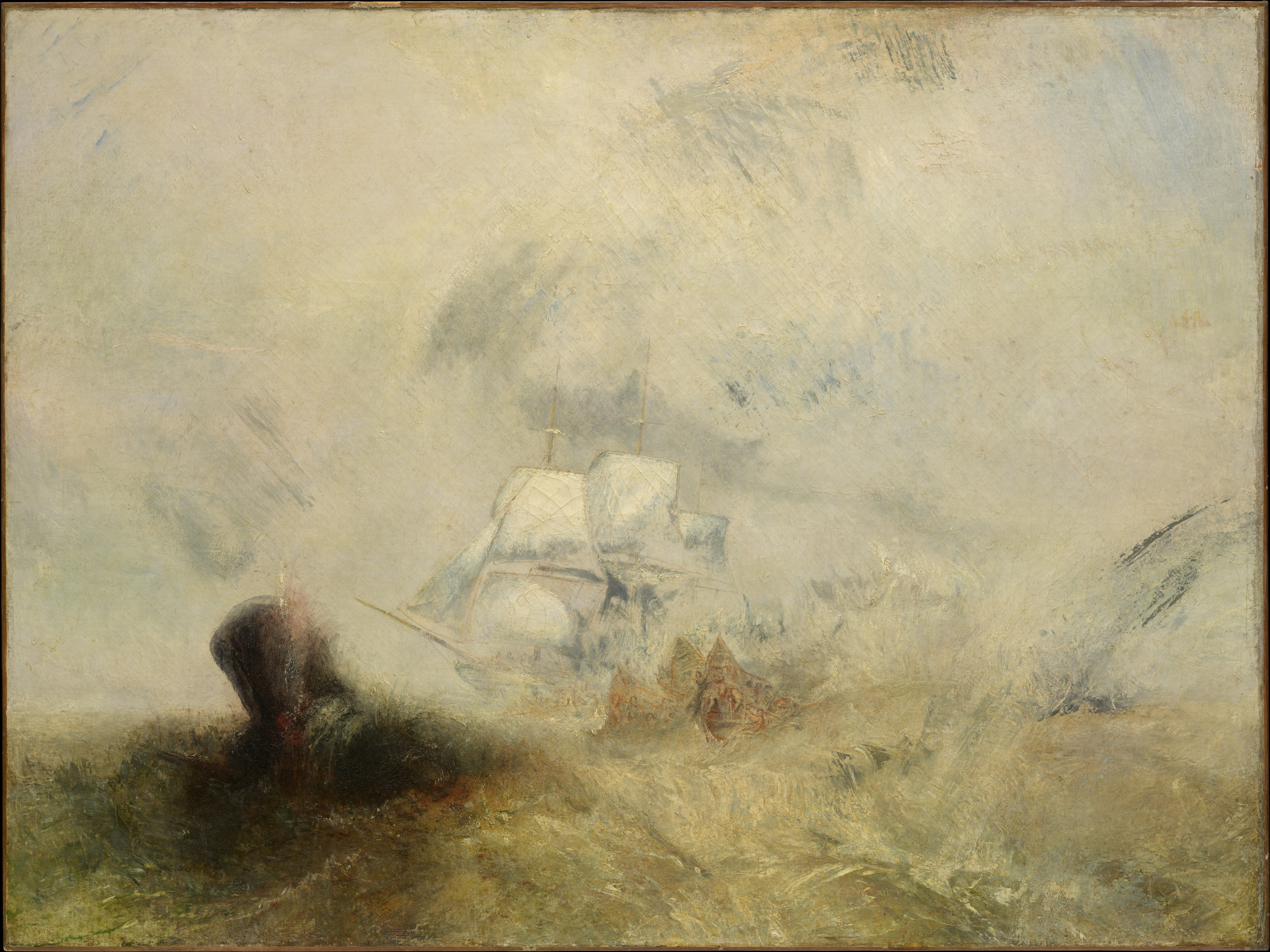
Whalers by J.M.W. Turner

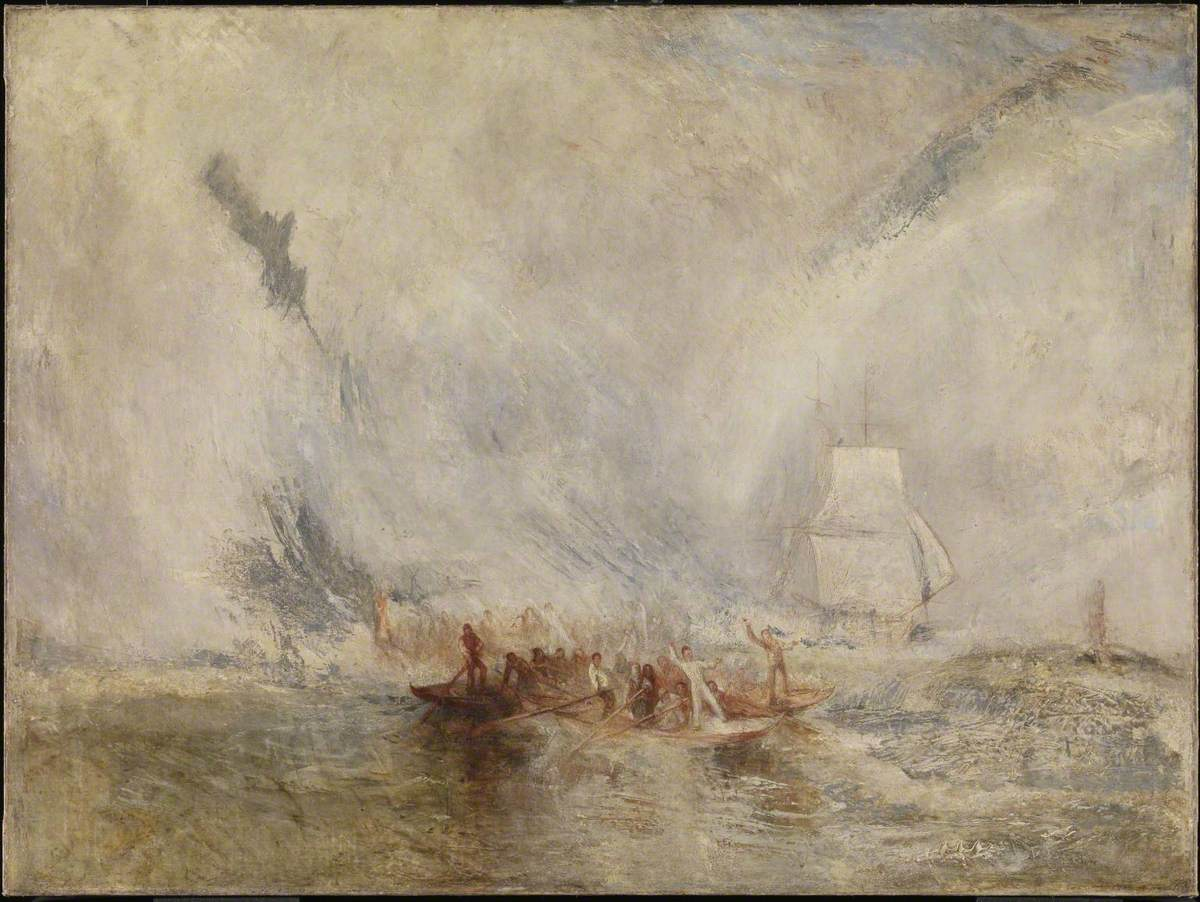
Whalers by J.M.W. Turner

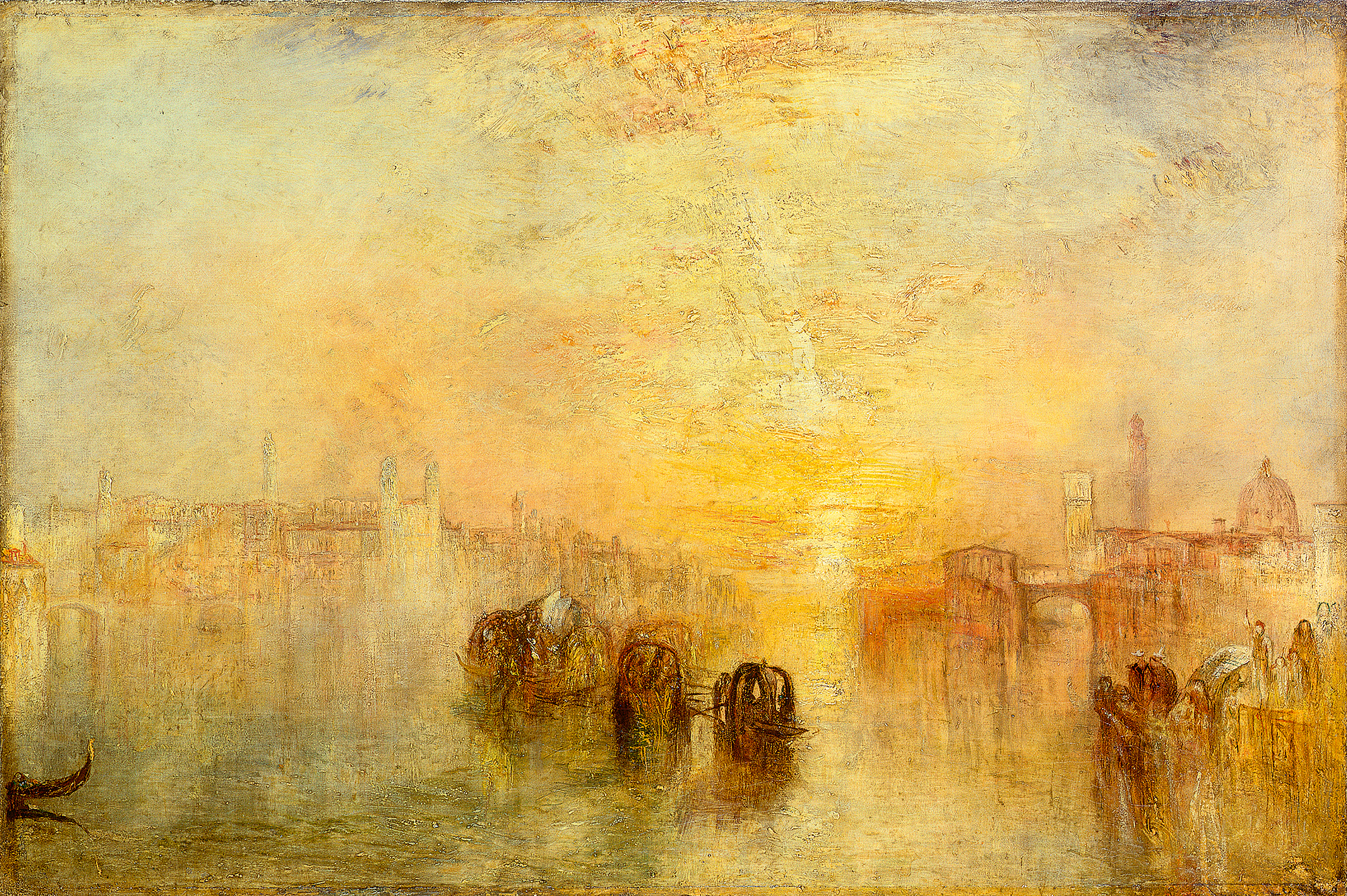
Going to the Ball by J.M.W. Turner

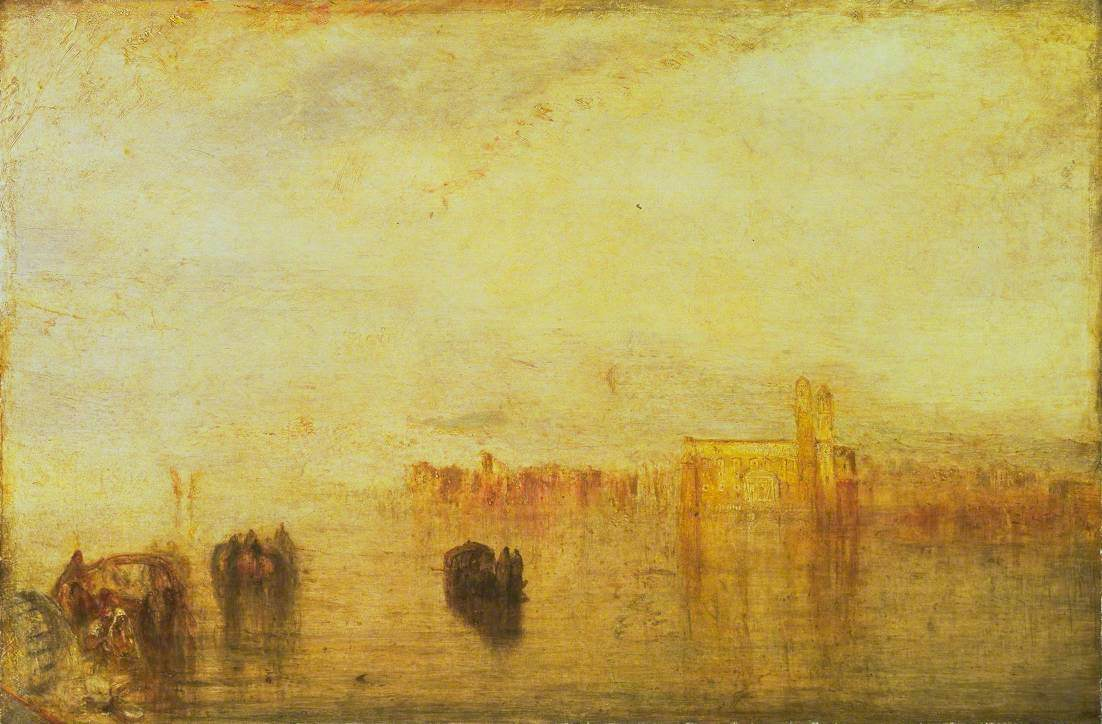
Returning from the Ball by J.M.W. Turner

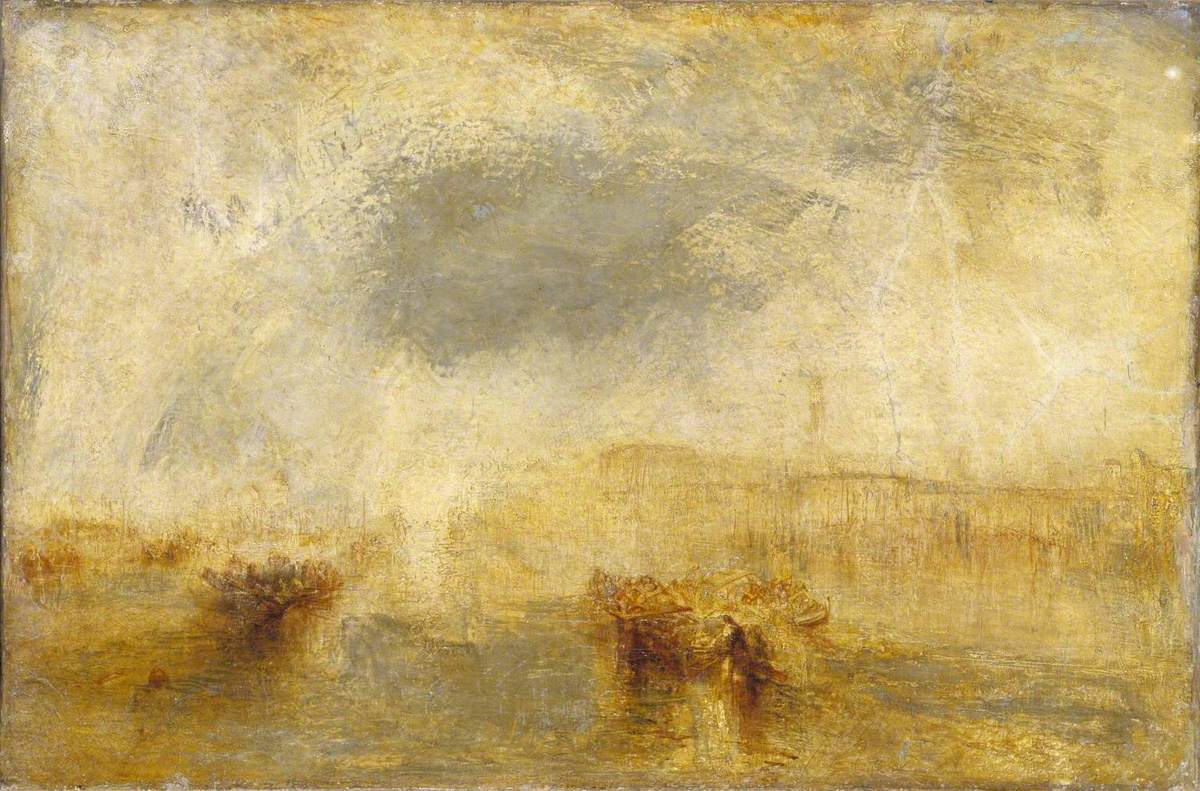
Venice, Noon by J.M.W. Turner

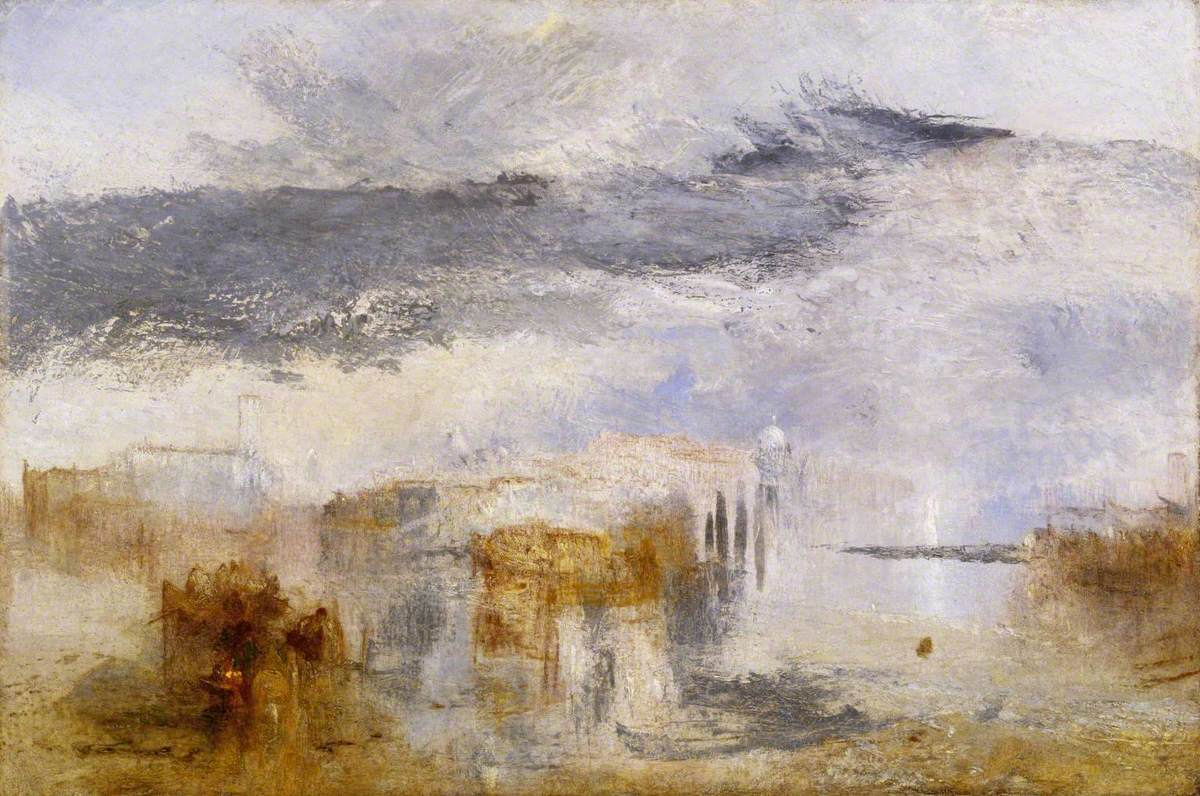
Venice, Sunset, a Fisher by J.M.W. Turner

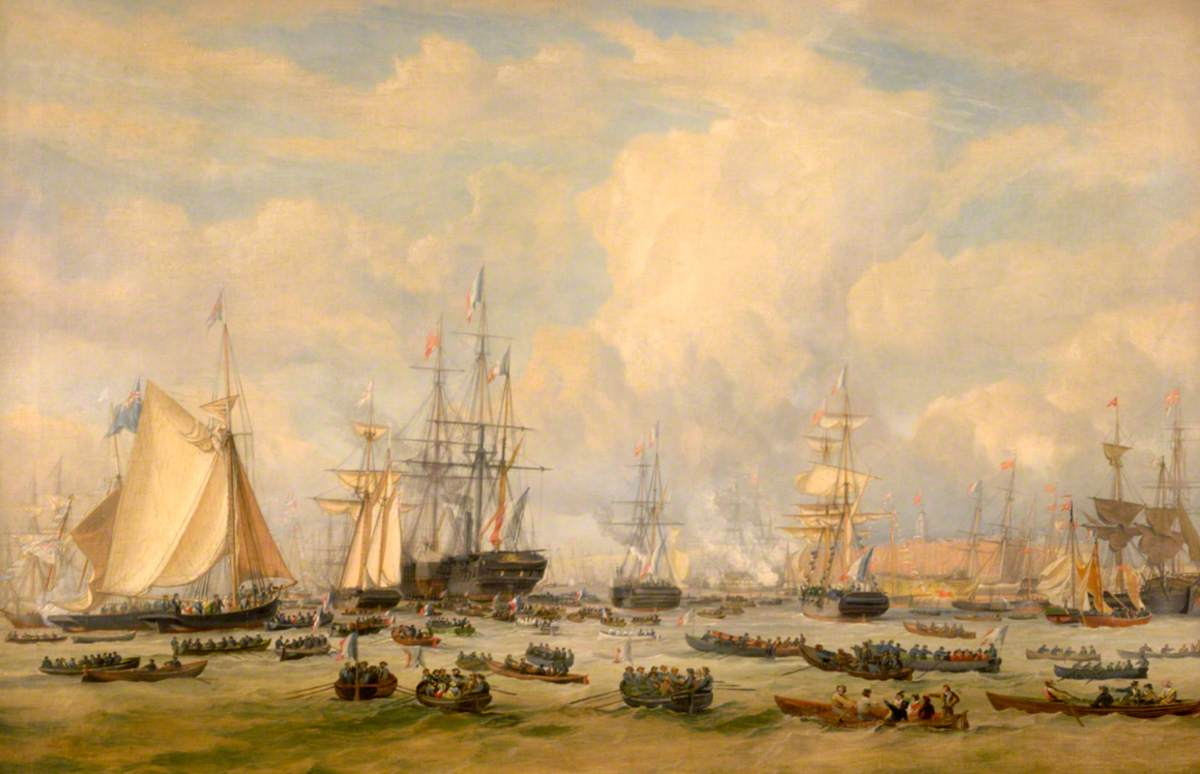
The Arrival of the King of France in Portsmouth by John Christian Schetky

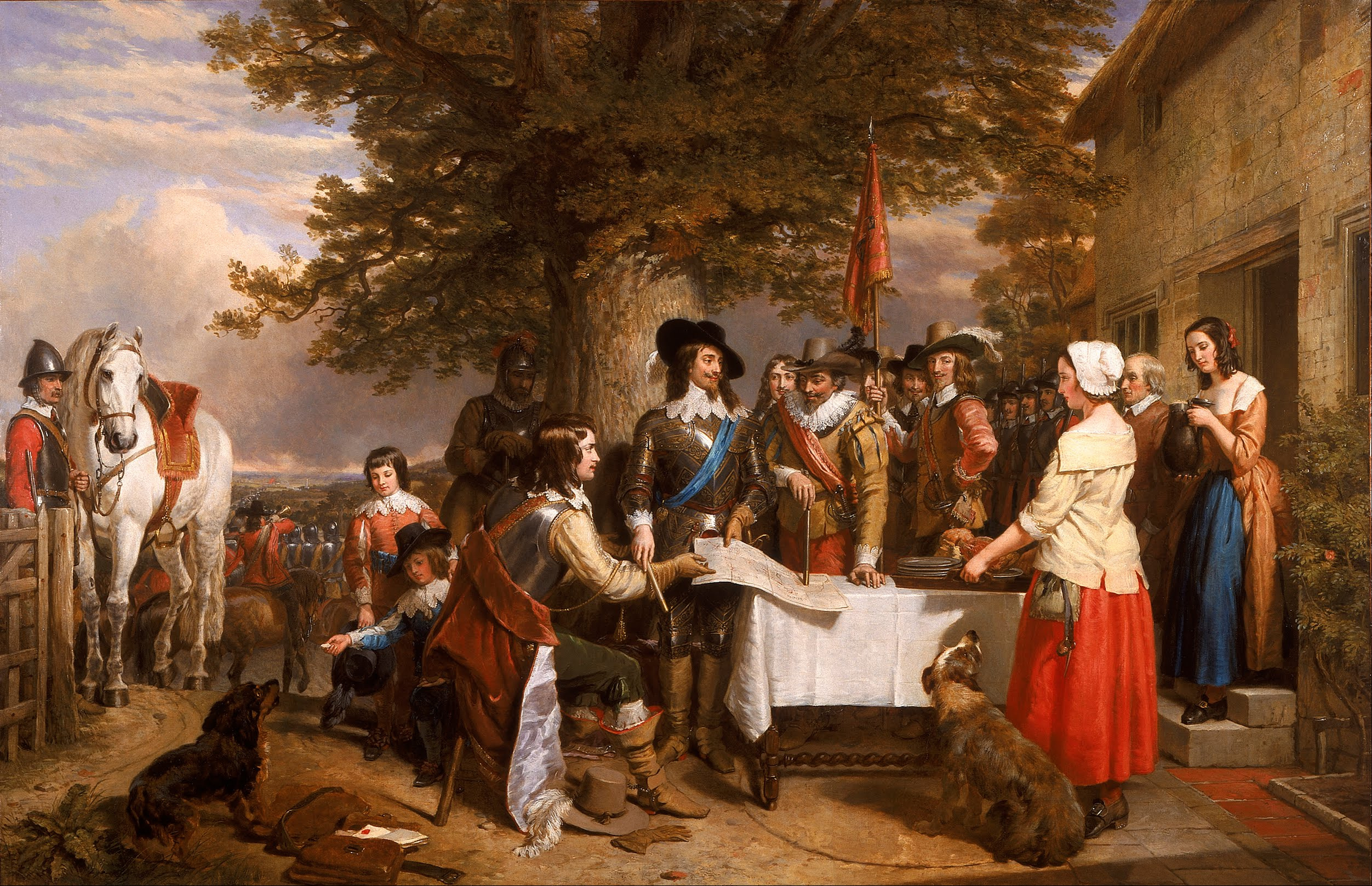
The Eve of the Battle of Edgehill by Charles Landseer

Ruins of the Great Temple at Karnak by David Roberts

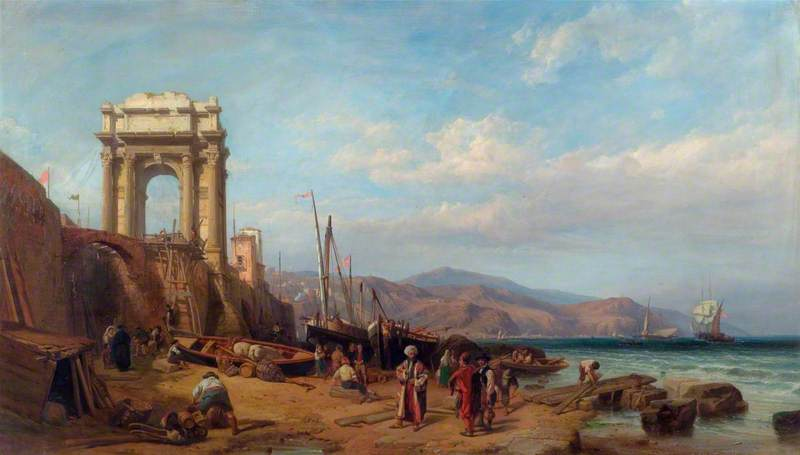
Trajan's Arch, Ancona by Clarkson Stanfield

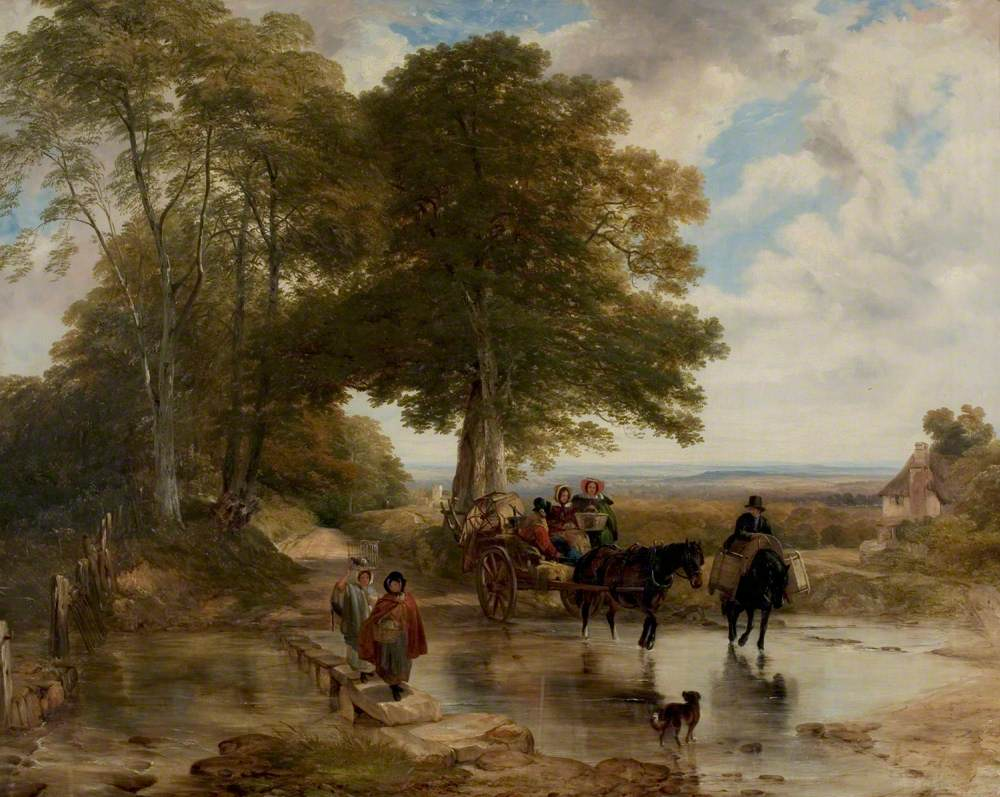
The Market Cart at a Brook by Frederick Richard Lee

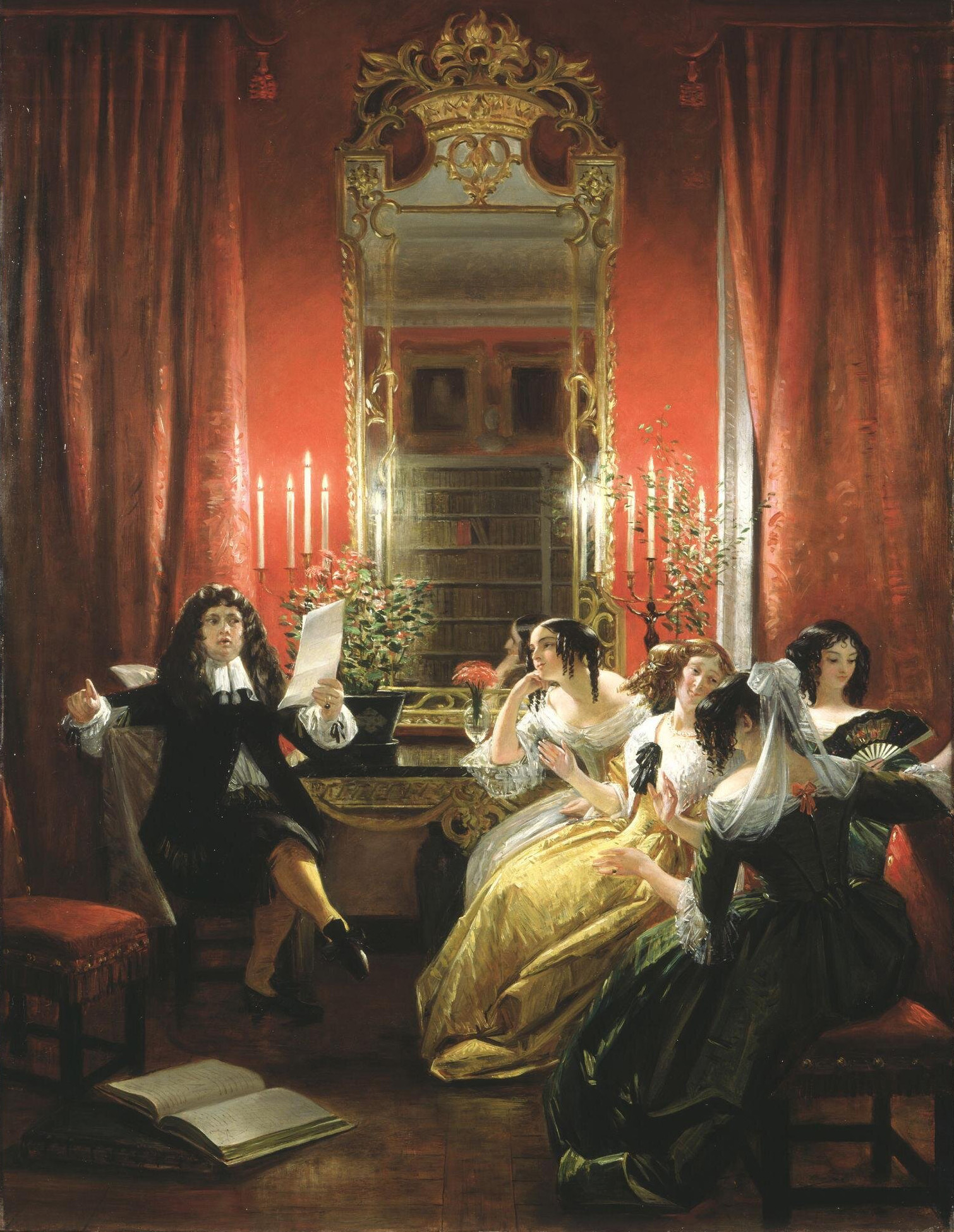
Les Femmes Savantes by Charles Robert Leslie

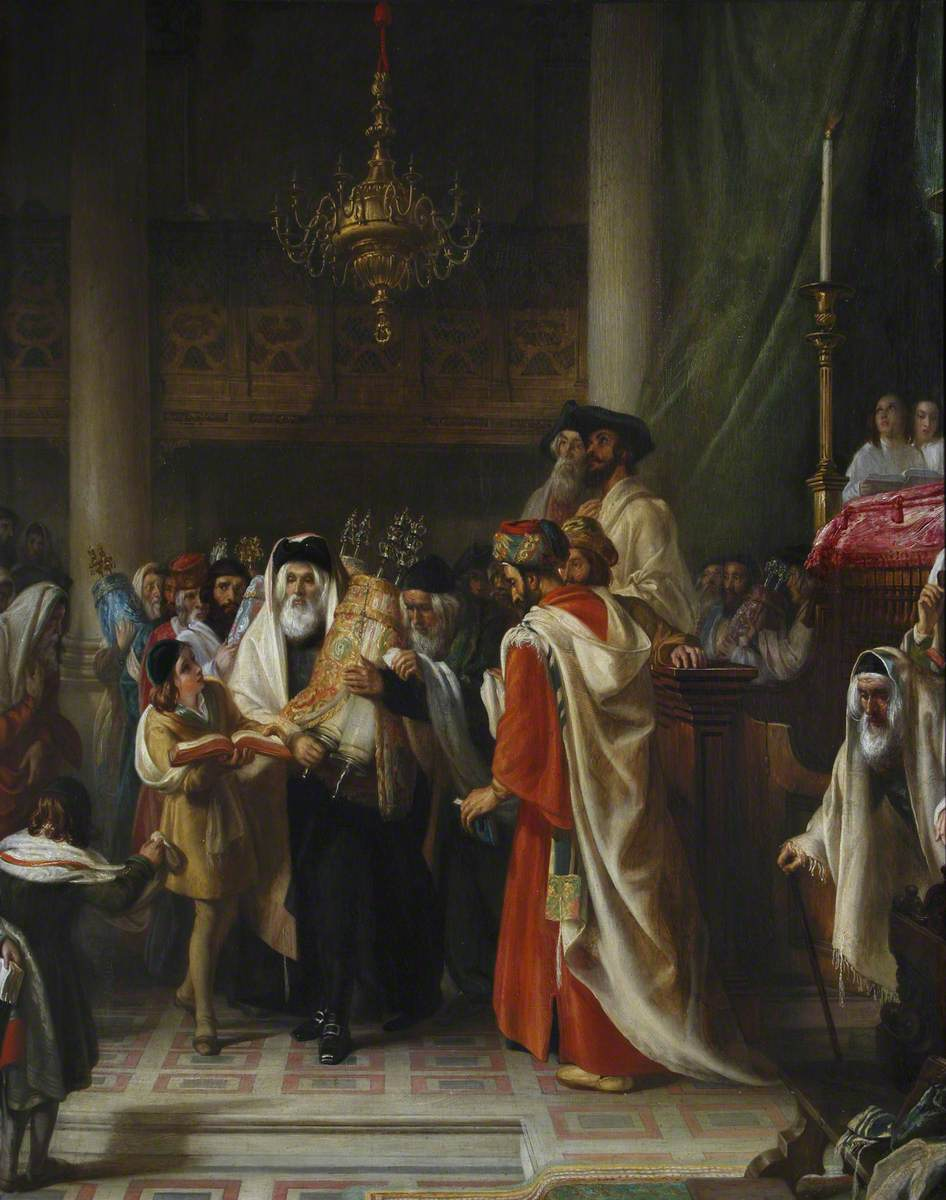
Procession of the Law by Solomon Hart

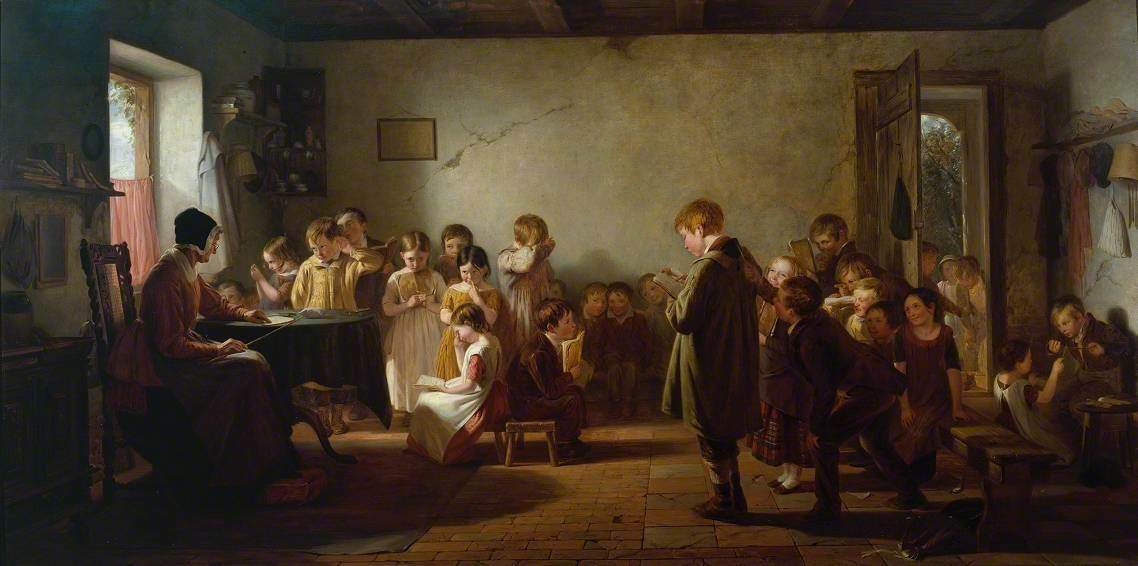
A Dame's School by Thomas Webster

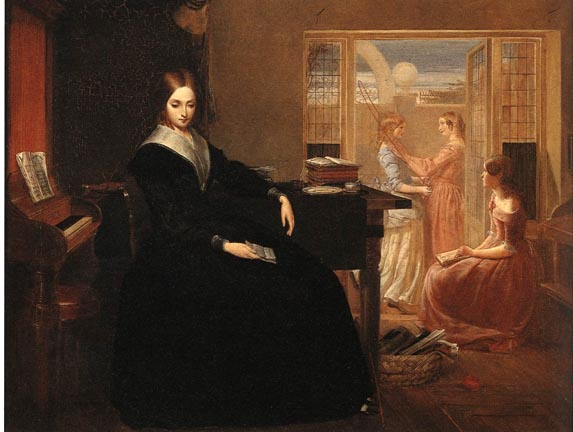
The Governess by Richard Redgrave

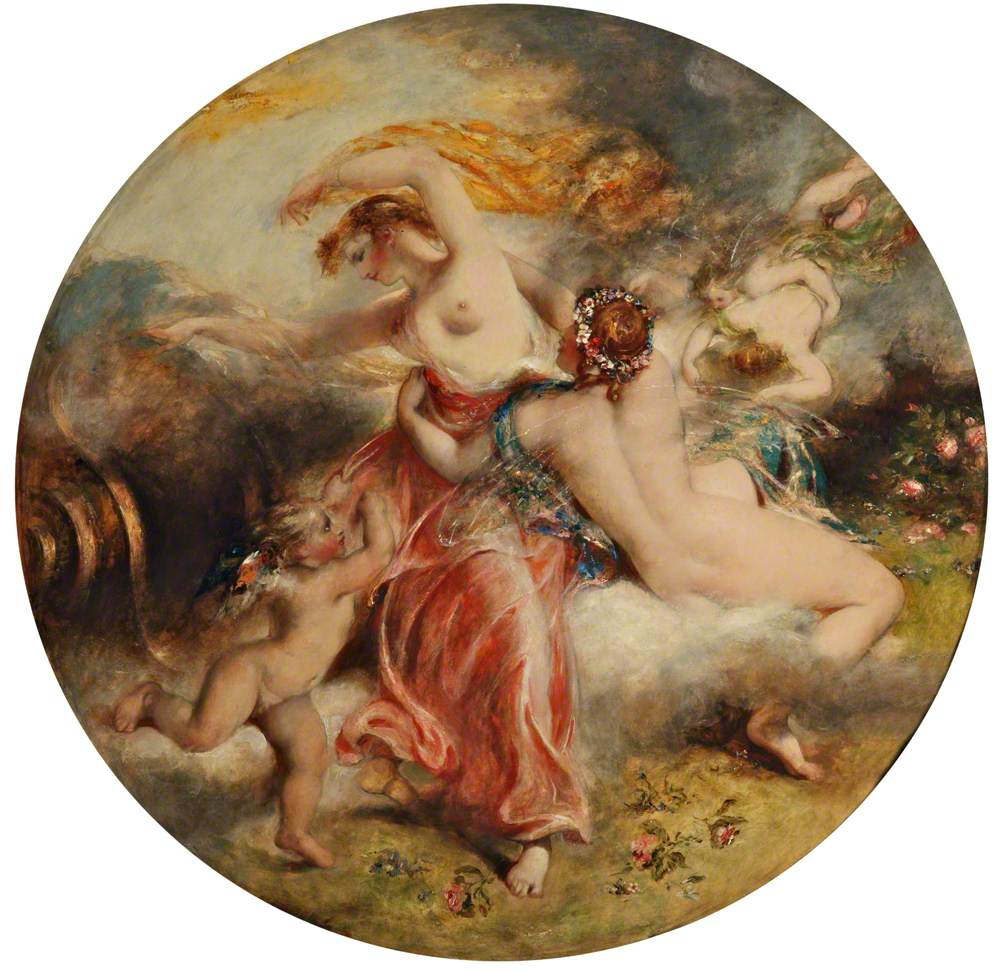
Aurora and Zephyr by William Etty

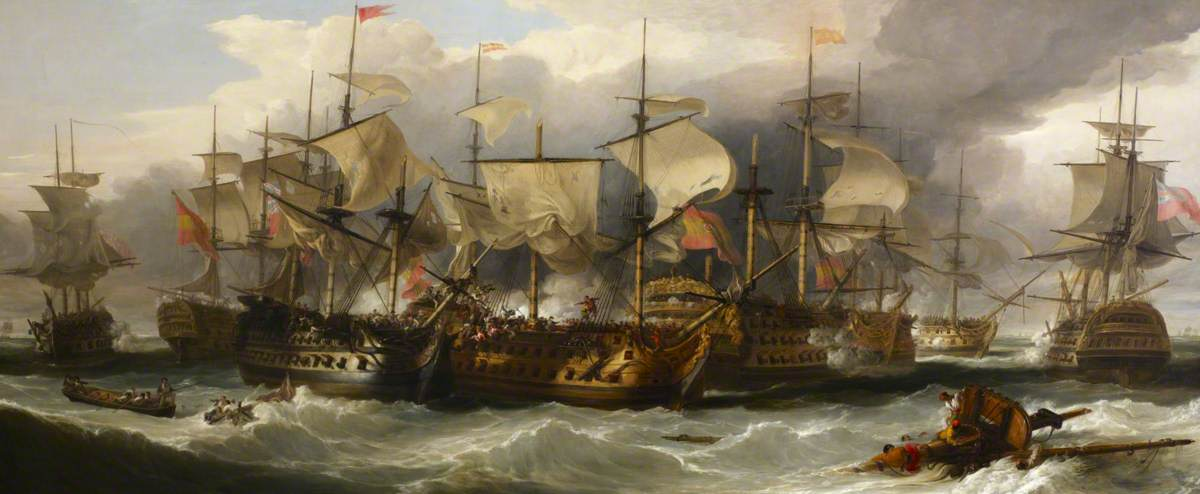
The Battle of Cape St Vincent by William Allan

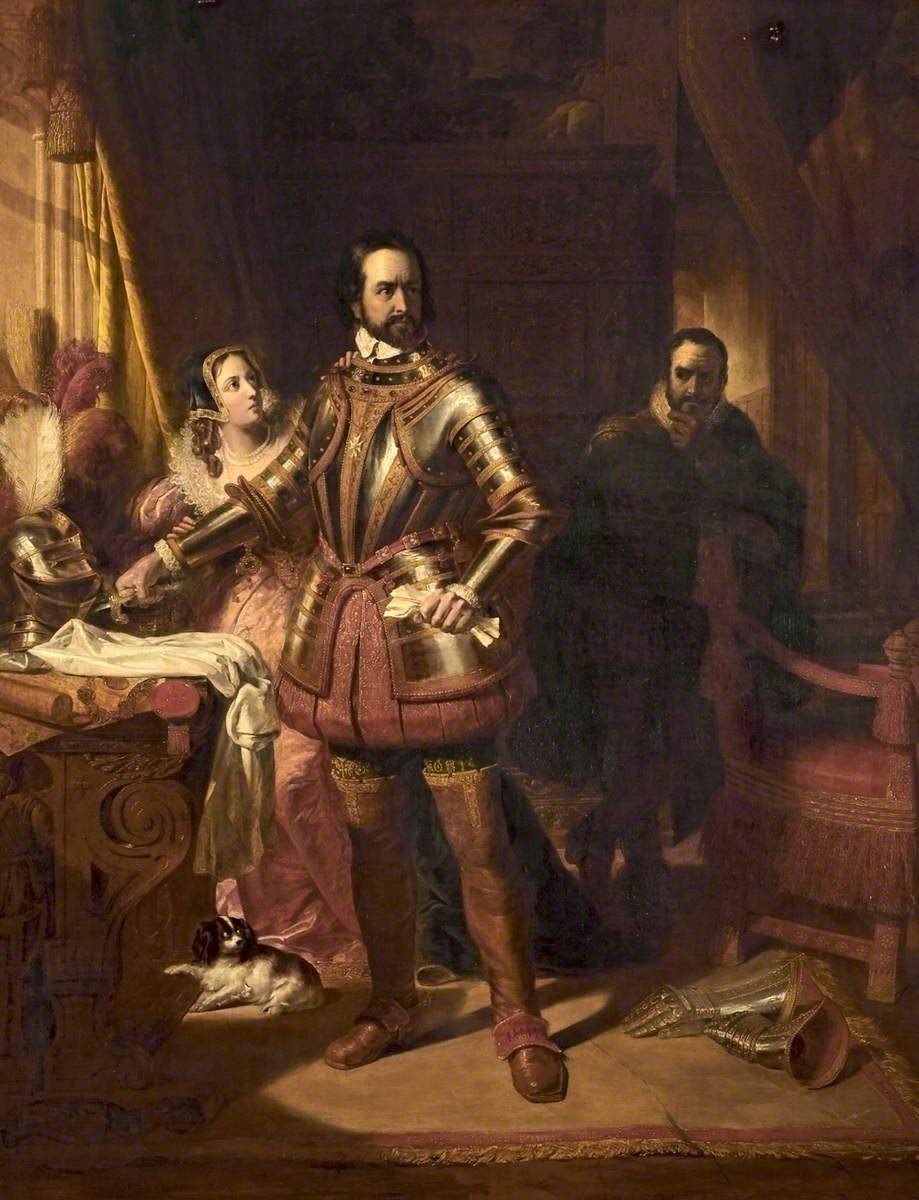
The Maréchal Biron Conspiracy by George Lance

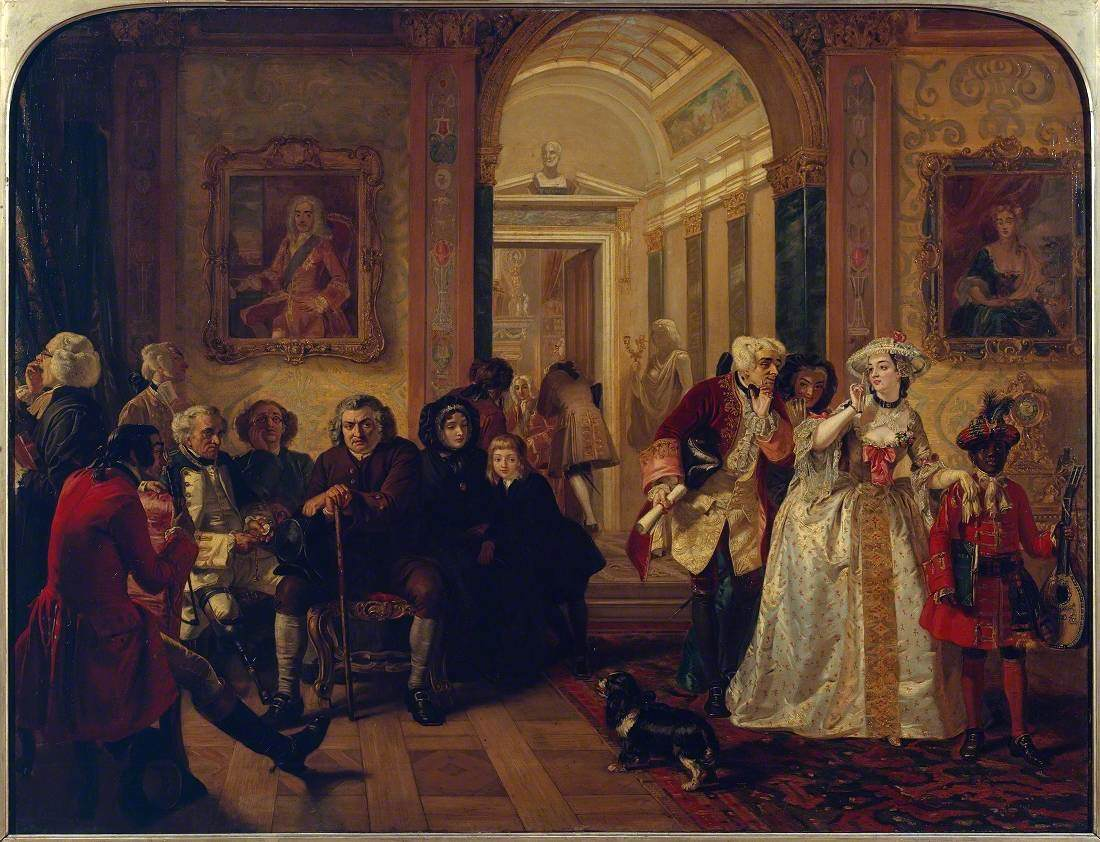
Doctor Johnson Waiting for an Audience by Edward Matthew Ward

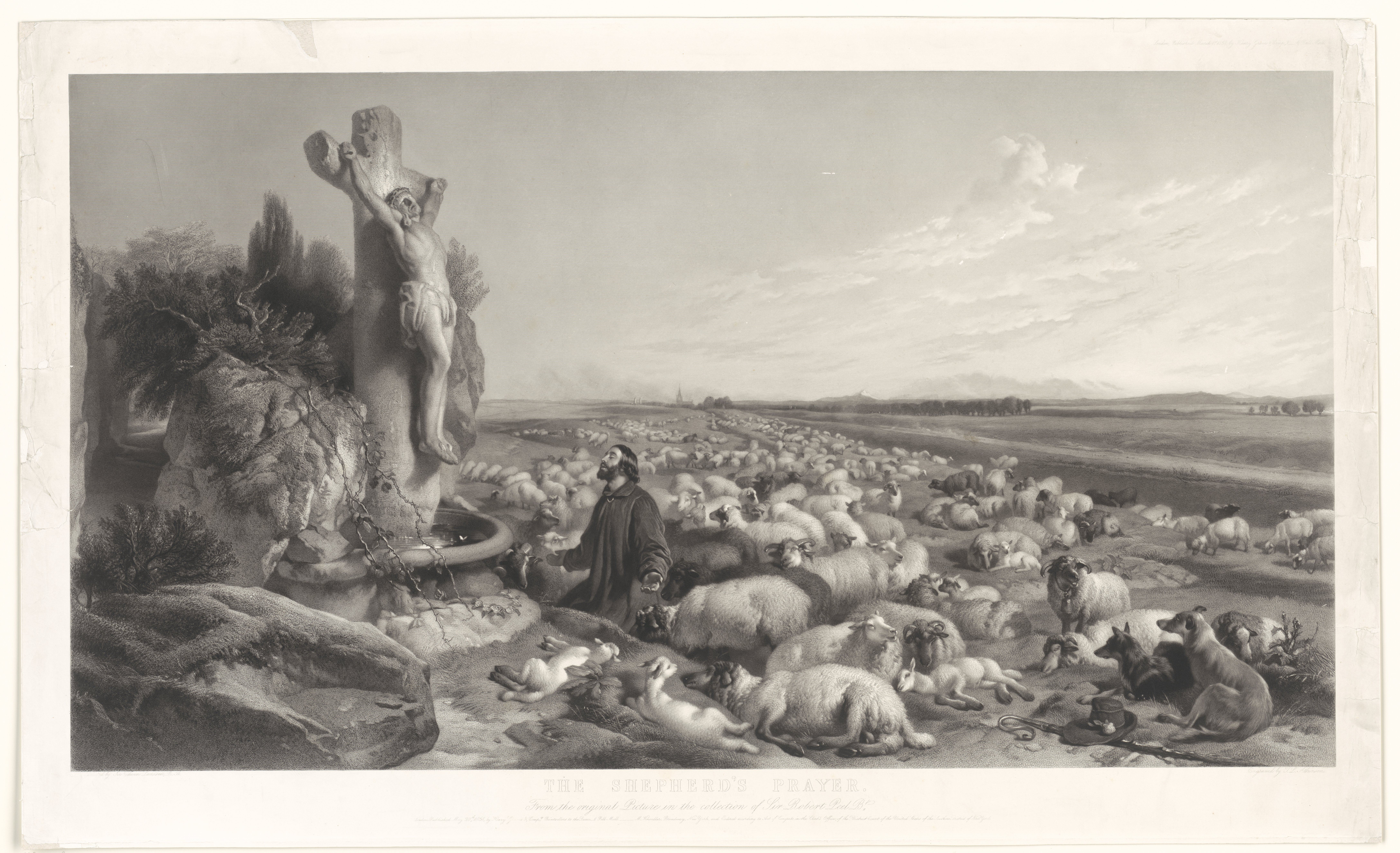
The Shepherd's Prayer by Edwin Landseer

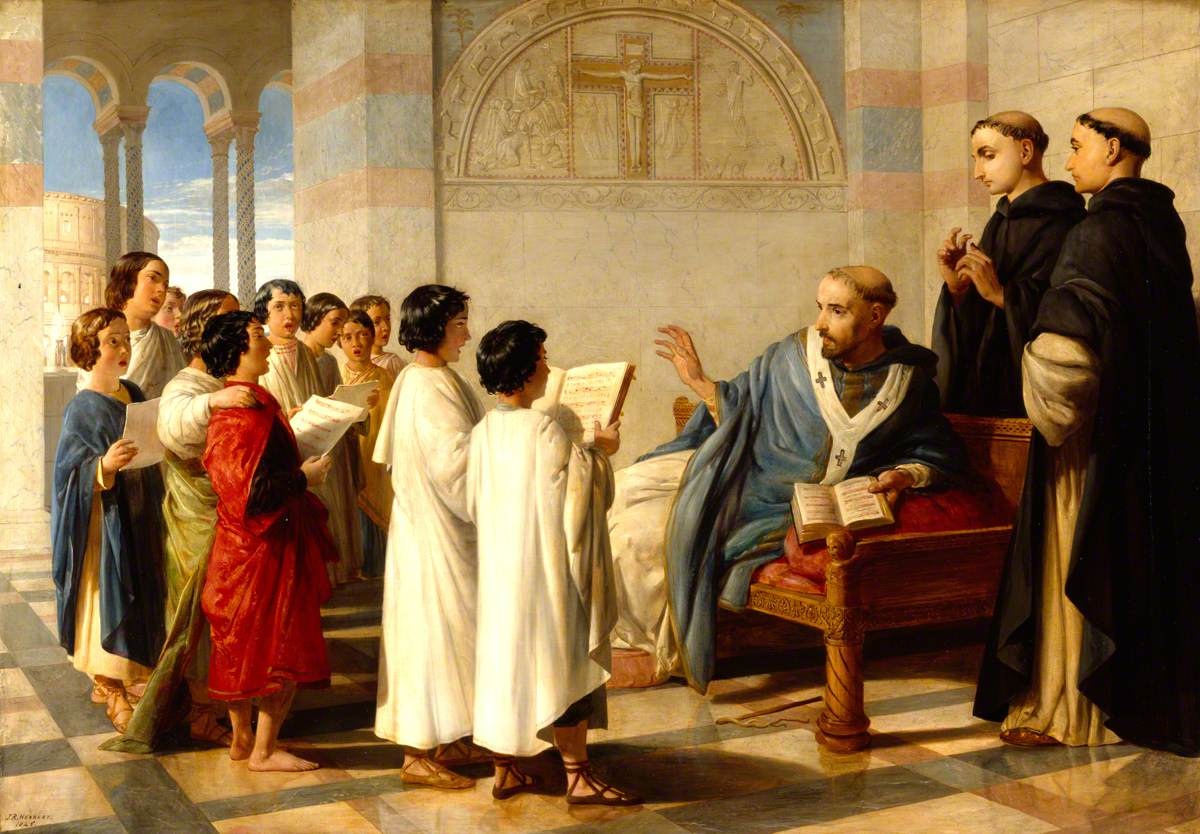
Saint Gregory Teaching His Chant by John Rogers Herbert

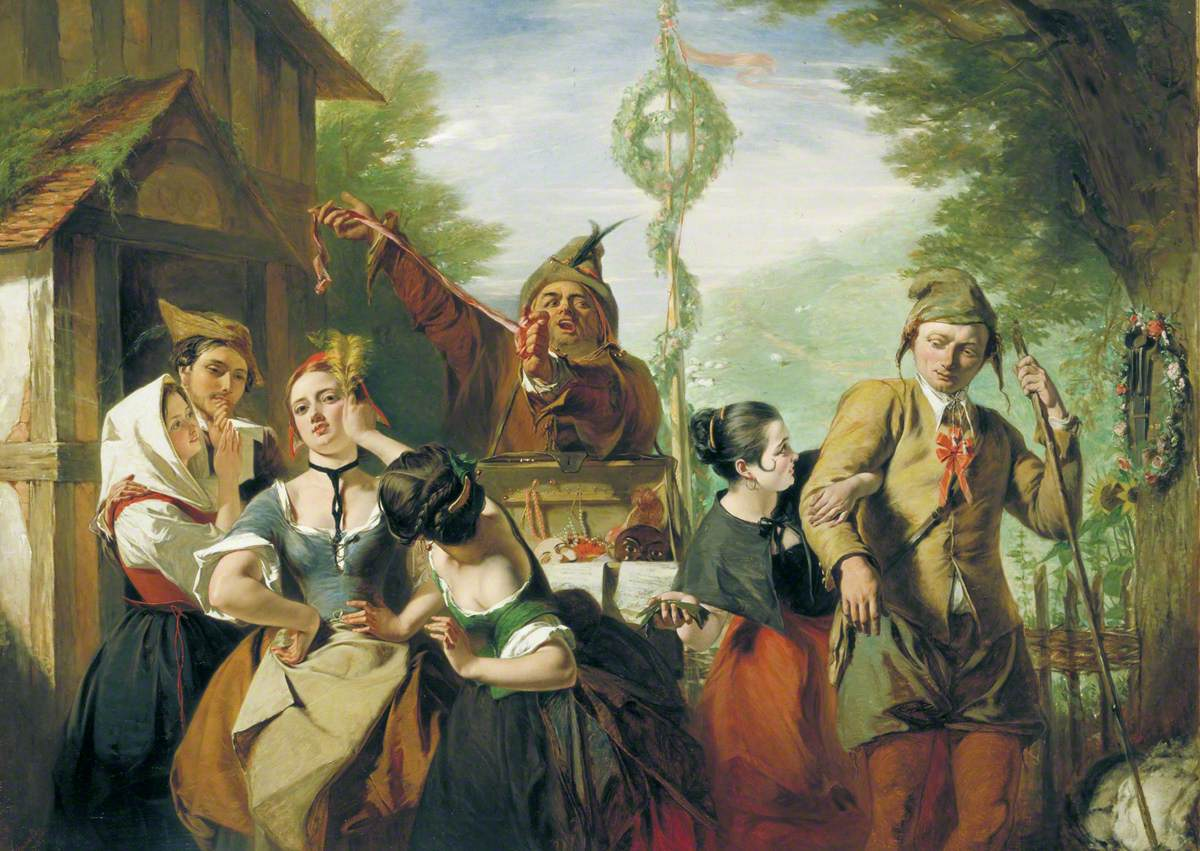
The Winter's Tale by Augustus Leopold Egg

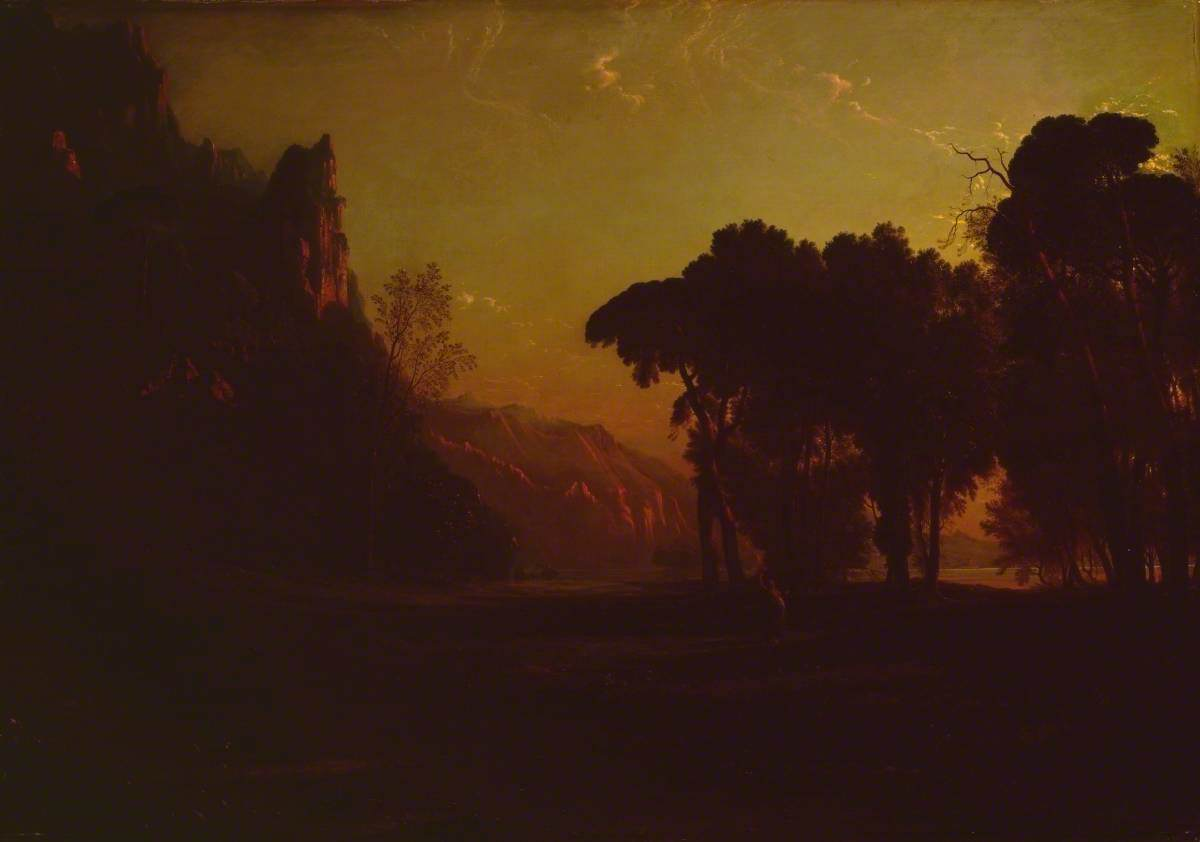
The Wood Nymph's Hymn to the Rising Sun by Francis Danby

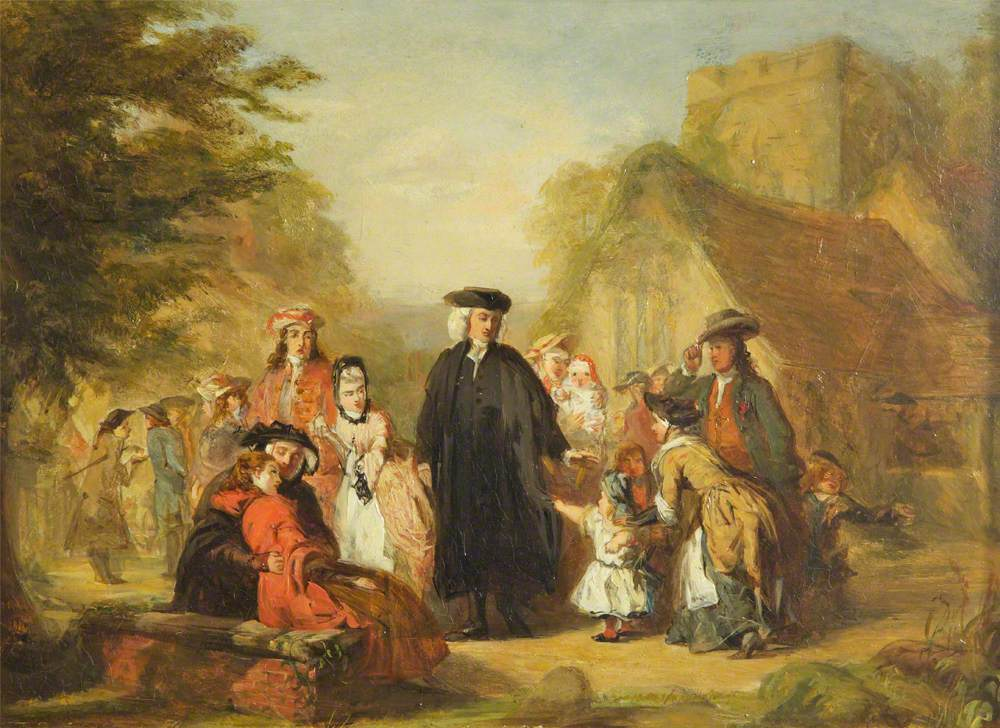
The Village Pastor by William Powell Frith

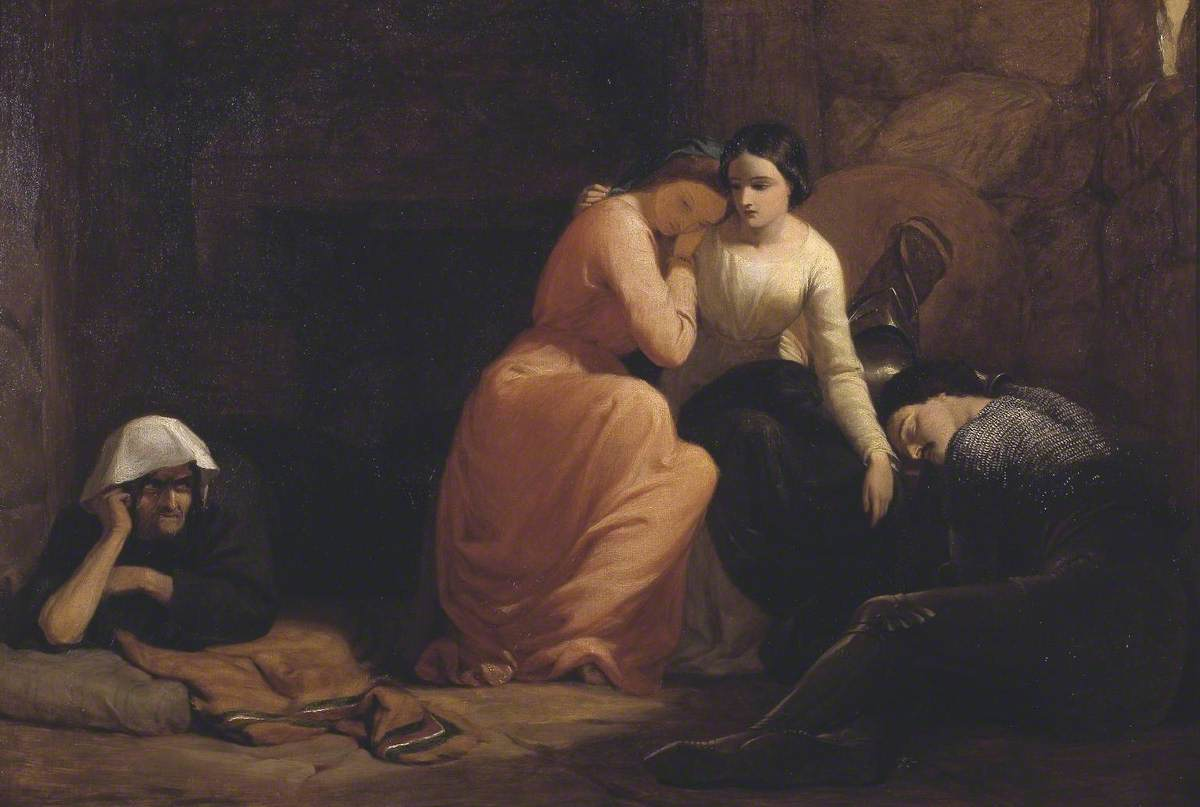
Amoret, Aemylia and Prince Arthur, in the Cottage of Sclaunder by Frederick Richard Pickersgill

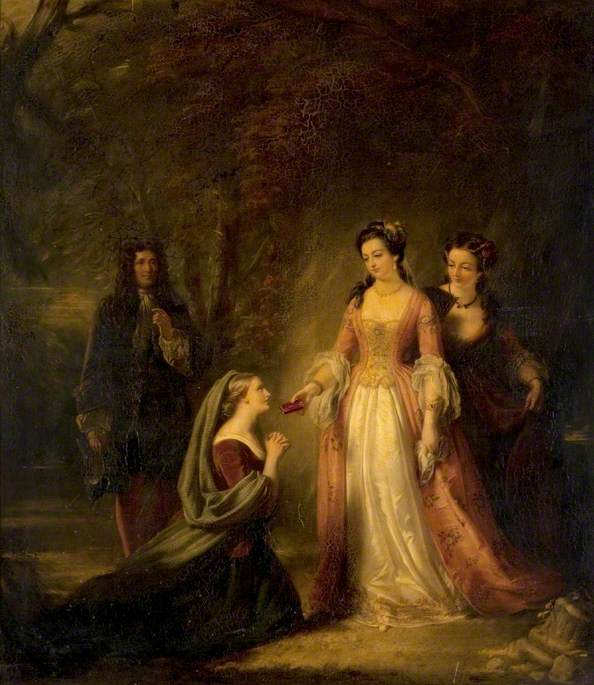
Jeanie Deans and the Queen by James Godsell Middleton

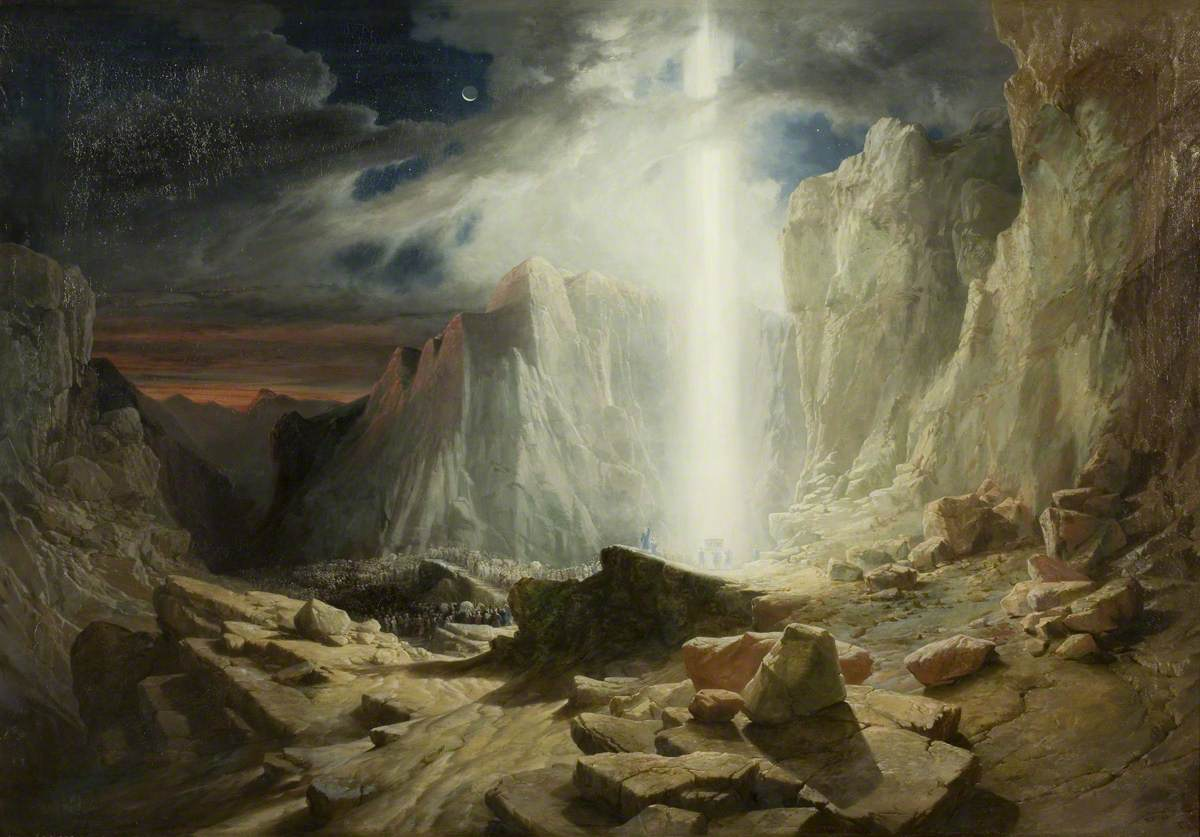
The Israelites Passing through the Wilderness, Preceded by the Pillar of Light by William West

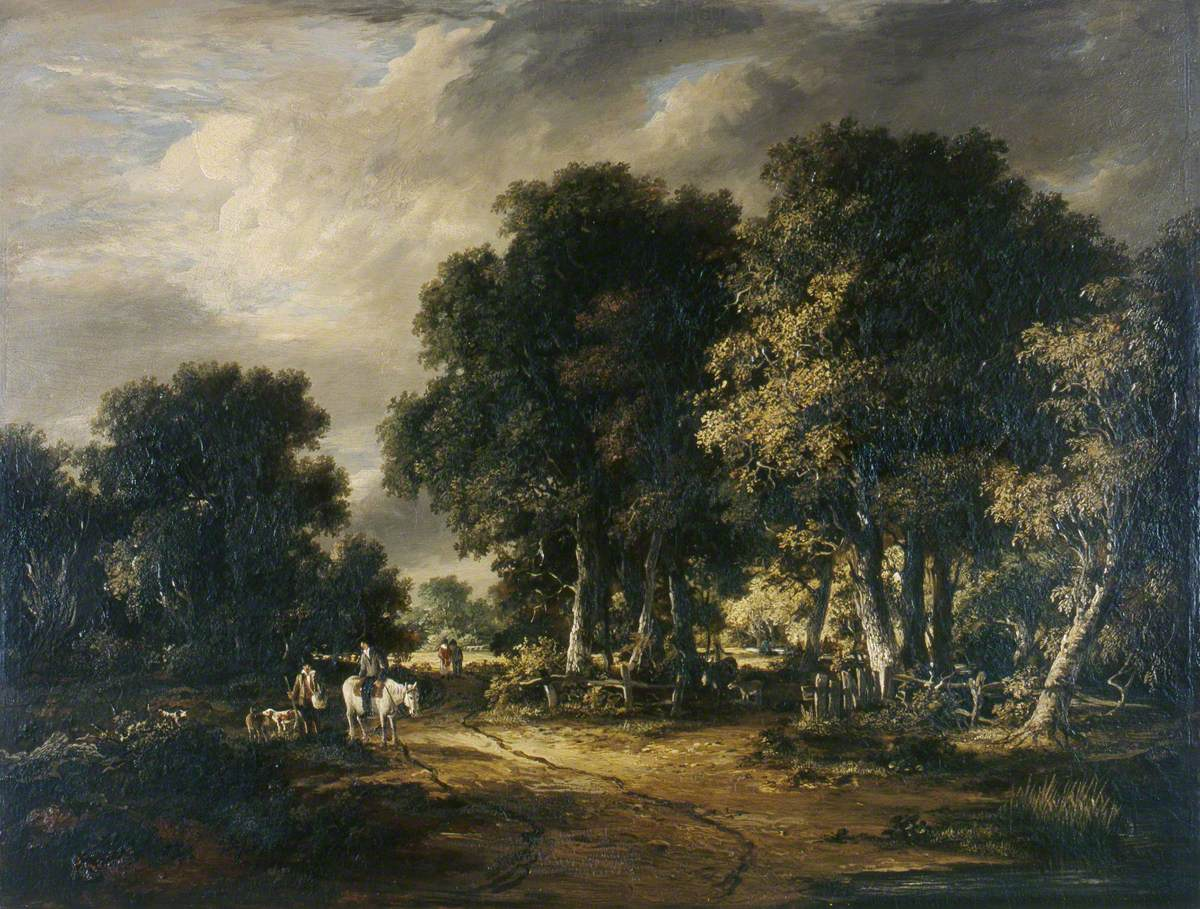
Road Through a Forest by James Stark

Sabrina and the Nymphs by William Edward Frost

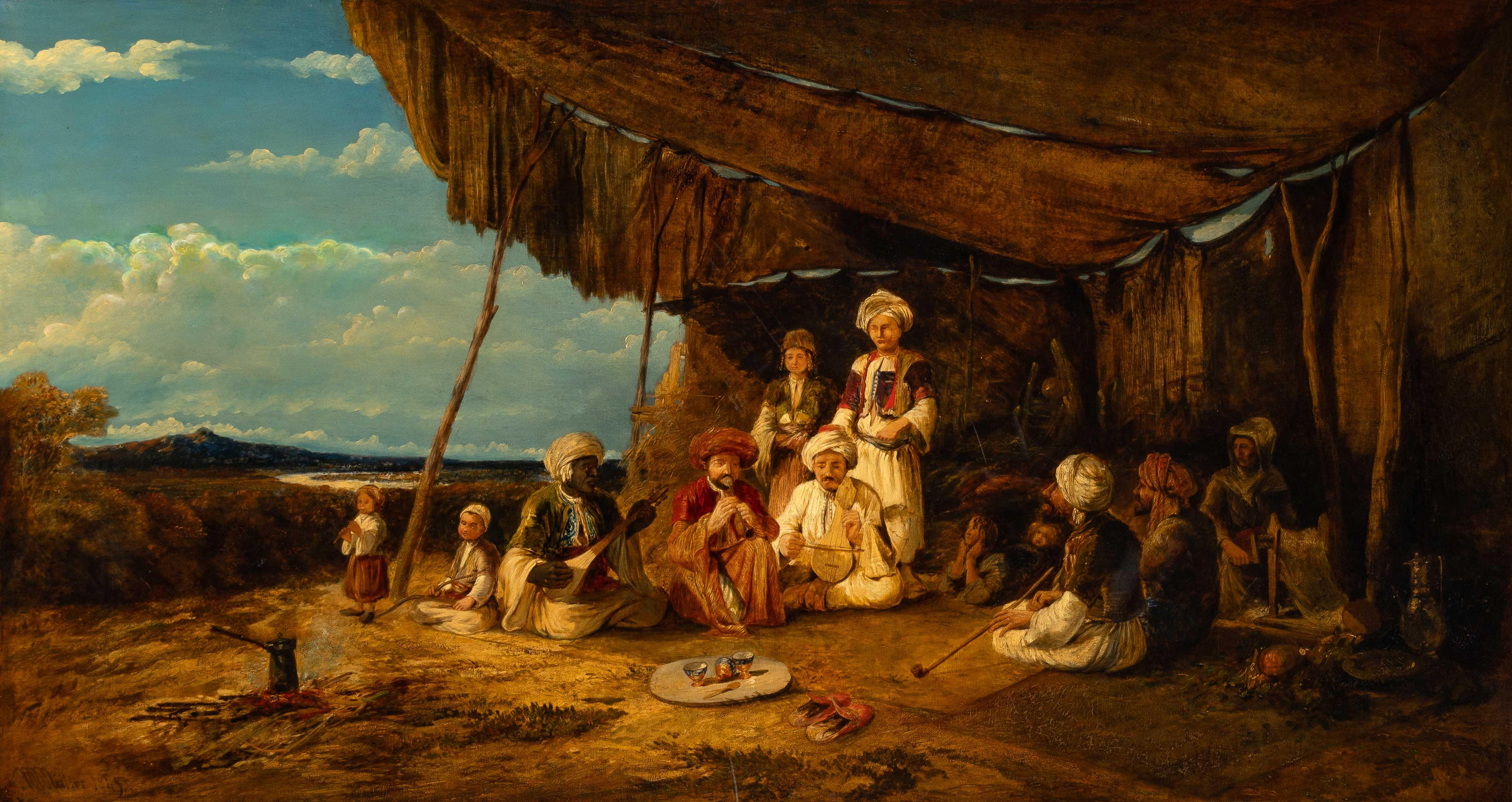
Scene in a Tent at Xanthus by William James Müller

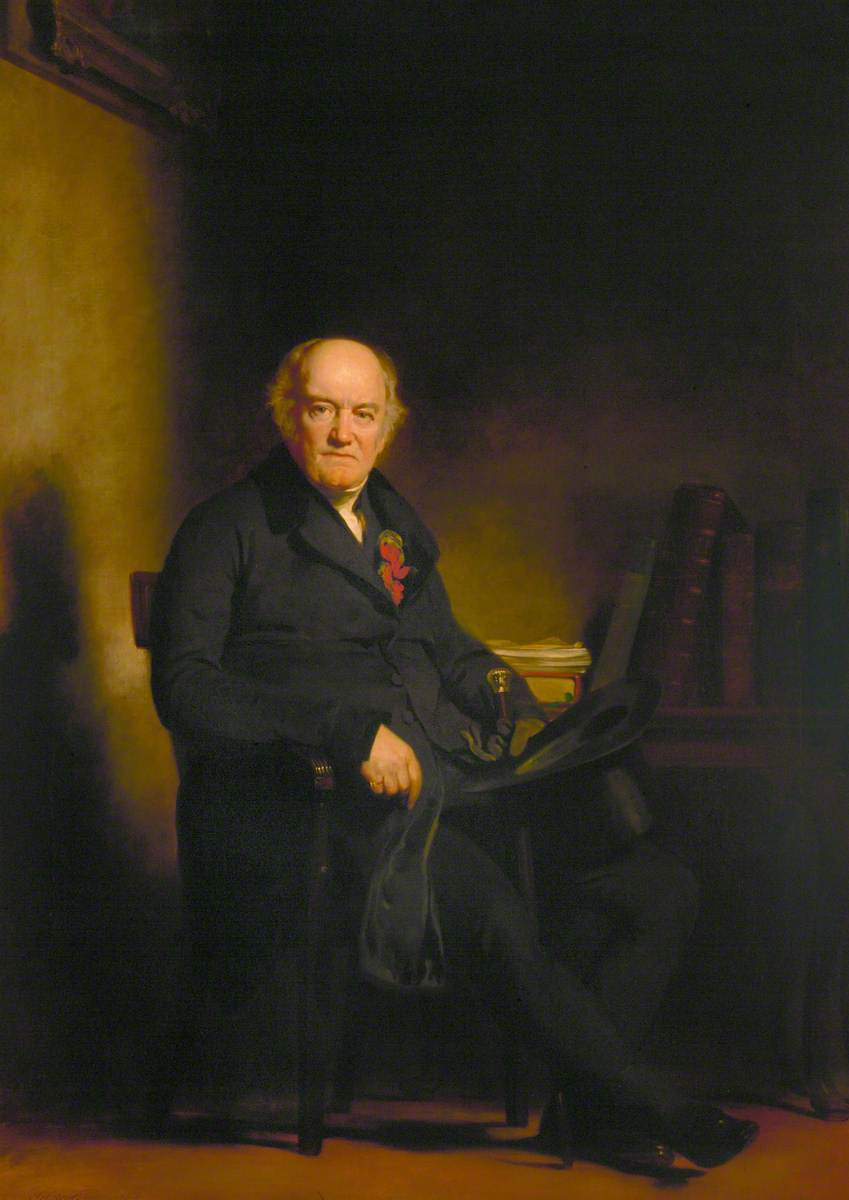
Alexander Brunton by John Watson Gordon

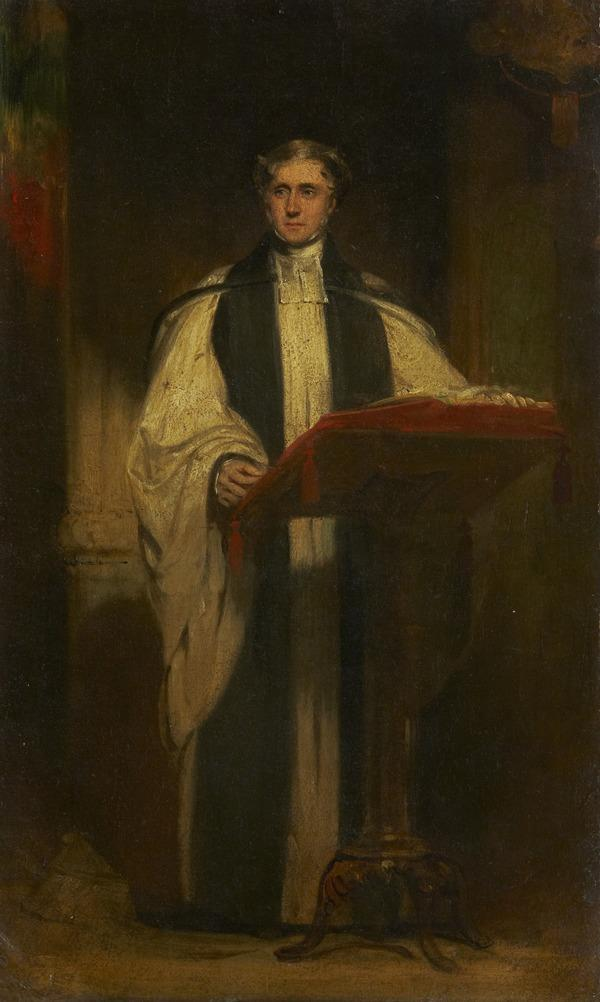
Edward Ramsay by John Watson Gordon

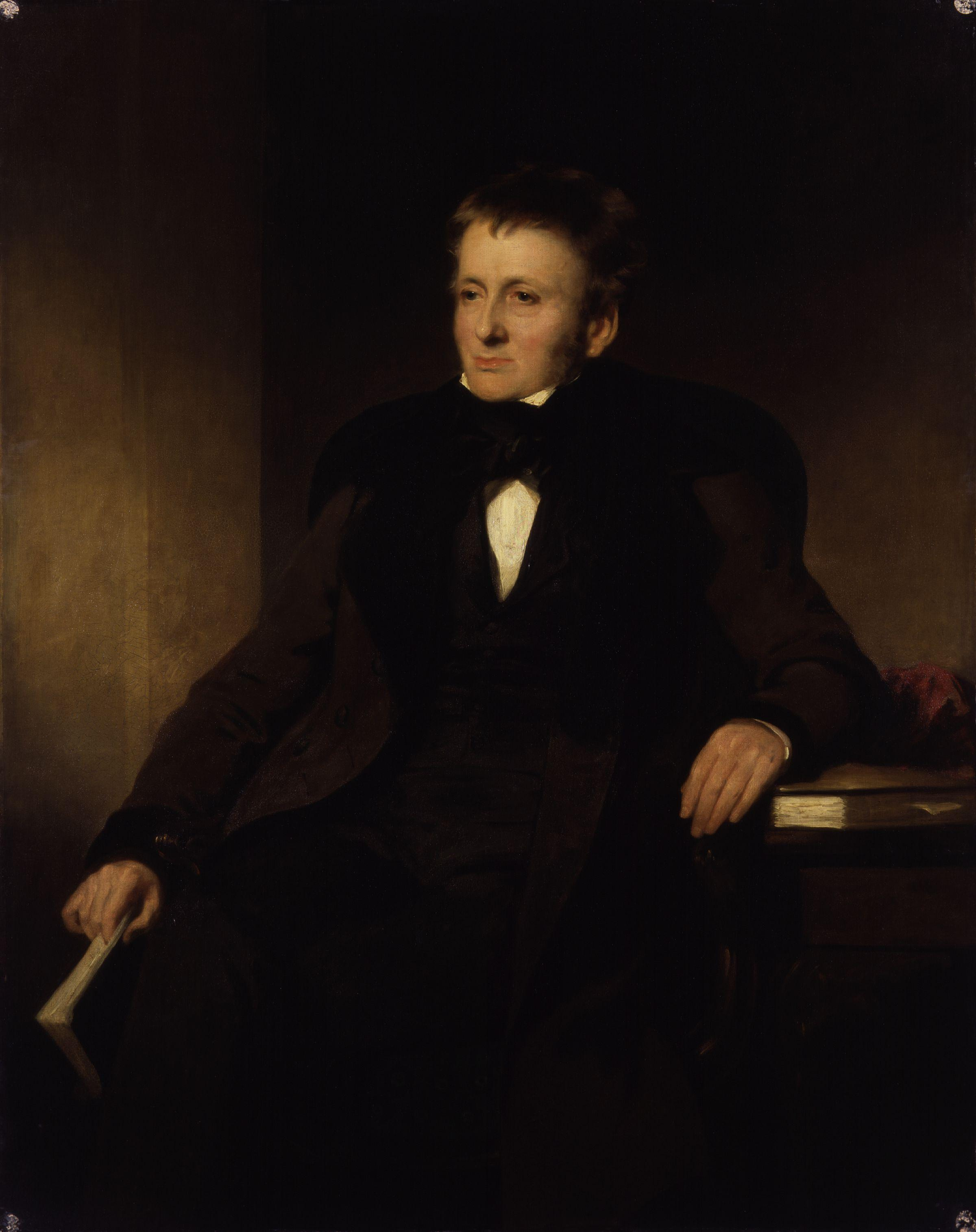
Thomas De Quincey by John Watson Gordon

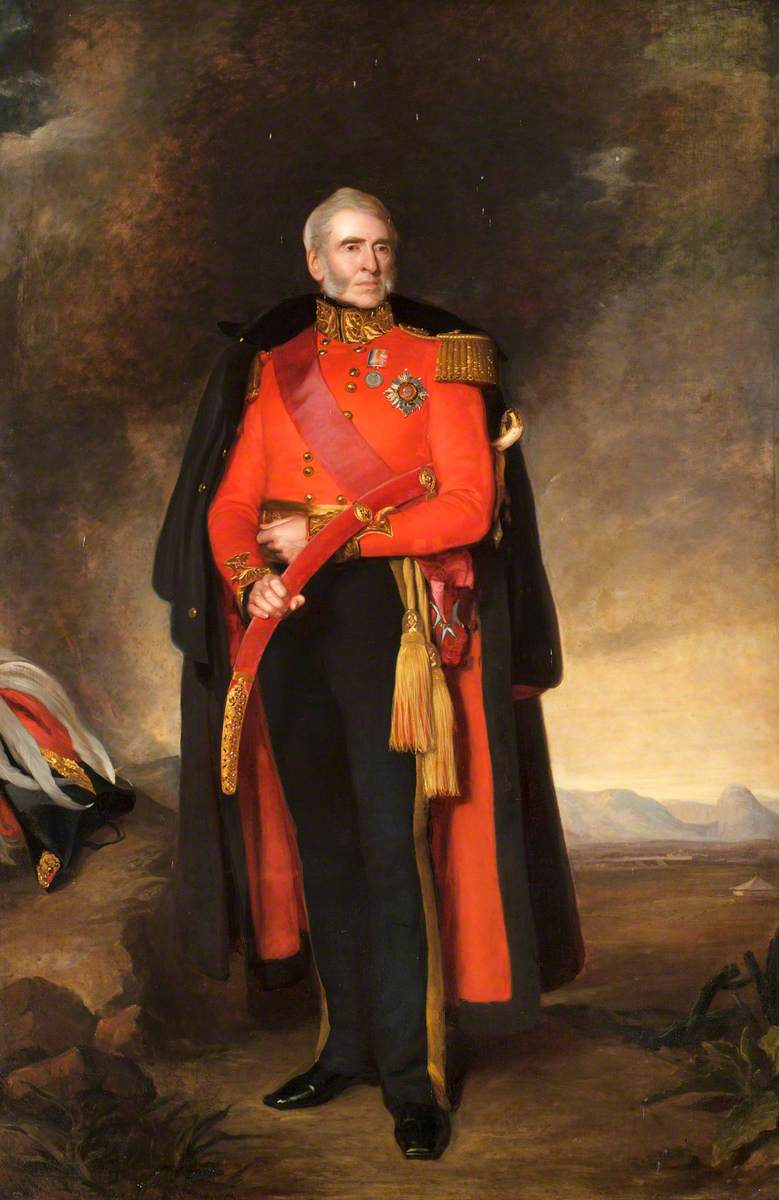
William Nott by Thomas Brigstocke

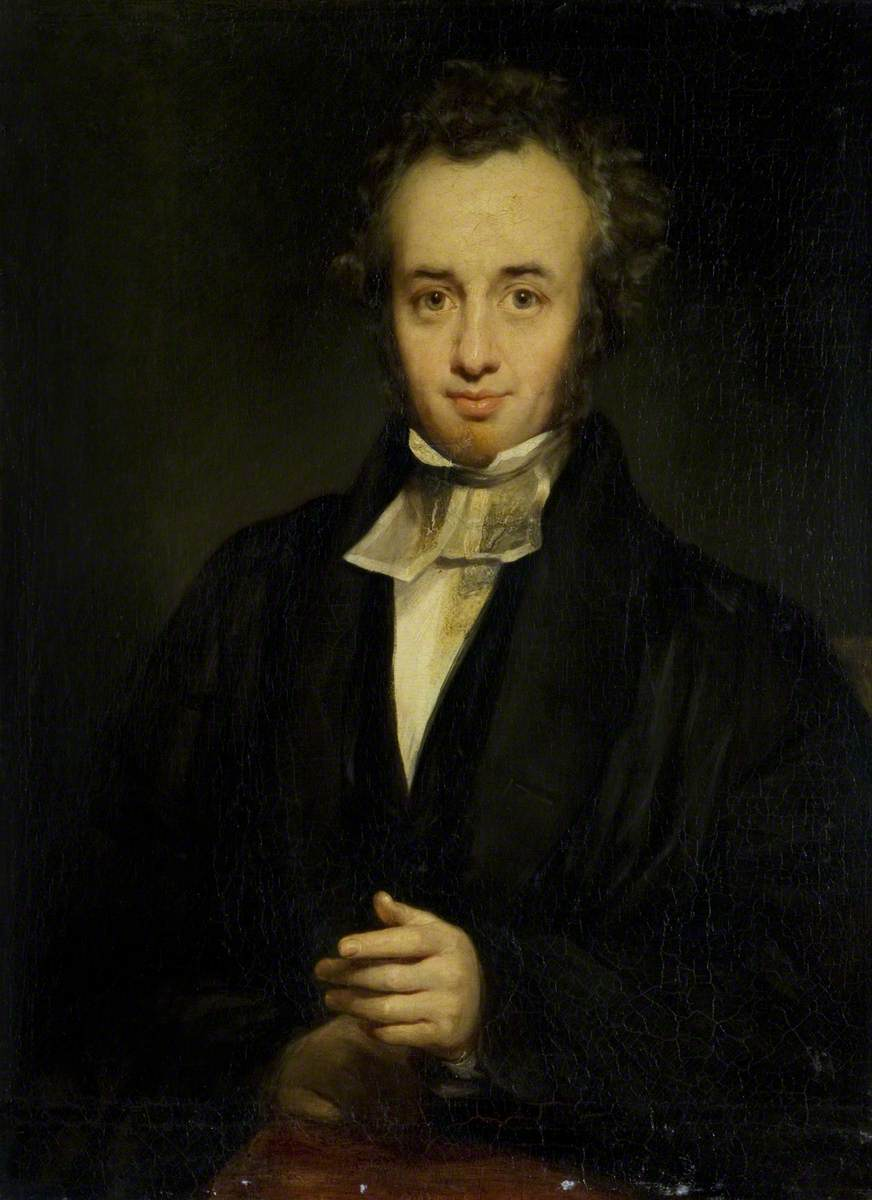
John Scott Porter by Richard Rothwell

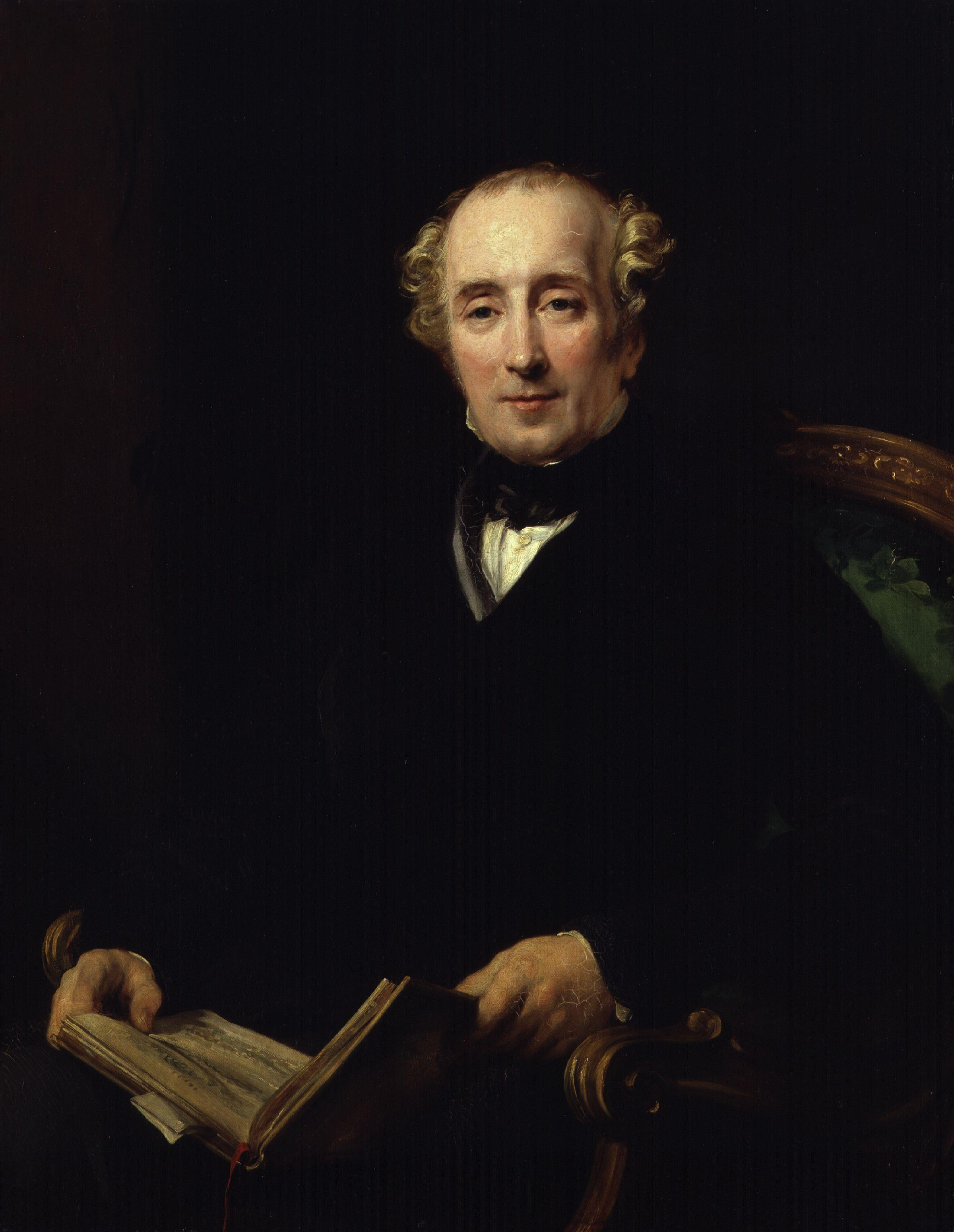
Patrick Fraser Tytler by Margaret Sarah Carpenter

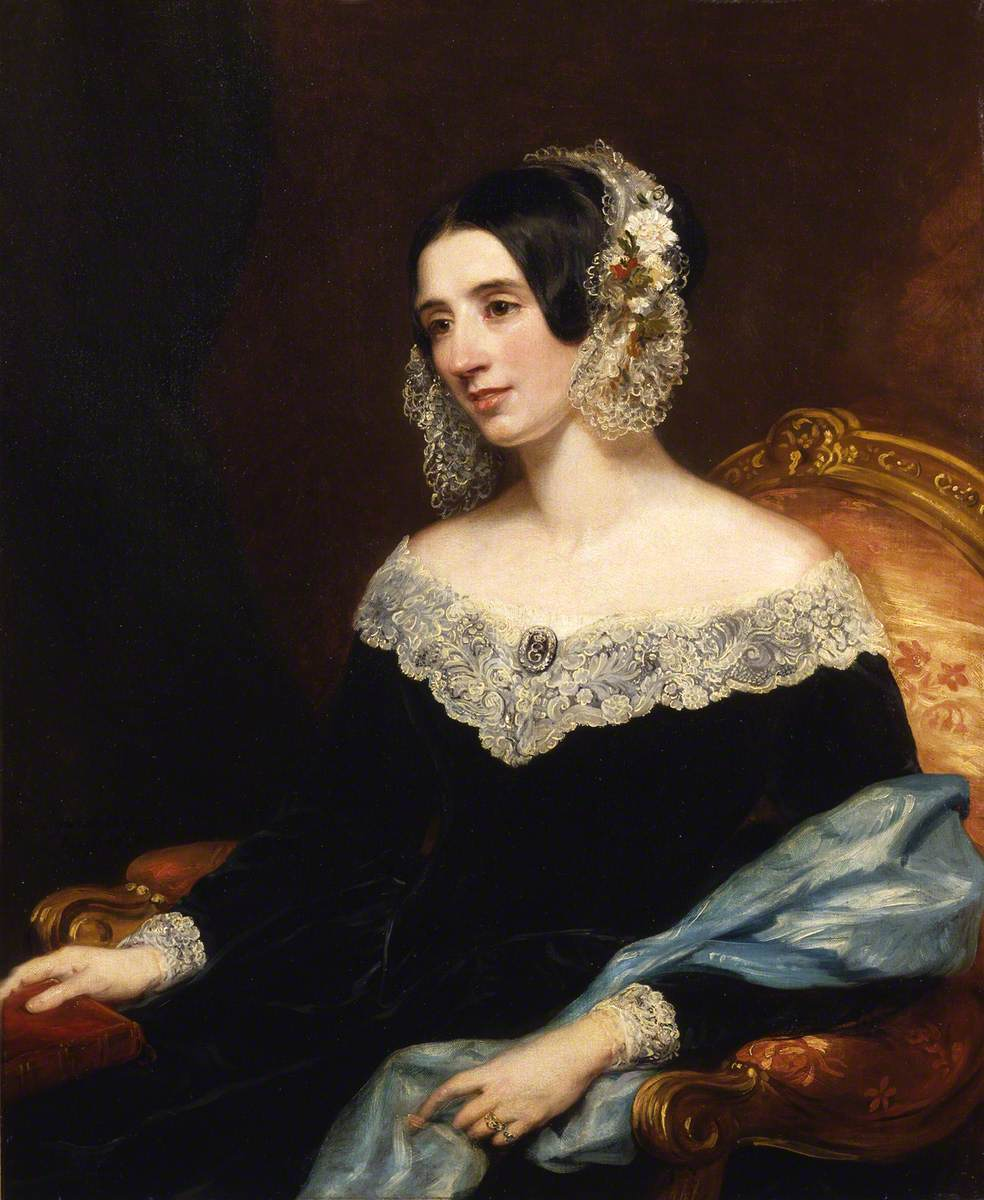
Henrietta Baillie by Margaret Sarah Carpenter

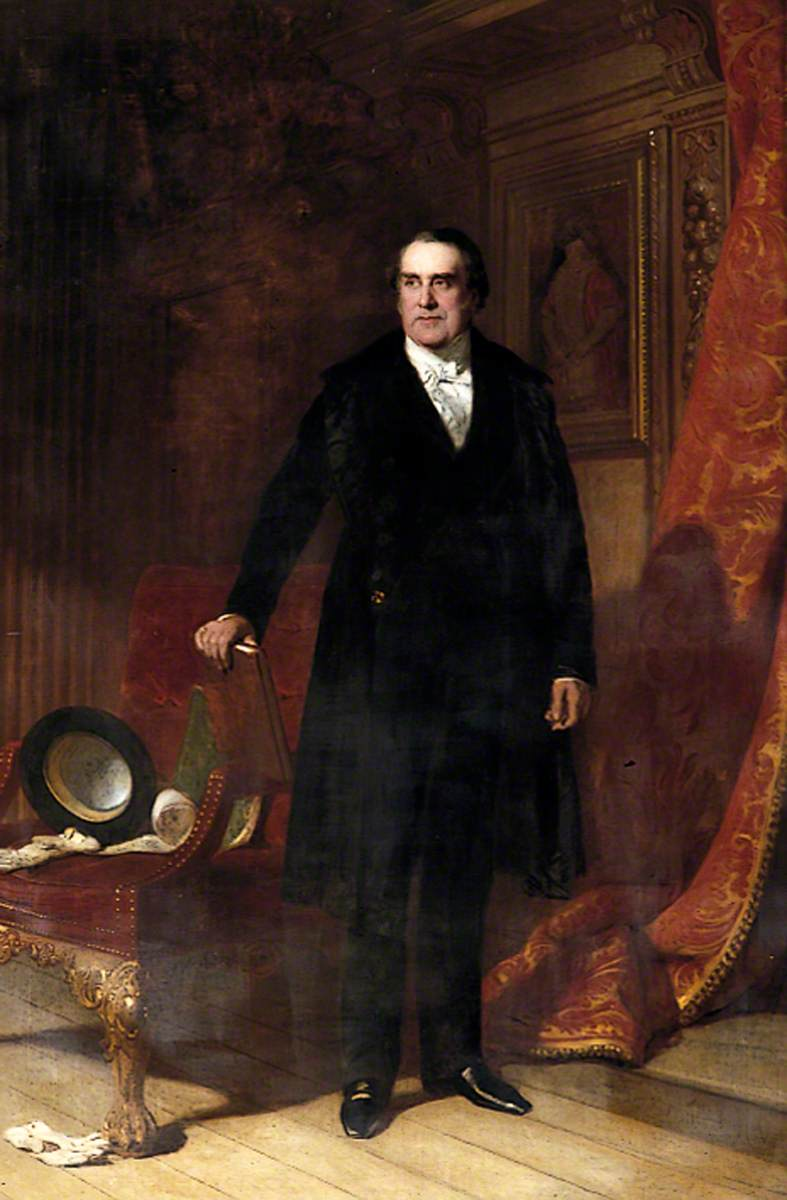
Richard Hotham Pigeon by John Prescott Knight

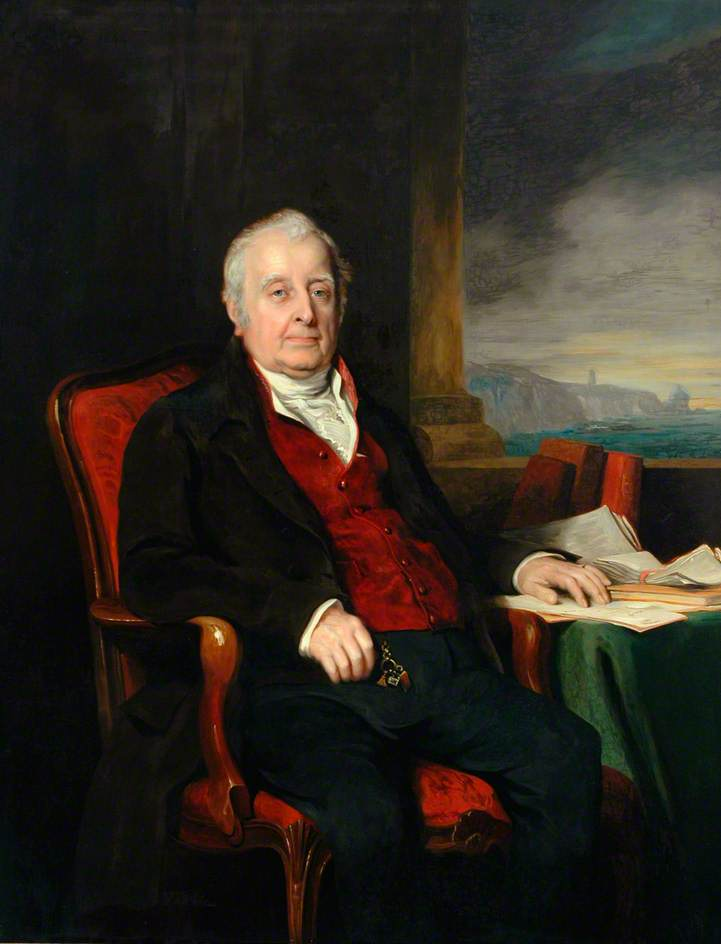
Abel Chapman by Andrew Morton

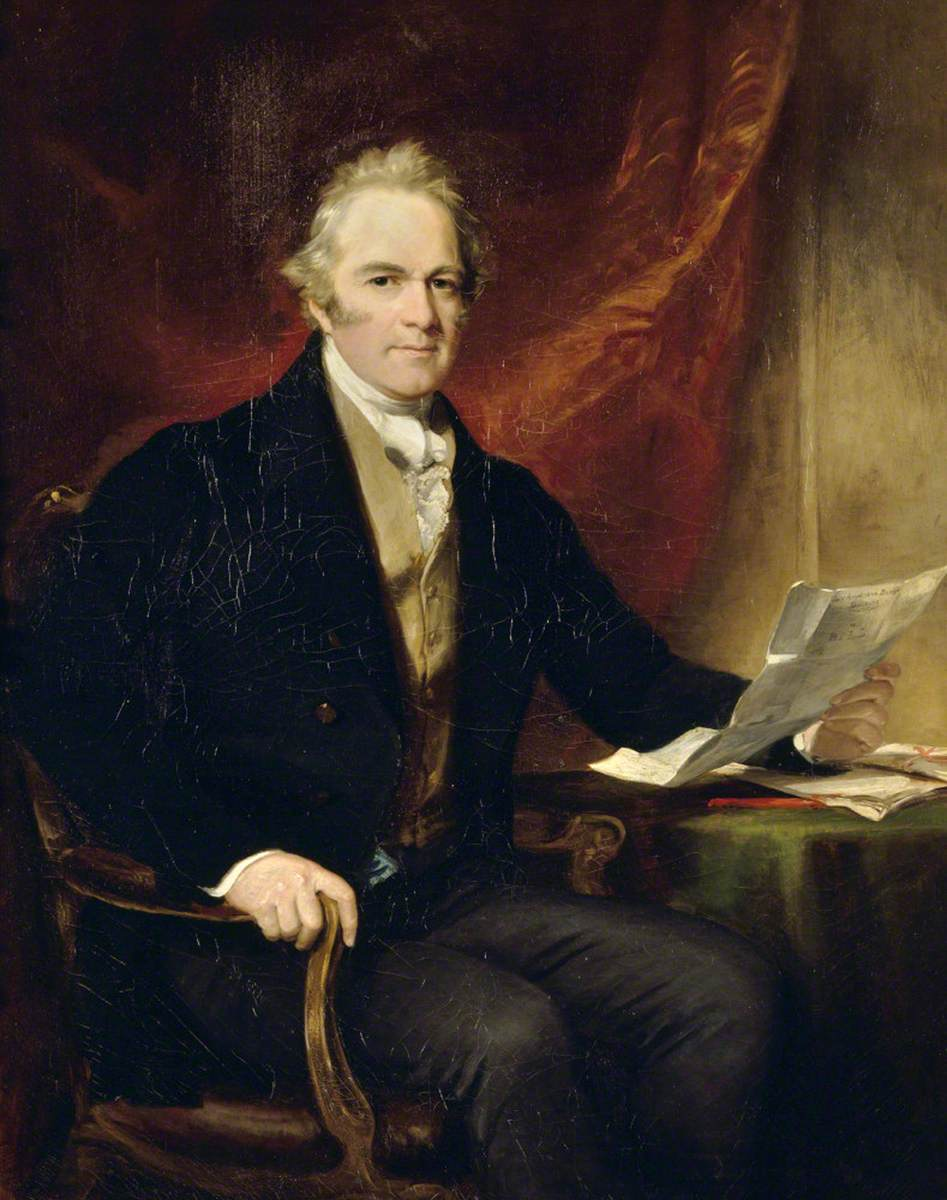
Earl of Powis by Francis Grant

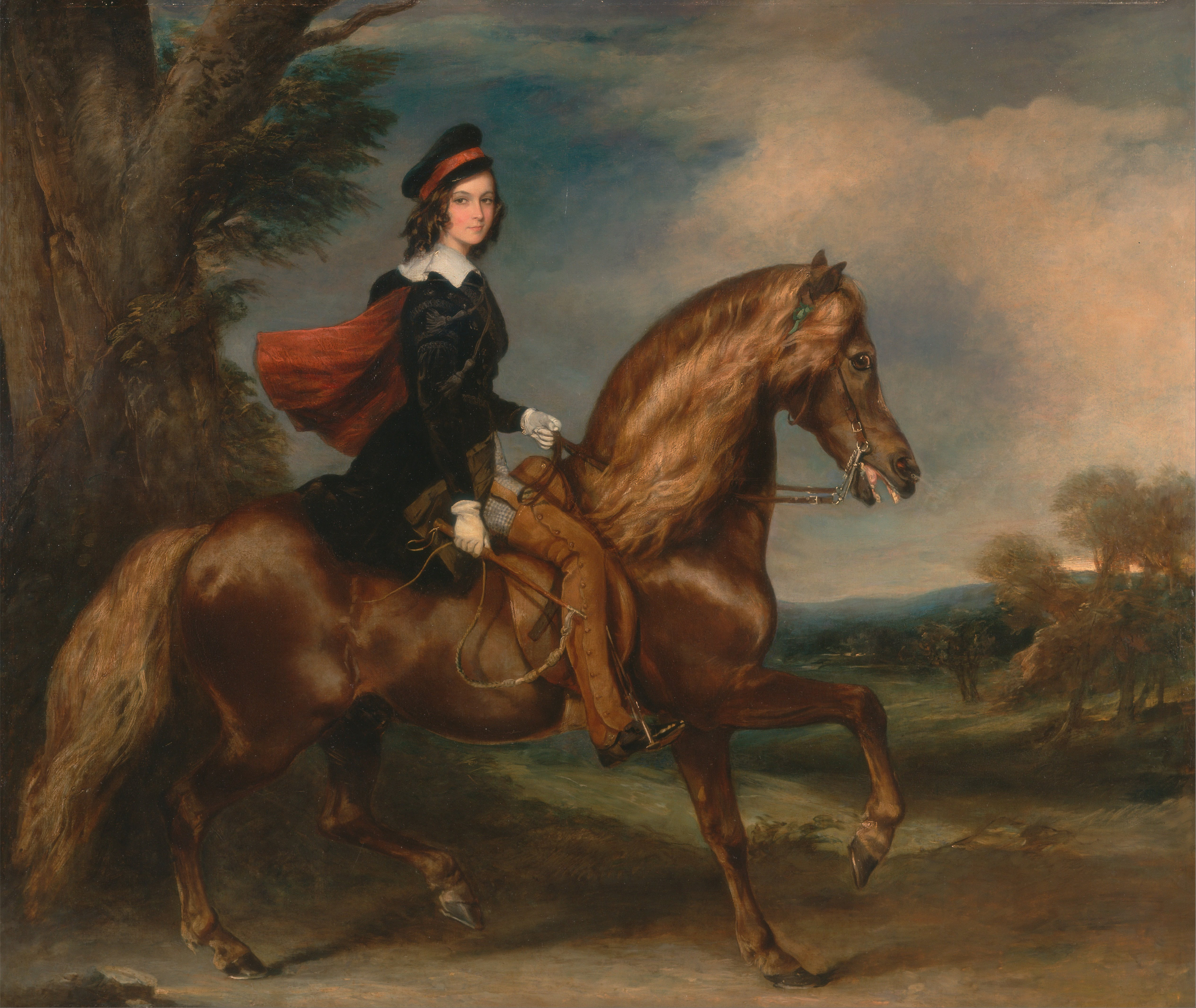
James Keith Fraser on His Pony by Francis Grant

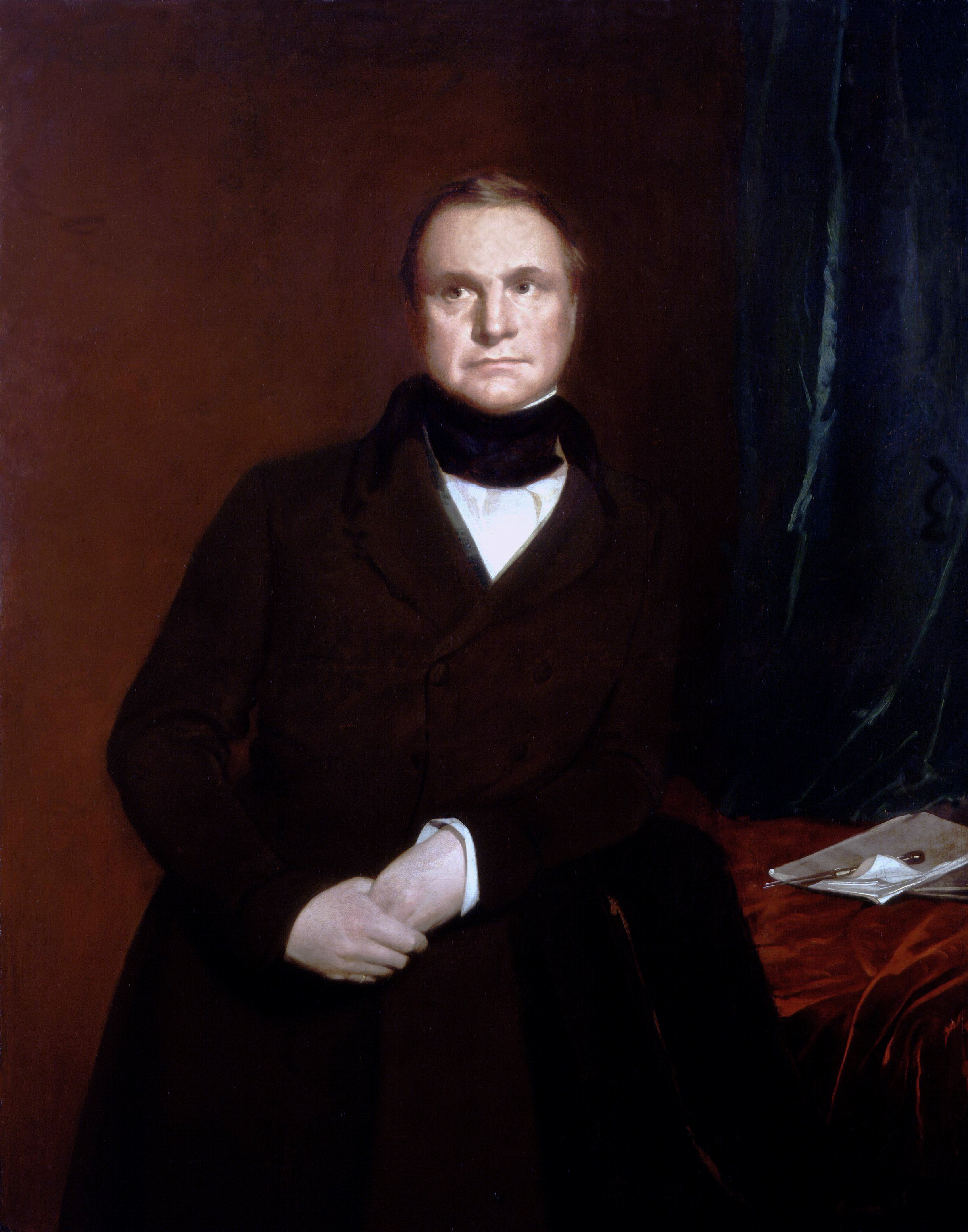
Charles Babbage by Samuel Laurence

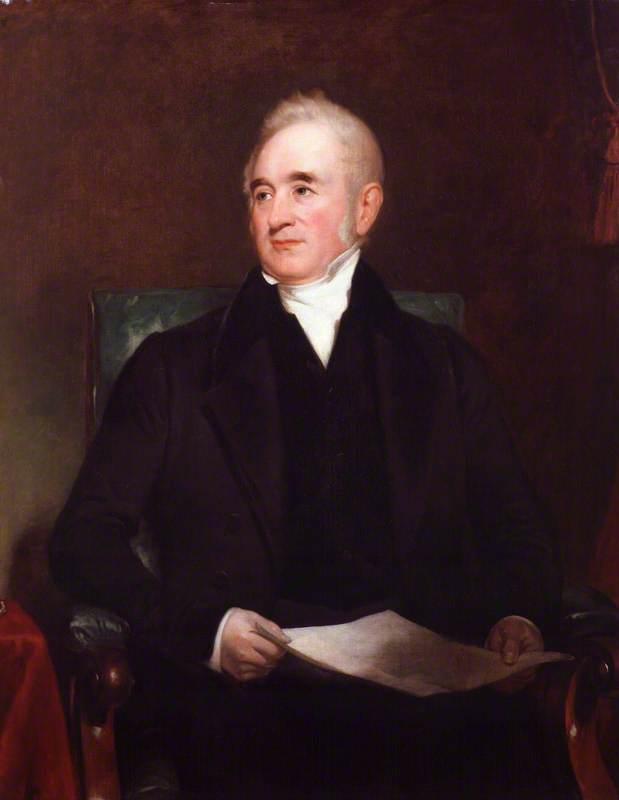
George Stephenson by Henry William Pickersgill

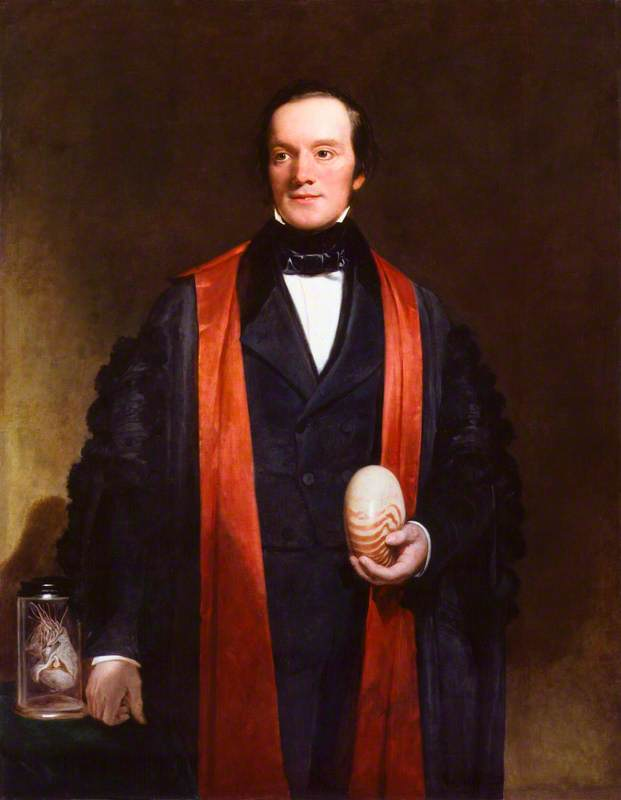
Richard Owen by Henry William Pickersgill

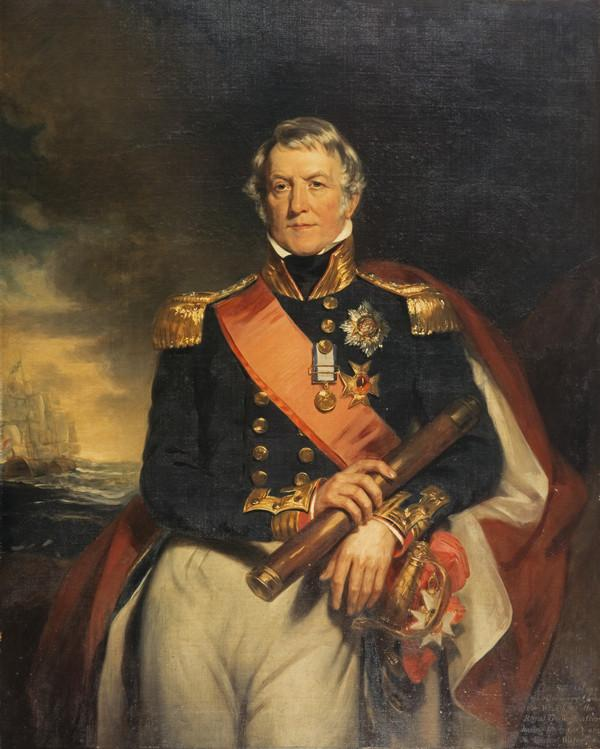
Philip Charles Durham by John Wood

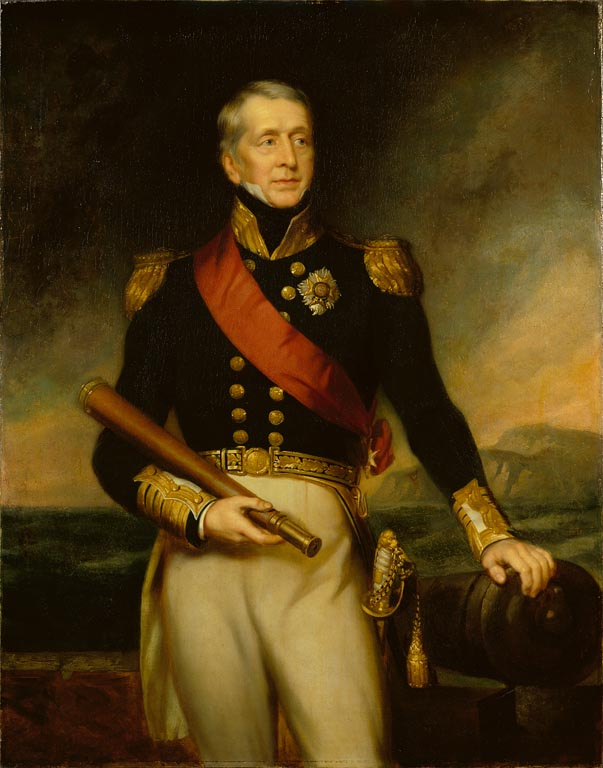
George Cockburn by John Lucas

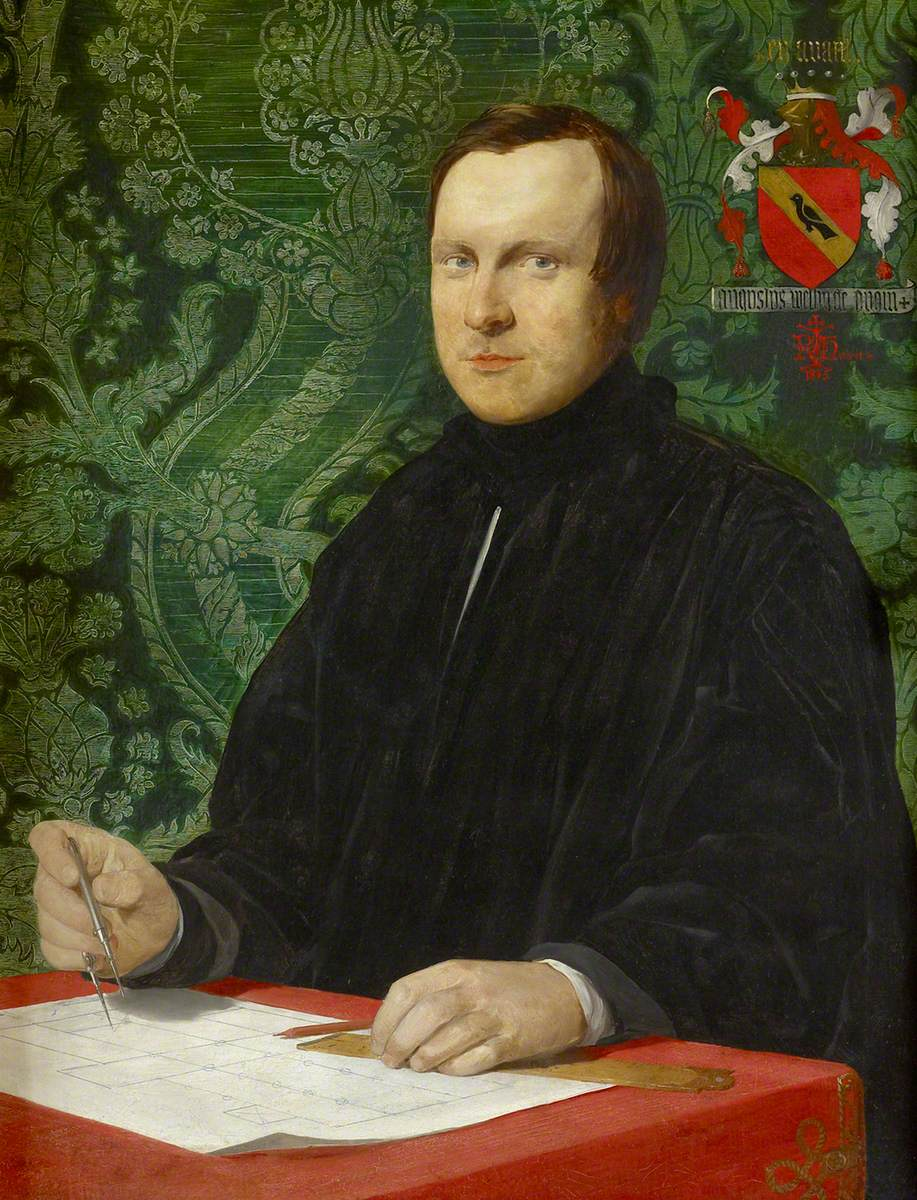
Augustus Pugin by John Rogers Herbert

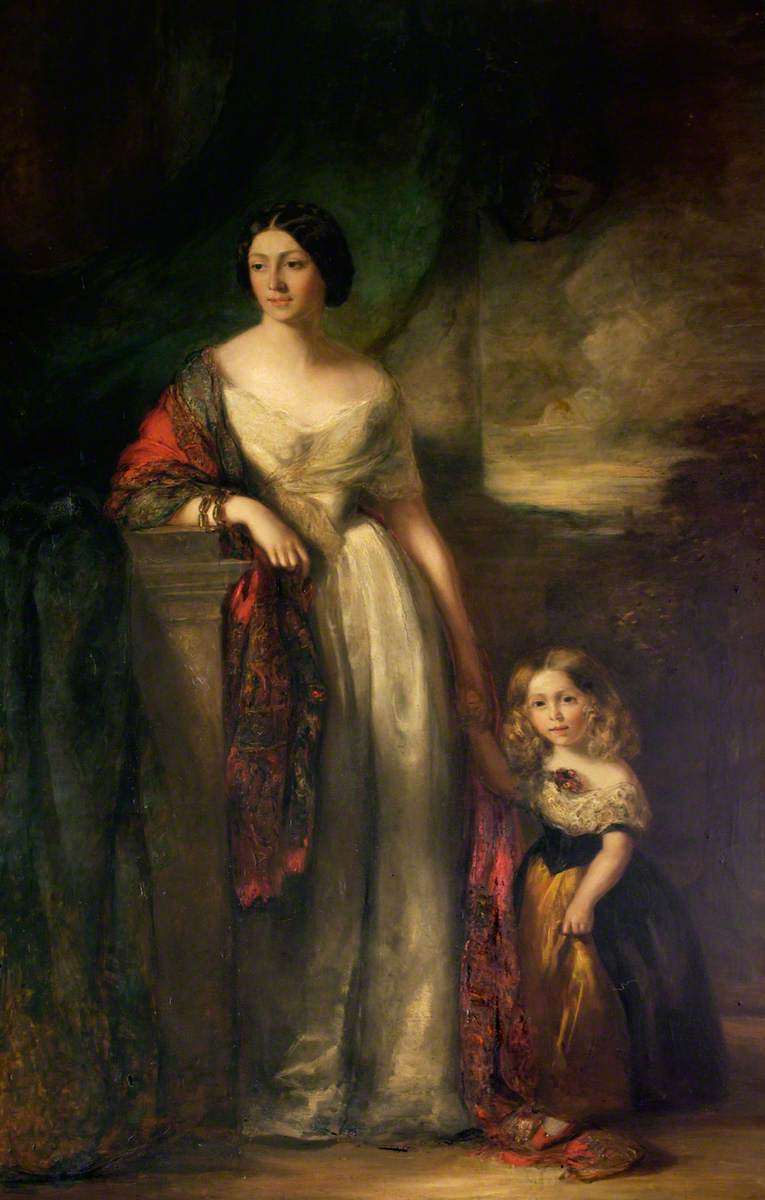
Lady de Tabley and Her Daughter by James Rannie Swinton

== See also ==
- Royal Academy Exhibition of 1844, the previous year's exhibition
- Salon of 1845, a contemporary French exhibition held at the Louvre in Paris

== Bibliography ==
- Bailey, Anthony. J.M.W. Turner: Standing in the Sun. Tate Enterprises Ltd, 2013.
- Hamilton, James. Turner - A Life. Sceptre, 1998.
- Hughes, Kathryn. The Victorian Governess. Bloomsbury, 2001.
- Tomlinson, Barbara. Commemorating the Seafarer: Monuments, Memorials and Memory. Boydell Press, 2015.
- Van der Merwe, Pieter & Took, Roger. The Spectacular Career of Clarkson Stanfield. Tyne and Wear County Council Museums, 1979.
