= Whalers (J. M. W. Turner) =

Painting by J. M. W. Turner

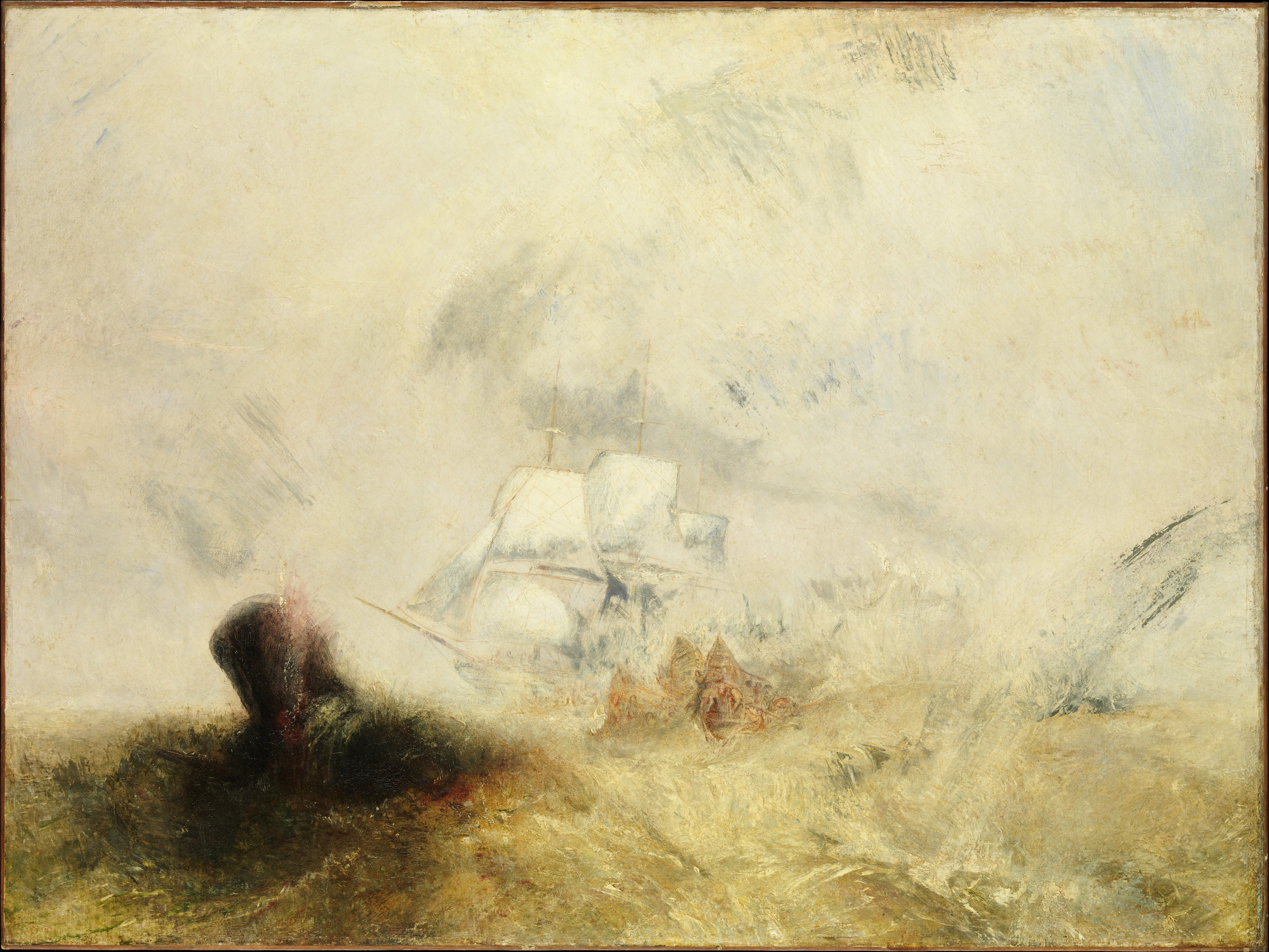
- Artist: J. M. W. Turner
- Year: c. 1845
- Medium: Oil on canvas
- Dimensions: 91.8 cm × 122.6 cm (36.1 in × 48.3 in)
- Location: Metropolitan Museum of Art, New York
- Accession: 96.29
- Website: www.metmuseum.org/art/collection/search/437854

Whalers is an 1845 painting by British artist J. M. W. Turner. Done in oil on canvas, the work depicts a whaling ship and her launches pursuing a whale. Originally created with the hope that collector Elhanan Bicknell would purchase it, the work is currently found in the collection of the Metropolitan Museum of Art. The painting was the centerpiece for the exhibition Turner’s Whaling Pictures at the Metropolitan Museum of Art in 2016.

The painting depicts a wounded sperm whale thrashing in a sea of foam and blood. In the background is a ghostly three-masted whaling vessel. The massive head of a wounded whale is breaking through the sea surface is to the left, its tail is seen in the froth to the right and a small boat is being tossed in the center foreground.

== Tate painting ==
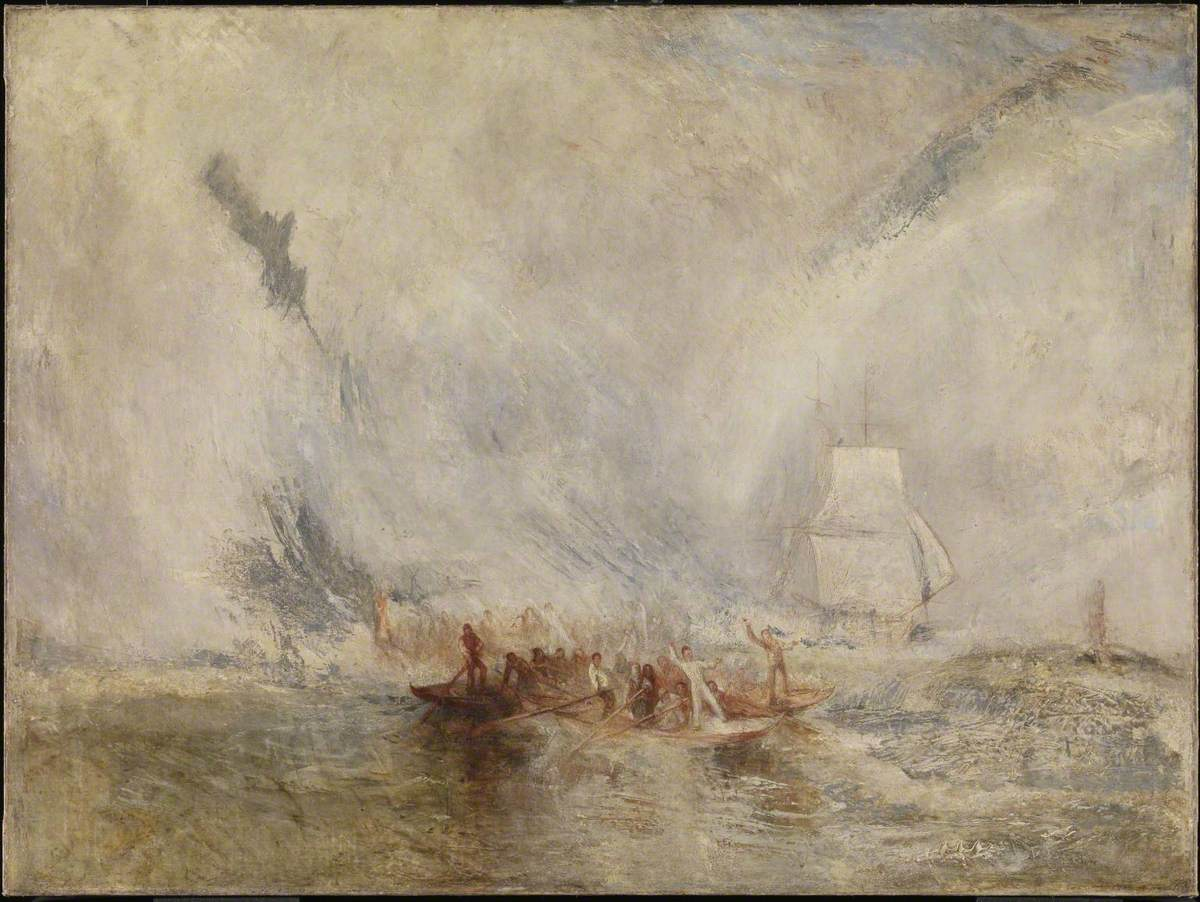
Whalers, 1845, Tate Gallery

It was one of two, different paintings of the same title that Turner displayed at the Royal Academy Exhibition of 1845 at the National Gallery in London the other formed part of the Turner Bequest of 1856 and is now in the Tate Britain. Turner had hopes to sell both works, as well a further two whaling-themed paintings displayed at the Royal Academy Exhibition of 1846, to the art collector Elhanan Bicknell who was in a wealthy investor in the waiting business. In the event Bicknell only bought one of them.

== See also ==
- List of paintings by J. M. W. Turner
