= 1845 in art =

Events from the year 1845 in art.

== Events ==
- February 7 – At the British Museum in London, a drunken visitor smashes the Portland Vase which takes months to repair. It has since been reconstructed three times.
- March – Honoré Daumier begins publishing the series of drawings Les Gens de justice ("The Men of Justice") in the satirical Paris magazine Le Charivari.
- March 15 – The Salon of 1845 opens at the Louvre in Paris
- April – The National Gallery in London purchases for £630 a portrait of a man with a skull as a work by Hans Holbein the Younger. Its authenticity is rapidly called into question, leading to a public scandal. It is determined in 1993 to have been painted more than a decade after Holbein's death, perhaps by Michiel Coxie.
- May 5 – The Royal Academy Exhibition of 1845 opens at the National Gallery in London.
- unknown dates
  - Heinrich Hoffmann anonymously publishes Lustige Geschichten und drollige Bilder mit 15 schön kolorierten Tafeln für Kinder von 3–6 Jahren ("Funny Stories and Whimsical Pictures with 15 Beautifully Coloured Panels for Children Aged 3 to 6", later known as Struwwelpeter) in Germany.
  - Brita Sofia Hesselius opens a photography studio in Karlstad, making her the first known Swedish female professional photographer.

== Works ==
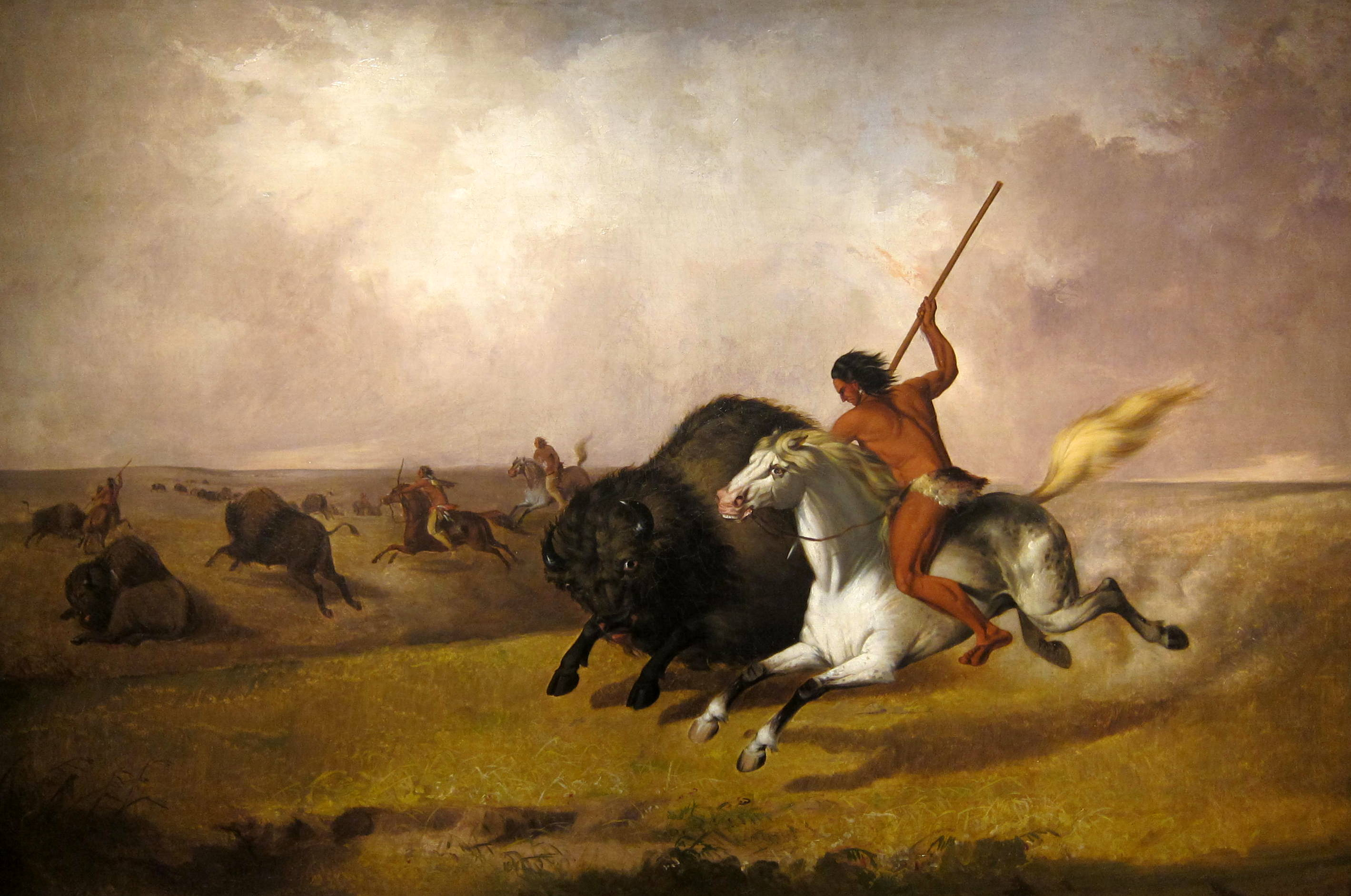
John Mix Stanley – Buffalo Hunt on the Southwestern Prairies

- Francis Grant – Self-Portrait
- George Hayter – The Christening of the Prince of Wales
- William Holman Hunt – Little Nell and Her Grandfather
- Jean Auguste Dominique Ingres – Portrait of Comtesse d'Haussonville
- Charles Landseer – The Eve of the Battle of Edgehill
- Edwin Landseer – The Cavalier's Pets
- Jan August Hendrik Leys – Franz Floris se rendant a une fête
- Adolph Menzel – The Balcony Room (Das Balkonzimmer)
- Andrew Morton – The United Service
- William Mulready – Choosing the Wedding Gown
- John Partridge – Portrait of Lord Palmerston
- Nicolaas Pieneman – Portrait of Jan Jacob Rochussen
- Édouard Pingret – The Arrival of King Louis Philippe at Windsor Castle
- William Ranney – The Battle of Cowpens
- Pierre-Henri Révoil completed by Michel Philibert Genod – Pharamond lifted on a shield by the Franks
- Théodore Rousseau – Hoarfrost
- Joseph Severn – Keats Listening to a Nightingale on Hampstead Heath
- Clarkson Stanfield – The Capture of the El Gamo
- John Mix Stanley – Buffalo Hunt on the Southwestern Prairies
- January Suchodolski – Assault on Saragossa
- J. M. W. Turner
  - The Arrival of Louis-Philippe at Portsmouth
  - Sunrise with Sea Monsters
- Thomas Webster – A Dame's School

== Births ==
- January 21 – Harriet Backer, Norwegian painter (died 1932)
- July 4 (probable date) – Edmonia Lewis, American sculptor (died 1907)
- October 1 – Adolf Oberländer, German caricaturist (died 1923)
- October 30 – Antonin Mercié, French sculptor and painter (died 1916)
- undated
  - Charles Burton Barber, English genre painter (died 1894)
  - Alina Forsman, Finnish sculptor (died 1899)

== Deaths ==
- January 4 – Léopold Boilly, French painter (born 1761)
- January 5 – Robert Smirke, English painter (born 1753)
- January 21 – Samuel Colman, English painter (born 1780)
- April 20 – Thomas Phillips, English portrait and subject painter (born 1770)
- May 15 – Kapiton Zelentsov, Russian painter notable for his illustrations for books (born 1790)
- July 29 – François Joseph Bosio, French sculptor (born 1769)
- September 29 – John Scarlett Davis, English painter (born 1804)
- October 30 – Nicolas Toussaint Charlet, French designer and painter, especially of military subjects (born 1792)
- November 24 – Karl Wilhelm Wach, German painter (born 1787)
- date unknown
  - Fryderyk Bauman, Polish architect and sculptor-decorator (born 1765/70)
  - Yakov Kolokolnikov-Voronin – Russian portraitist and icon-painter (born 1782)
- probable – Thomas Douglas Guest, British portrait painter (born 1781)
