= High Constabulary of the Port of Leith =

Scottish honorary society, formerly law enforcement

High Constabulary of the Port of Leith was founded in the late 17th century, to deal with safety in the royal port and behaviour in streets of the port of Leith near Edinburgh, Scotland. It continues to this day as a ceremonial port police organisation.

Known as Leith High Constables, the organisation is now an honorary society, supporting the City of Edinburgh Council and the monarchy.

The Leith High Constables continue in their own society with selected members, convened by a moderator for ceremonial attendance at events, raising charitable donations through annual dinners and other fundraising. There is a specific formal dress code including top-hats, tails, waistcoats and ceremonial batons, and more recently formal dress specified for women High Constables, similar to those of the other High Constables of Scotland, in Edinburgh and in Perth.

The official blazon (coat of arms) of the Leith High Constabulary was not awarded until 2014, by the Court of the Lord Lyon, and includes the coat of arms of Leith itself and the Leith motto 'PERSEVERE'.

== Purpose ==
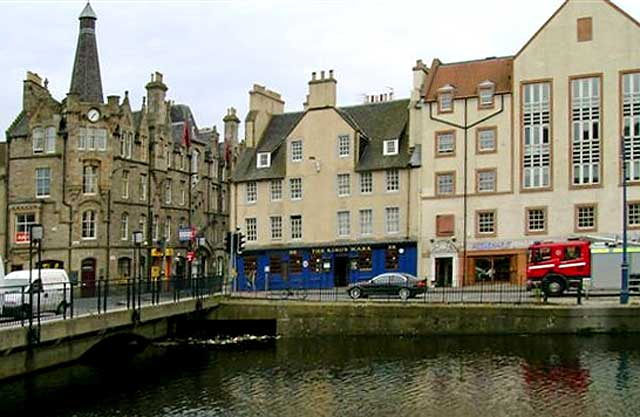
Modern view of King's Wark, Port of Leith

High Constables were first appointed in 1611, by the magistrates of the ancient Royal Port of Leith, similar to the Edinburgh High Constables were set up as a group to act together to uphold regulations on cleanliness and orderliness, keeping the peace, law and order. Being based in the port, the 50 High Constables here were also expected to stop any pirates or smugglers. High Constables had powers to arrest anyone outside after the night curfew, or found carrying weapons. Prior to a formal police service, Constables were expected to take control during any rioting, disorder, or in cases of bloodshed or even murder, on the streets within their jurisdiction. High Constables were selected and appointed by the baillies and later the Lord Provost. Sometimes, like in 1657, High Constables had to arrest people for breach of the Sabbath – in that case, the Leith bailiies 'bickering'.

=== Guard of Honour ===
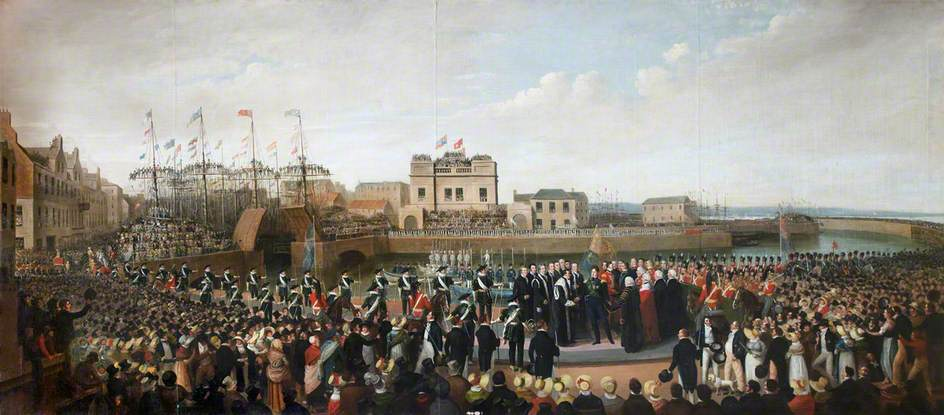
George IV Landing at Leith by Alexander Carse, 1822

On the occasion of George IV's arrival at the start of first royal visit by the reigning Monarch, in two centuries the Leith High Constables paraded when King George IV arrived at Leith Harbour. A large ceremonial portrayal of the occasion, was commissioned from Alexander Carse and was hung in the old Leith City Chambers, now occupied by the Leith branch of Police Scotland.

Leith High Constables were guard of honour along Leith Links during the later visit of Queen Victoria in 1842, when their contribution was praised to the Monarch by the Lord Provost: 'In consequence of the universal feeling of satisfaction and joy, which pervaded all classes, aided by the excellent arrangements of the High Constables and Moderators, the utmost regularity and good order prevailed;'

The High Constables would also attend with the Lord Provost at Remembrance Day wreath laying and services, and the annual Festival Parade.

Leith High Constables are providing a guard of honour to mark when the first trams to Leith and Newhaven, run again, after 70 years, on 7 June 2023. They are also part of the procession for the Honours of Scotland being presented to King Charles III and Queen Camilla at St. Giles Cathedral, Edinburgh on 5 July 2023.

=== Batons ===
The use of the Leith High Constables' ceremonial batons (being under 100 years old) was raised with Knife Crime Consultation Unit of the Scottish Executive, in July 2005, regarding the Criminal Justice Act 1988 (Offensive Weapons) (Scotland) Order 2005 (SSI 2005/483) paragraph 1(q) of the schedule, by the High Constables of Edinburgh requesting an amendment of the law to permit their use in the streets of the city.

1. Section 141 of the Criminal Justice Act 1988 (offensive weapons) shall apply to the following descriptions of weapons, other than weapons of those descriptions which are antiques for the purposes of this Schedule:

[...]

(q) a straight, side handled or friction lock truncheon (sometimes known as a baton).

=== Social events ===
As well as an annual dinner, there was a long standing annual excursion sometimes 'in concert' with the High Constables of Edinburgh for example, in 1859 on a visit to Melrose and in 1861 going to the Falls of Clyde.

== Members and office bearers (past and present) ==
In 1907-8 the Leith High Constables Office bearers were:

Moderator John Herdman,

Vice-Moderator John Inglis,

Treasurer James Galloway,

Chaplain John T. Ramage,

Custodier Charles Sanderson,

Surgeon O.H. Garland, M.D., FRCPE,

Secretary George. P. Gallloway, S.S.C., 33 Bernard Street, Leith

In 1972, a former Moderator of Leith High Constables, Andrew Dick Wood published a history of the organisation up to the 1960s. In 1975, John Bottomley became both the Swedish Consul and a High Constable of Leith.

In 1988, the Leith High Constables were photographed being inspected by Prince Philip, the Duke of Edinburgh as they lined Leith Docks, during a Royal Visit.

In 2004, the Edinburgh High Constables (including those from Leith) escorted Her Majesty Queen Elizabeth II from the City Chambers, down the Royal Mile High Street in the parade for the opening of the Scottish Parliament.

In 2019 & 2020 the Leith High Constables Officer bearers and members, had their annual dinner on the Royal Yacht Britannia.

== Further information about Leith Police ==
The history of the Port of Leith and the City of Edinburgh developed separately with Leith becoming a Burgh in 1833, and then, despite local opposition, amalgamating with Edinburgh in 1920. The High Constables were collaborating to resolve criminal and civil disorderly behaviour in the streets of the capital or the nearby burgh of Leith, and the in-between areas, for some two hundred years before the establishment of the current statutory Police Services.

The Burgh of Leith Police was founded in 1859, and has a challenging tongue twister associated with it, 'the Leith Police dismisseth us' appropriately used as a test for sobriety not only in Leith, but as far afield as Australia, as described for example, for use when blood tests could not be taken in 1937.
