= John Gurwood =

British Army officer

John Gurwood CB
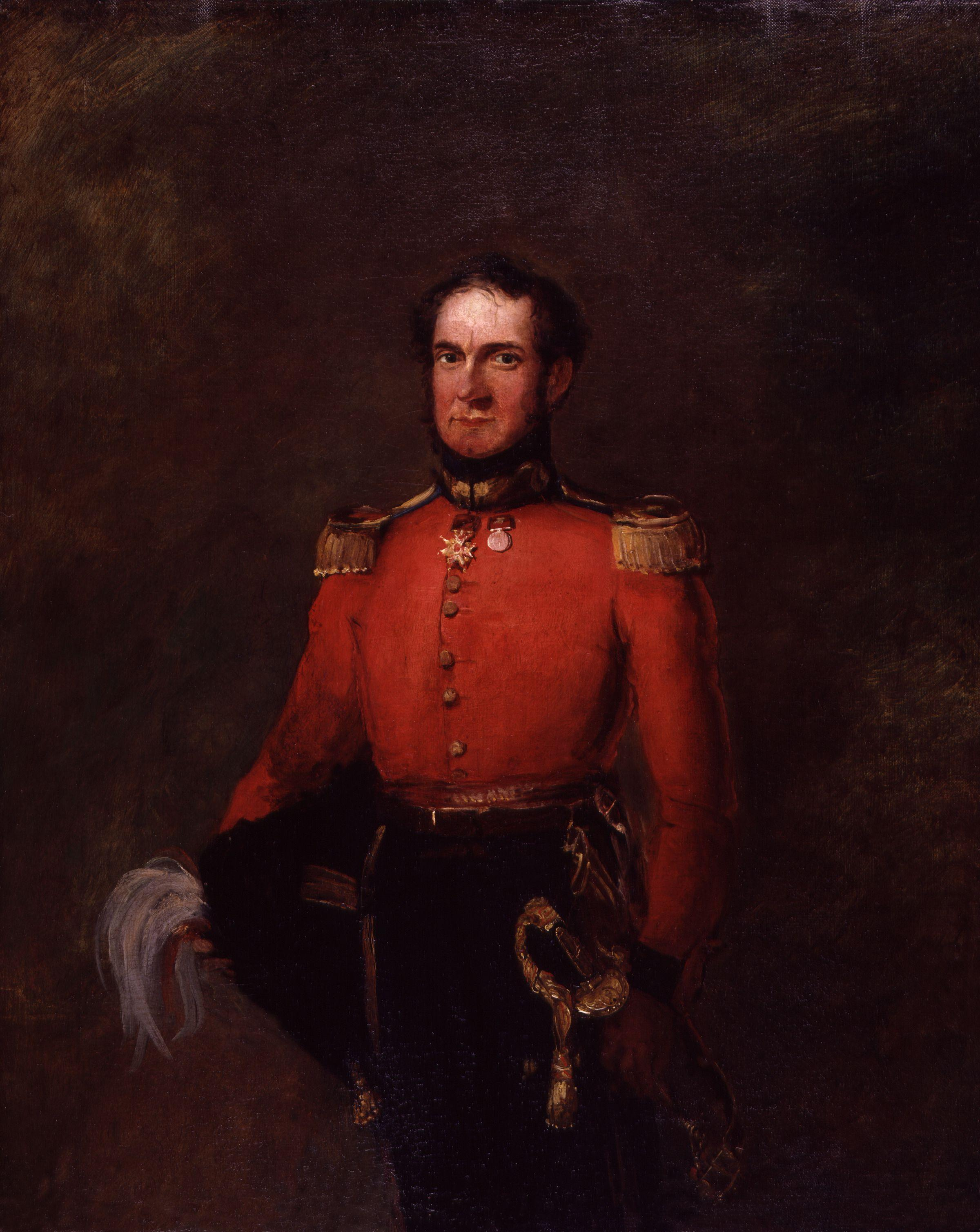
- Portrait of Gurwood by William Salter, 1834–1840
- Born: 7 April 1788; Hoddesdon
- Died: 27 December 1845 (aged 57); London
- Military career
- Allegiance: United Kingdom
- Branch: British Army
- Service years: 1808–1845
- Rank: Colonel
- Conflicts: Napoleonic Wars; Peninsular War; Battle of Vimeiro; Combat of the Côa; Battle of Bussaco; Battle of Pombal; Battle of Redinha; Battle of Casal Novo; Battle of Foz de Arouce; Battle of Sabugal (WIA); Siege of Ciudad Rodrigo (WIA); Battle of Vitoria; Battle of Nivelle; Battle of the Nive; Battle of Orthez; Battle of Toulouse; Hundred Days; Battle of Waterloo (WIA)
- Memorials: St Paul's Cathedral

Colonel John Gurwood CB (7 April 1788 – 27 December 1845) was a British Army officer who published the dispatches of the Duke of Wellington which form a major contribution to military history.

== Early life ==
John Gurwood was born on 7 April 1788 in Hoddesdon, Hertfordshire. His father, Richard Gurwood, was born in Langton, Yorkshire and his mother, Marisco Jay, came from Essex. The couple had a son, Richard Jay, in 1782 but did not marry until October 1787. Richard Gurwood died in October 1791. He had almost certainly been a London merchant, his will describes him as 'Esquire of Hoddesdon', and he left a substantial sum to his wife and two sons and a small estate at Langton to John.

Marisco Jay married Henry Okey in May 1796 and the family seem then to have lived in Hackney. The Okeys had two children: Charles born in May 1797; and Marisco born in June 1798. John had a close relationship with his mother and became extremely fond of his stepfather and of Charles and Marisco.

== Military life ==
=== Service in the Peninsula ===
Gurwood may have started work in a merchant's office but on 30 March 1808 he enlisted as an ensign in the 52nd (Oxfordshire) Regiment of Foot, a decision he said was strongly opposed by his mother. It was a non-purchase commission received on the recommendation of Lord Charles Somerset who wrote of Gurwood in February 1812 that he was 'a young officer in whose welfare I have always been much interested, and for whom I procured his first commission.'

Gurwood served in the Peninsula from August 1808 to June 1812 taking part in the battle for Ciudad Rodrigo, the Combat of the Coa, the fight for Badajoz, and the battle at Sabugal, where he was severely wounded in the leg. At Ciudad Rodrigo on 19 January 1812 he took part in the forlorn hope in the lesser breach. Despite being wounded in the head, he gained the rampart and, guided by a French officer whom he saved from being threatened by British soldiers, made his way with his men to the citadel and took the surrender of the governor in customary fashion by receiving his sword. Gurwood escorted the governor and his party to Wellington, who then presented Gurwood with the Governor's sword. It was the proudest moment of Gurwood's life.

Officers who survived a Forlorn Hope expected promotion especially if, like Gurwood, they had been mentioned in dispatches. Gurwood was much too junior to be promoted within his own regiment and was made captain in the Royal African Corps. This was a decidedly inferior regiment and Gurwood tried to exchange into the 1st Regiment of Foot Guards. This was not allowed, again because he was not senior enough, but he then obtained permission to make an exchange into the 9th Light Dragoons where he became brigade-major. He returned to England to sort out his financial affairs now he was of age, was befriended by the Napier family, and was made ADC to Lord Charles Somerset who made him known to the Duke of York and presented him at Court. Gurwood returned to the Peninsula in December 1812 and on 17 January 1813 acted as Esquire when Wellington knighted Sir Charles Stuart on the orders of the Prince Regent. From this time he was frequently in Wellington's company. He fought in the battle of Vitoria in June 1813 and was sent to keep order in the town which was being subjected to extensive plundering and looting. He and his brigade then took part in the long campaign up through Spain and France.

After three months leave in England, Gurwood went to Brussels in August 1814 having been appointed ADC to Sir Henry Clinton, who was second in command to the Prince of Orange in the Netherlands. When the news broke that Napoleon had escaped from Elba and Sir Henry was ordered to remove immediately to Tournai. In the hurry and confusion Gurwood offended Clinton and felt obliged to resign as ADC. He rejoined the 10th Hussars to which he had transferred in 1814 and served with them at Waterloo, where his horse was killed under him and he was wounded in the knee.

=== Service in Britain ===
At the end of 1815 Gurwood joined his Regiment for embarkation to England where they were quartered in Brighton and then in Eastbourne. He was still a regimental captain and very aware that his promotion prospects were severely reduced by the peace. Officer promotions in the British Army were customarily made by purchase except in time of war when vacancies occurred because of death or wounds. The sums involved were considerable but could be offset by selling the previous rank. However officers could not sell non-purchase commissions which left them constantly having to find larger and larger sums. Gurwood knew that he would have to press immediately for further non-purchase promotions on the basis of his active service. He asked both his superior Colonel Quentin and Sir Henry Torrens at Horse Guards to speak on his behalf to the Prince Regent who was the colonel of the regiment, and had the opportunity in Brighton to speak to the Prince personally. He was repeatedly subjected to the Prince's whims and changes of mind but was eventually gazetted brevet major in March 1817.

In 1818 he went the 10th Hussars to Bristol and in 1819 to Edinburgh. He was at this time extremely concerned about the plight of the common soldiers who were discharged into a country that had run up an enormous national debt in order to pay for the war, that was experiencing catastrophic harvests, and that was suffering severe outbreaks of disease most notably typhus. Like other officers he assisted men who had served under him by giving them money and helping them to make a case for receiving a pension, and by finding them paid positions. While in Edinburgh he wrote a long analysis of the Regulations under which soldiers could receive pensions and he pressed both Lord Fitzroy Somerset and the Duke of Wellington to draw it to the attention of Lord Palmerston, the Secretary at War. The reply was that the pension fund was oversubscribed, the Duke admitting to Gurwood that the interests of common soldiers had suffered from a 'lavish liberality extended towards officers.'

Gurwood again became discouraged about the possibility of progressing in his profession and he was also very distressed by the death of his mother in January 1820. He was allowed to go on half pay provided he exchanged into the West India Regiment, and obtained three months leave of absence. He went to Paris where in the spring of 1823 he was asked by his friend Sir Charles Stuart, the British Ambassador in Paris, to take some dispatches to Sir William A'Court, the British Ambassador in Spain. He carried out the mission and then travelled round Spain which was in turmoil following the revolt which had forced Ferdinand VII to restore the liberal constitution of 1812. On the suggestion of Sir Charles Stuart Gurwood wrote a long report describing and analysing the situation.

At some time in 1823 Gurwood met Finette Mayer (née Kreilsamner) in Paris. She had married Lazare Mayer in Lyon on 22 October 1813 and they had a daughter Eugenie in June 1814. Finette was no longer living with her husband and she and Gurwood formed a relationship. Their daughter, Adele Marisco Rodrigua Gurwood, was born in Paris in early September 1826.

In 1825 Gurwood accompanied Sir Charles Stuart on a mission to Lisbon and Brazil. Before he left he thought that he had secured promotion only to find that his name was once again not in the Gazette. Finally in 1827 he accepted the appointment of deputy adjutant general in 19th Regiment of Foot with the brevet rank of lieutenant colonel and left to join the regiment in Barbados. Postings to the West Indies were notoriously unhealthy and he asked his friend Mrs Fitzherbert to look after Finette and his daughter if he should die.

== Literary career ==
=== The General Orders ===
Gurwood took with him to the West Indies Wellington's General Orders and Regulations evidently with the aim of producing a shortened edition. Wellington issued his Orders daily to the army and his clarity and attention to detail contributed enormously to the efficiency of operations. They covered all aspects of military life from the issue and maintenance of equipment to the care of horses and baggage animals, from men's rations to forage for animals, from the weight to be carried to the distances to be marched. In the end they amounted to seven printed volumes. Gurwood removed the many entries relating to courts martial and then re-ordered the rest under headings listed in alphabetical order, the whole being reduced to one volume. The Duke gave his permission for publication and the book appeared in September 1832. His friend Charles Arbuthnot reported that the Duke was so delighted with reading his old orders that he did nothing else all day but read them aloud. The first edition of 1000 copies sold so well that a second edition was soon in preparation.

Much of the work on the General Orders was done in Portsmouth where Gurwood was posted in 1830 as major of brigade in the South West District. Finette and Adele, who had been living in Paris, were at last able to join him, and Fanny (as Finette was known in England) must now have been widowed because she and Gurwood were married at St Martins in the Fields on 18 November 1834.

In early April 1835 the Duke, as Foreign Secretary, sent Lord Eliot on a mission to Spain and asked Gurwood to accompany him. The two men were chosen for their fluent French and Spanish and for their understanding of the country and its politics. The First Carlist War had broken out in 1833 on the death of Ferdinand VII and the British Government, which did not take sides, was horrified by the summary execution of prisoners by both armies. The mission managed to make contact with both sides including with Tomas di Zamalcarregui, the Basque general on the Carlist faction with which Gurwood was more in political sympathy. They secured a signed Convention on the fair treatment of prisoners and the wounded but, sadly, this lasted only a few months.

Gurwood and Fanny had a second daughter in July 1835. She was called Zumala Mary Emily in memory of the Carlist general who had died in June. Gurwood again pressed for promotion, no doubt needing a bigger income to meet family responsibilities. When he was unsuccessful he considered leaving the service but decided to continue with the posting in Portsmouth.

=== The Indian Dispatches ===
Gurwood had been thinking about editing the Duke's Dispatches for some time and spelt out his idea at breakfast at Stratfield Saye in January 1832 when the conversation turned on Sir William Napier's History of the War in the Peninsula. The Duke made no reply but Gurwood prepared a paper which was presented to the Duke in January 1833. This proposed that the whole of the Dispatches 'from Ahmednuggur and Assaye to Waterloo and Paris' should be arranged in chronological order. Some material relating to the Indian campaigns would be added to explain 'the vast importance of the victories and successes of General Wellesley', but the 'dispatches from the Peninsula, require no such explanatory introduction.' The Duke replied on 13 January that he had not the smallest objection to what Gurwood proposed to do. If Gurwood would come over on any day in the next two weeks he would be delighted to see him.

Gurwood started work straight away and by the autumn was in regular correspondence with the Duke who was clearly much enthused by the project. The Duke was determined that history should not be rewritten, and told Gurwood to compile the work only from public documents and not to make any corrections. The work quickly became much bigger than Gurwood had envisaged; in addition to the official dispatches it now included the many letters exchanged between the Duke to fellow officers and subordinates. Finding the papers was not an easy matter. Some came easily to hand in bound letter books but much was in loose documents not easily located in the Duke's houses. The Duke entered willingly into the search, in August 1834 spending 'three days in a diligent search for the papers you require.' Gurwood wrote round to known recipients of the Duke's letters asking if they had copies, and also found references within documents which prompted further searches. 'The work grows with its growth' he wrote to the Duke. In these circumstances it was extremely difficult for Gurwood to maintain control over the contents of the volumes, in particular maintaining the objective of arranging the papers in date order. Much relevant matter was found too late, as in July 1834 when the Duke sent Gurwood packets of letters that should have gone into Volume I which was already in print.

The Duke was involved at every stage of the publishing process reading all the documents, and approving printer's sheets and final proofs. The question of names and material to be omitted came up very early over the statement by Sir Jasper Nicolls that Wellesley had hanged 10 -15 men, the Duke feeling that this would shock readers 'in these times of impunity for thieves and vagabonds.' Omissions continued to be an issue throughout with Gurwood making suggestions, and the Duke himself initiating deletions, in April 1834 for example striking out 'some words referring to the jealousies between Baird and me' on the grounds that 'Long before he died he and I were on he very best terms.' Gurwood marked up possible omissions for the Duke's consideration but it was the Duke who had the final approval of all inclusions and omissions.

Volume I came out in May 1834. Lord Mahon dined at Apsley House on 18 May and reported that the Duke was much amused at reading it: 'the energy and activity are quite as great then as afterwards. I don't think that I could write better now, after all my experience.' Volumes II and III came out in March 1835. Volume III was a supplementary volume containing papers that had come to light since the first two were prepared. Indeed, there was so much new material that Gurwood considered producing a second edition with the documents in their correct date order and running to a fourth volume. The booksellers were pressing for a reprint as the first edition was sold out. He decided in the end to issue three new volumes with all the papers, including much new material, placed in date order. His explanatory notes were excised, and the contents consisted only of letters written by the Duke with a few letters written to the Duke retained as (sometimes lengthy) footnotes. Volumes I - 3 of the New Edition were published in 1837.

=== The Peninsula Dispatches ===
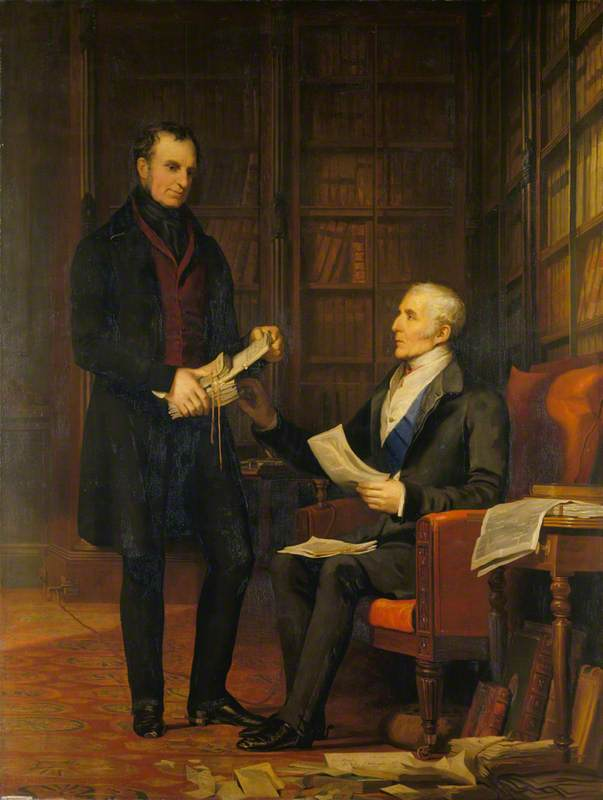
The Duke of Wellington with Colonel Gurwood at Apsley House by Andrew Morton, 1840

Gurwood moved straight on to editing the papers relating to the Peninsula War and there was no suggestion this time that the papers should be only those in the public domain. Progress was slowed at first by the Duke's political commitments and by Gurwood's mission to Spain. There was a further serious consideration: the Duke was concerned about the consequences of publishing material relating to such recent events and to persons still living. When he returned corrected pages to Gurwood on 30 July 1835 he commented that they were as interesting as those about India but doubted the expediency of publishing them. He had cut out some parts and needed to look again at others otherwise he would 'certainly be involved in a Controversy with Nations as well as Individuals which will not be an agreeable pastime in my old age.' He was in addition confronted with the issue of the Convention of Cintra where he had known that he 'was the object of party violence, that the wish and intention of the Party at that time was to have a victim and that I was the Person fixed upon.'

Gurwood replied on 1 August engaging directly with the Duke's concerns. He wrote that it was because the dispatches related to such important events as well as to the Duke's character and fame that the exact truth should be told: 'posterity' would otherwise be led into error 'by the imagination of historians.' As to the truths that might give offence to nations or individuals, they could 'with a diligent exercise of caution, under your Grace's guidance, be omitted as the general will supply ample authority.' No-one felt a stronger desire than he did to 'place the monument of truth before the world' but he would always regret 'occasioning any trouble or uneasiness to your Grace in so doing.' He suggested three possibilities: to continue publication under the Duke's direction; to continue printing and to deposit the whole with the Duke for private consumption; to discontinue the project altogether.

Gurwood knew that he was being extremely presumptuous in writing this letter. The Duke seems not to have sent a written reply but it is a sign of his respect for Gurwood's abilities that the first option was followed and the project continued. Volume IV (the first of those on the Peninsula War) was published at the end of 1835 and John Murray, the publisher, told Gurwood that there was already much interest in the next volume.

As with the Indian volumes there were problems in locating papers and there was a particular problem with the year from December 1809 for which the Duke's papers had been lost in a shipwreck in the Tagus. Gurwood made strenuous and prolonged efforts to obtain papers from a wide range of the Duke's correspondents writing, often several times, to individuals or their descendants. He made a number of searches in official collections, including the Inspector General's office at the Ordnance and the Commander in Chief's Office, and he wrote to Lisbon to ask for a search for the Duke's letters to Admiral Berkeley which were believed to be in the Portuguese War Office.

Some people were very keen to see references to themselves in print but others were unhappy about it. Lord Clarendon said that he wished to be helpful but had been hurt by his depiction in Napier's History. The Duke assured him that there would be nothing that did not redound to his credit, and that they could rely on Gurwood not to publish 'any thing affecting any individual or events public which should not be published'. Lord Clarendon was not the only one to smart under Napier's strictures and to worry about further damage to their reputations. Gurwood told Duke in May 1836 that 'almost every person who has assisted me in the compilation has made, or suggested, stipulations.' The Duke himself continued to be concerned about the inclusion of material, in December 1835 arguing for the omission of two letters that he had written in August 1809 to Lord Wellesley and Lord Castlereagh saying that the indiscipline and ineffectiveness of the Spanish army had resulted in his withdrawing from co-operation with it. Both letters were 'very good and true as Gospel, but I fear I shall never be forgiven the publication of them.' Gurwood replied to the Duke that he feared to decide where the Duke had doubts but said that the letters would be a great loss to history and would entail the omission of others of a like tenor. He took the liberity to refer the letters back to the Duke for reconsideration; the letters appear in Volume 5.

The Duke and Gurwood worked extremely well together, both of them demonstrating the efficiency and determination that the Duke famously described as his rule to 'do the business of the day in the day.' The volumes were produced at great speed and despite being very busy the Duke turned the material round quickly sometimes apologising for not being more prompt. Every entry had to be examined and approved by him both several times through to proof and print stage, with his being the final word. This involved Gurwood in much laborious copying out especially because Duke wanted to be assured at all times that the papers, whether with Gurwood or at Clowes the printers, were secure so that his emendations did not get into the public domain.

As was customary at this time it was Gurwood who was solely financially responsible for all the expenses of publication. Clowes, the printers, kept accounts of their expenses which included advertising, stock control and distribution, and remitted any profits to Gurwood. In May 1838 the Duke sent Gurwood a draft for £500 to cover the cost of the free copies that Gurwood had given to his friends and relations. Gurwood declined the offer though he admitted that he had yet to gain by the publication. In December 1838 however he was able to tell the Duke that the expenses had been met from the sales. For the next three years Clowes remitted substantial sums to Gurwood.

On the publication of Volume 12 in November 1838 Gurwood wrote to the Duke that when he began the work he had not been aware of its 'magnitude and importance' and he expressed his thanks for 'the confidence reposed in me by your Grace in permitting me to undertake the Compilation'. The Duke replied congratulating Gurwood on bringing 'before the Publick a Work which must be useful to Statesmen and Soldiers as containing the details of important Political and Military operations of many years duration.'

=== Further publications ===
The Dispatches were from the beginning a great success not just with those in politics and the military but also with general readers. There were however complaints that, at a guinea (£1 1s) for each unbound volume, they were too expensive. There was also some feeling that the work was too long. Gurwood therefore set out immediately to produce a one volume Selections which was published in April 1841. A French translation was published in Brussels in 1843.

Gurwood was never one of the Duke's secretaries, but he did undertake some private work for him in 1841 and 1842 on problems that had arisen with the estates given to the Duke by the Spanish Government, and with the annual subvention that the Portuguese Government had granted in lieu of an estate.

Gurwood was also busy in the summer of 1842 helping Lord Francis Egerton with an article for the Quarterly Review. This was ostensibly a review of a life of Marshall Blucher but the larger part was concerned with criticisms of the Duke's disposition of the Allied troops at Waterloo made in Sir Archibald Alison's History of Europe. On reading a draft of the article the Duke, who had for many years resisted pressure to write his own account, sat down immediately and wrote a short memorandum with the aim of making Alison out to be 'a damned rascally Frenchman.' In September 1842 after reading a translation of Clausewitz'a Campaign of 1815 he wrote a second, longer Memorandum. He sent it to Gurwood saying that it needed revision and Gurwood made a number of editorial suggestions. However the Duke made it very clear that it was not to be published.

A second edition of the Dispatches was planned. The aim at first to reduce the length but new papers were continuing to come in and there was every prospect that it would be enlarged rather than abridged. The Duke's approval at every stage was still required and progress was slowed following his two strokes in November 1839 and February 1840. Gurwood undertook his usual careful and precise work on the publication with a toll on his own health. The second edition ran to eight volumes, the first three on India coming out in 1844 and the next four in late 1844 and 1845. Volume VIII was published in 1847 after Gurwood's death.

There was a continuing problem with pirate publications and, in order to enable Gurwood to bring a court case, in March 1845 the Duke assigned Gurwood sole copyright.

== Later life ==
Gurwood was made a Companion of the Bath in 1838, and in March 1839 he was given a pension of £200pa for Literature and Service. In September 1839 the Queen of Portugal nominated him a Knight Commander of the Tower and the Sword. In November 1839 he was appointed Deputy lieutenant at the Tower of London on the recommendation of the Duke, who was the Constable. The Secretary at War, T.B. Macaulay, pointed out that garrison sinecures were supposed to be abolished on vacancy, but the Duke argued that in these times of civil unrest it was essential to do everything to ensure the security of the Tower.

In December 1840 Gurwood bought a house at 70 Lowndes Square and his family, who had spent much of their time in Paris, came to live in London. As in Paris, they moved in literary and social circles. Eugenie Mayer was much admired, and it was at this time that she met Balliol Brett whom she later married.

In addition to his work on the Duke's papers, Gurwood was engaged in a very public altercation with Sir William Napier. Gurwood disagreed with the accounts in Napier's History of the rivalry between the 43rd and the 52nd in the capture of the howitzer at Sabugal and, more personally, of his own role in the siege of Ciudad Rodrigo. When Volume IV of the History came out in 1834 he sent Napier privately a lengthy description of his and his party's actions during the siege. In 1838 he put the matter into the public domain with a footnote in Volume VIII of the Dispatches stating that Napier had been misinformed about the siege and that a correct statement had been forwarded to him for use in a future edition. Napier retaliated in Volume VI of the History published in 1840 saying that Gurwood's recollections were confused by the head wound he had received, and that the recollections of other officers were completely different. He printed a long extract from a memoir by a Major Mackie who claimed to have been the person to whom the Governor surrendered, and who alleged that Gurwood had taken the sword away from him.

This account was expanded in a life of Wellington by W.H. Maxwell. His friend Mackie was dead, he wrote, but he could not permit the honour 'indubitably achieved by his lamented friend to be assumed by another, no matter how deserving or distinguished,' A review of the book in The Times on 11 July 1842 wrote of the laurels being unfairly placed on the brows of Colonel Gurwood, and Gurwood was deeply hurt at being held up to the world as 'a cheat and impostor'. Gurwood then spent a great deal of time obtaining statements in support of his own account from comrades who had been present at the siege, and in May 1844 he managed to track down M. Bonfilh, the French officer who had taken his party to the Citadel. Bonfilh wrote that he remembered the events clearly and Gurwood's part in them.

Napier remained unconvinced, and Gurwood collected together all the material relating to their argument about the siege and also about the capture of the howitzer and published it in book form. He distributed it to friends in June 1845 and deposited a copy in the British Library.

His half brother, Charles Okey, said after Gurwood's death that his head wound had caused occasional fainting fits and that some eminent army surgeons had expressed the opinion that 'although he thought little of it, it might one day prove fatal to him.' Gurwood's friends attributed his ill health to over-work. Fanny Gurwood described how her husband had customarily started work at daybreak and been constantly occupied with his papers. In December 1838 Lord Hertford was 'convinced that your indisposition was caused by over mental fatigue' and urged his friend to come abroad and resume his old and pleasant life. Gurwood's final illness in the late autumn of 1845 manifested itself in chronic insomnia. On 28 November he wrote to a friend that the 'last volume and Index have upset me and I have been confined to my room with insomnia for ten days - not a wink of sleep!' On 15 December he said that the insomnia continued undiminished accompanied by fever and added that Fanny was almost as unwell as he from the constant attendance upon him.

He was invited down to Brighton to stay with his old friend Sir Henry Webster and, when the family joined him, they moved into lodgings. He went to London briefly to return papers to Apsley House and to burn his own copies of letters from the Duke. On 27 December 1845 he cut this throat while Fanny and her daughters were out for a walk. Their friends immediately rallied round the stricken family. Lady Webster took them into her home, and Sir Henry and Lord Liverpool made themselves responsible for the removal of the body and for the funeral. An inquest was held on 29 December and a verdict of temporary insanity was returned which allowed Gurwood to be buried in consecrated ground. On 30 December Sir Henry wrote to the Duke on Fanny's behalf asking if her husband could be buried in the Tower of London. The Duke gave his consent but said that the funeral must be strictly private. It took place on 3 January, Gurwood is buried in the vaults of the Tower and there is a memorial to him on the wall of the chapel.

Allegations immediately began to be made to the Duke that Gurwood had a large number of his papers and that they 'had better be got hold of...before the women are told the value of them.' Adele Gurwood assured the Duke early in January 1846 that his papers were secure, that only a person appointed by the Duke would have access to them, and that, a fortnight before his death, her father had sent to Apsley House a large box of the papers he regarded as of greater importance. The Duke appeared satisfied but he then became extremely agitated at suggestions that Gurwood had been taking notes on his conversations and that these might get into the public domain. He wrote a long letter to Fanny on 29 January about the evil consequences that might result to his and, even more, to her husband's reputation. Fanny replied that Gurwood had made notes on military questions only and she confirmed that Gurwood had burnt them all, but on 2 February the Duke wrote her another very long letter repeating his reproaches. It was a sad end to the long collaboration between the Duke and his loyal and indefatigable editor.

== Notes ==
=== Bibliography ===
- Wellington Papers, University of Southampton Archives and Special Collections
- ed/trans Christopher Bassford, Daniel Moran and Gregory W. Pedlow: On Waterloo: Clausewitz, Wellington and the Campaign of 1815. ClausewitzStudies.org 2010
- John Gurwood and William Francis Napier: Additional correspondence. Criticism of references to Col. Gurwood in the "History of the War in the Peninsula. London 1845 British Library reprint.
- Leslie Shane: The letters of Mrs Fitzherbert London 1940
- Freida Stack: John Gurwood The editor of the Duke of Wellington's Dispatches 2022
- Earl Stanhope: Notes of conversations with the Duke of Wellington 1831 - 1851 London 1888
- C.M. Woolgar: "Wellngton's Dispatches and their editor, Colonel Gurwood' Wellington Studies I. Southampton 1996
