= James Howe Carse =

British-Australian artist

- Born: c.1819 Edinburgh
- Died: 1900
- Known for: Landscape paintings

James Howe Carse (ca. 1819–1900) was a British Australian oil painter who specialised in landscapes. He was born in Edinburgh to a family of painters. He exhibited in the UK, won a gold medal in Chicago and rose to be described as the "best painter" in the colony of New South Wales.

== Life ==
Carse was born in about 1819 in Edinburgh and his father is said to have been Alexander Carse, a well-known painter of Scottish scenes. It is thought that he was named after James Howe, a contemporary Scottish painter of animals.

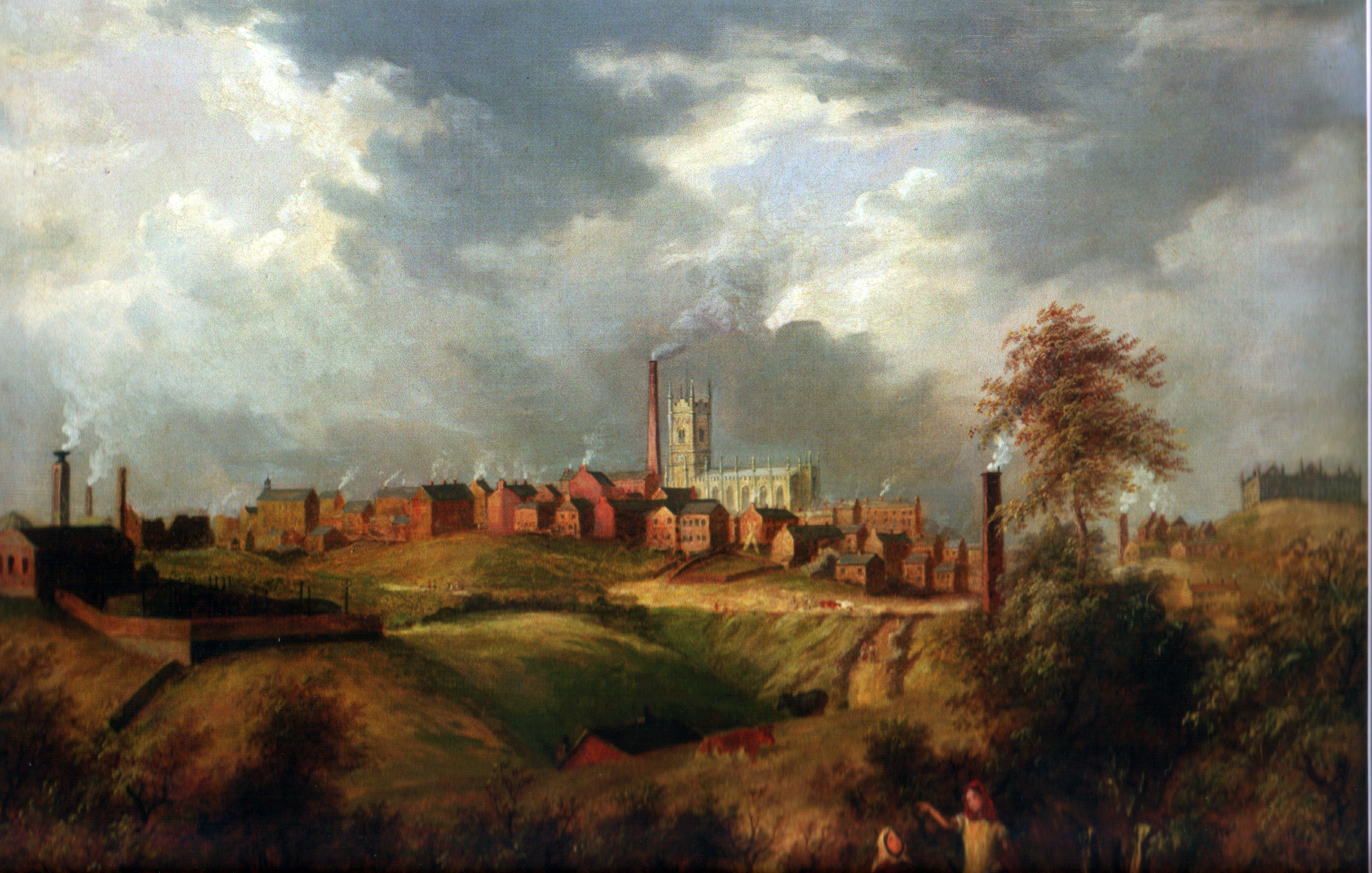
Oldham from Glodwick, at Gallery Oldham, in Oldham

Carse's elder brother William (some say William was his father) was trained at the Royal Academy in London, but James was enrolled at the new Royal Scottish Academy, where his father, having returned to Scotland from London, was a founding member. Although his father had exhibited at the academy between 1827 and 1836, he was not financially successful and his father needed to apply for financial assistance in 1843. He died the same year.

Carse was in London in the early 1860s, exhibiting paintings of Scotland and England. His paintings at that time include several of scenes around Bolton and Oldham.

In 1866, Carse won a gold medal at the Intercolonial Exhibition in Chicago.

== Adelaide, Australia (1867–1868) ==
It is believed that Carse originally entered Australia via Adelaide in South Australia in 1867 due to ill-health. A watercolour drawing of the Kapunda copper mines is dated by Carse to 1867. Up until 1868, he did not devote much time to art.

== Melbourne, Australia (1868–1870) ==
In August 1868, Carse exhibited some of his first works at the Museum of Art at 105a Collins Street East in Melbourne, Australia. The works included landscape scenes on the Campaspe and Mile Creek, Melbourne (as seen from the Botanical Gardens) and other illustrations of bush life. By September 1868 Carse had begun commission work in animal and landscape paintings from premises at 143 Lonsdale Street, Melbourne.

By March 1869, Carse had six paintings exhibited in the shop of Mr. Whitehead, Collins Street, Melbourne, including one of Coliban Falls, two of Mount Beckwith, one of Mile Creek, and the other two were unnamed. In November 1869, he had created two new works based on the landscapes in Talbot country, Victoria – one of Middle Creek near Clunes, and another of a swamp in the same area.

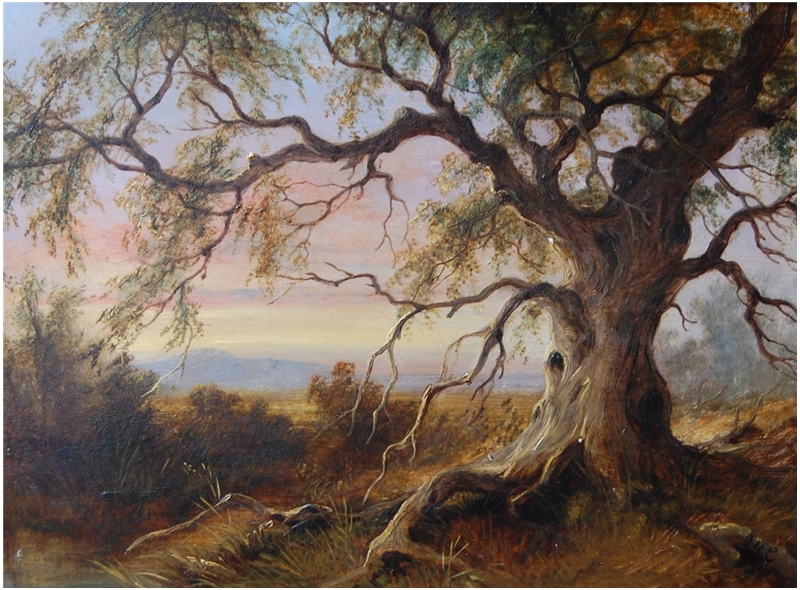
Old Gum Tree at Riddells Creek, c.1870, oil on board

In late 1869, Carse went on a "professional excursion" to the country. He returned with two oil paintings and a variety of sketches. The completed works were put on display at Hines Gallery, Collins Street by mid-January, 1870. The two paintings included Riddell's Creek Falls and Evening at Riddell's Creek.

Another painting accredited to Carse during 1869 is A River Ferry Crossing.

In December 1870, Carse contributed a number of his paintings to the Victorian Academy of Art exhibition, hosted in the carriage annexe of Melbourne's exhibition building.

== Queensland, Australia (1869–1870) ==
During 1869 to 1870, it appears that Carse travelled to Queensland where he painted Gladstone, Queensland, New Zealand Gully, near Rockhampton, Queensland, and Townsville, Queensland.

== Sydney, Australia (1871–1900) ==
By January 1871 Carse had left Melbourne and was located in George Street, Sydney.

In March 1872 he exhibited Weatherboard Waterfalls (No.79) at the first exhibition of colonial works for the first New South Wales Academy of Arts exhibition at Sydney's Chamber of Commerce. He received a certificate of merit, although many considered his work one of the best at the exhibition. In the same year he exhibited A View on the Weatherboard (No.129) in the Agricultural Society of New South Wales' Annual Show, where he was award second prize.

For the second New South Wales Academy of Arts exhibition on 15 April 1873, Carse provided four oil paintings; Mount Dromedary from Hobbs' Point (No.15), The Waterfall in the Blue Mountains (No.16), Loch Oich and Inverary Castle in Scotland (No.17), and Loch Laggan (No.18). Carse took out the Hon. John Campbell prize of £25 for Loch Oich and Inverary Castle in Scotland.

For the third New South Wales Academy of Arts exhibition in April 1874, Carse submitted a portrait of himself sitting in his studio working with brush and palette. In July, nine paintings by Carse were sent to Victorian Academy of Art exhibition in Melbourne. The paintings included Loch Oich and Inverary Castle in Scotland, The Waterfall in the Blue Mountains, Mount Dromedary from Hobbs' Point, Weatherboard Waterfalls, Aisla Craig, Mount Macedon, Willoughby Falls on the North Shore, Loch Laggan and Loch Ericht. An additional painting Loch Subnaig (No.100) was also presented.

For the fourth New South Wales Academy of Arts exhibition in March 1875, Carse submitted Bega Swamp and Views on the Wagonga River. A total of five pieces were submitted (No.s 16–19, 50 & 51). He received Highly Commended and Certificate of Merit (No.19). Works submitted for the exhibition were transferred to the Sydney Intercolonial Exhibition of 1875 (No.30,31,35,41,44,45).

Carse, now living in Waverly, sent two pictures to the Intercolonial Exhibition in Melbourne, September 1875. The two pictures were A Creek in New South Wales and Walaga Falls. He received third place (No.3089 & 3090).

In November 1875, Carse and fellow artists J.A.C. Willis, Grant Lloyd, A.B. McMinn and H Wise, visited camps set up by the Academy of Arts in the Grose Valley, Blue Mountains.

An exhibition of his new work was shown at the Melbourne Public Library. He enjoyed commercial success, as an engraving of his drawing was included on the front cover of the Illustrated Melbourne Post later that year. An engraving of his painting of Aboriginals sitting around a fire on the shore of King George Sound was commissioned by Edwin Carton Booth. This and several of his other drawings of New Zealand and Western Australia were included in Booth's Australia Illustrated, although they were attributed to "Carr".

By 1876 he had helped to found Melbourne's Victorian Academy of Art and the New South Wales Academy of Art, and he had been awarded numerous prizes and awards. In that year he was described in New South Wales as the "perhaps the best painter in the colony" and his work was selling at 30 guineas a painting. In 1880 he joined a group who left the Academy of Art to create the Art Society of New South Wales. Carse was now creating a large number of paintings but from this time they diminished both in quantity and originality as he reworked old subjects.

He and his friend George Podmore's home was at Mosman Bay. Carse died in 1900 from the effects of alcoholism.

== World's Colombian Exposition, 1893 ==
The World's Columbian Exposition was a world's fair held in Chicago in 1893 to celebrate the 400th anniversary of Christopher Columbus's arrival in the New World in 1492. For Department K (Fine Arts, Painting, Sculpture & co.), Department 141, A. E. Watson of Circular Quay, Sydney, loaned a collection 46 oil paintings by Carse, as part of the New South Wales collection of artists, to the exposition.

No.	Description
1	Cattle Watering, Bulli Pass, N.S.W.
2	Farmyard at Mulgrave, N.S.W.
3	Scene at Tilba Tilba, N.S.W.
4	Weatherboard Falls, Blue Mountains, N.S.W.
5	Mountain Scene, Katoomba, N.S.W.
6	Miner's Camp by Moonlight, Lithgow, N.S.W.
7	Scene on the Mountains, Mount Victoria, N.S.W.
8	Pallette Knife Scene, Bulli Pass, N.S.W.
9	Coast Scene, near Botany, N.S.W.
10	Wheeny Creek, Hawkesbury River, N.S.W.
11	Bulli Pass and Kiama in the Distance, N.S.W.
12	Scene at Mossman's Bay, N.S.W.
13	Scene at Emu Plains, N.S.W.
14	Scene at Richmond, N.S.W.
15	Scene on the Hawkesbury River, N.S.W.
16	Coast Scene, Bondi, N.S.W.
17	Scene, Parramatta River, N.S.W.
18	Scene at Pitt Town, on the Hawkesbury River, N.S.W.
19	Coast Scene, Broken Bay, N.S.W.
20	Hut by Moonlight at Broken Hill, N.S.W.
21	Scene at Port Jackson, N.S.W.
22	Swamp Scene near the Coast, Manly, N.S.W.
23	Scene at Randwick, N.S.W.
24	Scene at Narrabeen, N.S.W.
25	Bark Hutt, Clyde River, N.S.W.
26	Creek Scene, Blue Mountains, N.S.W.
27	Scene at Gosford, N.S.W.
28	Mountain Scene, Kurrajong, N.S.W.
29	Three Deserted Huts Scenes, Morning, Noon, and Night, N.S.W.
30	Scene at Broughton Pass, N.S.W.
31	Grose Valley, N.S.W.
32	Coast Scene, Newcastle, N.S.W.
33	Wattle Flat, N.S.W.
34	Bulli Pass, N.S.W.
35	Scene at Blacktown, N.S.W.
36	Coast Scene at Coogee Bay, N.S.W.
37	Bushrangers' Bay, N.S.W.
38	Scene at Woy Woy, Brisbane Water, N.S.W.
39	Scene in New Zealand
40	Three Pallette Knife Scenes, Lane Cove River
41	Scene on the Lynn, N.S.W.
42	Scene on the Lynn, N.S.W.
43	Loch Ard
44	Scene on the Nepean River, N.S.W.
45	Bush Fire
46	Cattle Truck

== Legacy ==
His work is held at a number of galleries, including Gallery Oldham, National Gallery of Victoria and the National Library of Australia.
