= William Carse =

Scottish painter (1800–1845)

- Born: 29 August 1800; Edinburgh, Scotland
- Died: 13 May 1845 (aged 44); Edinburgh, Scotland

William Carse (29 August 1800 – 13 May 1845) was a Scottish painter.

== Life ==
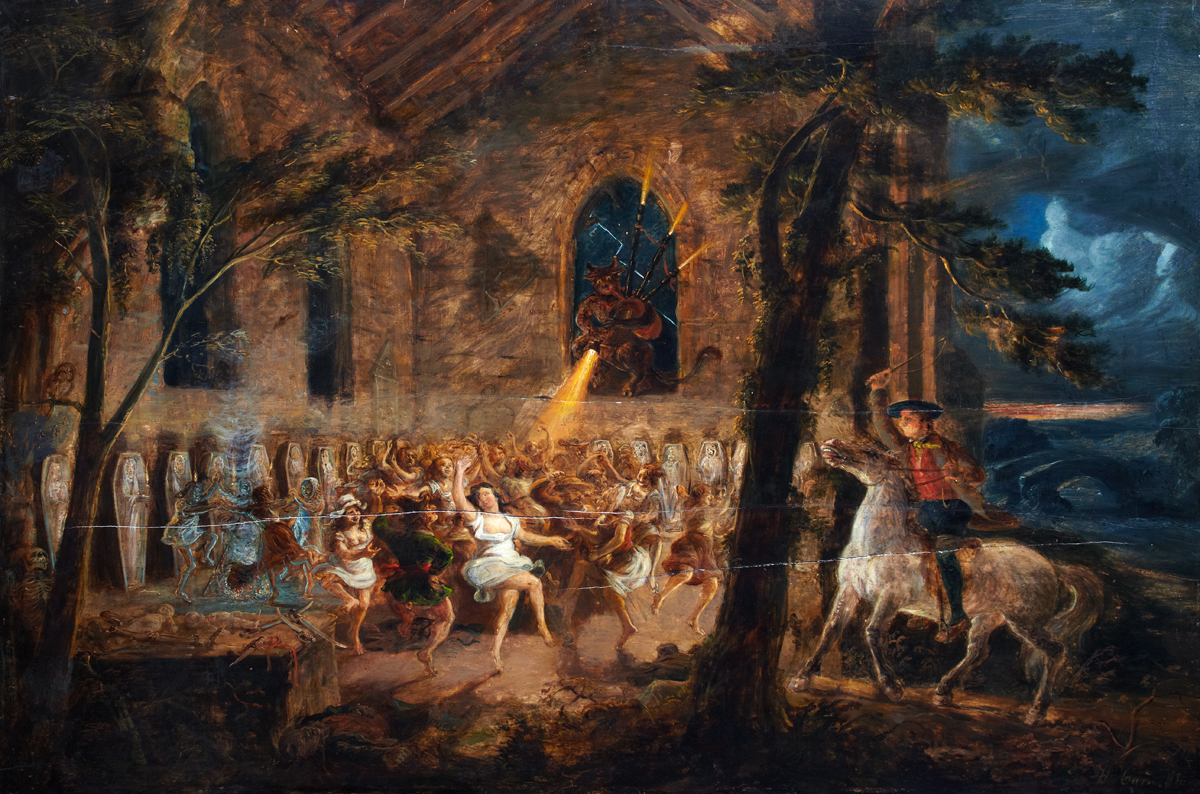
Tam O Shanter by William Carse

Carse was born in Edinburgh in 1800 to (probably) the painter Alexander Carse and his wife. His early paintings are said to be in the style of Paulus Potter.

Carse died in Edinburgh of "inflammation" in 1845. One source believes that the Australian painter James Howe Carse is probably his son but another believes they were brothers.

== Legacy ==
Carse has several paintings in public ownership including Leeds.
