= George IV Landing at Leith =

Painting by Alexander Carse

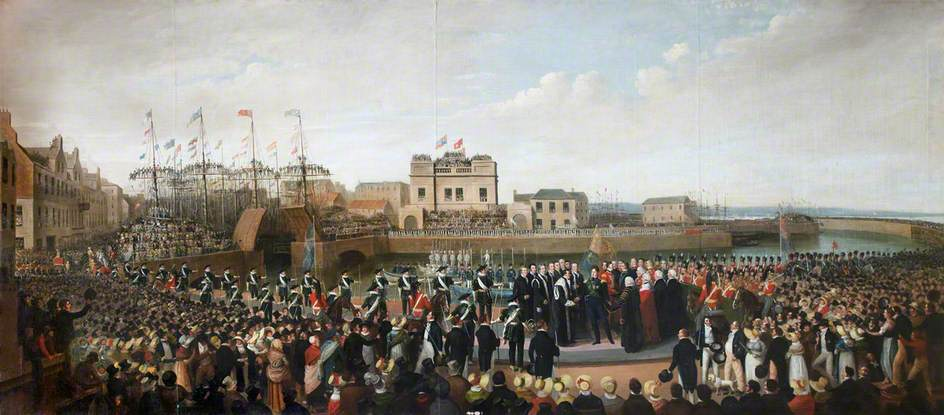
- Artist: Alexander Carse
- Year: 1822
- Type: Oil on canvas, history painting
- Dimensions: 160.1 cm × 362 cm (63.0 in × 143 in)
- Location: City Art Centre, Edinburgh

George IV Landing at Leith is an 1822 history painting by the Scottish artist Alexander Carse. It depicts the Visit of George IV to Scotland that year, specifically the landing of the king at the port of Leith in Edinburgh on 15 August 1822. George IV can be seen in the centre of the painting surrounded by dignitaries, having just disembarked from the royal yacht HMY Royal George. The painting is now in the collection of the City Art Centre in Edinburgh.

== Bibliography ==
- Coltman, Viccy. Art and Identity: A Cultural History from the Jacobite Rising of 1745 to Walter Scott. Cambridge University Press, 2019.
- Errington, Lindsay. Alexander Carse, C. 1770-1843. National Galleries of Scotland, 1987.
- Morrison, John. Painting the Nation: Identity and Nationalism in Scottish Painting, 1800-1920. Edinburgh University Press, 2003.
- Prebble, John. The King's Jaunt: George IV in Scotland. William Collins, 1988.
