= The Duke of Wellington with Colonel Gurwood at Apsley House =

Painting by Andrew Morton

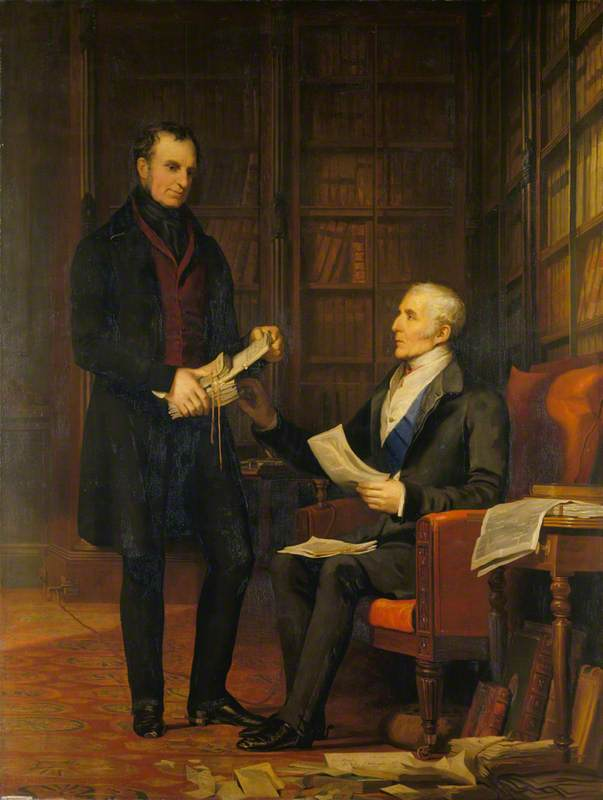
- Artist: Andrew Morton
- Year: c. 1840
- Medium: Oil on canvas
- Dimensions: 238.2 cm × 182.9 cm (93.8 in × 72.0 in)
- Location: Wallace Collection, London

The Duke of Wellington with Colonel Gurwood at Apsley House is a painting of 1840 by the British artist Andrew Morton. It depicts the Duke of Wellington in the library of his London residence Apsley House with Colonel John Gurwood. By then a former prime minister, Wellington is shown with Gurwood, who was editing his dispatches from the Napoleonic Wars which were published around this time. Gurwood is shown pulling out the dispatch covering Wellington's victory at the Battle of Waterloo in 1815.

It was displayed at the Royal Academy's 1840 Summer Exhibition at the National Gallery. Today the painting is in the collection of the Wallace Collection in Marylebone, having been acquired by the Marquess of Hertford in 1859.

== Bibliography ==
- Muir, Rory. Wellington: Waterloo and the Fortunes of Peace 1814–1852. Yale University Press, 2015.
- Poole, Andrew Geddes. Stewards of the Nation's Art: Contested Cultural Authority 1890–1939. University of Toronto Press, 2010.
- Tromans, Nicholas. David Wilkie: The People's Painter. Edinburgh University Press, 2007.
- Wellesley, Charles. Wellington Portrayed. Unicorn Press, 2014.
