= The Arrival of Louis-Philippe at Portsmouth =

Painting by J. M. W. Turner

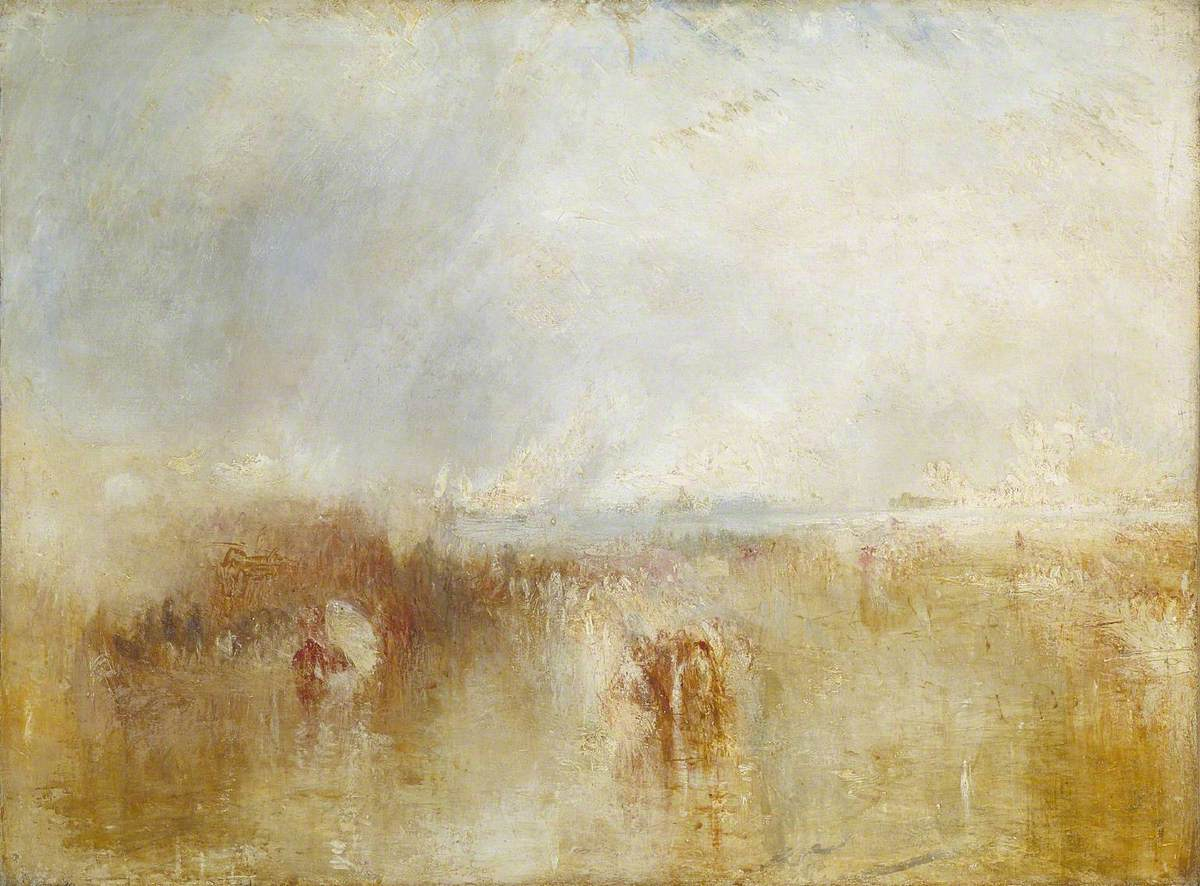
- Artist: J. M. W. Turner
- Year: c.1845
- Type: Oil on canvas, landscape painting
- Dimensions: 90.8 cm × 121.3 cm (35.7 in × 47.8 in)
- Location: Tate Britain; London

The Arrival of Louis-Philipe in Portsmouth is a c.1845 oil painting by the British artist. An unfinished work, it is intended to display the arrival of the French monarch Louis Philippe I at Gosport near Portsmouth in Hampshire on 8 October 1844 at the beginning of his state visit to Britain. The Anglophile Louis Phillipe was the first French monarch to formally visit England in several hundred years. Turner had known the king when, as Duke of Orleans, he had lived in exile in England near Turner's house at Sandycombe Lodge near Twickenham. Turner travelled down to Portsmouth to witness the scene, possibly sketching it from a nearby boat

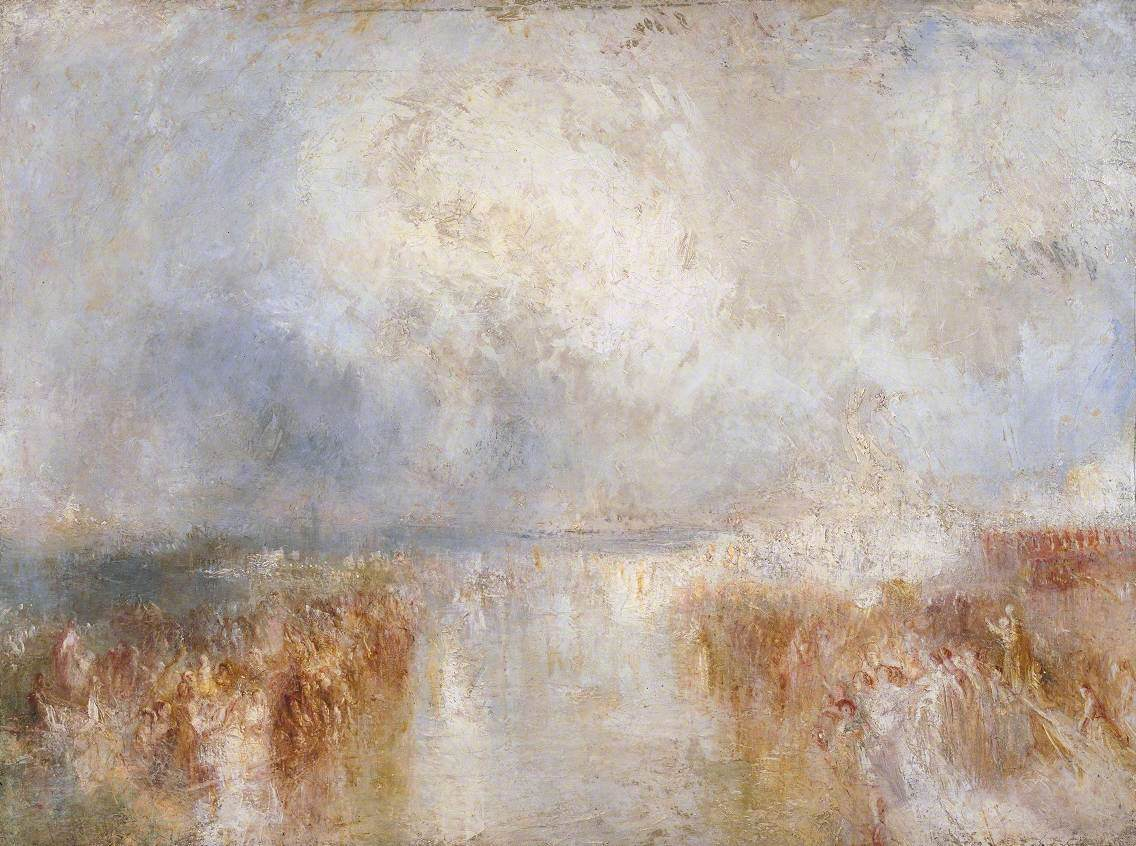
The Disembarkation of Louis-Philippe at Portsmouth

Turner's later style was increasingly abstract so it is unclear how close to completion this was, although the crowds and redcoated soldiers gathered to meet the French king are apparent on either side. In the event neither this or its companion piece The Disembarkation of Louis-Philipe at Portsmouth were ever finished and remained in Turner's studio at his death. Both unfinished works were donated to the nation as part of the Turner Bequest of 1856, and initially mistaken for paintings of Venice. They are now in the collection of the Tate Britain in Pimlico.

== See also ==
- List of paintings by J. M. W. Turner
- George IV at St Giles's, Edinburgh, an unfinished 1822 painting depicting a royal visit to Scotland

== Bibliography ==
- Bailey, Anthony. J.M.W. Turner: Standing in the Sun. Tate Enterprises, 2013
- Hamilton, James. A Strange Business:Making Art and Money in Nineteenth-Century Britain. Atlantic Books, 2014.
- Reynolds, Graham. Turner. Thames & Hudson, 2022.
