= Alina Forsman =

Finnish sculptor

- Born: 1845
- Died: 1899 (aged 53–54)
- Known for: Sculpture

Alina Forsman (1845–1899) was a Finnish sculptor. She is referred to as the first female sculptor in Finland.

== Life ==
Alina Forsman reportedly had a "burning interest" for the art of sculpture. Forsman's interest in sculpture was controversial for a woman at a time when sculpturing was regarded as a masculine subject.

She debuted as a sculptor in 1871. She studied art in Germany and Rome in 1873–75 and in Copenhagen in 1875–78.

She can be regarded as the first female Finnish sculptor rather than Eveliina Särkelä (1847–1939), active just shortly after her, who is normally referred to a such; however, Forsman mainly worked abroad rather than in her native Finland.

From 1887 onward, she lived permanently in Germany; first in Berlin, and later in Weimar.
