= Alexander Carse =

Scottish painter (c. 1770 – 1843)

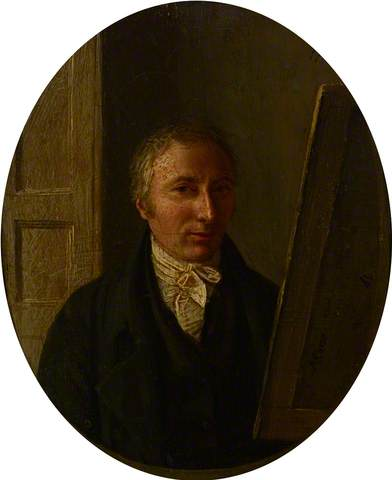
- Self-portrait, 1811, oil on steel
- Born: c. 1770; Innerwick, East Lothian, Scotland
- Died: February 1843 (aged 72–73)
- Children: William and James

Alexander Carse (c. 1770 – February 1843) was a Scottish painter known for his scenes of Scottish life. His works include a large canvas of George IV's visit to Leith and three early paintings of football matches.

== Life ==
Carse was born in Innerwick in East Lothian to William and Catherine Carse, and was baptised early in 1770. Carse started at the Trustees Drawing Academy of Edinburgh in 1801; here he studied Dutch painting, which influenced his later representations of interiors. He was taught by David Allan, who was a strong influence on his early style. By 1808 he was described as the best painter of village scenes by the Scottish antiquarian the 11th Earl of Buchan.

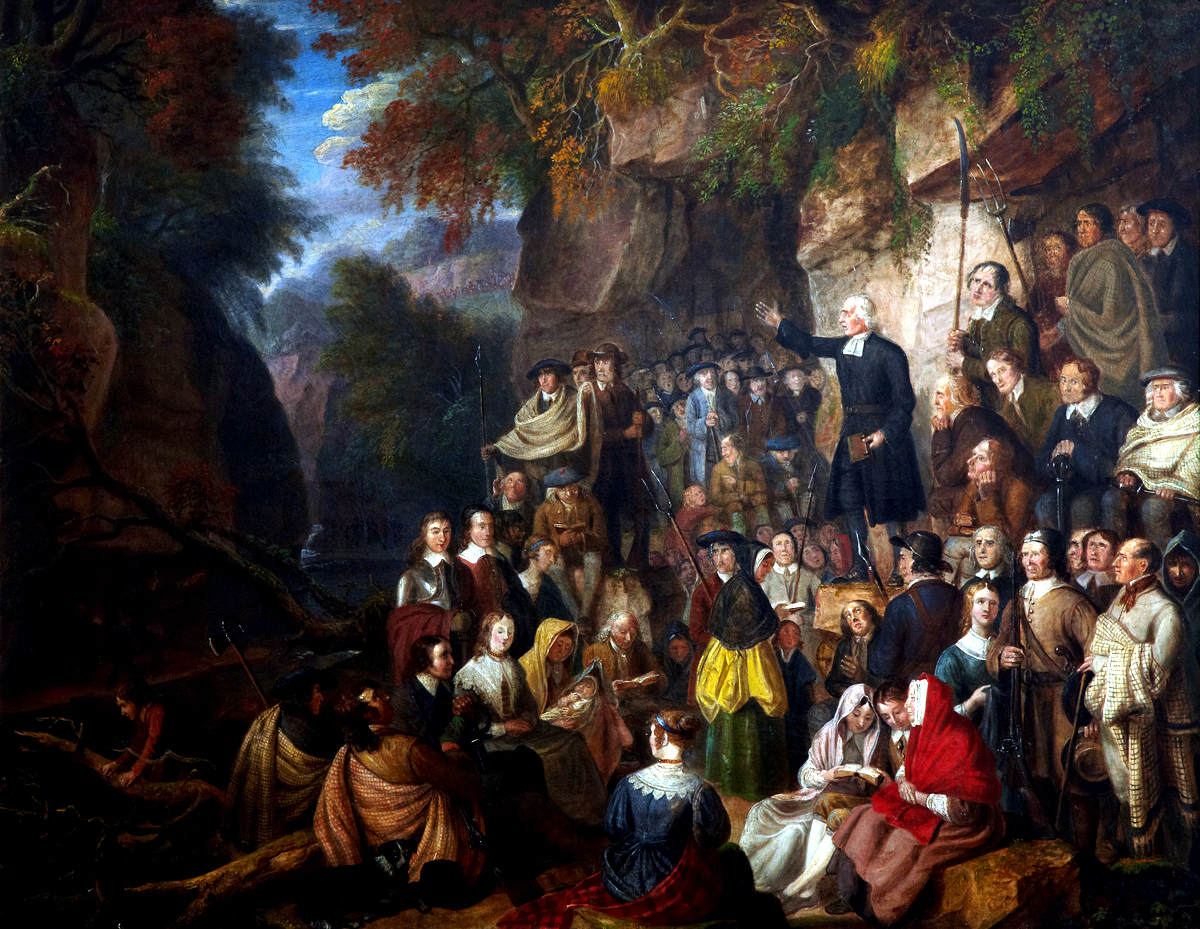
Covenanters in a Glen, c. 1800

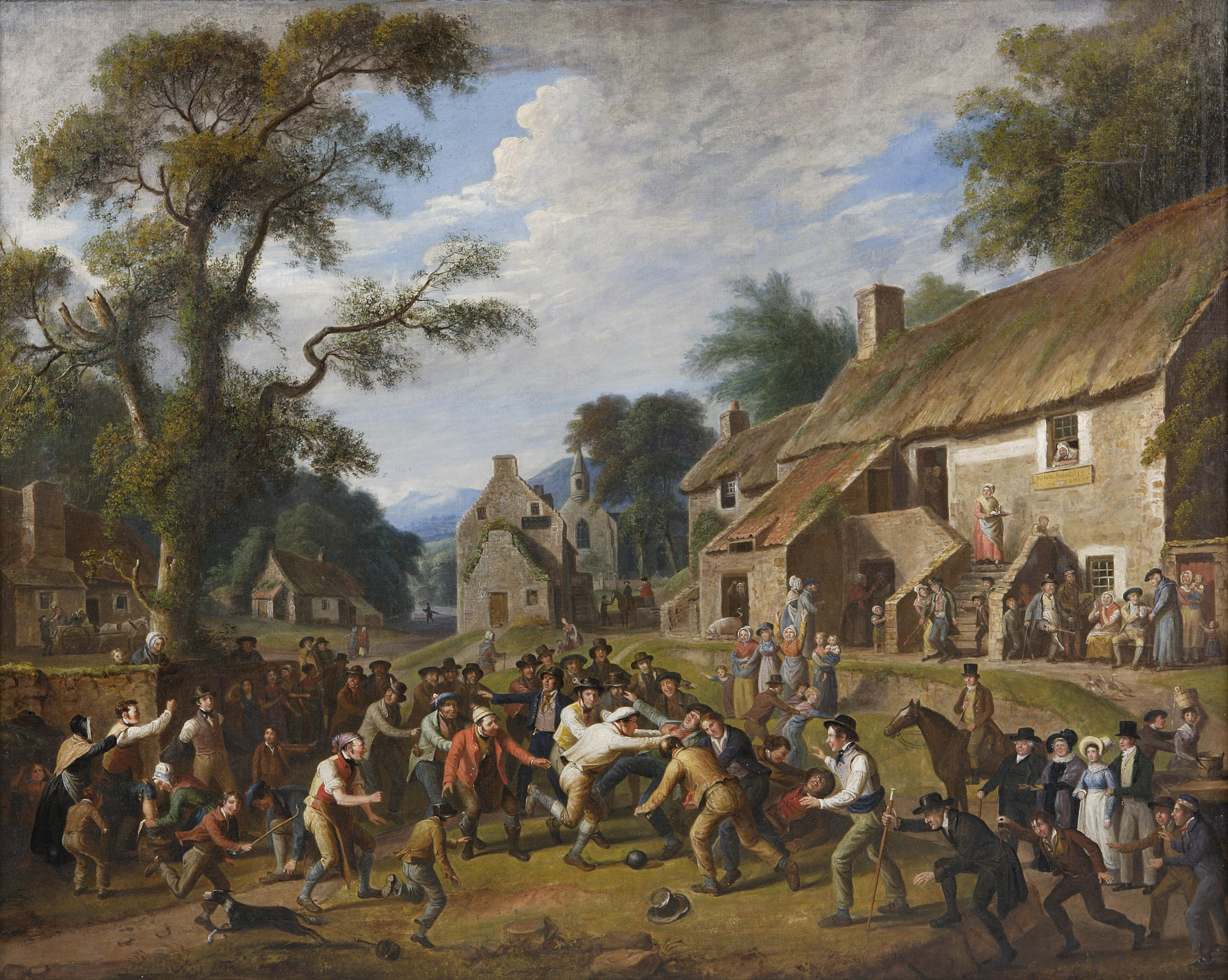
The Foot-ball Play, c. 1830

In 1795 Carse painted a group portrait of himself and what are believed to be his mother and sister. The painting shows a painter's room, with his mother reading the Bible to her two children, now adults. This work is currently in the National Galleries of Scotland collection.

By his early thirties Carse was exhibiting paintings in London at the Royal Academy and at the British Institution.

In 1812 – the year that he moved to London – Carse exhibited Country Relations, which is regarded as one of his best works. For the next eight years he worked hard to establish himself as a competitor to David Wilkie. In 1819 they both painted versions of Allen's Penny Wedding (A Penny Wedding is a Scottish custom where the guests pay for the wedding and the surplus funds the new household.) Both paintings were exhibited but it was Wilkie who sold his painting to the Prince Regent. Despite Carse's attempts to take on Wilkie's style his business proved unsustainable and Carse moved back to Scotland.

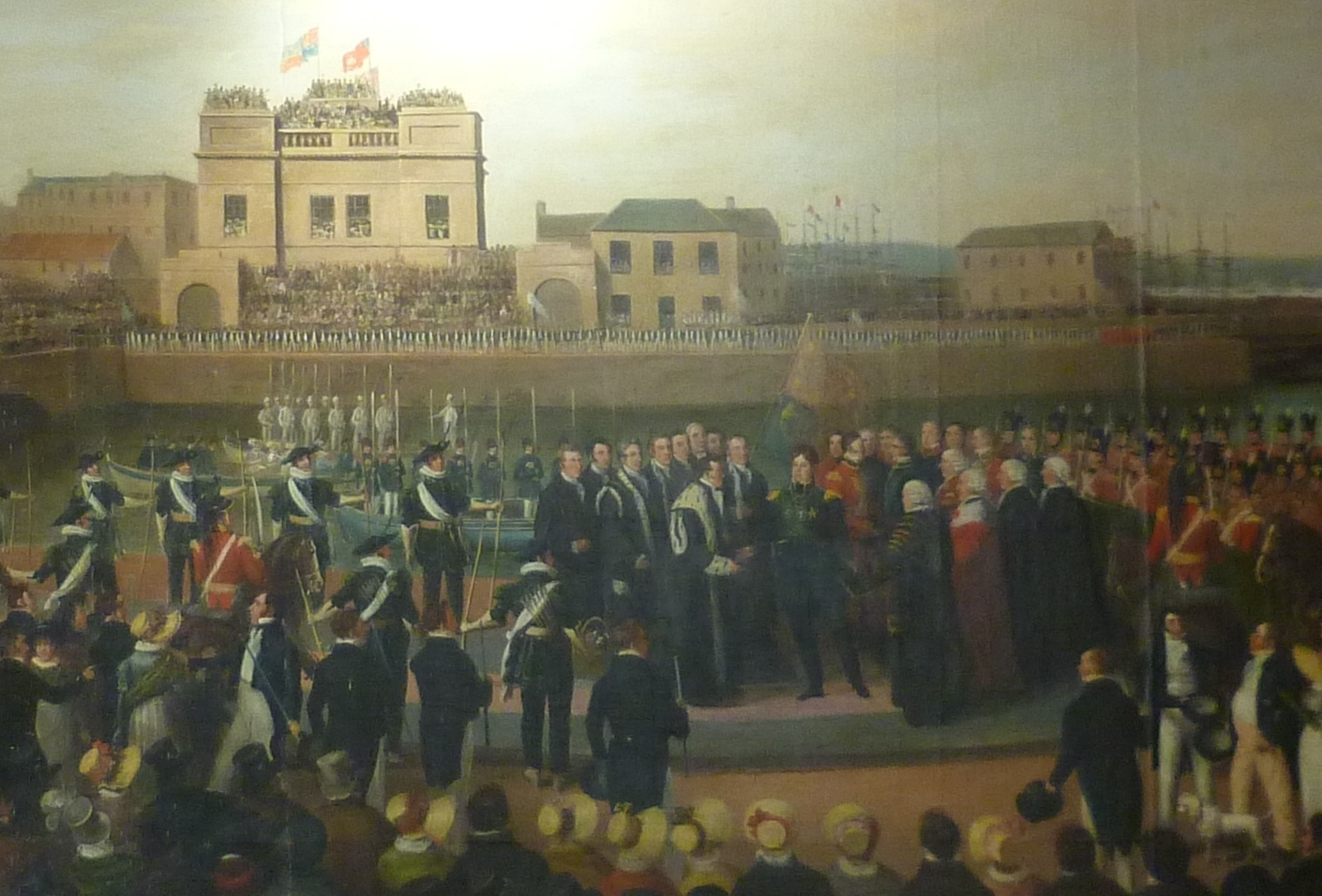
Detail from George IV Landing at Leith, hung at Leith Town Hall

One of his largest and most detailed paintings is of the Royal visit by George IV to Leith in 1822. This was a rare visit by a reigning monarch to Scotland, which was arranged and organised by Sir Walter Scott. The painting is 5 by 11 feet (1.5 m × 3.4 m), and contains hundreds of figures and a large number of portraits. From 1810 Carse also made three paintings of football matches, which are said to be amongst the earliest pictorial records of the game.

Carse is believed to have had two sons, who were both painters: William Carse and James Howe Carse. William worked in Scotland, whilst James emigrated to South Australia.

In the 1830s "Alexander Carse, portrait painter" is listed as living at 68 Abbey Hill, just north-east of Holyrood Palace in Edinburgh. Carse died in poverty in February 1843, although the precise place and date of his death are unknown.

== Legacy ==
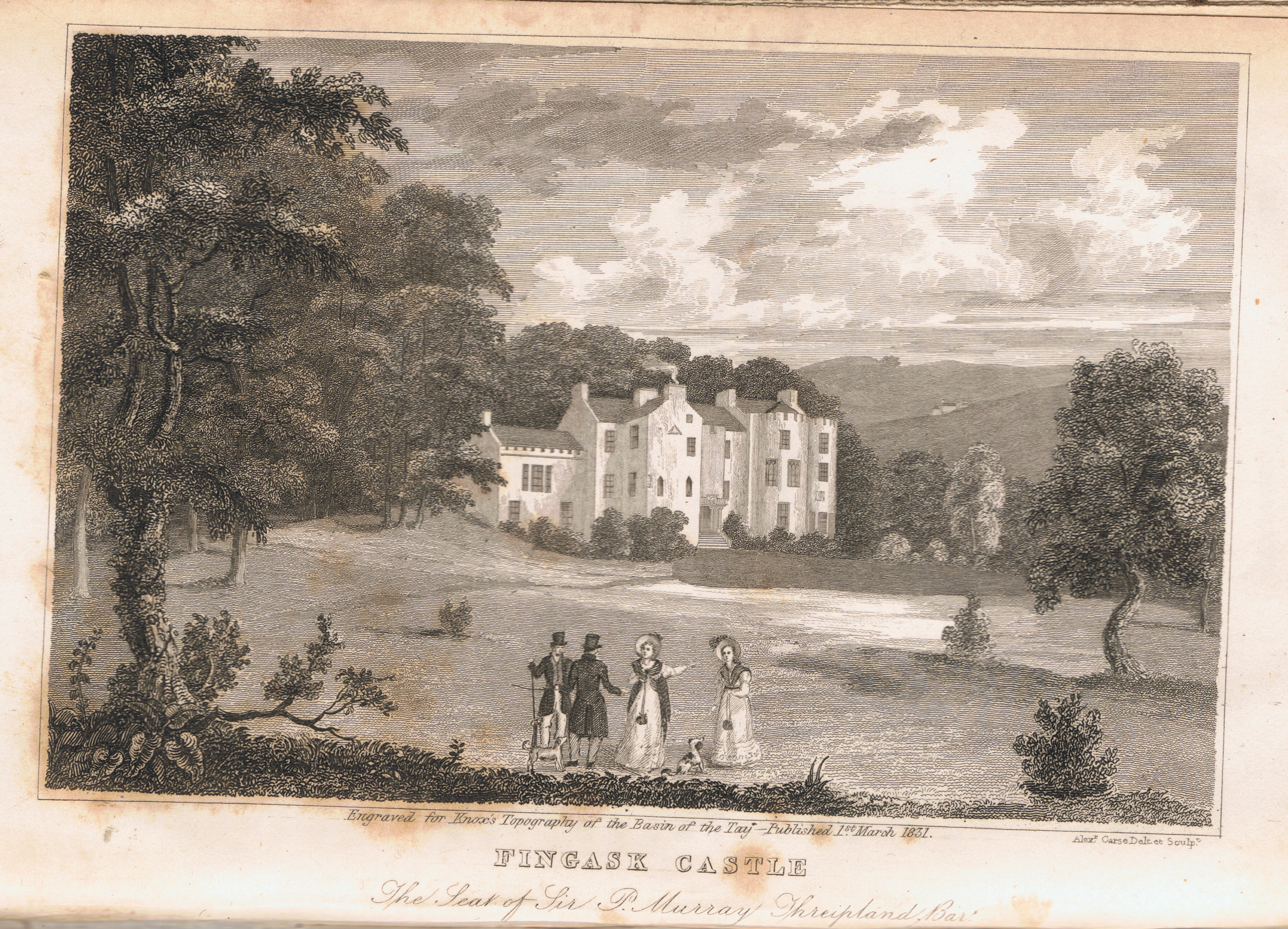
Carse's engraving of Fingask Castle, published in James Knox's The Topography of the Basin of the Tay, 1831. (3.5 inches x 5.5 inches).

There are numerous paintings by Carse in public collections in Dundee, Glasgow and Edinburgh.
