= The United Service =

Painting by Andrew Morton

- Artist: Andrew Morton
- Year: 1845
- Medium: Oil on canvas, genre painting
- Dimensions: 116.8 cm × 147.3 cm (46.0 in × 58.0 in)
- Location: National Maritime Museum, Greenwich

The United Service is an 1845 genre painting by the British artist Andrew Morton. It depicts a scene in the Painted Hall of Greenwich Naval Hospital in London. Veterans of both the British Army and Royal Navy are gathered together. The Chelsea Pensioners wear scarlet coats while their Greenwich pensioner hosts are dressed in their blue uniforms. The composition features a number of portraits of real veterans amongst the paintings of naval battles.

The work was displayed at the Royal Academy Exhibition of 1845 at the National Gallery in Trafalgar Square. Today the painting is in the collection of the National Maritime Museum in Greenwich.

== Bibliography ==
- Cannadine, David (ed.) Admiral Lord Nelson: Context and Legacy. Palsgrave Macmillan, 2008.
- Land, Isaac Edward. Domesticating the Maritime: Culture, Masculinity, and Empire in Britain, 1770-1820. University of Michigan, 1999.
