= Visit of George IV to Scotland =

19th-century monarchical tour of Scotland

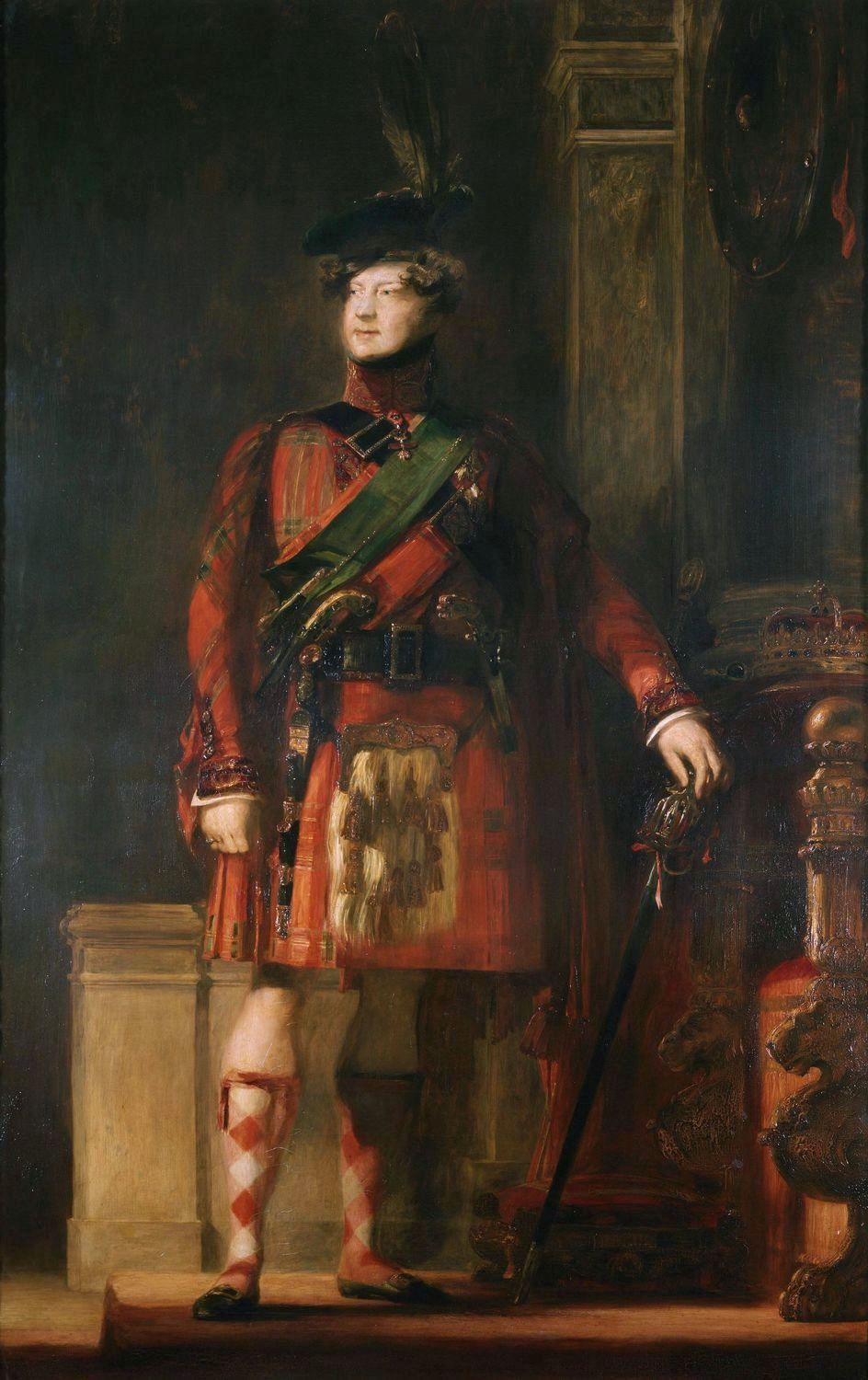
George IV in Highland Dress. David Wilkie's flattering portrait of the kilted King George IV, with lighting chosen to tone down the brightness of his kilt and his knees shown bare, without the pink tights he actually wore at the event.

George IV's visit to Scotland in 1822 was the first visit of a reigning monarch to Scotland in nearly two centuries, the last being by Charles II for his Scottish coronation in 1651. Government ministers had pressed the King to bring forward a proposed visit to Scotland, to divert him from diplomatic intrigue at the Congress of Verona.

The visit increased the king's popularity in Scotland, turning some subjects away from the rebellious radicalism of the time. However, it was Sir Walter Scott's organisation of the visit, with the inclusion of tartan pageantry, that was to have a lasting influence, by elevating the tartan kilt to become part of Scotland's national identity.

== Background ==
After nearly a decade of ruling as prince regent, George IV acceded to the throne in 1820. His coronation on 19 July 1821 was celebrated by splendid pageantry, much of it invented for the occasion. He was obese and was widely unpopular, with many offended by his treatment of his wife, Caroline of Brunswick. He had also been struggling to manipulate the government, which was seen as a corrupt oligarchy by Radicals whose increasing unrest following the revolutions which shook America and France culminated in the "Radical War" of 1820 in Scotland and terrified the gentry. He was invited to attend the Congress of Verona, but government ministers wanting to keep Parliamentary control of foreign affairs pressed him to bring forward a proposed visit to Scotland which it was hoped would calm unrest. Suffering from painful illness and pushed by opposing factions of diplomats and ministers, the King remained indecisive, but preparations went ahead in the hope of his agreement.

Walter Scott was the author of the novel Waverley which popularised a romantic image of the Scottish Highlands. In 1815 this led to his being invited to dine with George, who was then the Prince Regent. By 1822 Scott had become a baronet, and was well acquainted with both Highland and Lowland nobility.

Kilts and tartans were used for army uniforms but were no longer ordinary Highland wear, having been proscribed in the wake of the Jacobite Risings by the Dress Act. The "small" kilt as worn today was a relatively recent innovation in the Highlands, having been introduced around the 1720s and later adopted as dress uniform by the army, but the romance of the "ancient" belted plaid still appealed to those wanting to preserve the Highland identity. Soon after the Act's repeal in 1782, Highland aristocrats set up Highland Societies in Edinburgh and other centres including London and Aberdeen. These were landowners' clubs with aims including "Improvements" (the Highland Clearances) and promoting "the general use of the ancient Highland dress" by obliging members to wear this when attending meetings. Numerous less exclusive associations including the Celtic Society of Edinburgh, of which Scott was enthusiastic chairman, had membership including many lowlanders as well as chieftains of impeccable Highland ancestry, and also promoted a Highland culture with all attending meetings and dances wearing "the garb of old Gaul".

== Preparations ==
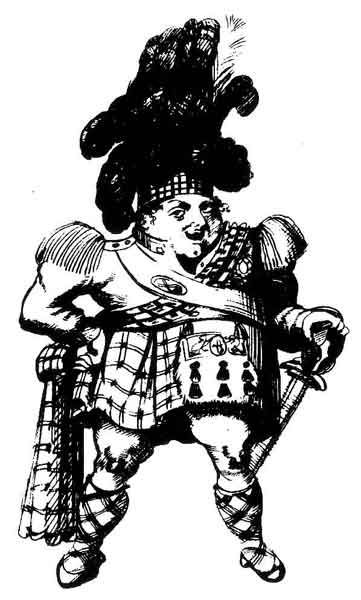
Contemporary caricature of the kilted King George IV.

In July 1822, the Lord Provost of Edinburgh received a letter announcing that the king would visit in the following month, and there was an immediate rush to make arrangements. When his advice was sought, Sir Walter Scott seized the opportunity to invent a splendid pageant wherein ancient Scotland would be reborn, and the king, who had been parodied in cartoons as a fat debaucher, would be seen as "a portly handsome man looking and moving every inch a King". George would be presented as a new Jacobite king, with the logic that he was by bloodline as much a Stuart as Bonnie Prince Charlie had been, and would win the affections of the Scots away from radical reform. A small committee was set up, with Scott's principal assistant being his friend Major General David Stewart of Garth who had made himself the undisputed authority on Highlanders with his Sketches.

George had been persuaded by Scott that he was not only a Stuart prince, but also a Jacobite Highlander, and could rightly and properly swathe himself in "the Garb of Old Gaul [sic]", so in July 1822 the King placed his order with George Hunter & Co., outfitters of Tokenhouse Yard, London and Princes Street, Edinburgh, for £1,354 18s (a sum equivalent to £150,000 today) worth of highland outfit in bright red Royal Tartan, later known as Royal Stuart, complete with gold chains and assorted weaponry including dirk, sword and pistols.

Scott brought the Highland societies and the Clan chieftains into arranging for a plaided pageantry. Garth now drilled the younger members of the Celtic Society into four companies as honour guards. Their mix of lowlanders and highlanders had already offended Alexander Ranaldson MacDonell of Glengarry, who was quick to demand that his Society of True Highlanders be given precedence, but his attempts to take over were generally disregarded. Some chieftains took the event as a chance to show impressive forces and thus disprove allegations about the Highland Clearances, but the decimation of their tenantry rather undermined this. James Loch acting for the 19th Countess of Sutherland solved the problem of finding kilts by borrowing army uniforms from the Sutherland Highlanders.

Fifty men were brought to Edinburgh by Lt. Col. Sir E. J. Murray MacGregor, Chief of Clan Gregor, provided with weapons by a supplier in Castle Street, and fitted out in tartan from one in North Bridge. The officers got costumes from Romanes & Paterson in North Bridge.

For the management of all events, Scott took the advice of his friend the young actor-manager William Henry Murray whose talents at theatrical scenery and costume were put to good use in creating the settings and the "revived ancient dresses" for the pageants he arranged. Holyrood Palace had to be readied for state occasions, but was not in fit condition as a royal residence and arrangements were made for the king to stay at Dalkeith House, 7 miles (11 km) from Edinburgh.

There was widespread concern about procedure and etiquette, not least amongst the touchy Highland chiefs (notably Glengarry), which Scott met by producing a shilling booklet entitled "HINTS addressed to the INHABITANTS OF EDINBURGH AND OTHERS in prospect of HIS MAJESTY'S VISIT. By an old citizen", which gave an outline of planned events with detailed advice on behaviour and clothing. All gentlemen of the city were expected to attend public appearances in a uniform blue coat, white waistcoat and white or nankeen (yellowish) cotton trousers, and a low-crowned dark hat decorated with a cockade in the form a white St. Andrew's saltire on a blue background. Similarly detailed guidance was given for those fortunate enough to attend functions or levees, with gentlemen to wear a full dress suit, as well as a description of the dress of the Highland chiefs and their "tail" of followers who were expected to "add greatly to the variety, gracefulness and appropriate splendour of the scene".

The exception was the "Grand Ball" held by the peers of Scotland to entertain the king: Scott's "Hints" called this a "Highland Ball". He reminded readers that the king had ordered a kilt, "this noblest of all British costumes" or "the Garb of Old Gaul", and set the condition that, for this occasion, "no Gentleman is to be allowed to appear in any thing but the ancient Highland costume, with the exception of those in uniform." At this, lowland gentlemen suddenly embarked on a desperate search for Highland ancestry (however remote) and a suitable tartan kilt from the Edinburgh tailors, who responded inventively. This can be seen as the pivotal event when what had been thought of as the primitive dress of mountain thieves became the national dress of the whole of Scotland.

According to some sources, the catering contract was won by Ebenezer Scroggie, who would become the posthumous inspiration for Charles Dickens' character Ebenezer Scrooge in A Christmas Carol. However, there is no evidence that Ebenezer Scroggie ever existed, and the story might be part of a "probable Dickens hoax".

== The visit ==
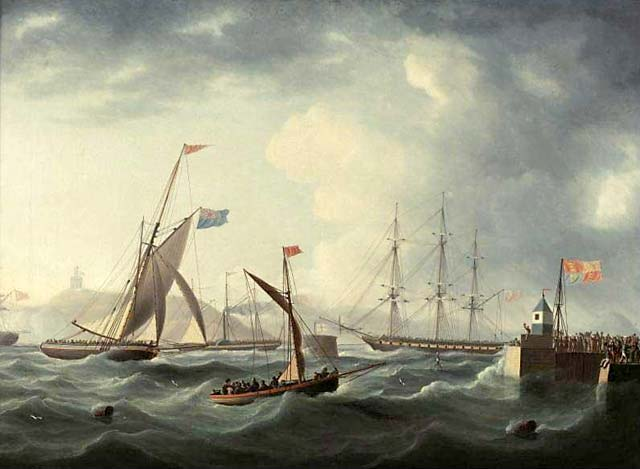
The Royal George at Leith.

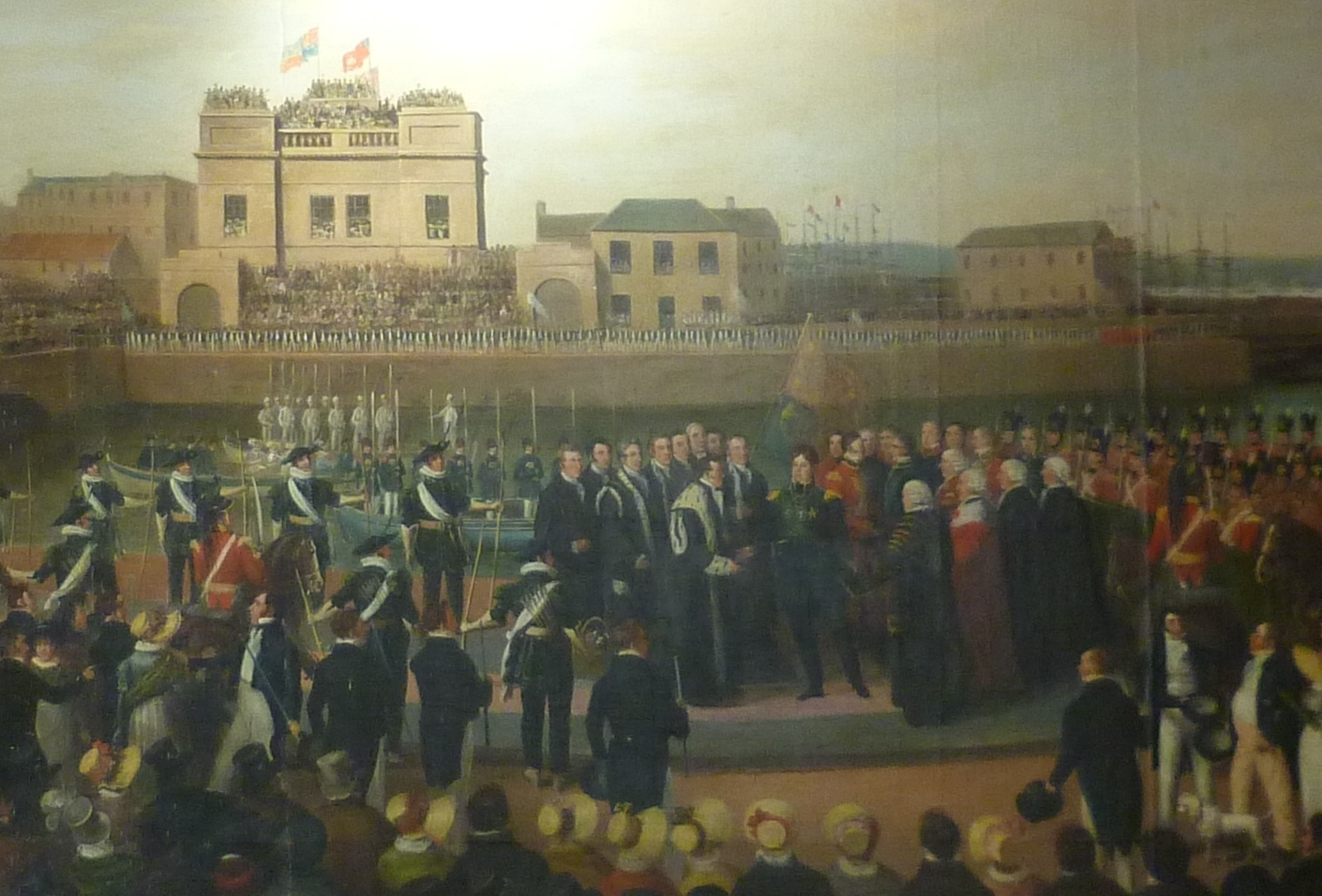
Detail from a painting by Alexander Carse showing the King landing at Leith, which remains hanging in Leith Town Hall.

The first of Scott's pageants took place on the King's 60th birthday, on Monday 12 August 1822. In procession, the Midlothian Yeomanry and companies of Highlanders escorted coaches carrying the Regalia of Scotland and dignitaries from the Castle to Holyrood Palace. The procession assembled on The Mound before going up to the Castle, and within minutes of setting off was halted by the arrival on horseback of a flamboyantly dressed Glengarry who announced that it was his rightful place to ride at the head of the procession. After a pause, a Captain Ewan MacDougall persuaded the hot-tempered Glengarry to go away. Watched by packed crowds, the procession formally received the regalia then returned down to The Mound and went down it to Princes Street and on by Calton Hill to Holyroodhouse.

The King's ship the Royal George arrived in the Firth of Forth about noon on Wednesday 14 August, but his landing was postponed due to torrential rain. Despite the rain, Sir Walter Scott was rowed out to see the King, who exclaimed, "What! Sir Walter Scott! The man in Scotland I most wish to see!" After a drink of whisky, Scott presented the King with a jewel designed and embroidered by the ladies of Edinburgh, in the form of a silver St Andrews cross embroidered with pearls on blue velvet with a belt of gold a diamond buckle and magnificent Scottish pearl surmounted by the imperial crown picked out in brilliants, rubies, emeralds and topaz. Inscribed on the cross was "Righ Albainn gu brath" (Long live the King of Scotland).

On Thursday 15 August, the King in naval uniform arrived in sunshine at the quayside of The Shore, Leith and stepped ashore onto a red carpet strewn with flowers to greet the waiting crowds, and the High Constabulary of the Port of Leith (Leith High Constables). After fifteen minutes of the ritual salutations traditional in a royal entry he got in his carriage. A quiet pause was rudely interrupted by Glengarry on horseback galloping up beside the King, sweeping off his bonnet and loudly announcing "Your Majesty is welcome to Scotland!". The King, in good humour, bowed graciously at this unplanned intrusion as his carriage moved off. A procession including lowland regiments and Highland clan regiments with pipe bands escorted the King's open carriage the 3 miles (5 km) up to Edinburgh past cheering Scots crowding every possible viewpoint eager to show a welcome to their monarch. At a theatrical "medieval" gateway the King was presented with the keys to the city and "the hearts and persons" of its people.

Much of the pageantry for the visit would be medieval rather than Highland, but the exotic outfits of the "gathering of the Gael" were to attract most attention. The next day was one that the King spent away from the public at Dalkeith. Edinburgh was full of visitors for the occasion, and that evening they walked round enjoying "illuminations" with illustrated tributes hung on public buildings, businesses and houses, "Everywhere crowded to excess, but in civility and quiet", before being escorted to their rest around midnight by bands of boys carrying flaming torches to light their way.

On Saturday afternoon, 17 August, the King attended a short levee at Holyrood Palace, where the great and good queued to be greeted by George in his Highland outfit complete with pink pantaloons to conceal his bloated legs, described as "buff coloured trowsers like flesh to imitate his Royal knees". When someone complained that the kilt had been too short for modesty, Lady Hamilton-Dalrymple wittily responded "Since he is to be among us for so short a time, the more we see of him the better."

The King would not be seen again by the public until Monday afternoon when a medium-sized crowd caught a brief glimpse of him as he went into Holyroodhouse to hear long repetitive addresses from the Church of Scotland, the Scottish Episcopal Church, universities, burghs, counties and the Highland Society, and give his short formal responses.

The King's Drawing Room on Tuesday 20 August was attended by 457 ladies, and custom required that he kiss each one on the cheek. This brief occasion took him away from Dalkeith House for two hours, and the presentation of the ladies lasted from 2.15 to 3.30. In the rush some ladies received no "buss" on the cheek, or in their nervousness scarcely felt the kiss at all. All were dressed in rich gowns with sweeping trains, and most had coloured ostrich plumes above their elaborately curled hair. The King was courteous and smiling, and paid particular attention to "the lady on whose account so many Highlanders went down to Elgin two years ago" when election passions led to Lady Anne Margaret Grant, daughter of the late Sir James Grant, 8th Baronet, and her sisters who had also supported the Tories, being besieged by a "democratic mob" of Whig supporting townsfolk until a rescue party of her clansmen was "summoned by the fiery cross" and released them without coming to blows. The story of "The Raid to Elgin" had amused the king, and he remarked "Truly she is an object fit to raise the chivalry of a clan", echoing Scott's romanticism. He spent the next day at Dalkeith, and that evening Scott dined with him.

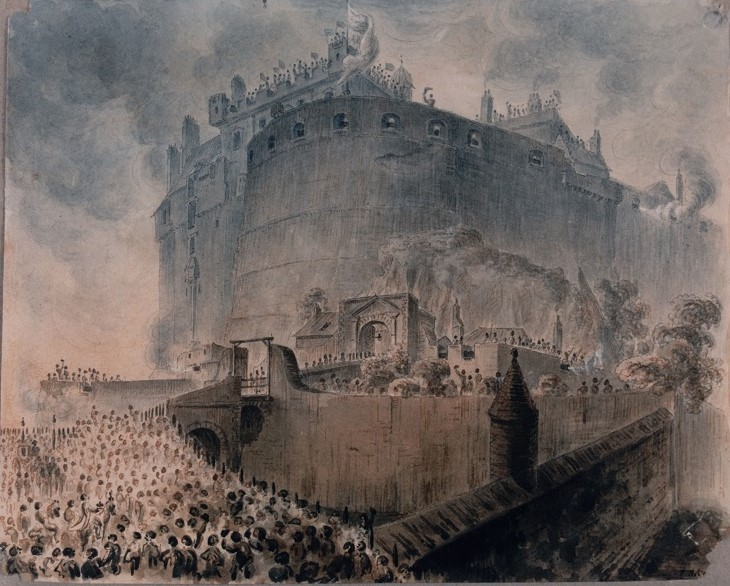
The King waves his hat from the castle battlements.

Heavy rain returned on Thursday 22 August as a Grand Procession went from Holyrood to Edinburgh Castle. The procession and the King's closed carriage went up the Royal Mile flanked by colourful bunting and densely packed cheering crowds obscured by their umbrellas. At the castle, the king climbed out onto the battlements of the Half Moon Battery to wave his cocked hat to continuing "huzzas" from the crowd for fifteen minutes, reportedly saying "Good God! What a fine sight. I had no conception there was such a fine scene in the world; and to find it in my own dominions; and the people are as beautiful and as extraordinary as the scene." and "Rain? I feel no rain. Never mind, I must cheer the people." He had not been used to this kind of reception.

On Friday, 23 August, a review of 3,000 volunteer cavalrymen was held on Portobello sands. The king was also to honour the Clans including a contingent from the Celtic Society of Edinburgh. Though disappointingly his review ended before reaching them, the Highlanders took part in the Grand March Past then were cheered by the crowds as they marched back to Edinburgh. That evening, George appeared at the Peers' Grand Ball wearing a field marshal's uniform as earlier in the day rather than the anticipated kilt. The Peers’ Ball was a formal occasion with court dress worn predominantly, though some gentlemen chose either Highland attire or military uniform. The ladies were mostly in white dresses. The Ball started with the anthem as soon as the King entered the Ballroom, followed by a reel and then a country dance. Lady Anne Scott together with her sister Isabel, daughters of the 4th Duke of Buccleuch, "danced the reels famously’’. Another reel was performed at the bottom of the ballroom by a set consisted of two older gentlemen, one of whom was a Highlander, and both "jumped and capered so and made all sorts of such strange antics" which "his Majesty seems to witness with much pleasure." The music was played by the Assembly Rooms band led by Nathaniel Gow. The performance of the reels gave the King the most delight. More dancing took place in the Second Ballroom where fashionable at the time European dances were performed such as Quadrilles and Waltzes. Contemporaries complained that the Assembly Rooms were too hot and crowded for dancing and described the Ball as being "not in fact a dancing Ball". The Assembly Rooms had been theatrically transformed by William Henry Murray, and the occasion was hailed as a triumph for him.

Saturday morning was marked by a small ceremony and procession including a Clan MacGregor Regalia Guard, as the Honours of Scotland were returned from Holyroodhouse up the Royal Mile to the Castle. That evening the King attended a tumultuous civic banquet in the great Hall of Parliament House which Murray had splendidly decorated.

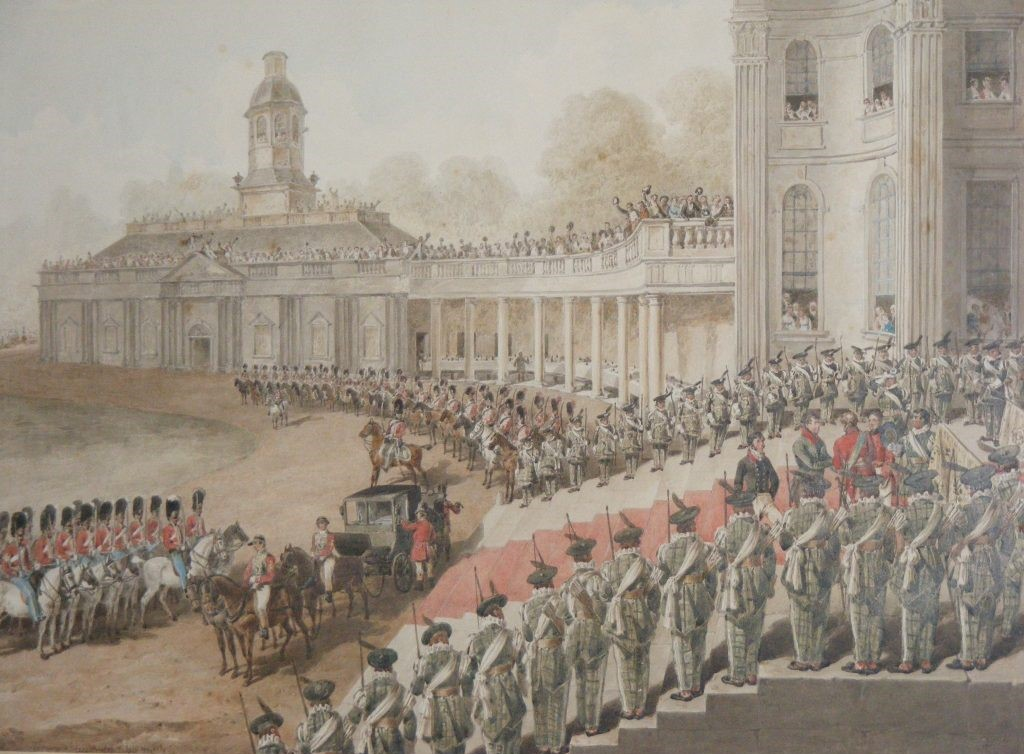
The King arrives at Hopetoun House.

Next day the King went in state to the Presbyterian Church of Scotland Sunday service at St. Giles' Cathedral. On the Monday he made a private visit to the Holyrood Palace apartments of his ancestor Mary, Queen of Scots, then in the evening attended the Caledonian Hunt Ball in a Guards uniform. For the Caledonian Hunt Society Ball, the male members of the Society wore specially prepared uniforms. "The dresses of the ladies were more varied and fanciful than at the Peers’ Ball. Blue was much worn; and, as on the previous occasion, there was a great profusion of feathers." The King arrived about 9:30 pm, entering the Ballroom with something like a candle-lit procession. The King was excited by the reels and strathspeys. Once more his wish was met, that while he was in Scotland all music would be "purely national and characteristic". The dancing again commenced with a reel; which took place in the circle that surrounded the space in front of the throne. In this space two reels at a time were danced without any stop, all the while the King stayed, which was two hours. Mudie wrote that "the first reel danced was to the air of Brechin Castle. His Majesty was particularly pleased with the second set and clapped his hands in token of his approbation. A number of quadrilles were danced in the second ballroom. About half an hour after his Majesty retired, country dances commenced, which were kept up with great spirit, by the more vigorous of the company, until nearly seven o’clock in the morning."

On the Tuesday, 27 August, George made his last and least formal public appearance, showing his evident pleasure at a theatre performance of Scott's Rob Roy adapted and produced by William Henry Murray.

George's visit closed on Thursday 29 August with a brief visit to Hopetoun House 12 miles (19 km) west of Edinburgh. Elaborate arrangements had been made and crowds waited for him in the rain. On departing Hopetoun House, The King conferred the honour of knighthood on Captain Adam Ferguson, Deputy keeper of the Scottish regalia, and Henry Raeburn, the selected representative of Scotlands fine arts. He then joined his ship at nearby South Queensferry and departed.

== Outcome ==
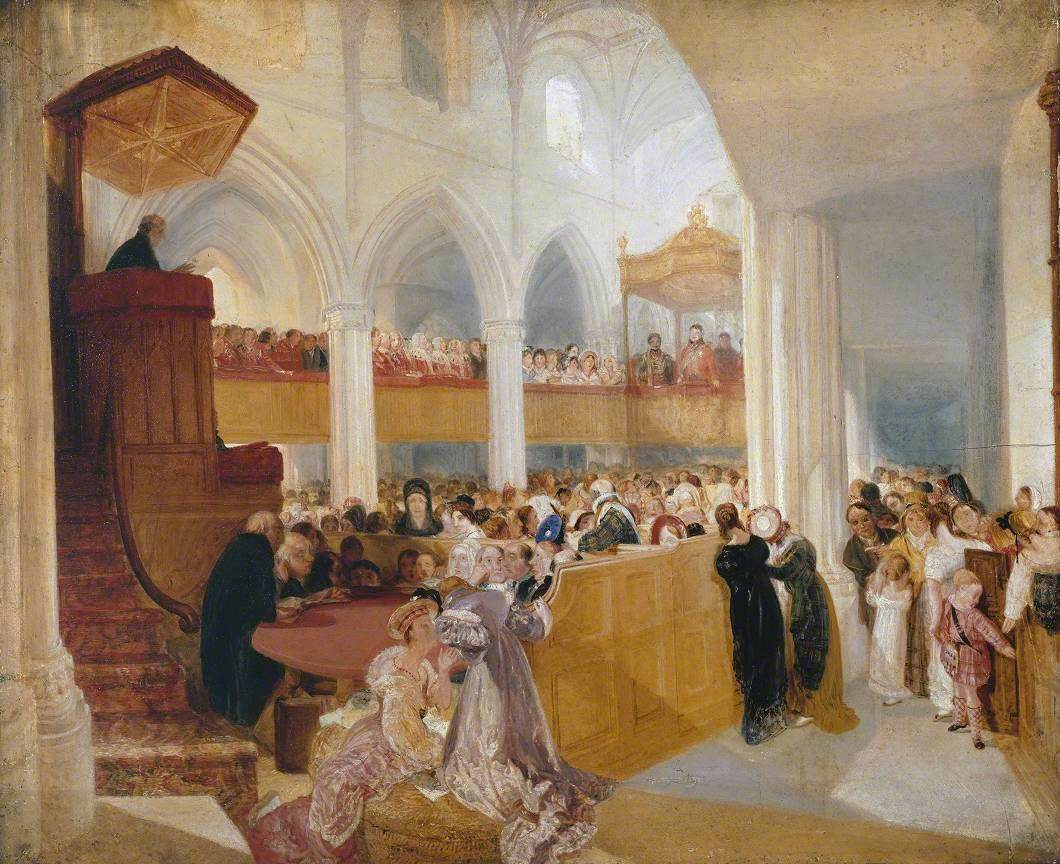
George IV at St Giles's, Edinburgh by J. M. W. Turner

While the only kilted appearance the King had made was ruthlessly caricatured, creating a memorable image of "our fat friend" being hoisted onto a horse, the effect of the event were described as "one and twenty daft days" was an increase in goodwill and a new-found Scottish national identity uniting Highlander and Lowlander in sharing the iconic symbolism of kilts and tartans. The pride of the clan chieftains in their heritage was reinvigorated, but there was no check in the progress of the Highland Clearances.

Additionally, the next Duke of Rothesay, Prince Albert Edward, was the first heir apparent to make use of that title since the Union of the Crowns. The use of that title in Scotland has continued ever since.

Following their service providing personal bodyguards during the visit, the King appointed the Royal Company of Archers as the Sovereign's Bodyguard in Scotland.

== Other sources ==
- Cooper, Henry (producer) (1960). George IV's Edinburgh (documentary film). Campbell Harper Films – via National Library of Scotland.
