= George IV at St Giles's, Edinburgh =

Painting by J. M. W. Turner

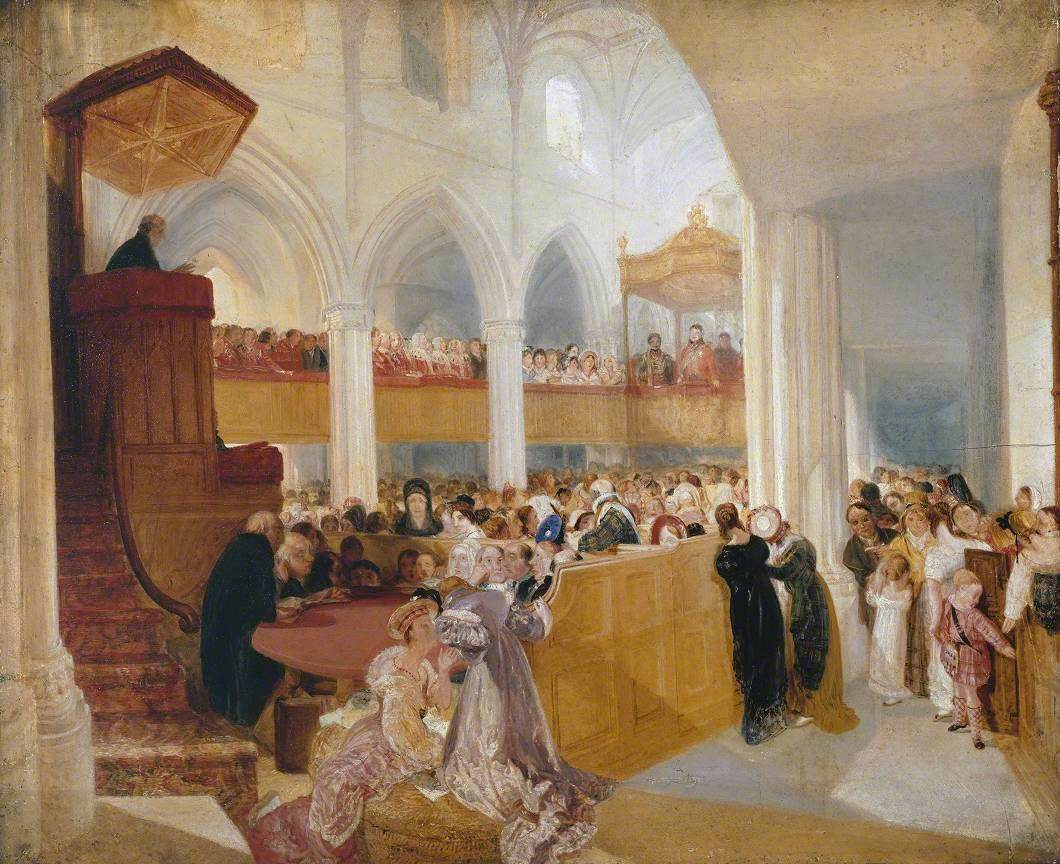
- Artist: J. M. W. Turner
- Year: 1822
- Type: Oil on mahogeny, history painting
- Dimensions: 91.8 cm × 74.6 cm (36.1 in × 29.4 in)
- Location: Tate Britain, London
- Website: tate.org.uk/...n02857

George IV at St Giles's, Edinburgh is an 1822 history painting by the British artist J.M.W. Turner. It depicts a scene at St Giles' Cathedral in Edinburgh during the Visit of George IV to Scotland in August 1822.

Turner had travelled to Scotland to sketch the visit and planned to produce a series of paintings of notable moments of the trip. Turner had an eye on the lucrative engraving market, but likely also wished to secure patronage from George IV. But for unknown reasons he abandoned the series, with this the painting closest to being fully completed. He soon afterwards received a commission from the king, thanks to the intercession of Thomas Lawrence, to produce the large The Battle of Trafalgar for St James's Palace in London. Today the painting is in the collection of the Tate Britain in Pimlico, having been part of the Turner Bequest to the nation in 1856.

== See also ==
- List of paintings by J. M. W. Turner

== Bibliography ==
- Bailey, Anthony. J.M.W. Turner: Standing in the Sun. Tate Enterprises, 2013.
- Larrissy, Edward. Romanticism and Postmodernism. Cambridge University Press, 1999.
- Hamilton, James. Turner - A Life. Sceptre, 1998.
- Mitchell, Sebastian. Visions of Britain, 1730-1830: Anglo-Scottish Writing and Representation. Springer, 2013.
