= Sunrise with Sea Monsters =

Painting by J. M. W. Turner

- Artist: J. M. W. Turner
- Year: ca. 1845
- Medium: Oil on canvas
- Dimensions: 91.4 cm × 121.9 cm (36 in × 48 in)
- Location: Tate Britain, London
- Accession: N01990
- Website: tate.org.uk/...n01990

Sunrise with Sea Monsters is an unfinished oil painting by English artist J. M. W. Turner.

It is in the permanent collection of Tate Britain.

== Description ==
Turner created this painting in the coastal town of Margate, in about 1845, near the end of his career. The painting, which measures 91.4 by 121.9 centimetres (36.0 in × 48.0 in), depicts a hazy yellow sunrise over a turbulent grey sea. Lurking in the lower left corner are pink and red swirls usually identified as the eponymous sea monsters. The painting first went on display in 1906.

== Interpretations ==
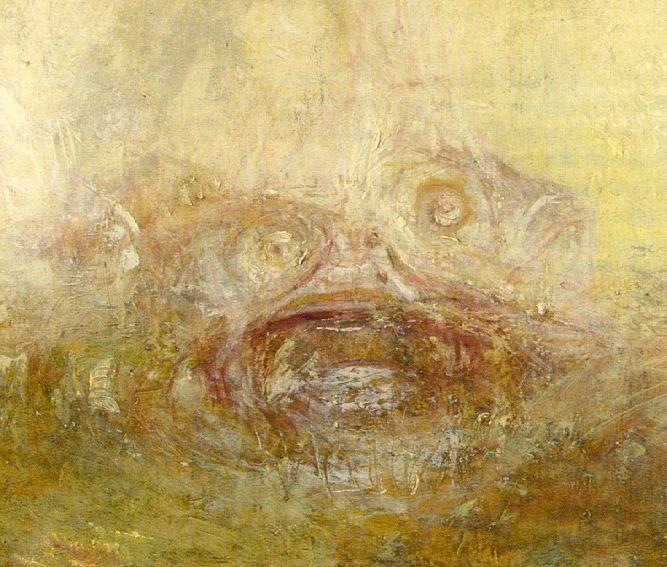
Detail of the "monsters"

Beyond these basic elements, though, interpretations of the painting are the source of much study and open to speculation. Initially, when the title of the painting was created, it only specified a single monster. The Tate Gallery maintains that the "monsters" are just fish. The Tate and other sources posit that a small section of four or five black cross-hatches might be a part of a fishing net. Critic James Hamilton speculates that the mist may hide a steam driven paddleboat being consumed by giant fish or whales, which were the subject of many of Turner's later works. This steamboat theory is consistent with the interpretation of many of Turner's other later works, as a response to the technological changes brought about by the Industrial Revolution. Other sources claim that the monsters really are just that: Michael Bockemuhl suggests that the swirls combine to form a single behemoth with large eyes and open mouth that is swimming towards the observer. They may also be compared to the monstrous creatures in the water of Turner's famous Slavers Throwing overboard the Dead and Dying—Typhoon coming on.

An alternative interpretation is that there is nothing there at all; at least nothing corporeal. Gunnar Schmidt claims the painting has two zones—the warm sunny sky, and the cold dark water—and that at their interface is a mass of drifting steam that has particles and vortices but no shape or limit. In his view, it is this thermal process that is being compared to the "monstrous" power of industrial engines and machinery. Elizabeth Ermarth goes further, comparing this painting with Turner's Mountain Landscape and Seascape with Storm Coming On, and claiming they are "almost entirely abstract representations of space as pure atmosphere, as pure medium of light."

Other shapes may also be interpreted from the painting. The Tate Museum suggests that a larger patch of red and white nearby may be interpreted as a marine float, while a 1907 catalogue from the museum suggests that icebergs can be seen in the distance. Bockemuhl sees a dog's head in a shape in the water on the left of the monster. This varied and fantastic imagery is noted in many of the analyses of Turner's later works. A paper in the Journal of the Royal Society of Medicine draws a connection between these figures and Turner's possession of acetate of morphia (a drug related to morphine), possibly used for the treatment of a toothache.

== See also ==
- List of paintings by J. M. W. Turner
