= Andrew Morton (painter) =

English portrait painter

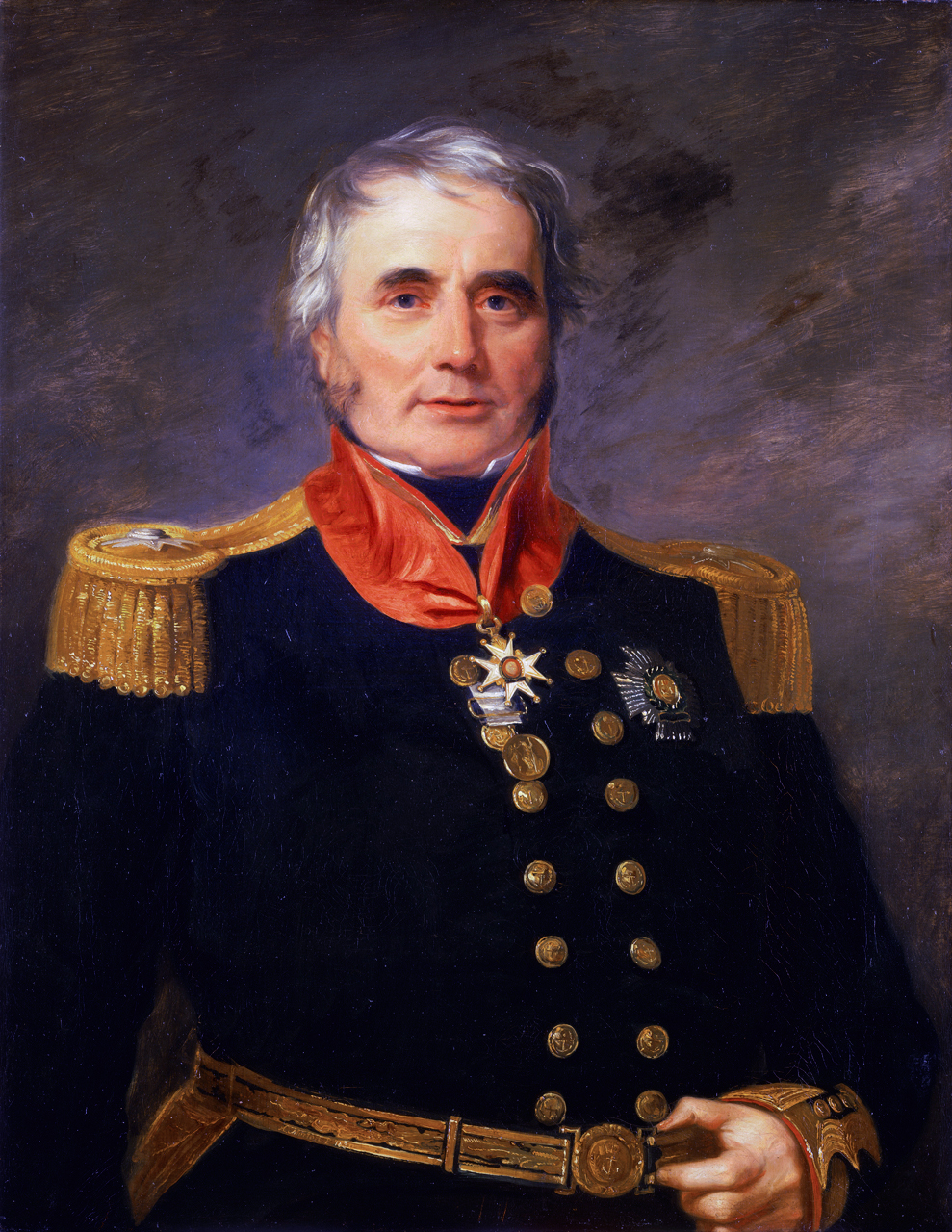
1839 portrait of James Gordon by Morton

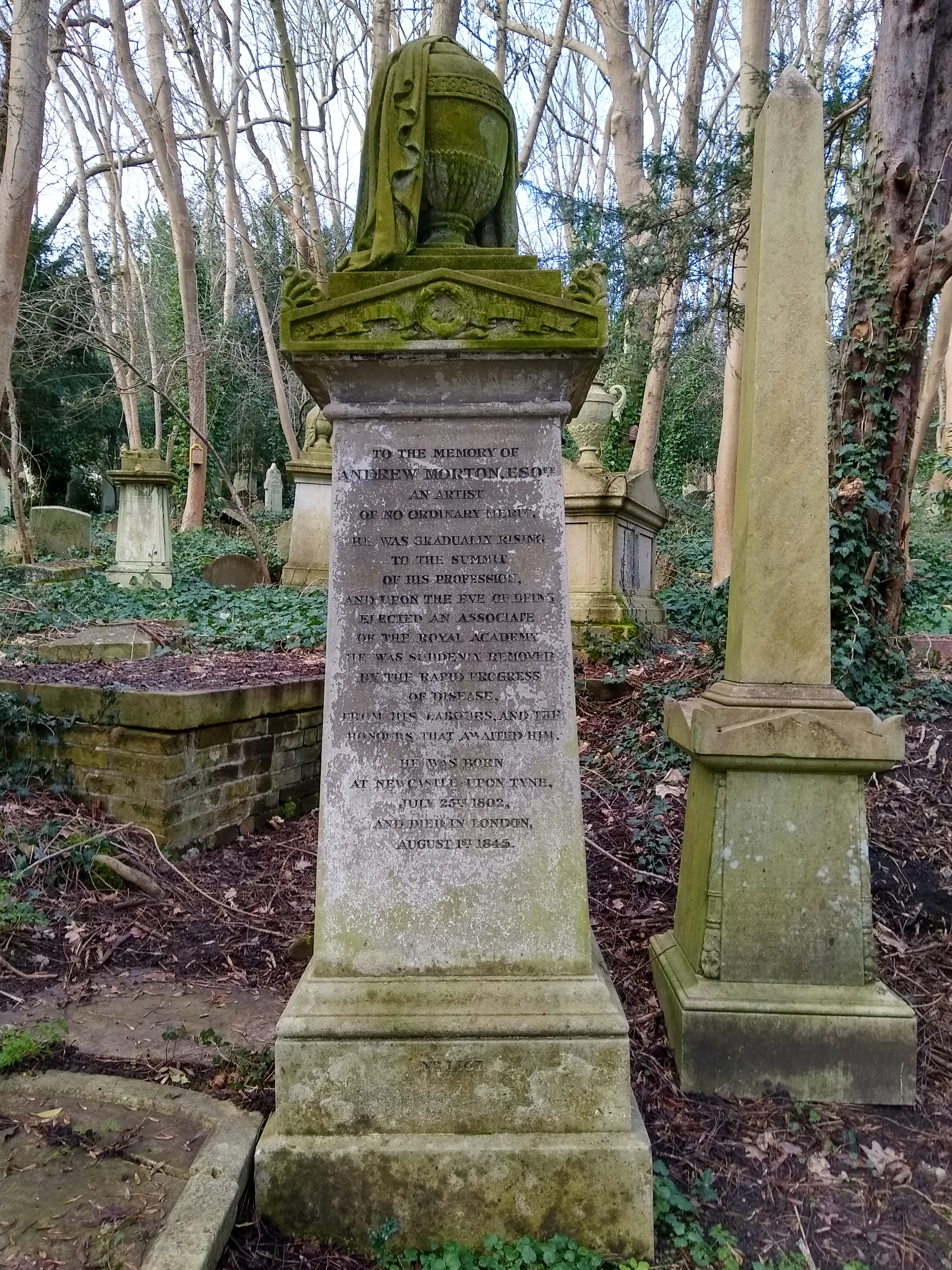
Grave of Andrew Morton at Highgate Cemetery (west)

Andrew Morton (1802–1845) was an English portrait-painter.

== Life ==
Born at Newcastle upon Tyne on 25 July 1802, he was son of Joseph Morton, a master mariner there, and was an elder brother of Thomas Morton the surgeon. He came to London and studied at the Royal Academy, gaining a silver medal in 1821. He exhibited for the first time at the Royal Academy in 1821.

Morton had a large practice and numerous distinguished sitters for portraits. He died on 1 August 1845 and is buried at Highgate Cemetery.

== Works ==
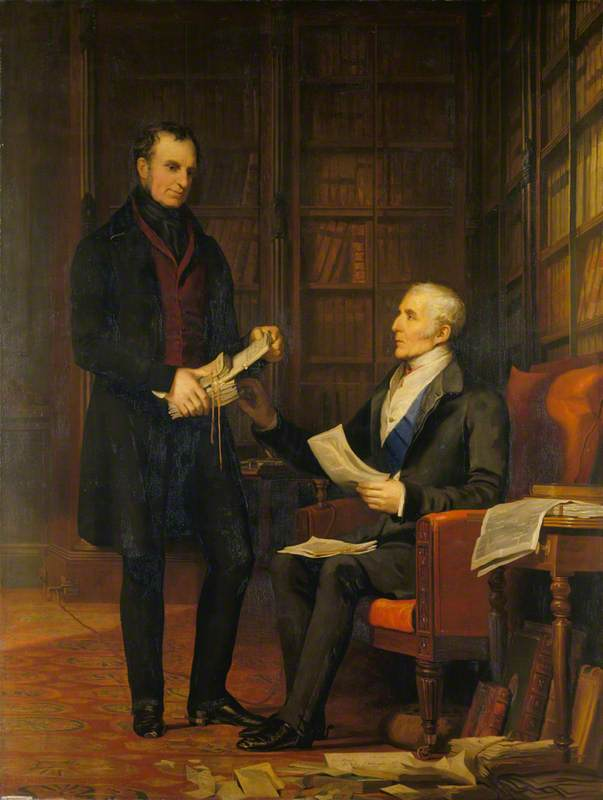
The Duke of Wellington with Colonel Gurwood at Apsley House, 1840

The United Service, 1845

Morton was a frequent exhibitor of portraits, on which he concentrated, at the British Academy and British Institution. His style resembled that of Sir Thomas Lawrence. In the National Gallery (London) there are portraits by him of Sir James Cockburn, Marianna, Lady Cockburn, and Marianna Augusta, Lady Hamilton. In Greenwich Hospital, London, there was a portrait of William IV by him.
